= Riddle Peaks =

Mountain in Washington (state), United States

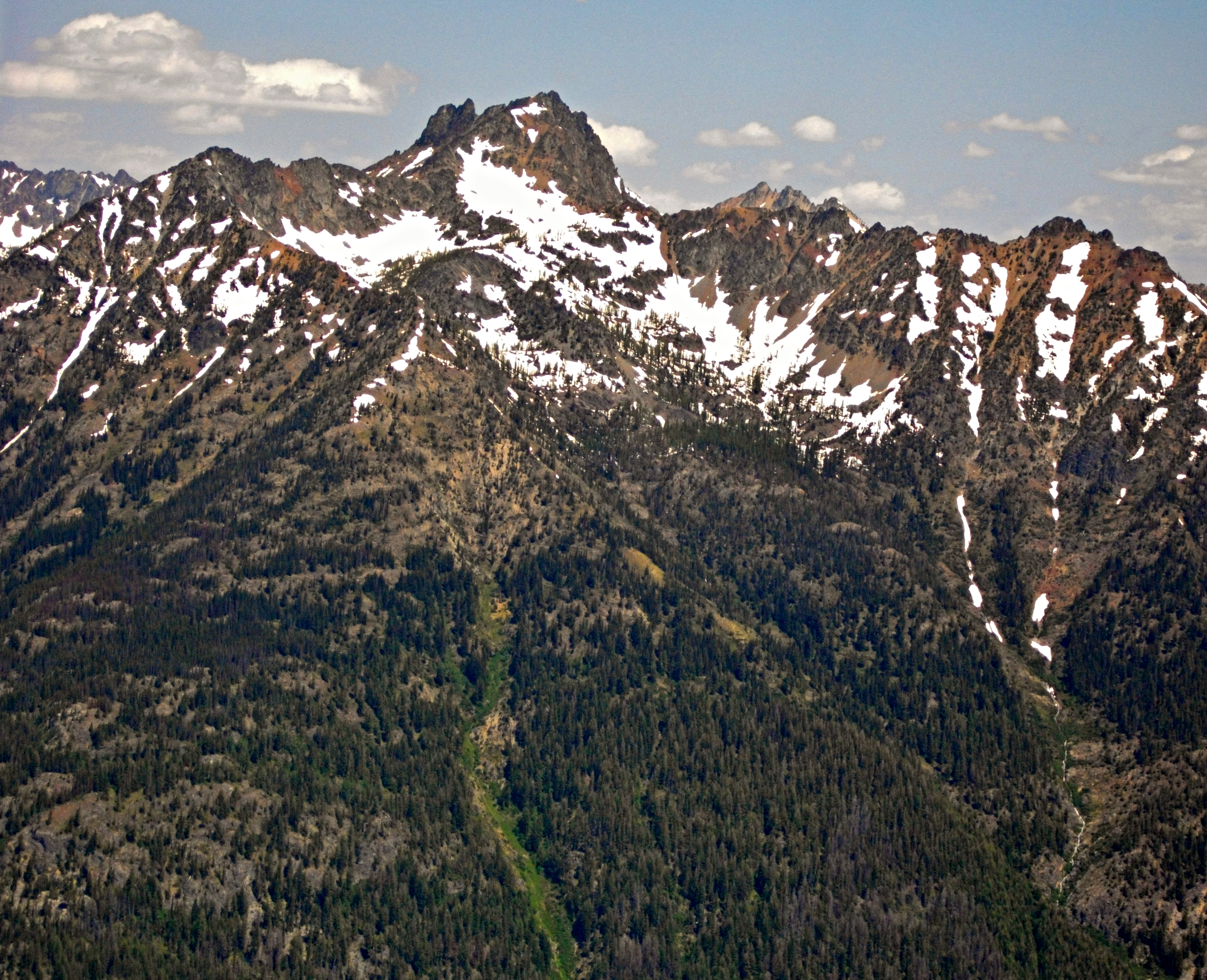
- South aspect, from Buckskin Ridge

Highest point
- Elevation: 8,212 ft (2,503 m)
- Prominence: 1,120 ft (340 m)
- Parent peak: Flora Mountain (8,320 ft)
- Isolation: 2.25 mi (3.62 km)
- Coordinates: 48°13′40″N 120°44′19″W

Geography
- Location within Washington (state) Location within the United States
- Interactive map of Riddle Peaks
- Location: Glacier Peak Wilderness; Chelan County, Washington, U.S.
- Parent range: North Cascades
- Topo map: USGS Pinnacle Mountain

Geology
- Rock type: Hornblende gabbro

Climbing
- First ascent: September 11, 1940
- Easiest route: class 2 scrambling Northeast ridge

Riddle Peaks, also known as Riddle Peak, is an 8,212-foot (2,503-metre) mountain summit located at the head of Riddle Creek in the North Cascades, in Chelan County of Washington state. Riddle Peak is situated on the Glacier Peak Wilderness boundary, six miles west of Lake Chelan, and 2.5 mi (4.0 km) northeast of Holden, on land managed by the Wenatchee National Forest. The nearest higher neighbor is Flora Mountain, 2.25 miles (3.62 km) to the northeast, and Martin Peak lies 3.7 miles (6.0 km) to the west-northwest. Precipitation runoff from the mountain drains into Lake Chelan via Railroad Creek, Riddle Creek, and Devore Creek. Topographic relief is significant since the southern aspect of the mountain rises 5,000 feet above the Railroad Creek valley in approximately 2 mi (3.2 km). The first ascent of the peak was made September 11, 1940, by Everett and Ida Zacher Darr, Joe Leuthold, and Eldon Metzger via an easy ridge from Tenmile Pass.

== Climate ==
Lying east of the Cascade crest, the area around Riddle Peaks is a bit drier than areas to the west. Summers can bring warm temperatures and occasional thunderstorms. Most weather fronts originate in the Pacific Ocean, and travel northeast toward the Cascade Mountains. As fronts approach the North Cascades, they are forced upward by the peaks of the Cascade Range, causing them to drop their moisture in the form of rain or snowfall onto the Cascades (Orographic lift). As a result, the North Cascades experiences high precipitation, especially during the winter months in the form of snowfall. With its impressive height, Riddle Peak can have snow on it in late-spring and early-fall, and can be very cold in the winter.

== Geology ==
The North Cascades features some of the most rugged topography in the Cascade Range with craggy peaks, ridges, and deep glacial valleys. Geological events occurring many years ago created the diverse topography and drastic elevation changes over the Cascade Range leading to the various climate differences. These climate differences lead to vegetation variety defining the ecoregions in this area.

The history of the formation of the Cascade Mountains dates back millions of years ago to the late Eocene Epoch. With the North American Plate overriding the Pacific Plate, episodes of volcanic igneous activity persisted. Glacier Peak, a stratovolcano that is 16.5 mi (26.6 km) west-southwest of Martin Peak, began forming in the mid-Pleistocene. In addition, small fragments of the oceanic and continental lithosphere called terranes created the North Cascades about 50 million years ago.

During the Pleistocene period dating back over two million years ago, glaciation advancing and retreating repeatedly scoured the landscape leaving deposits of rock debris. The U-shaped cross section of the river valleys is a result of recent glaciation. Uplift and faulting in combination with glaciation have been the dominant processes which have created the tall peaks and deep valleys of the North Cascades area.

== See also ==
- Geography of the North Cascades
- List of Highest Mountain Peaks in Washington
