= Dumbell Mountain =

Mountain in Washington (state), United States

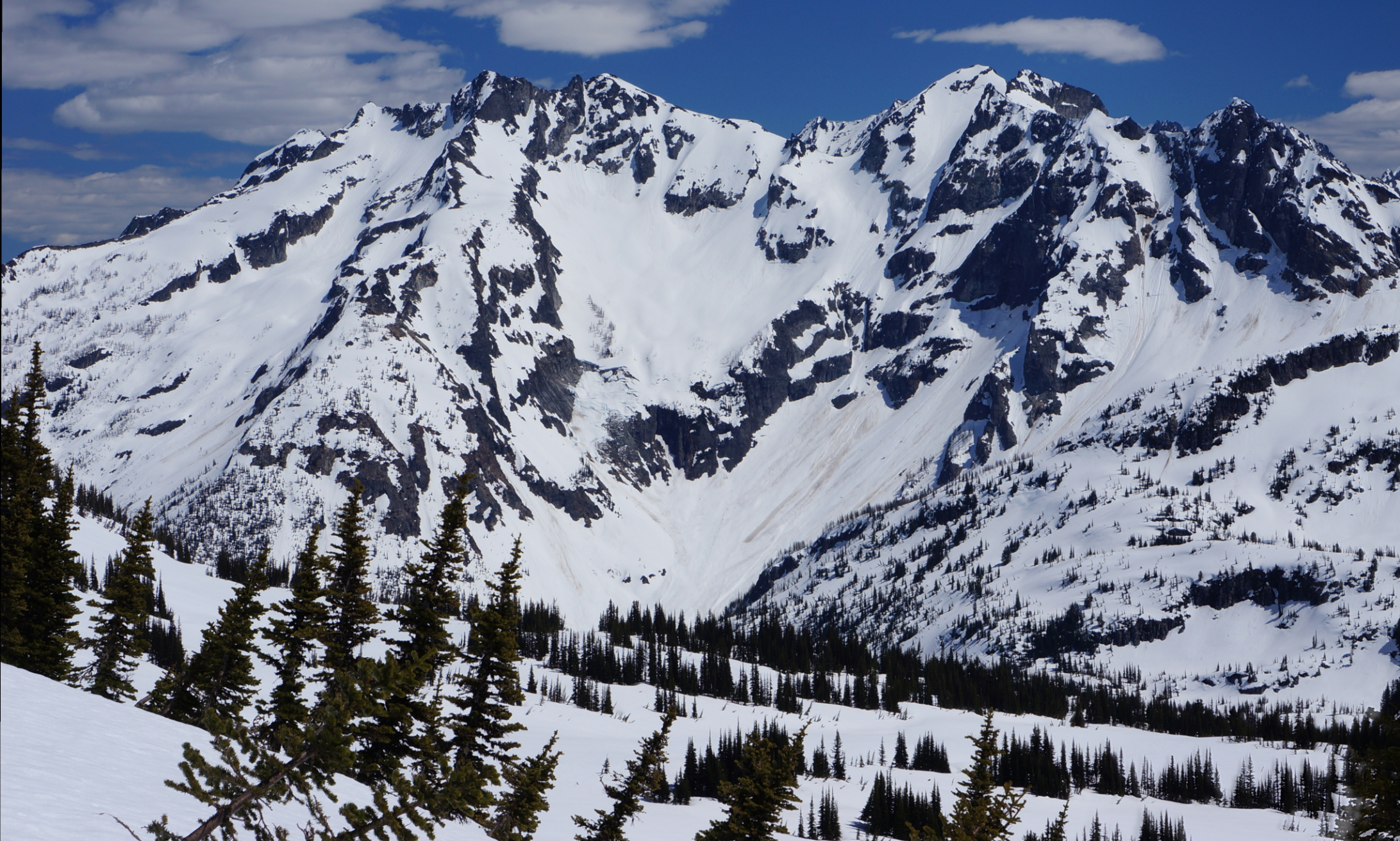
- Greenwood and Dumbell seen from Cloudy Pass

Highest point
- Elevation: 8,416 ft (2,565 m)
- Prominence: 1,316 ft (401 m)
- Parent peak: Seven Fingered Jack
- Isolation: 2.53 mi (4.07 km)
- Coordinates: 48°10′48″N 120°51′31″W

Geography
- Location within Washington (state) Location within the United States
- Interactive map of Dumbell Mountain
- Country: United States
- State: Washington
- County: Chelan
- Protected area: Glacier Peak Wilderness
- Parent range: Entiat Mountains; North Cascades; Cascade Range
- Topo map: USGS Holden

Geology
- Rock age: Cretaceous
- Rock type: Dumbell Mountain plutons gneissic hornblende quartz diorite

Climbing
- First ascent: 1932 Richard Alt, George Fahey
- Easiest route: Scrambling

Dumbell Mountain is an 8,416-foot (2,565-metre) double summit massif located in the Glacier Peak Wilderness of the North Cascades, in Chelan County of Washington state. The Dumbell summit is slightly higher than the northeast subpeak (8,408 ft) which is unofficially called Greenwood Mountain. The nearest higher neighbor is Chiwawa Mountain, 2.4 mi (3.9 km) to the east-southeast. Precipitation runoff from Dumbell Mountain drains into tributaries of the Chelan River and the Wenatchee River. The mountain's descriptive name was applied by Albert Hale Sylvester (1871–1944), pioneer surveyor, explorer, topographer, and forest supervisor in the Cascades.

== Geology ==
Dumbell Mountain is located in the Cloudy Pass batholith, an intrusive formation that was formed approximately 20 million years ago, during the early Miocene. The history of the formation of the Cascade Mountains dates back millions of years ago to the late Eocene Epoch. With the North American Plate overriding the Pacific Plate, episodes of volcanic igneous activity persisted. In addition, small fragments of the oceanic and continental lithosphere called terranes created the North Cascades about 50 million years ago.

During the Pleistocene period dating back over two million years ago, glaciation advancing and retreating repeatedly scoured and shaped the landscape. Glaciation was most prevalent approximately 18,000 years ago, and most valleys were ice-free by 12,000 years ago. Uplift and faulting in combination with glaciation have been the dominant processes which have created the tall peaks and deep valleys of the North Cascades area. Subduction and tectonic activity in the area began during the late cretaceous period, about 90 million years ago. Extensive volcanic activity began to take place in the oligocene, about 35 million years ago. Glacier Peak, a stratovolcano that is southwest of Dumbell Mountain, began forming in the mid-Pleistocene.

== Climate ==
Dumbell Mountain is located in the marine west coast climate zone of western North America. Weather fronts coming off the Pacific Ocean travel northeast toward the Cascade Mountains. As fronts approach the North Cascades, they are forced upward by the peaks of the Cascade Range, causing them to drop their moisture in the form of rain or snow onto the Cascades (Orographic lift). As a result, the west side of the North Cascades experiences high precipitation, especially during the winter months in the form of snowfall. Because of maritime influence, snow tends to be wet and heavy, resulting in high avalanche danger. During winter months, weather is usually cloudy, but, due to high pressure systems over the Pacific Ocean that intensify during summer months, there is often little or no cloud cover during the summer. Due to its temperate climate and proximity to the Pacific Ocean, areas west of the Cascade Crest very rarely experience temperatures below 0 °F (−18 °C) or above 80 °F (27 °C).

== Gallery ==
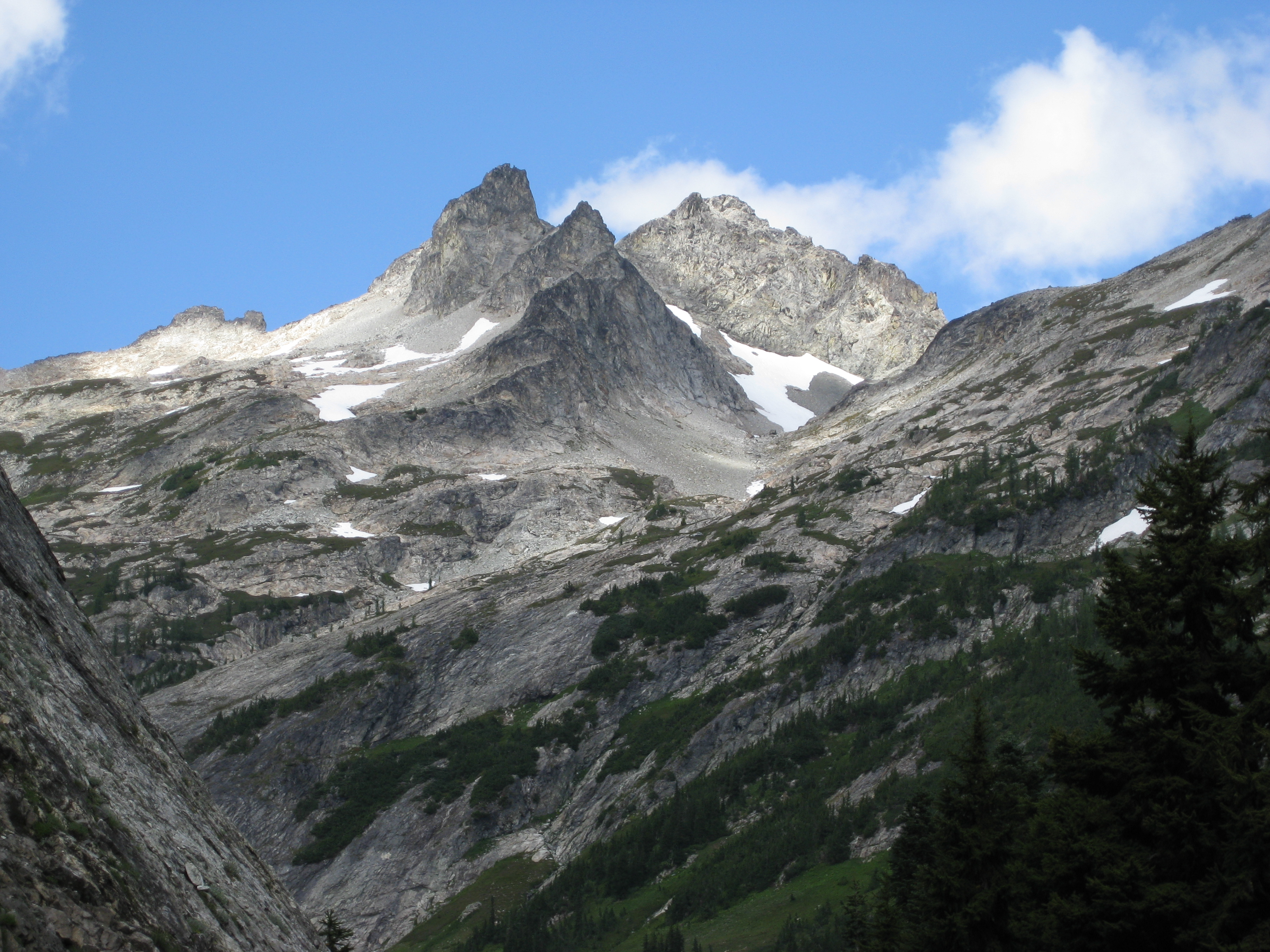
Southwest aspect from Spider Meadow area

== See also ==
- Geography of the North Cascades
- List of mountain peaks of Washington (state)
