= Mount Fernow =

Mountain in Washington (state), United States

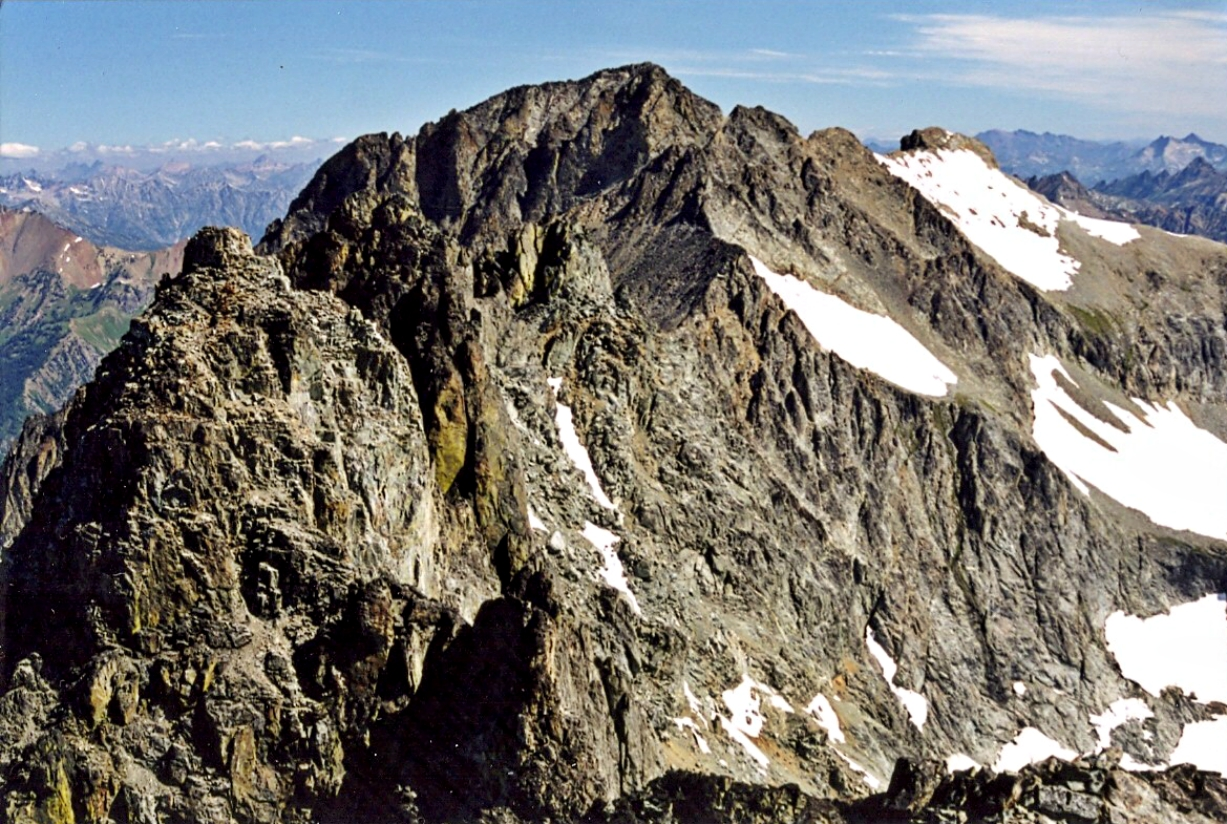
- Mount Fernow

Highest point
- Elevation: 9,249 ft (2,819 m)
- Prominence: 2,811 ft (857 m)
- Coordinates: 48°9′43″N 120°48′29″W

Naming
- Etymology: Bernhard Fernow

Geography
- Location within Washington (state)
- Interactive map of Mount Fernow
- Location: Chelan County, Washington, United States
- Parent range: North Cascades

Climbing
- First ascent: 1932

Mount Fernow is a tall peak in the North Cascades in the U.S. state of Washington and within the Glacier Peak Wilderness of the Wenatchee National Forest. At 9,249 feet (2,819 m) in elevation it is the eighth-highest peak in Washington and the state's third-highest non-volcanic peak. It is also the highest peak of the Entiat Mountains, a sub-range of the Cascades. Mount Fernow's prominence is 2,811 ft (857 m), making it the sixtieth-most-prominent peak in Washington. The closest peak to Fernow is Copper Peak, 0.88 mi (1.42 km) to the north, and the nearest higher peak is Bonanza Peak, 5.9 mi (9.5 km) to the north.

Mount Fernow is flanked by several glaciers. Other large glaciated peaks are nearby, such as Seven Fingered Jack to the south. The headwaters of the Entiat River rise from the south slopes of Mount Fernow and the east slopes of Seven Fingered Jack.

== History ==
Mount Fernow was named by Albert H. Sylvester in honor of Bernhard Fernow, a German forester who moved to the United States and worked for the Division of Forestry in the United States Department of Agriculture in the late 19th century.

Mount Fernow was first summited in 1932 by a party including Oscar Pennington and Hermann Ulrichs.

A small unnamed lake sits on the northwestern slopes of Fernow. Travelling here requires crossing loose boulder fields.

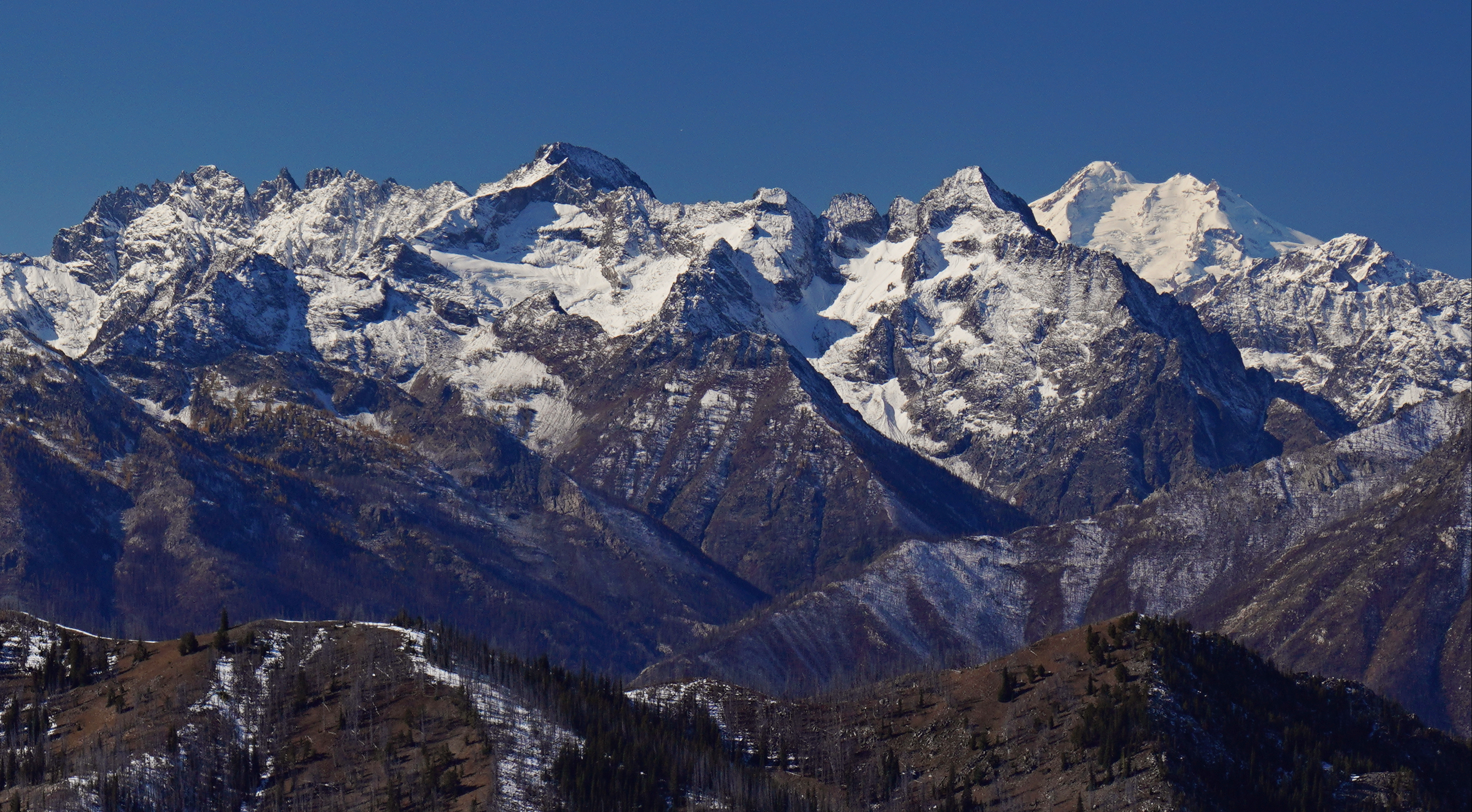
Seven Fingered Jack, Fernow, Copper Peak, and Glacier Peak from the east

== See also ==
- List of highest mountain peaks in Washington
- Mount Fernow (King County, Washington)
