= Martin Peak (Washington) =

Mountain in Washington, America

- Location within Washington (state) Location within the United States
- Interactive map of

Highest point
- Elevation: 8,509 ft (2,594 m)
- Prominence: 2,152 ft (656 m)
- Parent peak: Bonanza Peak (9,511 ft)
- Isolation: 2.33 mi (3.75 km)
- Coordinates: 48°14′30″N 120°48′57″W

Geography
- Country: United States
- State: Washington
- County: Chelan
- Protected area: Glacier Peak Wilderness
- Parent range: North Cascades
- Topo map: USGS Holden

Geology
- Rock type(s): schist, marble

Climbing
- First ascent: 1936
- Easiest route: class 4 scrambling

Martin Peak is an 8,509-foot (2,594-metre) mountain summit located in the North Cascades, in Chelan County of Washington state. Martin Peak is situated 80 miles northeast of Seattle, and 3 mi (4.8 km) northwest of Holden, in the Glacier Peak Wilderness, on land managed by the Wenatchee National Forest. Martin Peak ranks 57th on Washington's highest 100 peaks, and 54th on the "Bulger List". The nearest higher neighbor is Bonanza Peak, 2.35 miles (3.78 km) to the west, and Riddle Peak lies 3.7 miles (6.0 km) to the east-southeast. Precipitation runoff from the mountain and meltwater from the glacier in the east cirque drains into nearby Lake Chelan via Railroad Creek and Company Creek. Topographic relief is significant since the southern aspect of the mountain rises 4,900 feet above the Railroad Creek Valley in approximately two miles (3.2 km). The first ascent of the peak was made in July 1936 by Ida Zacher Darr.

== Climate ==
Lying east of the Cascade crest, the area around Martin Peak is a bit drier than areas to the west. Summers can bring warm temperatures and occasional thunderstorms. Weather fronts originating in the Pacific Ocean travel northeast toward the Cascade Mountains. As fronts approach the North Cascades, they are forced upward by the peaks of the Cascade Range, causing them to drop their moisture in the form of rain or snow onto the Cascades (Orographic lift). As a result, the North Cascades experiences high precipitation, especially during the winter months in the form of snowfall. With its impressive height, Martin Peak can have snow on it in late-spring and early-fall, and can be very cold in the winter.

== Geology ==
The North Cascades features some of the most rugged topography in the Cascade Range with craggy peaks, ridges, and deep glacial valleys. Geological events occurring many years ago created the diverse topography and drastic elevation changes over the Cascade Range leading to the various climate differences. These climate differences lead to vegetation variety defining the ecoregions in this area.

The history of the formation of the Cascade Mountains dates back millions of years ago to the late Eocene Epoch. With the North American Plate overriding the Pacific Plate, episodes of volcanic igneous activity persisted. Glacier Peak, a stratovolcano that is 16.5 mi (26.6 km) west-southwest of Martin Peak, began forming in the mid-Pleistocene. In addition, small fragments of the oceanic and continental lithosphere called terranes created the North Cascades about 50 million years ago.

During the Pleistocene period dating back over two million years ago, glaciation advancing and retreating repeatedly scoured the landscape leaving deposits of rock debris. The U-shaped cross section of the river valleys is a result of recent glaciation. Uplift and faulting in combination with glaciation have been the dominant processes which have created the tall peaks and deep valleys of the North Cascades area.

== Gallery ==
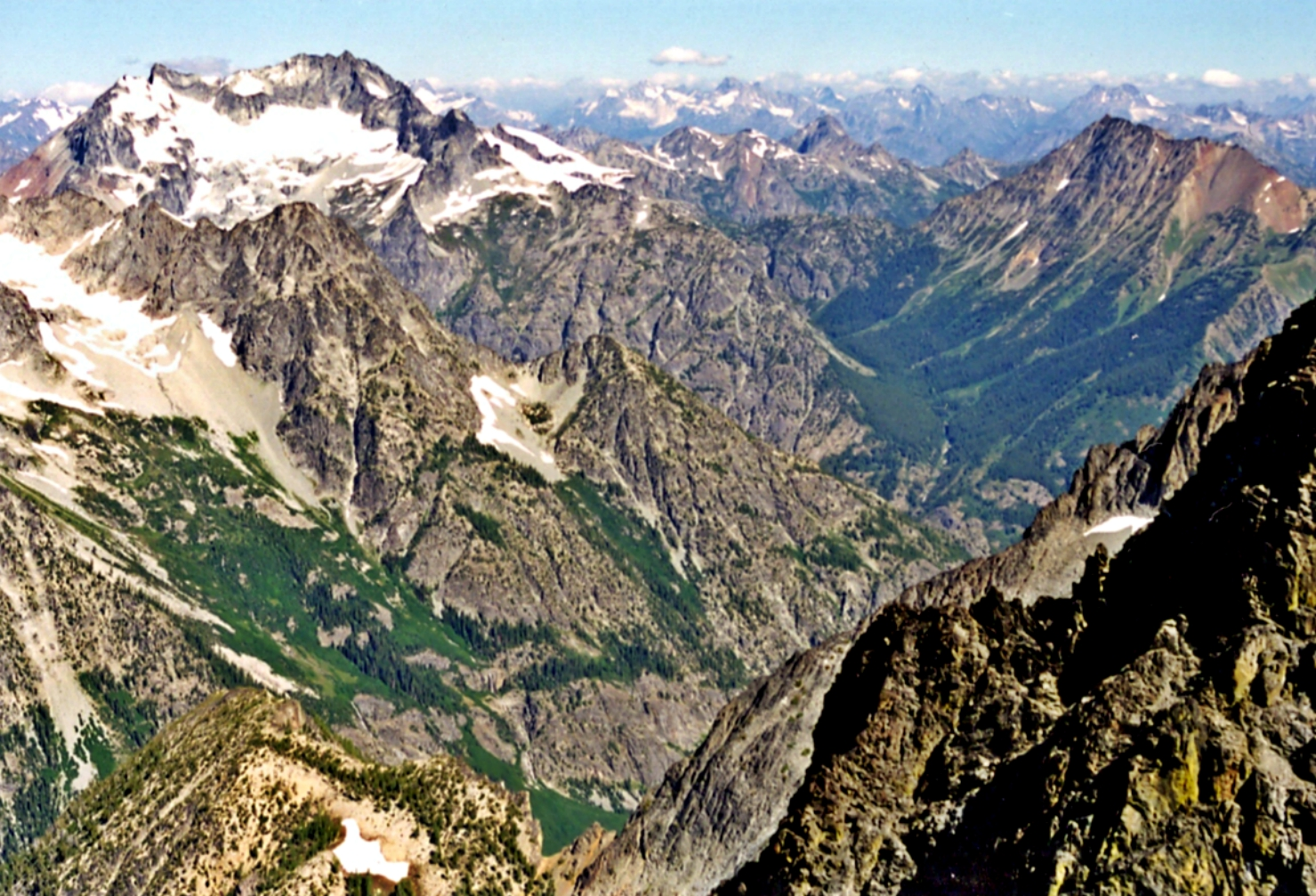
Martin Peak (upper right) and Bonanza Peak (left) seen from Seven Fingered Jack

== See also ==
- Geography of the North Cascades
- List of Highest Mountain Peaks in Washington
