= Devore Peak =

Mountain in Washington (state), United States

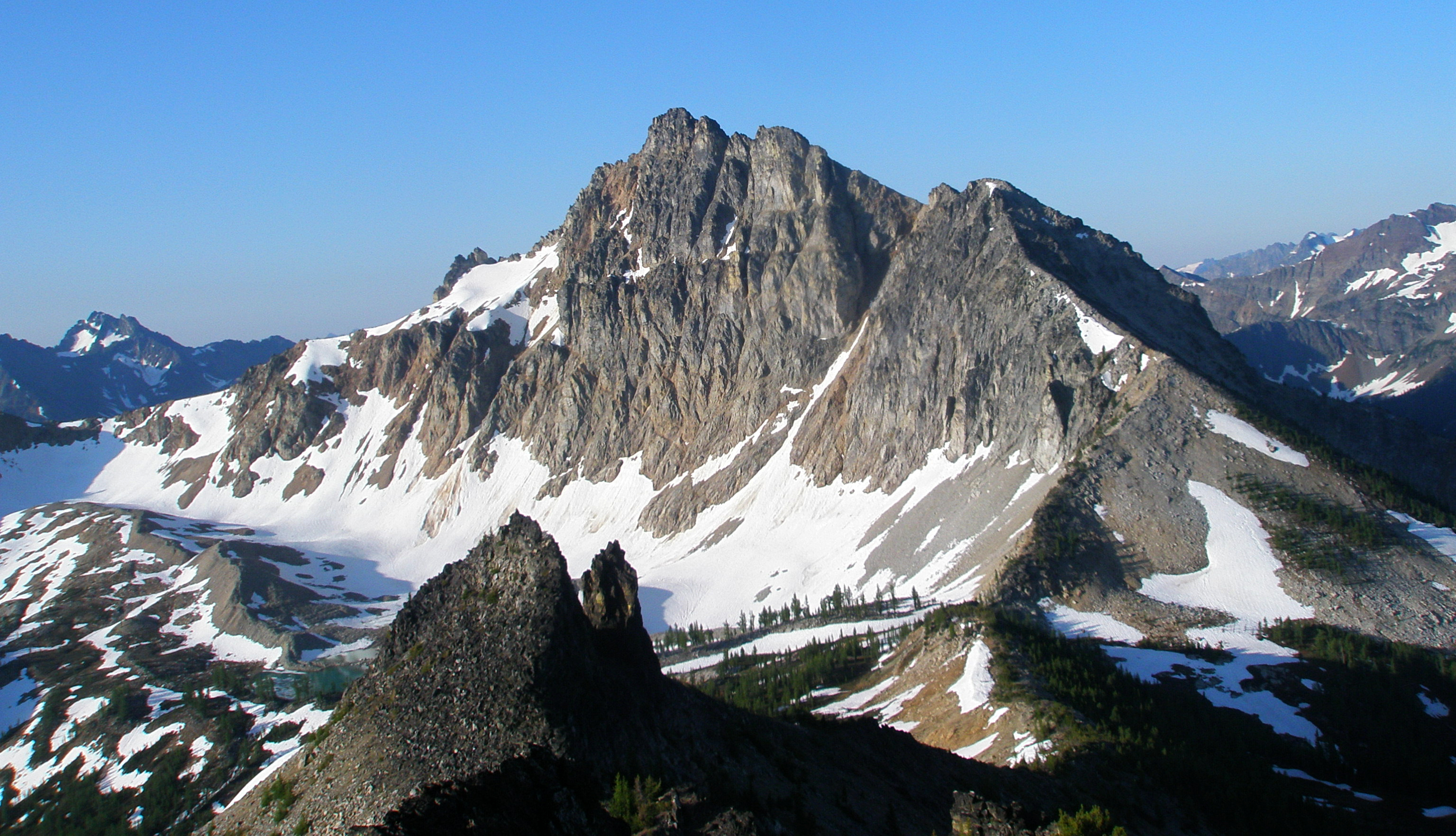
- Devore Peak seen from White Goat Mountain

Highest point
- Elevation: 8,382 ft (2,555 m)
- Prominence: 1,762 ft (537 m)
- Parent peak: Martin Peak (8,511 ft)
- Isolation: 3.37 mi (5.42 km)
- Coordinates: 48°16′36″N 120°45′55″W

Geography
- Location within Washington (state) Location within the United States
- Interactive map of Devore Peak
- Country: United States
- State: Washington
- County: Chelan
- Protected area: Glacier Peak Wilderness
- Parent range: North Cascades; Cascade Range
- Topo map: USGS Mount Lyall

Geology
- Rock type: Granodiorite

Climbing
- First ascent: July 28, 1940 by Everett Darr, Ida Darr, Abigail Avery, Stuart B. Avery, Jane Foster McConnell, Grant McConnell, Paul Parker
- Easiest route: Climbing class 4

Devore Peak is an 8,382-foot (2,555-metre) mountain summit located in the Glacier Peak Wilderness of the North Cascades in Washington state. The mountain is situated in Chelan County, on land managed by Wenatchee National Forest. Its nearest higher peak is Martin Peak, 3.36 mi (5.41 km) to the southwest, and Tupshin Peak lies 1.55 mi (2.49 km) to the north-northeast. Precipitation runoff from the peak drains to nearby Lake Chelan via tributaries of the Stehekin River and Devore Creek.

== Climate ==
Weather fronts originating in the Pacific Ocean travel northeast toward the Cascade Mountains. As fronts approach the North Cascades, they are forced upward by the peaks of the Cascade Range, causing them to drop their moisture in the form of rain or snowfall onto the Cascades (Orographic lift). As a result, the North Cascades experiences high precipitation, especially during the winter months in the form of snowfall. During winter months, weather is usually cloudy, but, due to high pressure systems over the Pacific Ocean that intensify during summer months, there is often little or no cloud cover during the summer.

== Geology ==
The North Cascades feature some of the most rugged topography in the Cascade Range with craggy peaks, spires, ridges, and deep glacial valleys. Geological events occurring many years ago created the diverse topography and drastic elevation changes over the Cascade Range leading to the various climate differences.

The history of the formation of the Cascade Mountains dates back millions of years ago to the late Eocene Epoch. With the North American Plate overriding the Pacific Plate, episodes of volcanic igneous activity persisted. Glacier Peak, a stratovolcano that is 19.74 mi (31.77 km) southwest of Devore Peak, began forming in the mid-Pleistocene. In addition, small fragments of the oceanic and continental lithosphere called terranes created the North Cascades about 50 million years ago.

During the Pleistocene period dating back over two million years ago, glaciation advancing and retreating repeatedly scoured the landscape leaving deposits of rock debris. The U-shaped cross section of the river valleys is a result of recent glaciation. Uplift and faulting in combination with glaciation have been the dominant processes which have created the tall peaks and deep valleys of the North Cascades area.

== Gallery ==
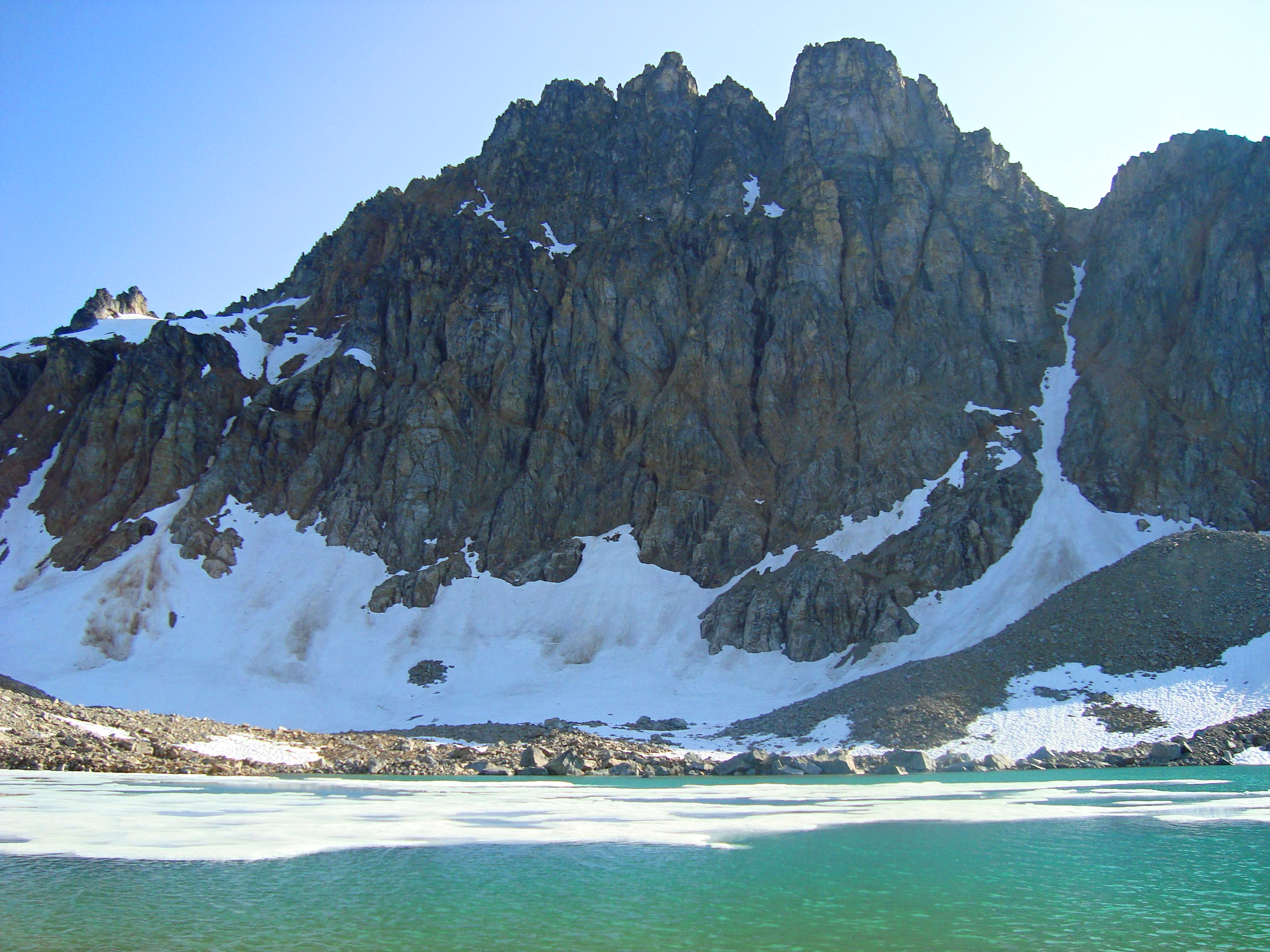
Devore's north face seen from Bird Lakes

== See also ==
- List of mountain peaks of Washington (state)
- Geology of the Pacific Northwest
