= Copper Peak (Washington) =

Mountain in Washington (state), United States

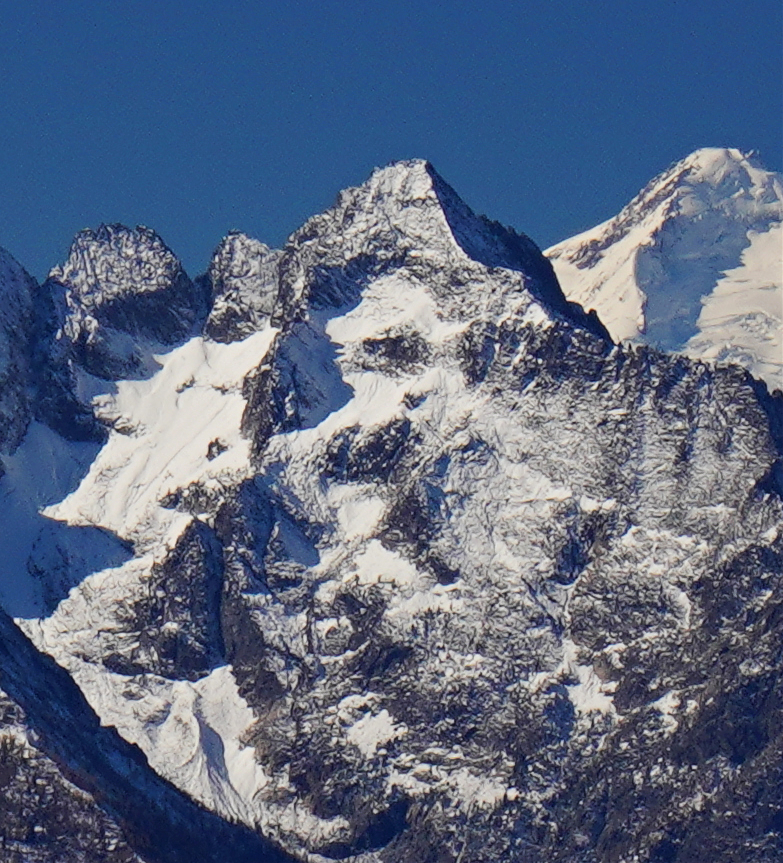
- Copper Peak, east aspect (Glacier Peak upper right)

Highest point
- Elevation: 8,965 ft (2,733 m)
- Prominence: 502 ft (153 m)
- Parent peak: Mount Fernow
- Isolation: 0.88 mi (1.42 km)
- Coordinates: 48°10′30″N 120°48′13″W

Geography
- Location within Washington (state) Location within the United States
- Interactive map of Copper Peak
- Country: United States
- State: Washington
- County: Chelan
- Protected area: Glacier Peak Wilderness
- Parent range: Entiat Mountains; North Cascades
- Topo map: USGS Holden

Geology
- Rock type: Gneissic

Climbing
- First ascent: 1937
- Easiest route: class 4-5

Copper Peak is an 8,965-foot (2,733-metre) mountain summit located in the Entiat Mountains, a sub-range of the North Cascades, in Chelan County of Washington state. Copper Peak is situated 80 miles northeast of Seattle in the Glacier Peak Wilderness, on land managed by the Wenatchee National Forest. Copper Peak ranks 21st-highest on Washington's highest 100 peaks, and 19th on the "Bulger List." The nearest higher neighbor is Mount Fernow, 0.88 miles (1.42 km) to the south. Precipitation runoff from the mountain and meltwater from the glacier on the southeast slope drains into nearby Lake Chelan via Railroad Creek. The first ascent of the peak was made in August 1937 by Franklin Bennet, Edgar Courtwright, and Toivo Hagman. The peak's toponym refers to an abandoned copper mine that once operated at the northeast base of the peak.

== Climate ==
Lying east of the Cascade crest, the area around Copper Peak is a bit drier than areas to the west. Summers can bring warm temperatures and occasional thunderstorms. Weather fronts originating in the Pacific Ocean travel northeast toward the Cascade Mountains. As fronts approach the North Cascades, they are forced upward by the peaks of the Cascade Range (orographic lift), causing them to drop their moisture in the form of rain or snowfall onto the Cascades. As a result, the North Cascades experiences high precipitation, especially during the winter months in the form of snowfall. With its impressive height, Copper Peak can have snow on it in late-spring and early-fall, and it can be very cold in the winter.

== Geology ==
The North Cascades features some of the most rugged topography in the Cascade Range with craggy peaks, ridges, and deep glacial valleys. Geological events occurring many years ago created the diverse topography and drastic elevation changes over the Cascade Range leading to the various climate differences. These climate differences lead to vegetation variety defining the ecoregions in this area.

The history of the formation of the Cascade Mountains dates back millions of years ago to the late Eocene Epoch. With the North American Plate overriding the Pacific Plate, episodes of volcanic igneous activity persisted. In addition, small fragments of the oceanic and continental lithosphere called terranes created the North Cascades about 50 million years ago.

During the Pleistocene period dating back over two million years ago, glaciation advancing and retreating repeatedly scoured the landscape leaving deposits of rock debris. The U-shaped cross section of the river valleys is a result of recent glaciation. Uplift and faulting in combination with glaciation have been the dominant processes which have created the tall peaks and deep valleys of the North Cascades area.

== Gallery ==
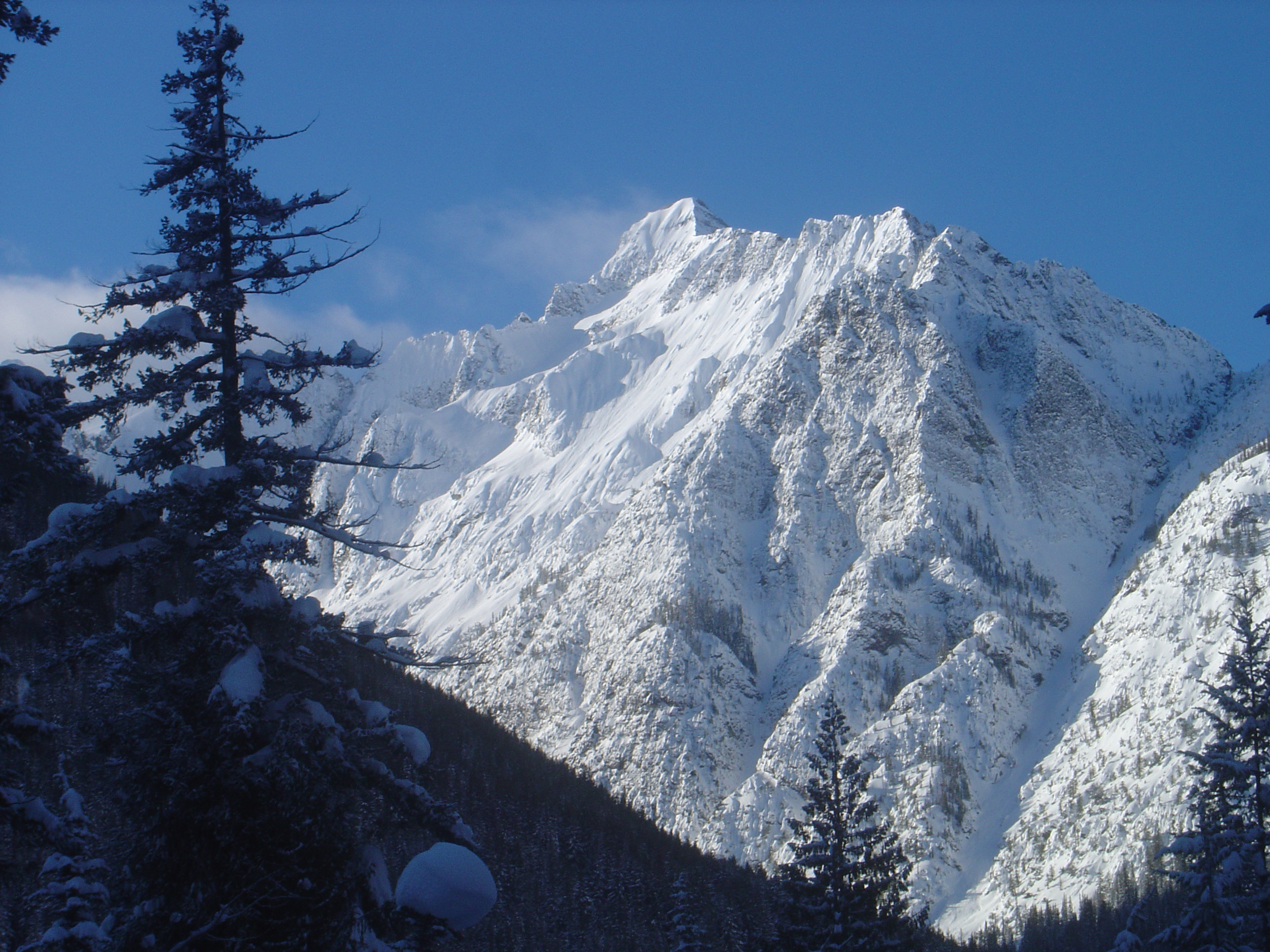
Copper Peak in winter

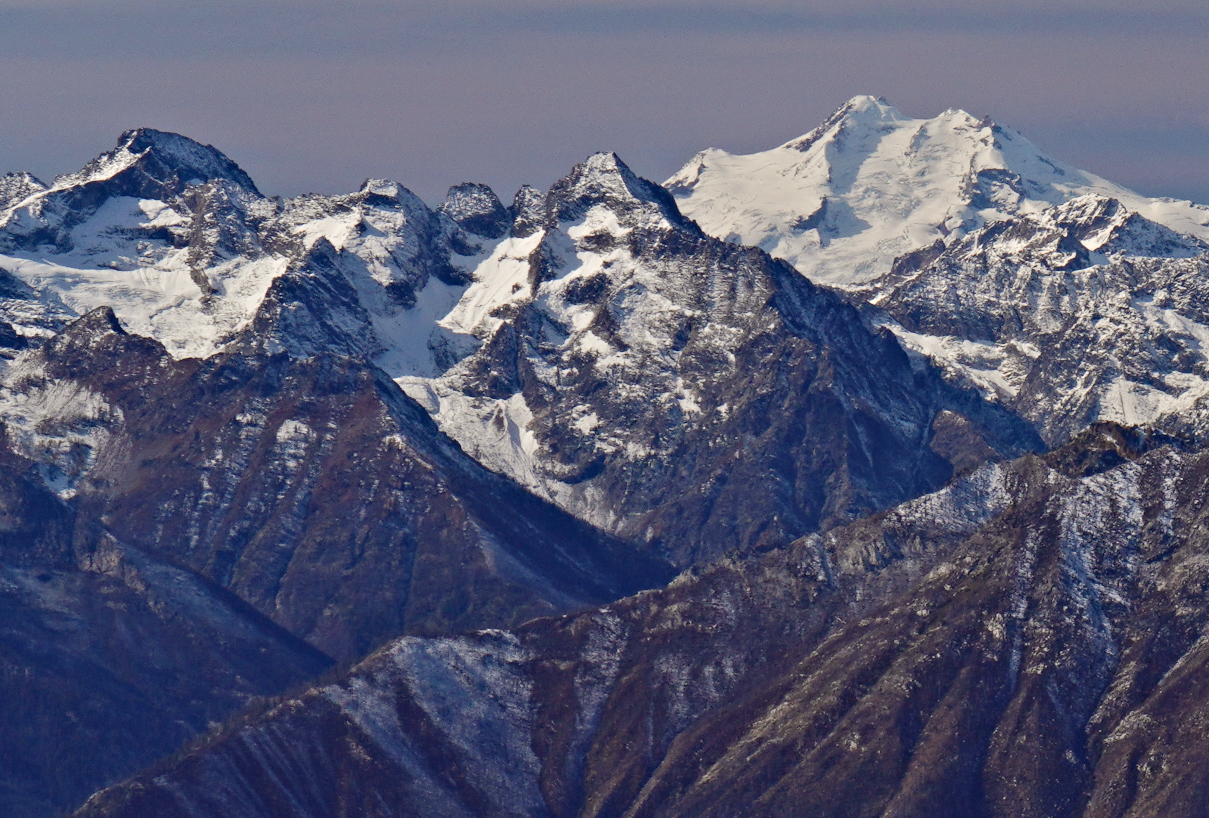
Copper Peak centered, with Mt. Fernow (left) and Glacier Peak (right)

== See also ==
- Geography of Washington (state)
- Geology of the Pacific Northwest
