= Seven Fingered Jack =

Mountain in Washington (state), United States

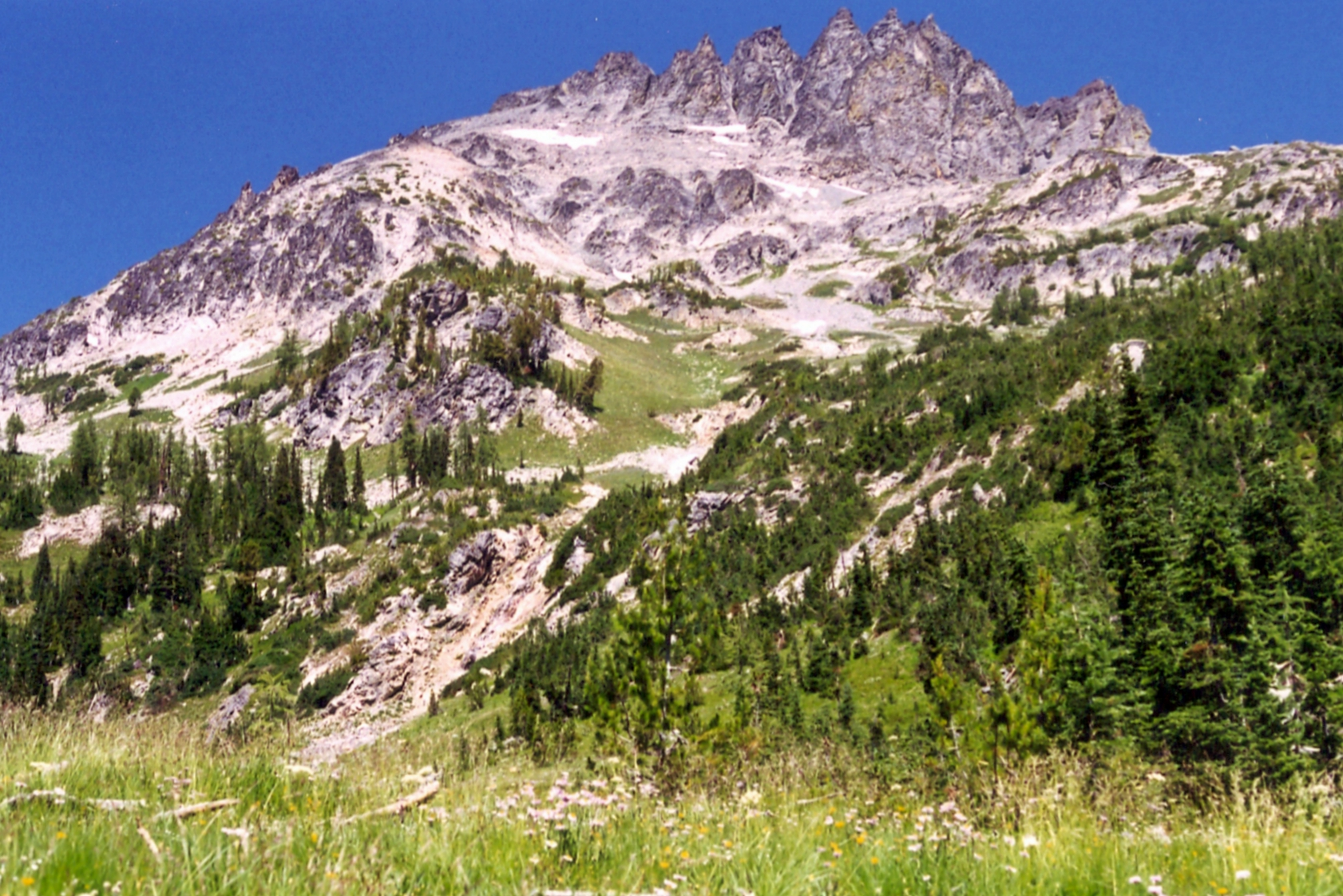
- Seven Fingered Jack from Leroy Creek Basin

Highest point
- Elevation: 9,100 ft (2,774 m)
- Prominence: 380 ft (116 m)
- Parent peak: Mount Fernow
- Coordinates: 48°9′2″N 120°48′50″W

Geography
- Location within Washington (state)
- Location: Chelan, Washington, United States
- Parent range: North Cascades

Climbing
- First ascent: 1932 by Richard Alt.

Seven Fingered Jack is a mountain in the North Cascades in the U.S. state of Washington. It is located at the north end of the Entiat Mountains, a sub-range of the Cascade Range. It is part of a three-peak group called the Entiat Cirque which includes Mount Maude and Mount Fernow. Seven Fingered Jack is about 4 miles (6.4 km) south of Holden. The peak is in the Glacier Peak Wilderness of Wenatchee National Forest.

== Description ==
Sources differ over the height of Seven Fingered Jack. Peakbagger.com says it is 9,100 feet (2,800 m), peakware.com says 9,077 feet (2,767 m), and the United States Geological Survey cites 9,022 feet (2,750 m) in its Geographic Names Information System database. Its rank also differs by source. Seven Fingered Jack is the twelfth-highest peak in Washington, according to peakbagger.com and fourteenth-highest, according to peakware.com.

Seven Fingered Jack is the second-highest and middle of the three peaks of the Entiat Cirque, the other two being Mount Maude and Mount Fernow. All three are over 9,000 feet (2,700 m). Together they form a high, curved ridge from which the headwaters of the Entiat River flow eastward. There are a number of glaciers on Seven Fingered Jack and its neighbors, including Entiat Glacier. Streams flowing down the east and south sides of the mountain enter Spider Meadows, through which flows Phelps Creek, a tributary of the Chiwawa River, which flows south to the Wenatchee River. Thus Seven Fingered Jack sits on the boundary between the drainage basins of the Entiat and Wenatchee rivers. Both rivers are tributaries of the Columbia River.

== History ==
Seven Fingered Jack was once called the Entiat Needles, after their distinctive craggy granite summits. It was given its present name by Albert H. Sylvester, who served as a USGS topographer and then, from 1908 to 1931, with the Forest Service as the Forest Supervisor of the Wenatchee National Forest. Over the course of his career he gave over 3,000 names in the region.

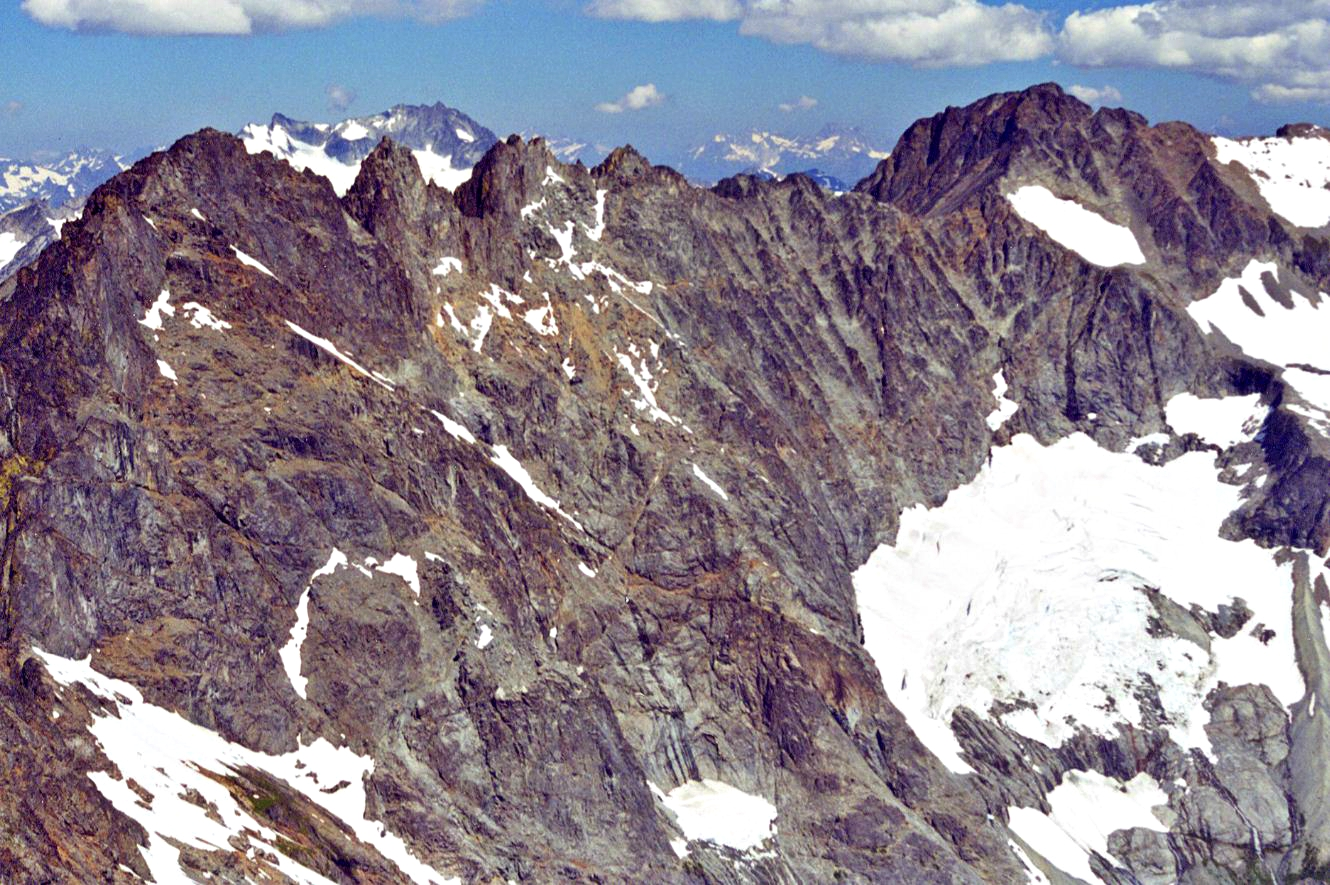
Seven Fingered Jack and Fernow seen from Maude

== See also ==
- List of mountains of the United States
- List of mountains by elevation
