= White Goat Mountain =

Mountain in Washington (state), United States

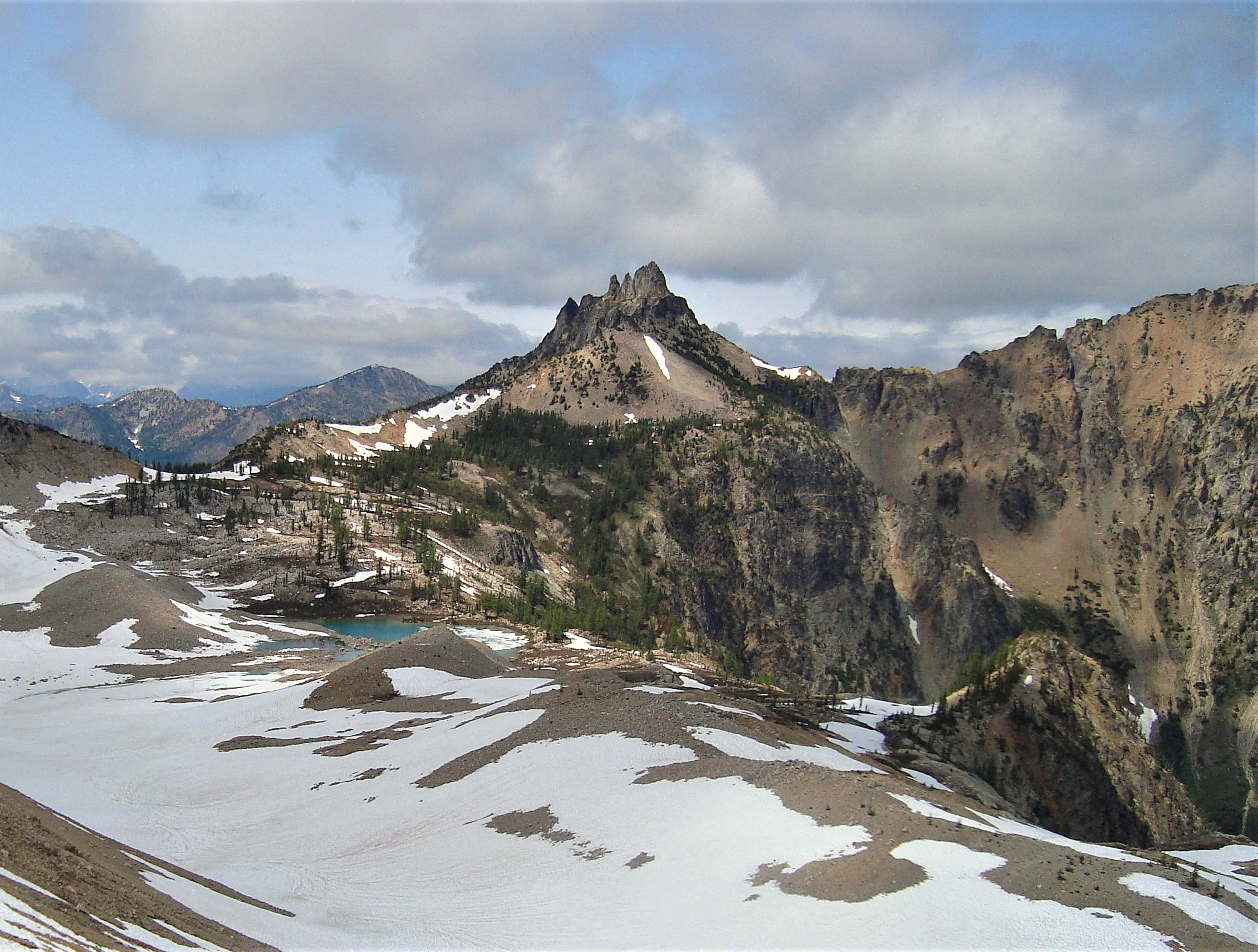
- White Goat Mountain from the south

Highest point
- Elevation: 7,800 ft (2,400 m)
- Prominence: 400 ft (120 m)
- Parent peak: Tupshin Peak (8320+ ft)
- Isolation: 0.70 mi (1.13 km)
- Coordinates: 48°17′30″N 120°45′49″W

Geography
- Location within Washington (state) Location within the United States
- Interactive map of White Goat Mountain
- Location: Chelan County; Washington, U.S.
- Parent range: North Cascades; Cascade Range
- Topo map: USGS Mount Lyall

Geology
- Rock type: gneiss

Climbing
- First ascent: September 10, 1940
- Easiest route: class 5 climbing

White Goat Mountain is a 7,800+ ft (2,380+ m) mountain summit located in the Glacier Peak Wilderness of the North Cascades in Washington state. The mountain is situated in Chelan County, on land managed by Wenatchee National Forest. Its nearest higher neighbor is Tupshin Peak, 0.7 mi (1.1 km) to the northeast, and Devore Peak is 1.02 mi (1.64 km) to the south. Precipitation runoff from the peak drains to nearby Lake Chelan via Company and Devore Creeks. The first ascent was made September 10, 1940, by Everett and Ida Zacher Darr, Joe Leuthold, and Eldon Metzger. A herd of mountain goats beneath the peak was their inspiration for so naming this geographical feature.

== Climate ==
Most weather fronts originate in the Pacific Ocean, and travel northeast toward the Cascade Mountains. As fronts approach the North Cascades, they are forced upward by the peaks of the Cascade Range, causing them to drop their moisture in the form of rain or snowfall onto the Cascades (Orographic lift). As a result, the North Cascades experiences high precipitation, especially during the winter months in the form of snowfall. During winter months, weather is usually cloudy, but, due to high pressure systems over the Pacific Ocean that intensify during summer months, there is often little or no cloud cover during the summer.

== Geology ==
The North Cascades feature some of the most rugged topography in the Cascade Range with craggy peaks, spires, ridges, and deep glacial valleys. Geological events occurring many years ago created the diverse topography and drastic elevation changes over the Cascade Range leading to the various climate differences.

The history of the formation of the Cascade Mountains dates back millions of years ago to the late Eocene Epoch. With the North American Plate overriding the Pacific Plate, episodes of volcanic igneous activity persisted. Glacier Peak, a stratovolcano that is 20 mi (32 km) southwest of White Goat Mountain, began forming in the mid-Pleistocene. In addition, small fragments of the oceanic and continental lithosphere called terranes created the North Cascades about 50 million years ago.

During the Pleistocene period dating back over two million years ago, glaciation advancing and retreating repeatedly scoured the landscape leaving deposits of rock debris. The U-shaped cross section of the river valleys is a result of recent glaciation. Uplift and faulting in combination with glaciation have been the dominant processes which have created the tall peaks and deep valleys of the North Cascades area.

== Climbing ==
Established rock climbing routes on White Goat Mountain:

- Southeast Buttress – class 5 – First ascent 1940
- Northwest Ridge – class 5 – FA 1984

== See also ==
- Geography of the North Cascades
- List of mountain peaks of Washington (state)
