= Mary Green Glacier =

Glacier in the state of Washington

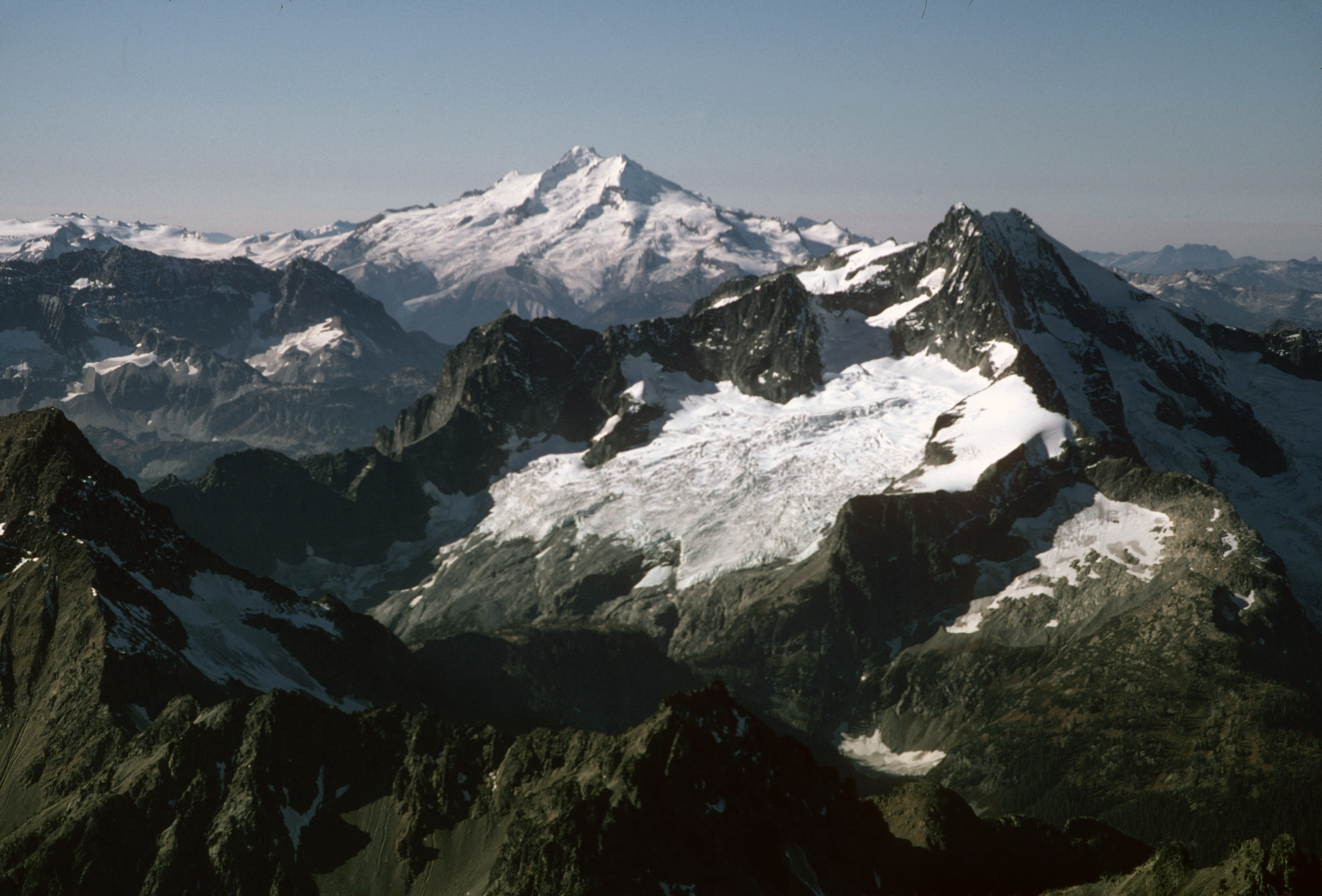
- Mary Green Glacier, front and center on Bonanza Peak which is right of center. Glacier Peak in the background.

- Location within Washington (state) Location within the United States
- Type: Alpine glacier
- Location: Chelan County, Washington, U.S.
- Coordinates: 48°14′20″N 120°51′15″W
- Length: .50 mi (0.80 km)
- Terminus: Barren rock
- Status: Retreating

Mary Green Glacier is in Wenatchee National Forest in the U.S. state of Washington, on the east slopes of Bonanza Peak, the tallest non-volcanic peak in the Cascade Range. Mary Green Glacier descends from 8,500 to 7,200 ft (2,600 to 2,200 m). Mary Green Glacier was named after the wife of a prospector and lies along the most popular route to the summit of Bonanza Peak.

== See also ==
- List of glaciers in the United States
