= Isella Glacier =

Glacier in the state of Washington

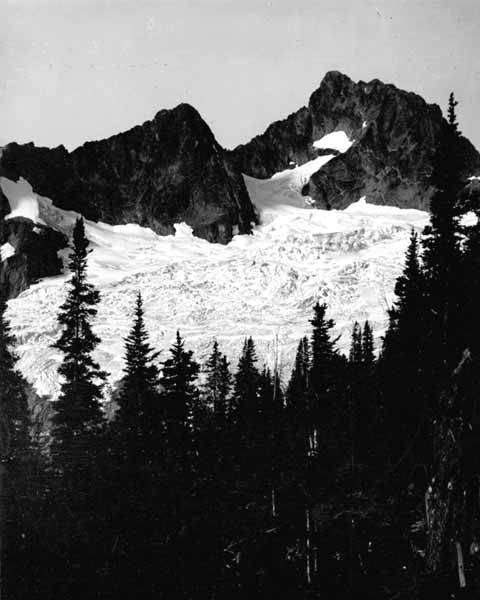
- Isella Glacier on east side of Bonanza Peak from Mary Green Mine cabins, August 23, 1907

- Location within Washington (state)
- Type: Alpine glacier
- Location: Chelan County, Washington, U.S.
- Coordinates: 48°13′59″N 120°52′11″W
- Length: .30 mi (0.48 km)
- Terminus: Barren rock
- Status: Retreating

Isella Glacier is in Wenatchee National Forest in the U.S. state of Washington, on the south slopes of Bonanza Peak, the tallest non-volcanic peak in the Cascade Range. Isella Glacier descends from 8,800 to 7,600 ft (2,700 to 2,300 m).

== See also ==
- List of glaciers in the United States
