= Company Glacier =

Glacier in the state of Washington

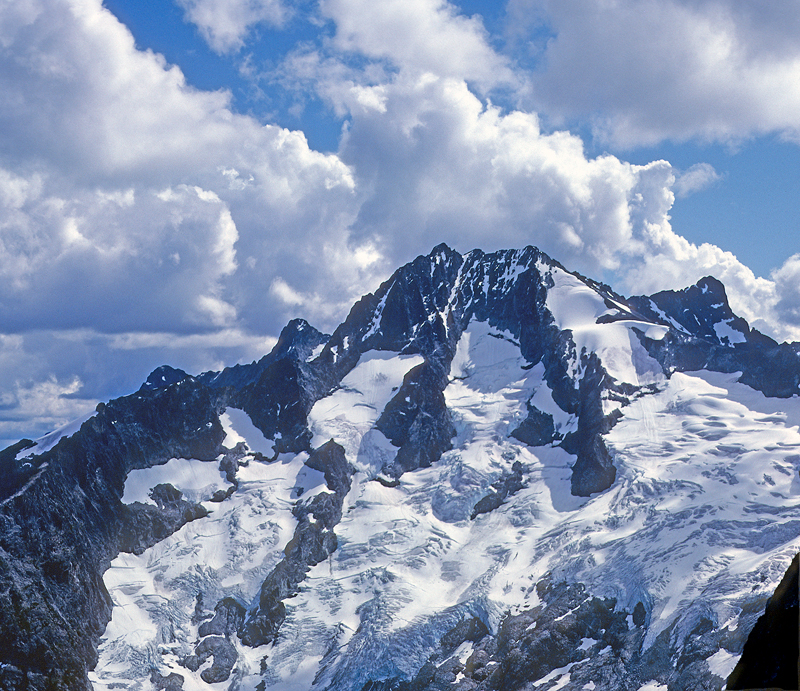
- Company Glacier on the north slopes of Bonanza Peak

- Location within Washington (state)
- Type: Alpine glacier
- Location: Chelan County, Washington, U.S.
- Coordinates: 48°14′46″N 120°51′51″W
- Length: .60 mi (0.97 km)
- Terminus: Barren rock
- Status: Retreating

Company Glacier is in Wenatchee National Forest in the U.S. state of Washington, on the north slopes of Bonanza Peak, the tallest non-volcanic peak in the Cascade Range. Company Glacier descends from 9,200 to 6,500 ft (2,800 to 2,000 m) with several main chutes converging into the main glacier below the 7,800-foot (2,400 m) level. Company Glacier was used as the approach route when Bonanza Peak was first climbed in 1937.

== See also ==
- List of glaciers in the United States
