= Bonanza Peak (Washington) =

Mountain in Washington (state), United States

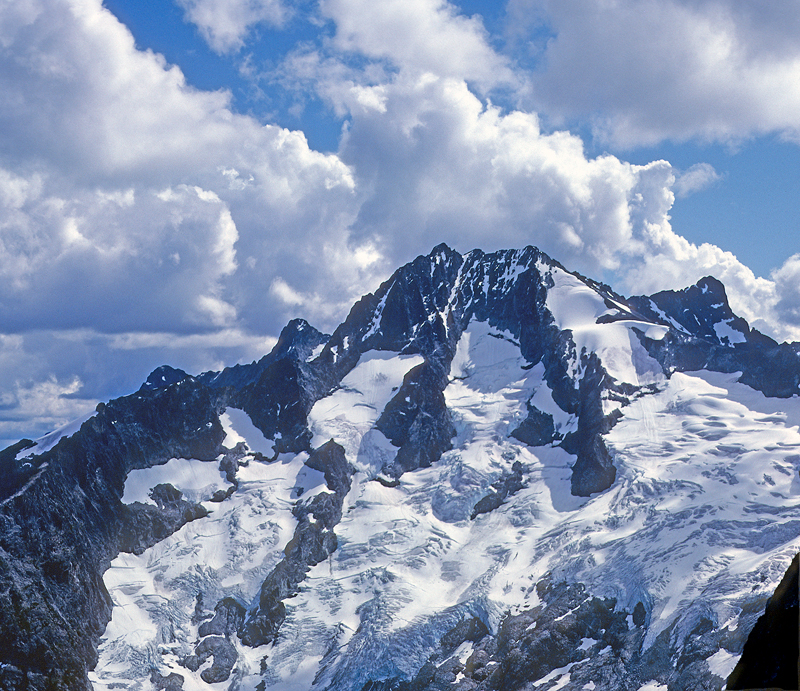
- North aspect featuring Company Glacier

Highest point
- Elevation: 9,516 ft (2,900 m)
- Prominence: 3,711 ft (1,131 m)
- Isolation: 13.8 mi (22.2 km)
- Coordinates: 48°14′18″N 120°51′59″W

Geography
- Location within Washington (state) Location within the United States
- Interactive map of Bonanza Peak
- Country: United States of America
- State: Washington
- County: Chelan
- Protected area: Glacier Peak Wilderness
- Parent range: North Cascades
- Topo map: USGS Holden

Climbing
- First ascent: 1937 by Curtis James and party
- Easiest route: Class 4

Bonanza Peak is a tall peak in the North Cascades in the U.S. state of Washington and the Glacier Peak Wilderness of the Wenatchee National Forest. At 9,516 feet (2,900 m) in elevation, it is the highest point in Chelan County, and the highest non-volcanic peak in Washington and the Cascade Range as a whole. Bonanza Peak's prominence is 3,711 feet (1,131 m), making it the 26th most prominent peak in Washington. The nearest higher peak is Glacier Peak, 14.4 miles (23.2 km) to the southwest.

Bonanza Peak is flanked with three large glaciers: Company Glacier to the north, Mary Green Glacier to the east, and Isella Glacier to the south.

== History ==
Bonanza Peak was originally named North Star Mountain, with a minor mountain to the southwest given the name Bonanza Peak. The USGS’ first topographic map of the region in 1904, however, mistakenly interchanged the names and the USGS naming was retained.

Bonanza Peak was first summited in 1937 by Curtis I. James, Barrie James, and Joe Leuthold, all members of the Mazamas.

== Climate ==
Lying east of the Cascade crest, the area around Bonanza Peak is a bit drier than areas to the west. Summers can bring warm temperatures and occasional thunderstorms. Weather fronts originating in the Pacific Ocean travel northeast toward the Cascade Mountains. As fronts approach the North Cascades, they are forced upward by the peaks (orographic lift), causing them to drop their moisture in the form of rain or snowfall onto the Cascades. As a result, the North Cascades experiences high precipitation, especially during the winter months in the form of snowfall. Precipitation runoff from the mountain and meltwater from its glaciers drains to nearby Lake Chelan via Agnes, Company, and Railroad Creeks.

Climate data for Bonanza Peak 48.2355 N, 120.8742 W, Elevation: 8,593 ft (2,619 m) (1991–2020 normals)
Month	Jan	Feb	Mar	Apr	May	Jun	Jul	Aug	Sep	Oct	Nov	Dec	Year
Mean daily maximum °F (°C)	24.2 (−4.3)	23.8 (−4.6)	25.3 (−3.7)	31.0 (−0.6)	39.2 (4.0)	45.0 (7.2)	55.0 (12.8)	55.6 (13.1)	50.0 (10.0)	39.2 (4.0)	27.2 (−2.7)	22.6 (−5.2)	36.5 (2.5)
Daily mean °F (°C)	19.2 (−7.1)	17.6 (−8.0)	18.0 (−7.8)	22.3 (−5.4)	30.3 (−0.9)	35.9 (2.2)	44.7 (7.1)	45.1 (7.3)	39.6 (4.2)	30.5 (−0.8)	21.9 (−5.6)	18.0 (−7.8)	28.6 (−1.9)
Mean daily minimum °F (°C)	14.3 (−9.8)	11.4 (−11.4)	10.7 (−11.8)	13.7 (−10.2)	21.4 (−5.9)	26.8 (−2.9)	34.4 (1.3)	34.6 (1.4)	29.3 (−1.5)	21.9 (−5.6)	16.5 (−8.6)	13.3 (−10.4)	20.7 (−6.3)
Average precipitation inches (mm)	15.01 (381)	13.30 (338)	13.23 (336)	8.11 (206)	4.56 (116)	3.56 (90)	1.52 (39)	2.03 (52)	4.22 (107)	9.83 (250)	14.48 (368)	15.32 (389)	105.17 (2,672)
Source: PRISM Climate Group

== Geology ==
The North Cascades features some of the most rugged topography in the Cascade Range with craggy peaks, ridges, and deep glacial valleys. Geological events occurring many years ago created the diverse topography and drastic elevation changes over the Cascade Range leading to the various climate differences. These climate differences lead to vegetation variety defining the ecoregions in this area.

The history of the formation of the Cascade Mountains dates back millions of years ago to the late Eocene Epoch. With the North American Plate overriding the Pacific Plate, episodes of volcanic igneous activity persisted. Glacier Peak, a stratovolcano that is 14.4 mi (23.2 km) southwest of Bonanza Peak, began forming in the mid-Pleistocene. In addition, small fragments of the oceanic and continental lithosphere called terranes created the North Cascades about 50 million years ago.

During the Pleistocene period dating back over two million years ago, glaciation advancing and retreating repeatedly scoured the landscape leaving deposits of rock debris. The U-shaped cross section of the river valleys is a result of recent glaciation. Uplift and faulting in combination with glaciation have been the dominant processes which have created the tall peaks and deep valleys of the North Cascades area.

== See also ==
- Geography of the North Cascades
- List of mountain peaks of Washington (state)

== Gallery ==
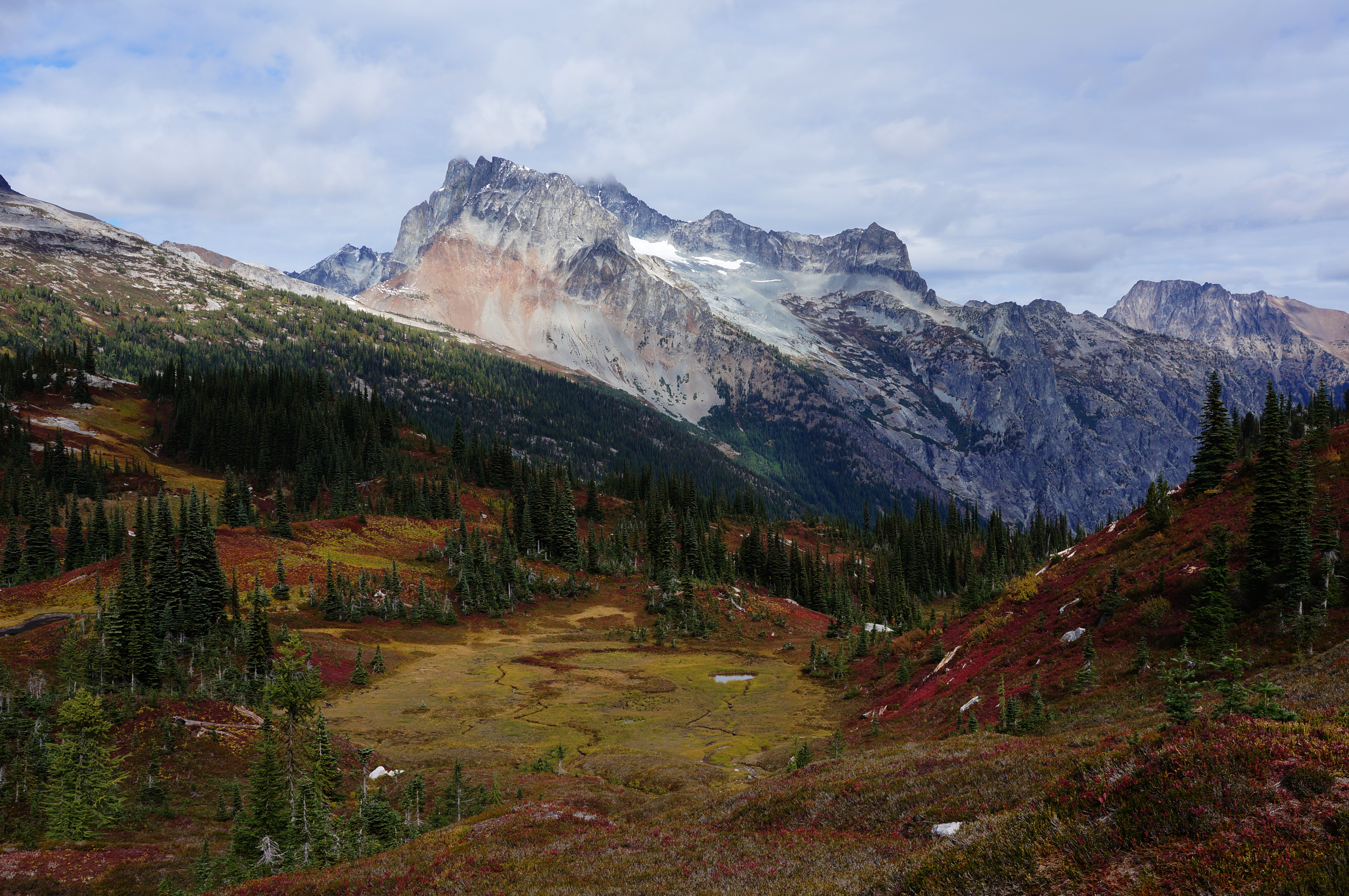
Bonanza from Lyman Lakes area

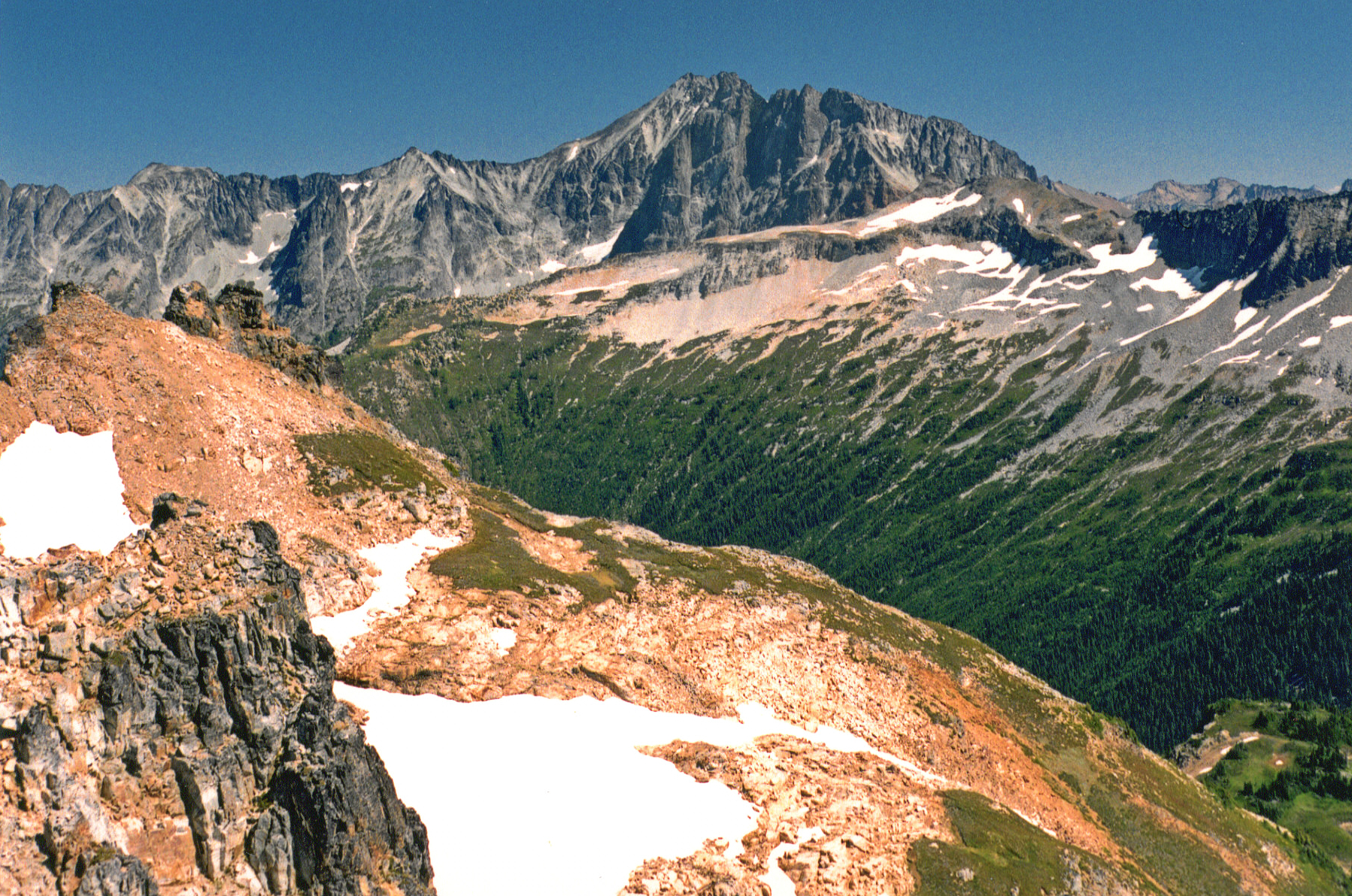
Bonanza and North Star Mountain, from Plummer Mountain

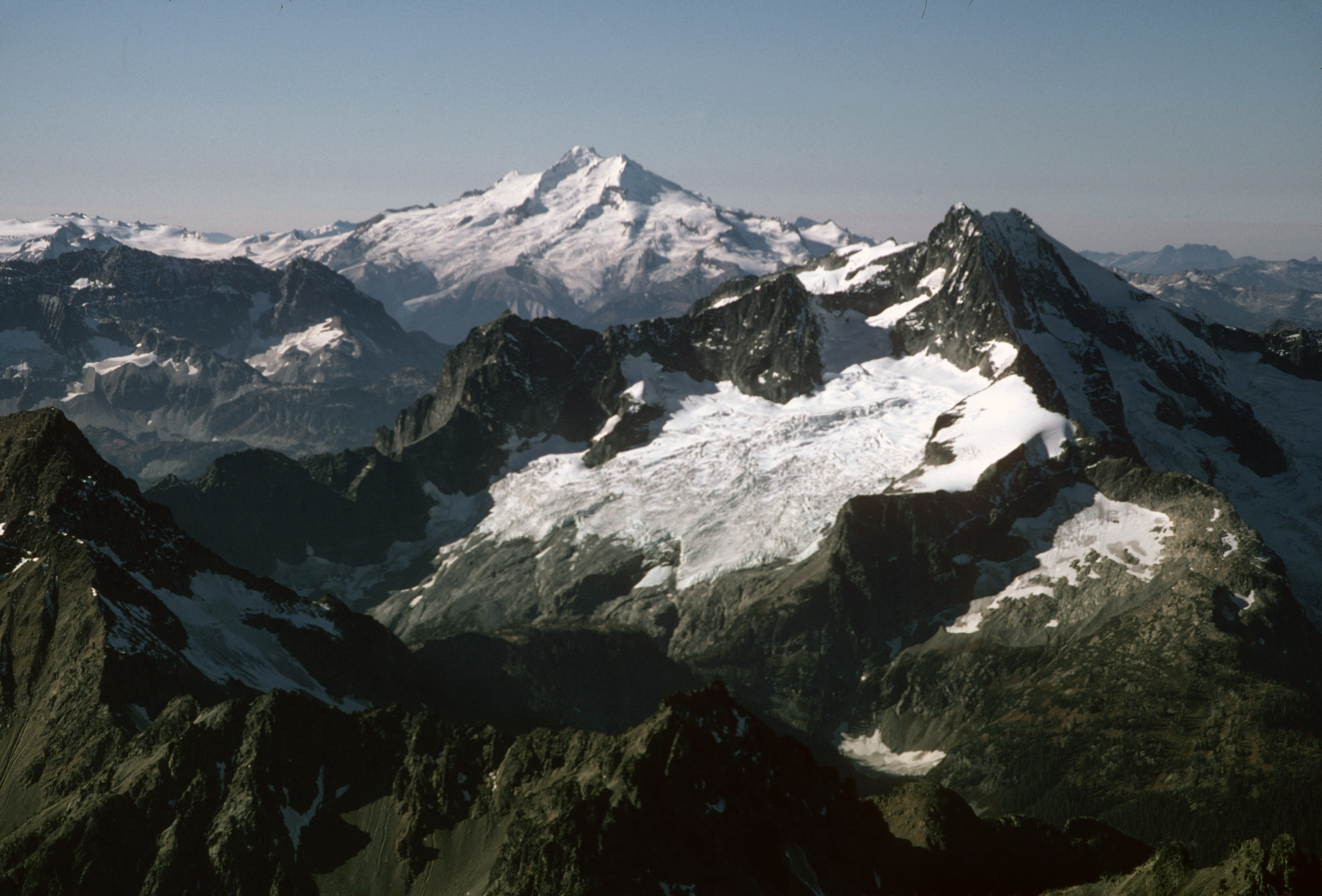
Aerial view looking over the top of Martin Peak at Bonanza (right), and Glacier Peak.
