= Entiat Mountains =

Mountain range in Washington, USA

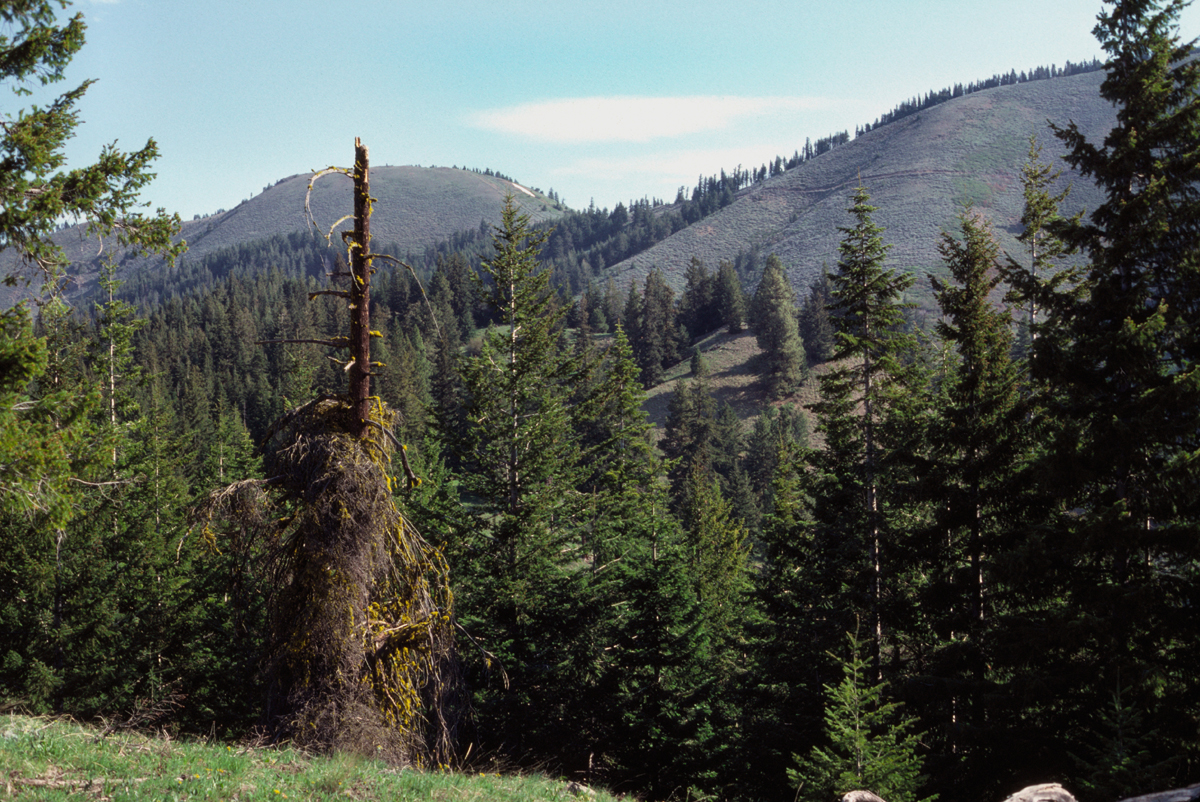
- Chumstick Mountain Summit from primitive access road

Highest point
- Peak: Mount Fernow
- Elevation: 9,249 ft (2,819 m)

Dimensions
- Length: 53 mi (85 km) north-south
- Width: 32 mi (51 km) east-west
- Area: 612 mi^{2} (1,590 km^{2})

Geography
- Location within Washington (state)
- Country: United States
- State: Washington
- County: Chelan
- Range coordinates: 47°50′N 120°34′W
- Parent range: North Cascades (Cascade Range)
- Borders on: Chelan Mountains, Wenatchee Mountains and Columbia Plateau

The Entiat Mountains, or Entiat Range, is a mountain range in the U.S. state of Washington. Located west of the Columbia River, north of the Wenatchee River, and south of the Entiat River, the range is part of the North Cascades section of the Cascade Range. The Entiat Range is relatively narrow east to west and long north to south. The Entiat River valley separates the Entiat Mountains from the Chelan Mountains to the northeast. To the west and south, across the Wenatchee River and tributaries such as the Chiwawa River are the Wenatchee Mountains.

The Entiat Mountains stretch south to the Columbia River between the mouths of the Entiat and Wenatchee Rivers. The northern end the Entiat Range merges with the northern end of the Chelan Mountains. Most of the range is within Wenatchee National Forest. The northern end is part of the Glacier Peak Wilderness.

The highest peak of the Entiat Mountains is Mount Fernow, at 9,249 ft (2,819 m). Other major peaks include Seven Fingered Jack, Mount Maude, Copper Peak, Dumbell Mountain, Spectacle Buttes, Ice Box, and Buckskin Mountain. All these peaks are over 8,000 ft (2,400 m) and the three highest are over 9,000 ft (2,700 m). They are all located in the northern part of the Entiat Range. The highest peaks of the southern portion are under 7,000 ft (2,100 m). Significant peaks of the southern Entiat Range include Cougar Mountain, Tyee Mountain, Sugarloaf Peak, Chumstick Mountain, and Burch Mountain.

The name comes from the Entiat tribe. A large number of place names, including many of the mountains, were given by Albert H. Sylvester.

In July 2014, several wildfires, including the Mills Canyon Fire and the Kelly Mountain Fire, burned in the Entiat Mountains.

== See also ==
- List of mountain ranges
- List of mountain ranges in Washington (state)
- Carne Mountain
