= Holden Village, Washington =

Lutheran Christian center in Washington, US

Coordinates: 48°11′56.63″N 120°46′26.93″W

Location of Holden Village in the state of Washington, US (click on marker for GeoHack map)

Holden Village is a year-round Lutheran Christian center in the North Cascade mountains of the U.S. state of Washington. Formerly the site of one of the largest copper mines in the United States, the Holden mine, Holden is accessible only by a Lake Chelan passenger ferry, or by hiking in through the Cascade Mountains. Holden Village is the largest retreat center in the nation operating under a special use permit from the United States Department of Agriculture - Forest Service.

As of 2026, Holden Village is closed to guests due to the access road, FR 8301, suffering significant damage during a period of statewide flooding in December 2025.

== Location ==
Holden Village is located in the Cascade Range in Washington, in the Wenatchee National Forest. Inaccessible by car, visitors (volunteers, guests, and through-hikers) generally take a ferry up Lake Chelan from Chelan or Fields Point Landing to Lucerne where they board a Village bus which takes them up an 11-mile (18 km) gravel road through a set of 12 switchbacks, and into Holden Village. Holden staff and guests greet arriving buses with welcoming applause. It is also possible to hike into Holden Village through the Cascade mountains using a number of routes.

== History ==
=== Mining era (1896–1957) ===
In 1896, James Henry Holden made his first claim on the area which would later become Holden Village. However, because of the expense and difficulty involved in transporting copper from the isolated mine, the operation did not begin its full productivity until 1937. By 1938 the mine had become successful and processed 2,000 short tons (1,800 tonnes) of copper ore daily. With the success of the mine came miners and their families, still recovering from the Great Depression. The Howe Sound Company, which owned the mine at the time, built a townsite on the north side of Railroad Creek soon after the mine began to thrive. The townsite, Holden, Washington, consisted of a number of dormitories, a gymnasium, bowling alley, mess hall, school, and hospital, among other things. West of the townsite was a patch of small houses intended for miners with families in tow.

The Holden Mine and the town of Holden flourished for many years despite the isolation. However, after World War II the price of metals fell and the resources of the mine began to diminish. The mine was closed in 1957.

=== The Village (1961–present) ===
With the closing of the mine in 1957, the Howe Sound Company sought a buyer for the Holden Mine and townsite. With an asking price of $100,000, the remote piece of property did not sell. However, Wes Prieb, a 34-year-old student at the Lutheran Bible Institute of Seattle (later known as Trinity Lutheran College), saw the potential for a spiritual retreat center at the old mine. He originally asked the Howe Sound Company to give the mine to the Lutheran Church as a gift. The company initially refused, but eventually agreed to sell the mine and townsite for $1.00. In the end, no money changed hands, but the title was transferred to the Bible college in 1960.

With the transfer of the mine and buildings came a multitude of problems for the Lutheran Bible Institute: The structures were old and suffering from several years of neglect. Many were becoming structurally unsafe; the remainder did not meet modernized building codes. The remote Village itself was a significant distance from the college's campus in Seattle. With the help of large brigades of volunteers from the Lutheran synods of the day, the Village was successfully restored and many of the buildings repurposed. The Village began to function as a summer retreat center soon after. Originally, the Lutheran Bible Institute imagined a summer-only center and maintained limited staff on hand for the first few winters. However, both the infrastructure needs of the community and the natural beauty of Holden Village in the winter led to the creation of a year-round retreat center.

=== Mine remediation ===
The Howe Sound Company's Holden Mine was profitable in part by making few outlays for the impacts of its on-site operations. For example, the low-grade copper ore was concentrated and the tailings were dumped next to the mine portal, covering many acres of wetlands. Although this practice was not unusual for its time, it took place within a remote and otherwise untouched area subsequently surrounded on three sides by the Glacier Peak Wilderness Area, a federally-designated wilderness. Modern regulations put into place after the mine's closure prohibited such practices, and ultimately the U.S. Environmental Protection Agency declared the Holden Mine area as a Superfund site. The impact from the former mining operations at Holden is mild compared to other Superfund sites in the United States, in terms of their impact on human populations, due to being a remote area away from population centers. The waters of Railroad Creek flow directly past the tailing piles, which introduces significant amounts of iron to the water, reducing the stream's biodiversity as well as cementing the stream bed.

Prior to the interim action of 1989, when the tailing piles were covered with gravel, winds above 10 mph (16 km/h) would often spread the fine dust in the tailing piles through the air, lowering air quality locally. Holden and its partner agencies have reduced wind-borne air pollution from the tailing piles by planting trees atop the tailing piles, with mixed success. Federal and state agencies have also sought solutions to mineral contamination of the water flowing from the mine into the Railroad Creek watershed. Rio Tinto Group was identified by the EPA as the Potentially Responsible Party in the EPA's process of identifying the corporate entity currently liable for the remediation costs. The process of finding a mutually agreeable solution to these problems was a long and onerous one, but an agreement was eventually reached. The negotiations between state, federal, and Holden Village entities and the public can be seen in a federal report and its fourteen proposed alternative solutions.

Remediation efforts occurred during the years of 2011–2016. In the summer of 2011, Holden conducted its normal program, but also began to see work and workers (up to 65) in and around the Village. Continuing during the summer of 2012, these early works projects prepared the way for the heavy construction years of 2013–2015. During this phase, Holden Village made creative changes to its program as it housed and fed 200+ construction people working in shifts 24/7 on the project. The number of workers decreased in 2016 and Holden volunteers took on Village renewal projects. Holden Village welcomed guests again for Christmas 2016 and New Year's 2017 and restarted normal operations in spring 2017. There will then be a five-year period of testing and analysis to determine whether further work will be necessary in the eastern portion of the affected area. If required, this additional work would have an undetermined (at this time, at least) impact on Holden Village.

== Holden Village today ==
Today, Holden Village operates as a year-round retreat center. It relies heavily on volunteers for all day-to-day services. The Village respects and welcomes people of all faiths and backgrounds as a part of its community. Holden Village is inundated with visitors during the summer months when families come to stay for a few days, a week, or a month at a time. Holden Village runs a variety of programming in the summers, with classes focusing on science, theology, art and philosophy for all age levels. Winters in the village are much more quiet, although it is a popular destination during the Christmas and New Year celebrations. Holden Village receives large amounts of snow in the winter (averaging over 260 inches (6.6 m)) making snowshoeing and cross-country skiing favorite activities.

=== Transportation ===
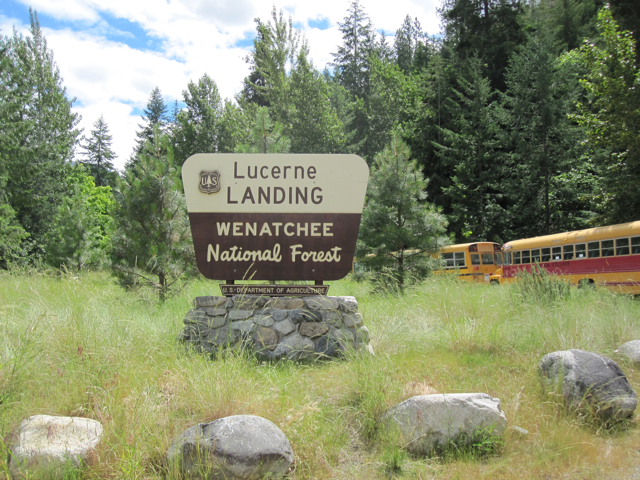
What visitors used to see when disembarking from Lady of the Lake at Lucerne Landing

Holden Village remains nearly as isolated today as it was at its founding, and it is still impossible to reach the Village by car alone. Buses leave Holden Village in the morning and head down the mountain on a treacherous set of switchbacks. The landing on Lake Chelan associated with Holden Village is called Lucerne, and it is here that the buses meet the daily boats coming and going. The Chelan Boat Company, located in Chelan, Washington, runs two boats (the Lady of the Lake II and the Lady Express) to and from the Village. These boats ferry people up and down the lake, making stops at the resort town of Stehekin, trailheads, personal properties, and at Lucerne for visitors of Holden Village. Although some visitors to the Village leave their vehicle in Chelan and take the ferry from the Chelan Boat Dock, others drive part way up the lake to take advantage of the large parking lot at the Field's Point Landing near Twenty-Five Mile Creek State Park. Holden Village operates a bed and breakfast a few miles from Field's Point, catering mostly to Village visitors who want to use this landing.

=== Hiking ===
In addition to short day-hikes in the mountains surrounding the Village, through-hikers can reach it on foot from several routes.

- The primary and most popular route starts at the Phelps Creek Trail head near the end of Chiwawa River Road. The route is mostly flat for 5 miles (8.0 km), then climbs quickly up Spider Glacier to Spider Gap, and then down through the Lyman Lakes (located about 6 miles (9.7 km) west of Holden), at which point a well-defined trail leads into Holden along Railroad Creek and past Hart Lake.
- Hikers from the western side of the mountains can access Holden with a 14-mile (23 km) hike up the Suiattle River Trail and Pacific Crest Trail to Suiattle Pass, leaving only a 2-mile (3.2 km) hike to Lyman Lakes via Cloudy Pass.
- Holden is accessible from Stehekin via semi-direct trails through Devore Creek and Hilgard Pass, While the 2015 Wolverine Fire destroyed much of the trail system in the area, trail crews have now restored the trails to trekking order.

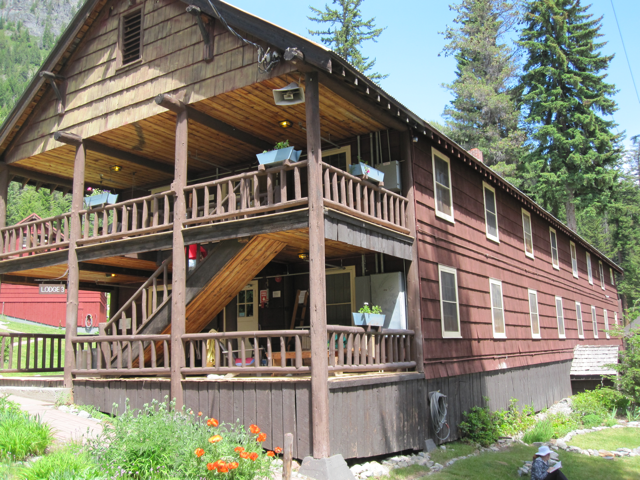
Lodge 3 in June 2010

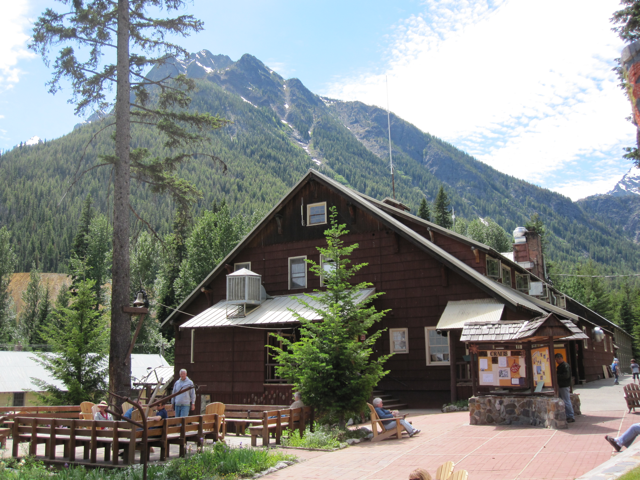
The Dining Hall's exterior, June 2010 (Copper Peak in background)

=== Community ===
The year-round residents of Holden Village are largely volunteers. Most residents have specific jobs—from kitchen duty and housekeeping to heavy equipment mechanic and utilities manager—which they perform throughout the year. Communal living is the norm in the village, and guests are integrated into the volunteer culture. Resident families generally live in a chalet, sometimes with another couple or a second family. Other residents live together in the dormitories, called lodges. Meals are eaten together at prescribed times in the dining hall, and meat is served sparingly. While guests and volunteers are given wide latitude concerning how they spend their time during the day, Holden Village expects everyone to come together for the evening Vespers service each day and the Sunday service. Holden Village is known for the Holden Evening Prayer (known as Vespers '86 in the Village) service, a form of the traditional Vespers. Holden Evening Prayer was composed by Marty Haugen, a prolific liturgical composer, while he was on sabbatical in the Village during the winter of 1986.

=== Domke Lake Fire (2007) ===
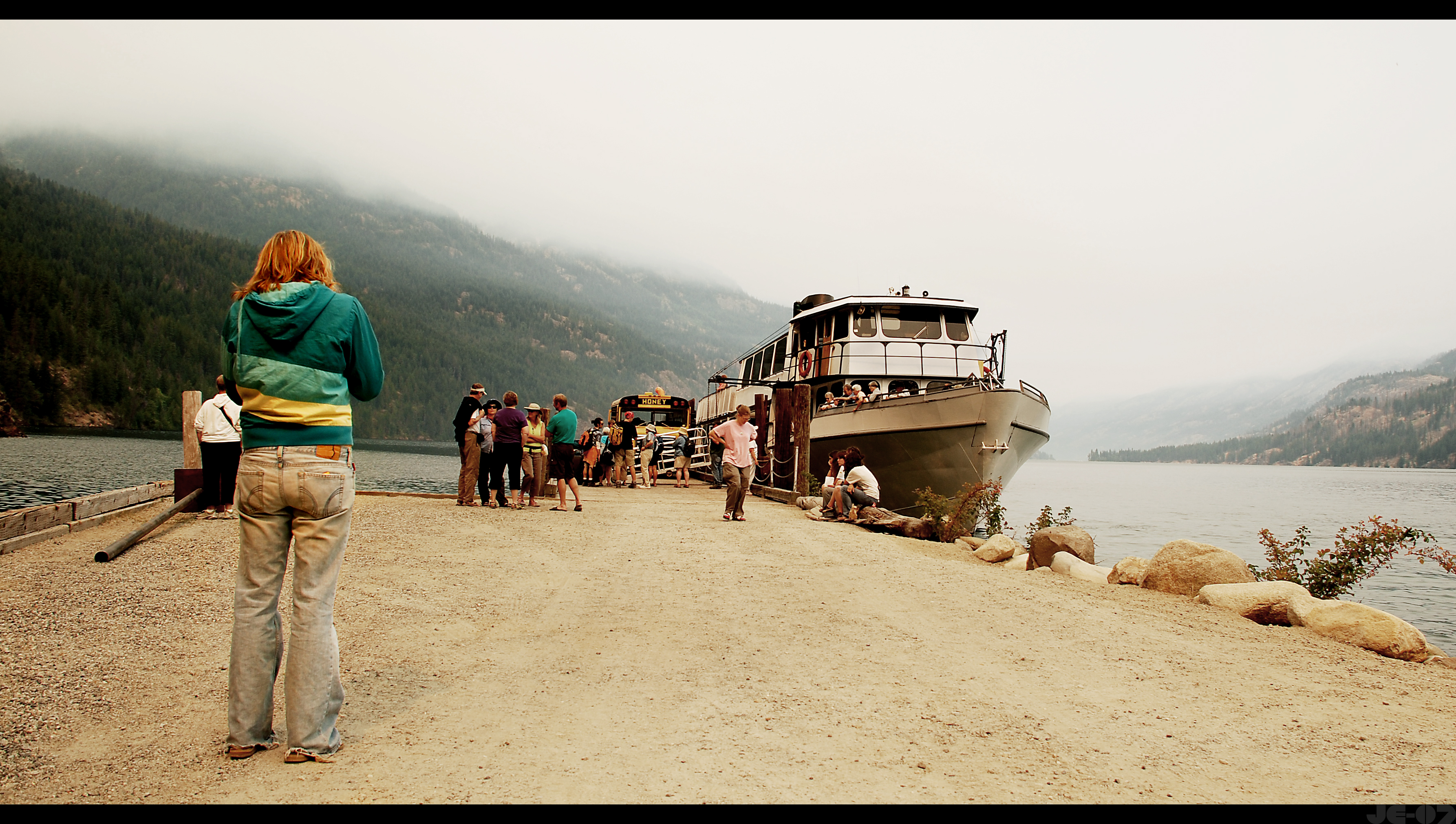
Lucerne landing during the staff evacuation of Holden Village on August 14, 2007

In August 2007, Holden Village was forced to evacuate approximately 300 guests and staff because of the advance of the nearby Domke Lake Complex wildfire, leaving about 25 staff to maintain and keep the Village operational. While the Village itself was never threatened directly, the fire was in danger of cutting off the single road into the Village. During the emergency, Holden Village provided housing and meals to men and women who were fighting the wildfire. Six weeks later, on September 21, the Village reopened to guests.

=== Wolverine Fire (2015) ===
Drought conditions throughout the state of Washington resulted in many devastating wildfires throughout 2015. On June 29, 2015, lightning sparked a fire in Wolverine Creek, which expanded toward Lucerne and became part of the Chelan Complex fire, resulting in the evacuation of the Village (residents, guests, and mine remediation workers) on August 1 and 2, just before the fire cut off road access. A small crew of 4-5 Villagers remained behind to tend the fire defense sprinklers (which operated 24 hours a day using water from Railroad Creek), serve meals to the hotshot firefighter crews working in the nearby mountains, protect the wooden structures from falling embers, and assist with cutting and clearing a protective burn ring around the Village and mine remediation site. The Chelan Complex Fire continued to spread downlake, resulting in the evacuation of the Holden Bed & Breakfast and Lake House on August 15 and threatening the cities of Chelan and Manson. By August 28 the fire had moved on enough to allow some staff members to return, and on September 7 all Villagers were cleared to return.

== Climate ==
Climate data for Holden Village, Washington, 1991–2020 normals, 1962-2020 extremes: 3218ft (981m)
Month	Jan	Feb	Mar	Apr	May	Jun	Jul	Aug	Sep	Oct	Nov	Dec	Year
Record high °F (°C)	58 (14)	57 (14)	64 (18)	85 (29)	91 (33)	95 (35)	101 (38)	98 (37)	96 (36)	82 (28)	65 (18)	53 (12)	101 (38)
Mean maximum °F (°C)	44.5 (6.9)	45.2 (7.3)	54.0 (12.2)	65.3 (18.5)	78.9 (26.1)	85.4 (29.7)	91.5 (33.1)	91.4 (33.0)	83.0 (28.3)	69.3 (20.7)	49.7 (9.8)	41.6 (5.3)	93.4 (34.1)
Mean daily maximum °F (°C)	28.2 (−2.1)	33.8 (1.0)	40.9 (4.9)	49.5 (9.7)	60.1 (15.6)	66.4 (19.1)	75.8 (24.3)	75.8 (24.3)	66.5 (19.2)	50.8 (10.4)	34.5 (1.4)	27.2 (−2.7)	50.8 (10.4)
Daily mean °F (°C)	22.4 (−5.3)	25.9 (−3.4)	32.1 (0.1)	39.4 (4.1)	48.3 (9.1)	54.4 (12.4)	61.3 (16.3)	61.0 (16.1)	53.2 (11.8)	41.4 (5.2)	29.4 (−1.4)	22.2 (−5.4)	40.9 (5.0)
Mean daily minimum °F (°C)	16.7 (−8.5)	18.0 (−7.8)	23.4 (−4.8)	29.2 (−1.6)	36.5 (2.5)	42.5 (5.8)	46.7 (8.2)	46.3 (7.9)	39.8 (4.3)	32.0 (0.0)	24.4 (−4.2)	17.2 (−8.2)	31.1 (−0.5)
Mean minimum °F (°C)	−2.0 (−18.9)	0.1 (−17.7)	8.2 (−13.2)	18.9 (−7.3)	25.9 (−3.4)	32.5 (0.3)	36.5 (2.5)	35.1 (1.7)	29.3 (−1.5)	20.5 (−6.4)	9.0 (−12.8)	−0.4 (−18.0)	−7.3 (−21.8)
Record low °F (°C)	−22 (−30)	−19 (−28)	−7 (−22)	6 (−14)	15 (−9)	23 (−5)	28 (−2)	23 (−5)	22 (−6)	6 (−14)	−10 (−23)	−32 (−36)	−32 (−36)
Average precipitation inches (mm)	6.99 (178)	4.64 (118)	3.99 (101)	1.81 (46)	1.39 (35)	1.24 (31)	0.68 (17)	0.81 (21)	1.67 (42)	4.38 (111)	8.18 (208)	7.20 (183)	42.98 (1,091)
Average snowfall inches (cm)	63.80 (162.1)	46.90 (119.1)	34.40 (87.4)	4.00 (10.2)	0.20 (0.51)	0.00 (0.00)	0.00 (0.00)	0.00 (0.00)	0.00 (0.00)	3.20 (8.1)	38.10 (96.8)	83.10 (211.1)	273.7 (695.31)
Average extreme snow depth inches (cm)	69 (180)	72 (180)	71 (180)	50 (130)	18 (46)	0 (0)	0 (0)	0 (0)	0 (0)	3 (7.6)	24 (61)	53 (130)	80 (200)
Average precipitation days (≥ 0.01 in)	17.4	14.0	13.8	9.6	9.8	8.9	5.0	5.5	7.9	14.3	17.1	18.6	141.9
Average snowy days (≥ 0.1 in)	15.7	12.6	10.6	3.4	0.2	0.0	0.0	0.0	0.0	1.7	11.2	17.4	72.8
Source 1: NOAA
Source 2: XMACIS2 (records, monthly max/min & snow depth)

Climate data for Holden Village, Washington (1981–2010)
Month	Jan	Feb	Mar	Apr	May	Jun	Jul	Aug	Sep	Oct	Nov	Dec	Year
Record high °F (°C)	58 (14)	57 (14)	64 (18)	85 (29)	91 (33)	101 (38)	101 (38)	98 (37)	96 (36)	82 (28)	65 (18)	60 (16)	101 (38)
Mean maximum °F (°C)	44 (7)	47 (8)	55 (13)	65 (18)	78 (26)	85 (29)	91 (33)	91 (33)	82 (28)	70 (21)	51 (11)	43 (6)	93 (34)
Mean daily maximum °F (°C)	30.0 (−1.1)	34.6 (1.4)	41.4 (5.2)	51.1 (10.6)	61.8 (16.6)	68.4 (20.2)	77.8 (25.4)	77.6 (25.3)	68.0 (20.0)	52.4 (11.3)	35.4 (1.9)	28.7 (−1.8)	52.3 (11.3)
Daily mean °F (°C)	23.4 (−4.8)	26.3 (−3.2)	32.5 (0.3)	39.7 (4.3)	48.7 (9.3)	55.2 (12.9)	61.8 (16.6)	61.5 (16.4)	53.6 (12.0)	41.8 (5.4)	29.9 (−1.2)	22.4 (−5.3)	41.4 (5.2)
Mean daily minimum °F (°C)	16.8 (−8.4)	17.1 (−8.3)	22.5 (−5.3)	28.4 (−2.0)	35.5 (1.9)	41.8 (5.4)	46.0 (7.8)	45.6 (7.6)	39.1 (3.9)	31.3 (−0.4)	23.7 (−4.6)	16.3 (−8.7)	30.3 (−0.9)
Mean minimum °F (°C)	−3 (−19)	0 (−18)	8 (−13)	19 (−7)	26 (−3)	31 (−1)	36 (2)	35 (2)	29 (−2)	21 (−6)	8 (−13)	−2 (−19)	−9 (−23)
Record low °F (°C)	−22 (−30)	−19 (−28)	−7 (−22)	6 (−14)	15 (−9)	23 (−5)	28 (−2)	23 (−5)	22 (−6)	6 (−14)	−10 (−23)	−32 (−36)	−32 (−36)
Average precipitation inches (mm)	5.42 (138)	4.51 (115)	2.96 (75)	1.28 (33)	0.99 (25)	1.35 (34)	0.65 (17)	0.95 (24)	1.58 (40)	3.95 (100)	5.43 (138)	5.98 (152)	35.05 (891)
Average snowfall inches (cm)	90.1 (229)	66.4 (169)	46.7 (119)	7.9 (20)	0.5 (1.3)	trace	0.0 (0.0)	0.0 (0.0)	trace	8.5 (22)	51.1 (130)	83.9 (213)	355.1 (903.3)
Source: Desert Research Institute
