= Railroad Creek =

Stream in the U.S. state of Washington

Coordinates: 48°12′09″N 120°35′43″W

Railroad Creek is a stream in the U.S. state of Washington. It flows into Lake Chelan in the unincorporated community of Lucerne.

Railroad Creek was named because a railroad was proposed to be built near its course, but this project never materialized. The 1946 MGM film, Courage of Lassie, was shot on location near Holden.

== See also ==
- List of rivers of Washington (state)
