= Pinnacle Mountain (Washington) =

Mountain in Washington (state), United States

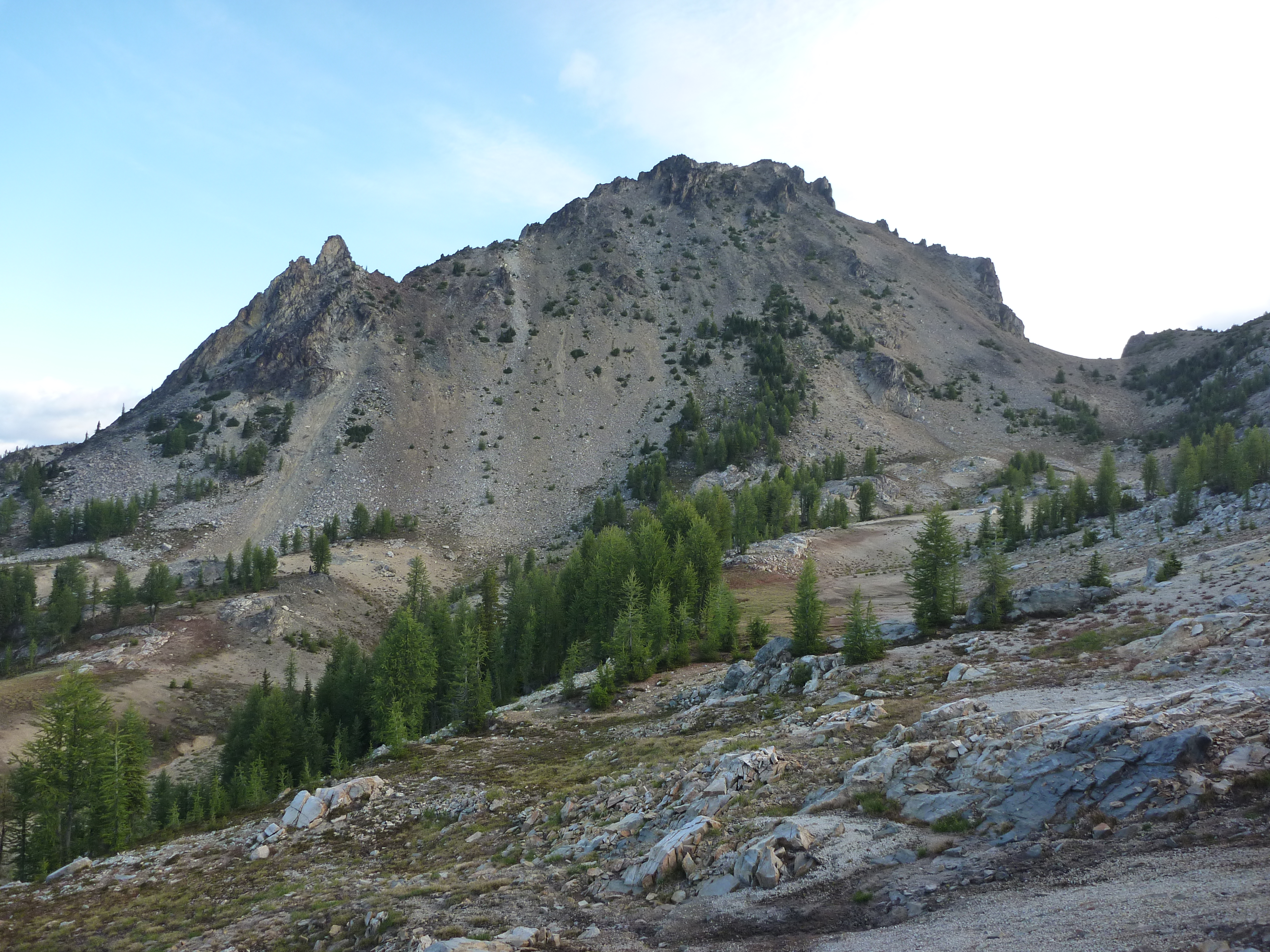
- Pinnacle Mountain, south aspect

Highest point
- Elevation: 8,400 ft (2,560 m)
- Prominence: 1,744 ft (532 m)
- Parent peak: Emerald Peak (8,419 ft)
- Isolation: 1.88 mi (3.03 km)
- Coordinates: 48°07′55″N 120°40′14″W

Geography
- Location within Washington (state) Location within the United States
- Interactive map of Pinnacle Mountain
- Country: United States
- State: Washington
- County: Chelan
- Protected area: Glacier Peak Wilderness
- Parent range: Chelan Mountains; North Cascades; Cascade Range
- Topo map: USGS Pinnacle Mountain

Geology
- Rock type(s): hornblende quartz diorite, granodiorite

Climbing
- First ascent: 1948 Dwight Watson, Ken Fleming
- Easiest route: class 3 scrambling South slopes

Pinnacle Mountain is an 8,400-foot (2,560-metre) granitic multi-peak massif located in the Chelan Mountains, in Chelan County of Washington state. The mountain is situated in the Glacier Peak Wilderness of the North Cascades, on land managed by Wenatchee National Forest. Pinnacle Mountain ranks as the fourth-highest peak in the Chelan Mountains, and 77th-highest summit in Washington state. The nearest higher neighbor is Saska Peak, 1.9 mi (3.1 km) to the southeast, and Emerald Peak is positioned 2.25 mi (3.62 km) to the east-southeast. Precipitation runoff from the peak drains into the Entiat River and Chelan River drainage basins.

== Climate ==
Weather fronts coming off the Pacific Ocean travel northeast toward the Cascade Mountains. As fronts approach the North Cascades, they are forced upward by the peaks (orographic lift), causing them to drop their moisture in the form of rain or snow onto the Cascades. As a result, the North Cascades experience high precipitation, especially during the winter months in the form of snowfall. During winter months, weather is usually cloudy, but due to high pressure systems over the Pacific Ocean that intensify during summer months, there is often little or no cloud cover during the summer.

== Geology ==
Pinnacle Mountain is composed primarily of granodiorite and hornblende quartz diorite, minerals of the Cardinal Peak pluton. The North Cascades feature some of the most rugged topography in the Cascade Range with craggy peaks, spires, ridges, and deep glacial valleys. Geological events occurring many years ago created the diverse topography and drastic elevation changes over the Cascade Range leading to the various climate differences. The history of the formation of the Cascade Mountains dates back millions of years ago to the late Eocene Epoch. With the North American Plate overriding the Pacific Plate, episodes of volcanic igneous activity persisted. Glacier Peak, a stratovolcano that is 20 miles (32 km) west of Pinnacle Mountain, began forming in the mid-Pleistocene. In addition, small fragments of the oceanic and continental lithosphere called terranes created the North Cascades about 50 million years ago. During the Pleistocene period dating back over two million years ago, glaciation advancing and retreating repeatedly scoured the landscape leaving deposits of rock debris. The U-shaped cross section of the river valleys is a result of recent glaciation. Uplift and faulting in combination with glaciation have been the dominant processes which have created the tall peaks and deep valleys of the North Cascades area.

== Gallery ==
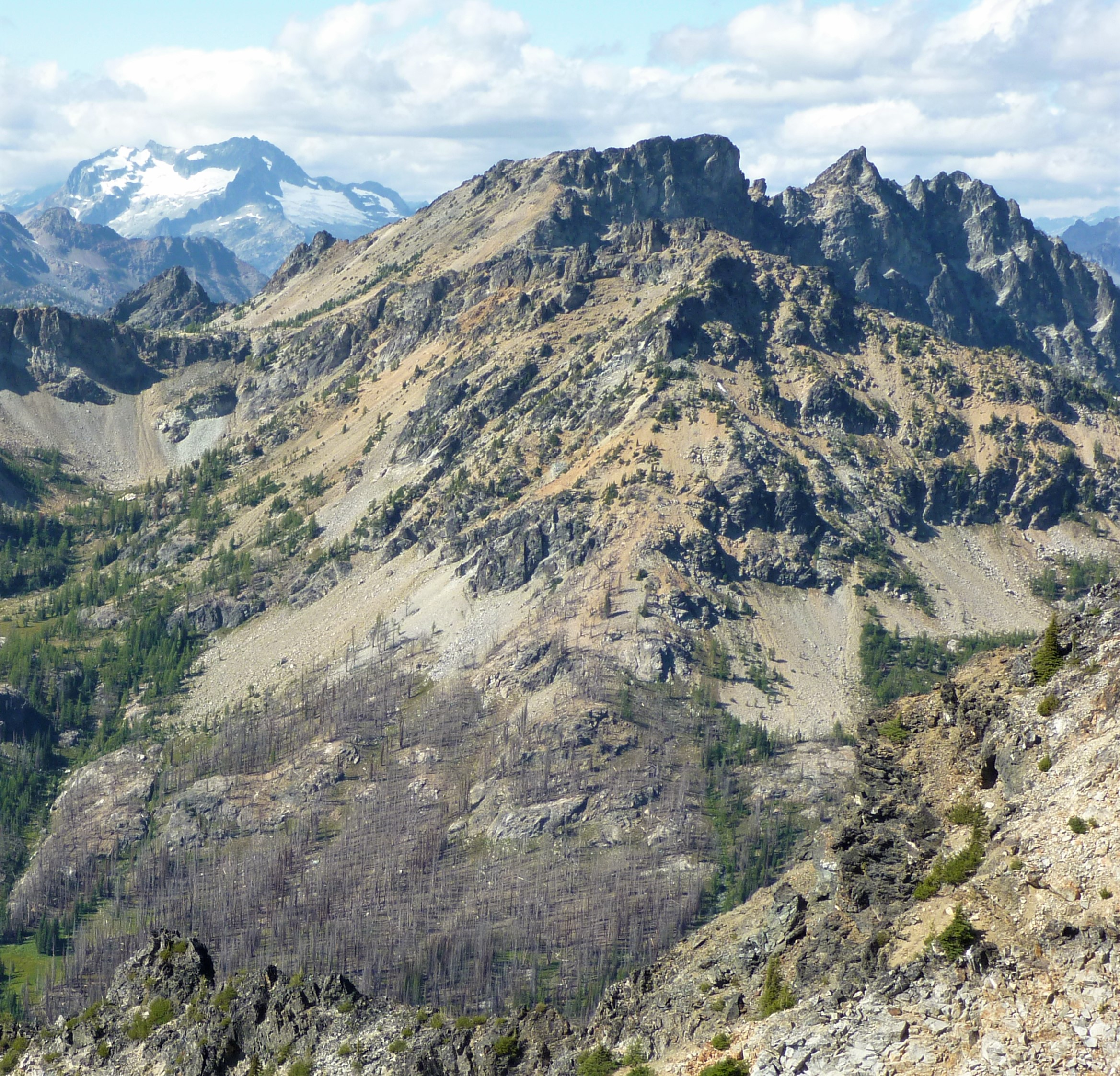
Pinnacle's southeast aspect from Saska Peak

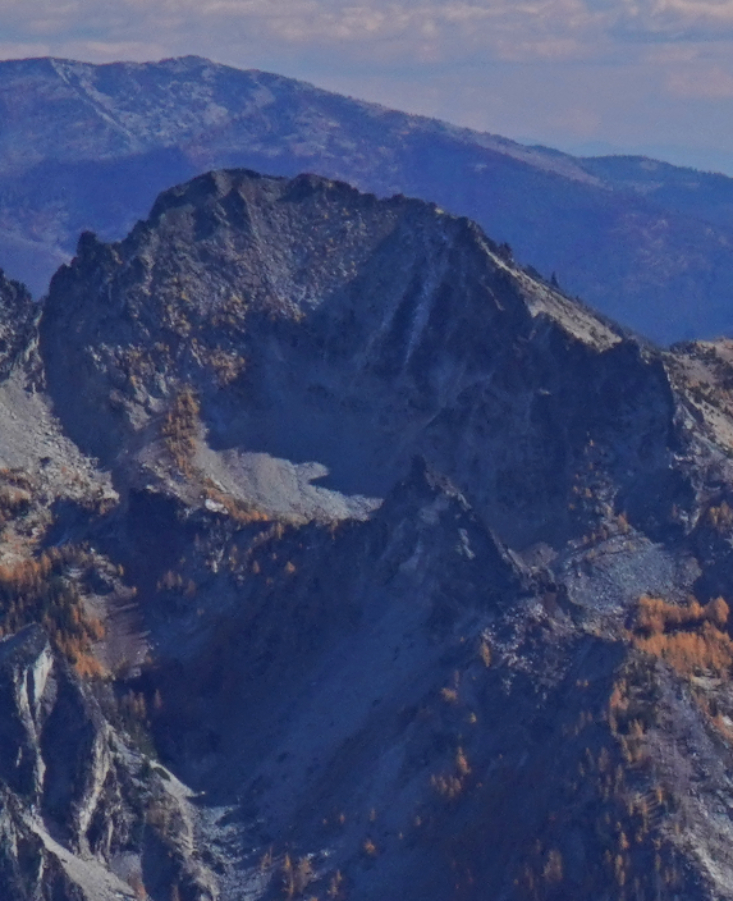
West aspect, from Mt. Maude

== See also ==
- Geography of the North Cascades
- List of Highest Mountain Peaks in Washington
