= Carne Mountain =

Mountain in Washington (state), United States

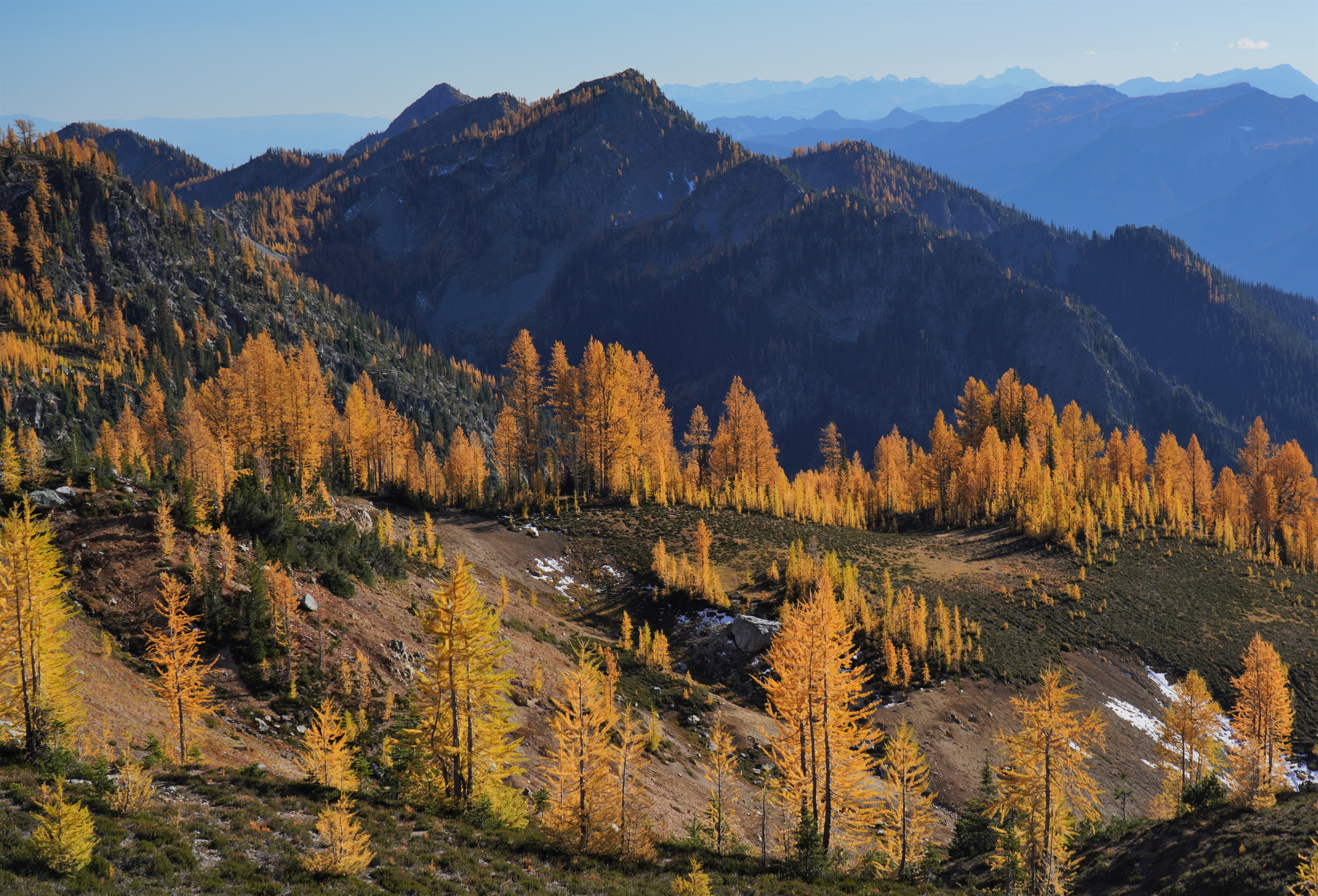
- Carne Mountain from the north

Highest point
- Elevation: 7,080 ft (2,158 m)
- Prominence: 480 ft (146 m)
- Parent peak: Chilly Peak (7,960 ft)
- Isolation: 1.38 mi (2.22 km)
- Coordinates: 48°05′19″N 120°48′11″W

Geography
- Location within Washington (state) Location within the United States
- Country: United States
- State: Washington
- County: Chelan
- Protected area: Glacier Peak Wilderness
- Parent range: Entiat Mountains; North Cascades; Cascade Range
- Topo map: USGS Trinity

Climbing
- Easiest route: class 2 hiking

Carne Mountain is a 7,080+ ft (2,160+ m) double-summit mountain located in the Entiat Mountains, a sub-range of the North Cascades, in Chelan County of Washington state. Carne Mountain is situated on the boundary of the Glacier Peak Wilderness, on land managed by the Okanogan–Wenatchee National Forest. Its nearest higher neighbor is Chilly Peak, 1.4 miles (2.3 km) to the northeast, and Ice Box is set 1.7 miles (2.7 km) to the north. Precipitation runoff from the mountain drains east into Rock Creek, or west into Phelps Creek, both tributaries of the Chiwawa River. This peak can be accessed via the 3.7-mile Carne Mountain Trail which gains 3,600 feet of elevation. The mountain once had a fire lookout building on its south peak. Views from the top include Bandit Peak, Brahma Peak, Buck Mountain, Fortress Mountain, Chiwawa Mountain, Mount Maude, Ice Box, and Chilly. This mountain was named by Albert Hale Sylvester for English clergyman W. Stanely Carnes. This feature is pronounced "karn".

== Climate ==
Lying east of the Cascade crest, the area around Carne Mountain is a bit drier than areas to the west. Summers can bring warm temperatures and occasional thunderstorms. Weather fronts originating in the Pacific Ocean travel northeast toward the Cascade Mountains. As fronts approach the North Cascades, they are forced upward by the peaks of the Cascade Range, causing them to drop their moisture in the form of rain or snow onto the Cascades (Orographic lift). As a result, the North Cascades experiences high precipitation, especially during the winter months in the form of snowfall. With its impressive height, Carne Mountain can have snow on it in late-spring and early-fall, and can be very cold in the winter.

== Geology ==
The North Cascades features some of the most rugged topography in the Cascade Range with craggy peaks, ridges, and deep glacial valleys. Geological events occurring many years ago created the diverse topography and drastic elevation changes over the Cascade Range leading to various climate differences. These climate differences lead to vegetation variety defining the ecoregions in this area.

The history of the formation of the Cascade Mountains dates back millions of years ago to the late Eocene Epoch. With the North American Plate overriding the Pacific Plate, episodes of volcanic igneous activity persisted. Glacier Peak, a stratovolcano that is 14.5 mi (23.3 km) west of Carne Mountain, began forming in the mid-Pleistocene.

During the Pleistocene period dating back over two million years ago, glaciation advancing and retreating repeatedly scoured the landscape leaving deposits of rock debris. The U-shaped cross section of the river valleys is a result of recent glaciation. Uplift and faulting in combination with glaciation have been the dominant processes which have created the tall peaks and deep valleys of the North Cascades area.

== Gallery ==
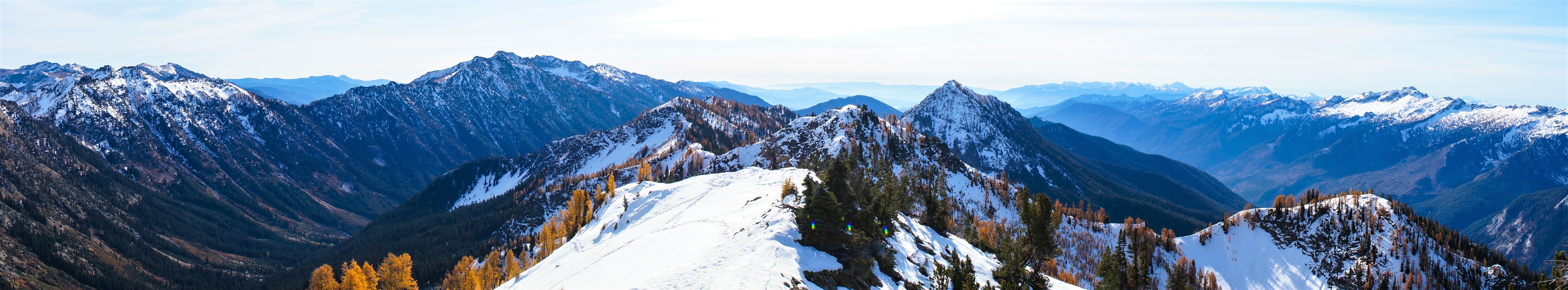
Panorama from summit of Carne Mountain looking south. (Fifth of July Mountain left of center)

== See also ==
- Geography of Washington (state)
- Geology of the Pacific Northwest
