= Bearcat Ridge =

Mountain in Washington (state), United States

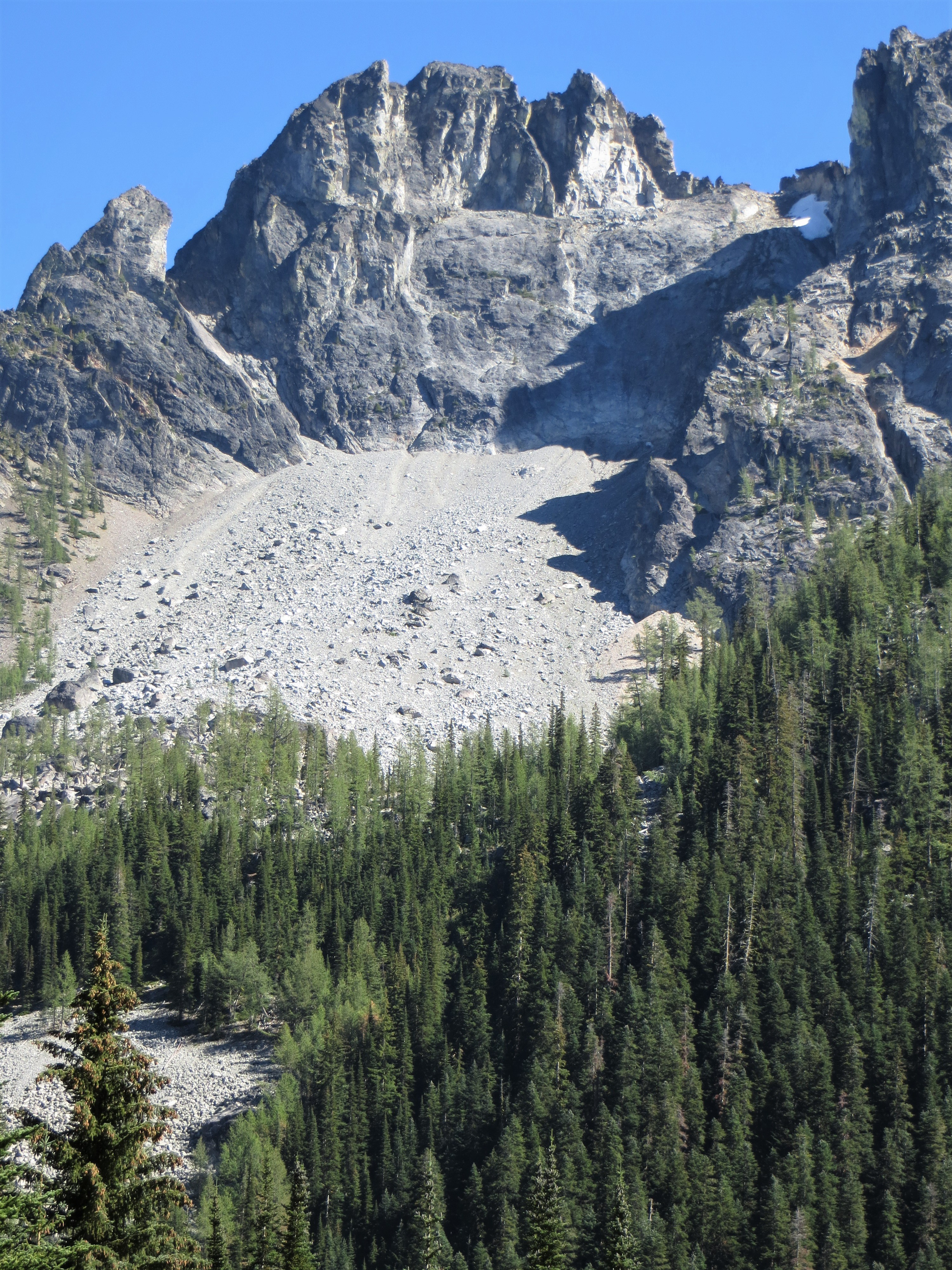
- Bearcat Ridge high point, west aspect

Highest point
- Elevation: 8,033 ft (2,448 m)
- Prominence: 718 ft (219 m)
- Parent peak: Emerald Peak (8,422 ft)
- Isolation: 1.09 mi (1.75 km)
- Coordinates: 48°07′43″N 120°37′00″W

Geography
- Location within Washington (state) Location within the United States
- Interactive map of Bearcat Ridge
- Country: United States
- State: Washington
- County: Chelan
- Protected area: Glacier Peak Wilderness
- Parent range: Chelan Mountains; North Cascades; Cascade Range
- Topo map: USGS Lucerne

Geology
- Rock type(s): hornblende quartz diorite, granodiorite

Climbing
- First ascent

Bearcat Ridge is an 8,033-foot (2,448-metre) mountain ridge located in the Chelan Mountains, in Chelan County of Washington state. It is situated on the boundary of Glacier Peak Wilderness, on land managed by Wenatchee National Forest. Its nearest higher neighbor is Emerald Peak, 1.1 mi (1.8 km) to the south-southwest, and Cardinal Peak is positioned 1.76 mi (2.83 km) to the south. Precipitation runoff from the ridge drains into nearby Lake Chelan via Emerald Creek and Bearcat Creek. Bearcat Ridge forms the high divide between these two creek valleys.

== Climate ==
Weather fronts originating in the Pacific Ocean travel northeast toward the Cascade Mountains. As fronts approach the North Cascades, they are forced upward by the peaks of the Cascade Range (orographic lift), causing them to drop their moisture in the form of rain or snowfall onto the Cascades. As a result, the North Cascades experiences high precipitation, especially during the winter months in the form of snowfall. During winter months, weather is usually cloudy, but due to high pressure systems over the Pacific Ocean that intensify during summer months, there is often little or no cloud cover during the summer.

== Geology ==
Bearcat Ridge is composed primarily of granodiorite and hornblende quartz diorite, minerals of the Cardinal Peak pluton. The North Cascades feature some of the most rugged topography in the Cascade Range with craggy peaks, spires, ridges, and deep glacial valleys. Geological events occurring many years ago created the diverse topography and drastic elevation changes over the Cascade Range leading to the various climate differences. The history of the formation of the Cascade Mountains dates back millions of years ago to the late Eocene Epoch. With the North American Plate overriding the Pacific Plate, episodes of volcanic igneous activity persisted. Glacier Peak, a stratovolcano that is 23 mi (37 km) west of Bearcat Ridge, began forming in the mid-Pleistocene. In addition, small fragments of the oceanic and continental lithosphere called terranes created the North Cascades about 50 million years ago. During the Pleistocene period dating back over two million years ago, glaciation advancing and retreating repeatedly scoured the landscape leaving deposits of rock debris. The U-shaped cross section of the river valleys is a result of recent glaciation. Uplift and faulting in combination with glaciation have been the dominant processes which have created the tall peaks and deep valleys of the North Cascades area.

== Gallery ==
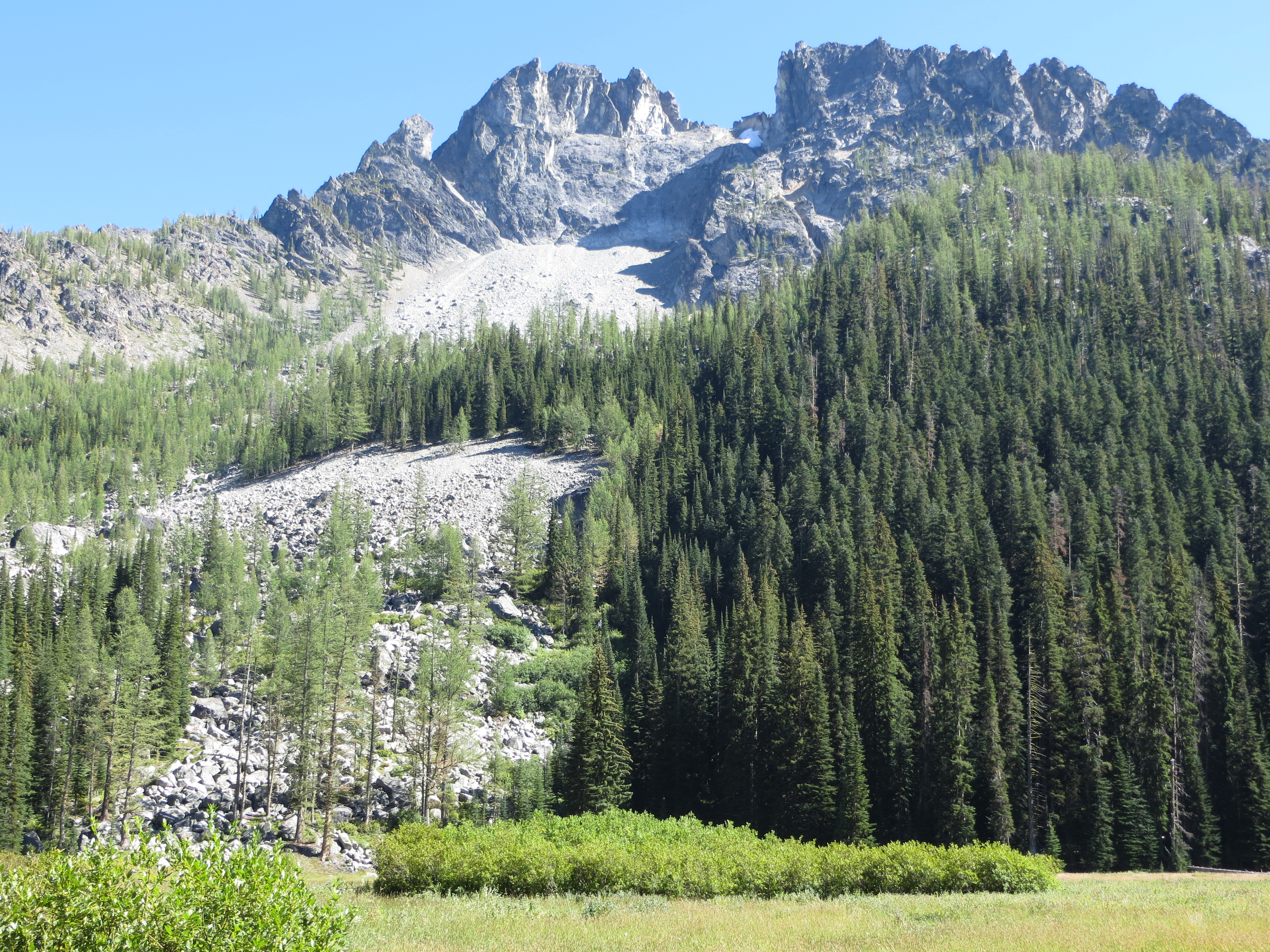
Bearcat Ridge from Emerald Park

== See also ==
- Geography of the North Cascades
- List of Highest Mountain Peaks in Washington
