= Fifth of July Mountain =

Mountain in Washington (state), United States

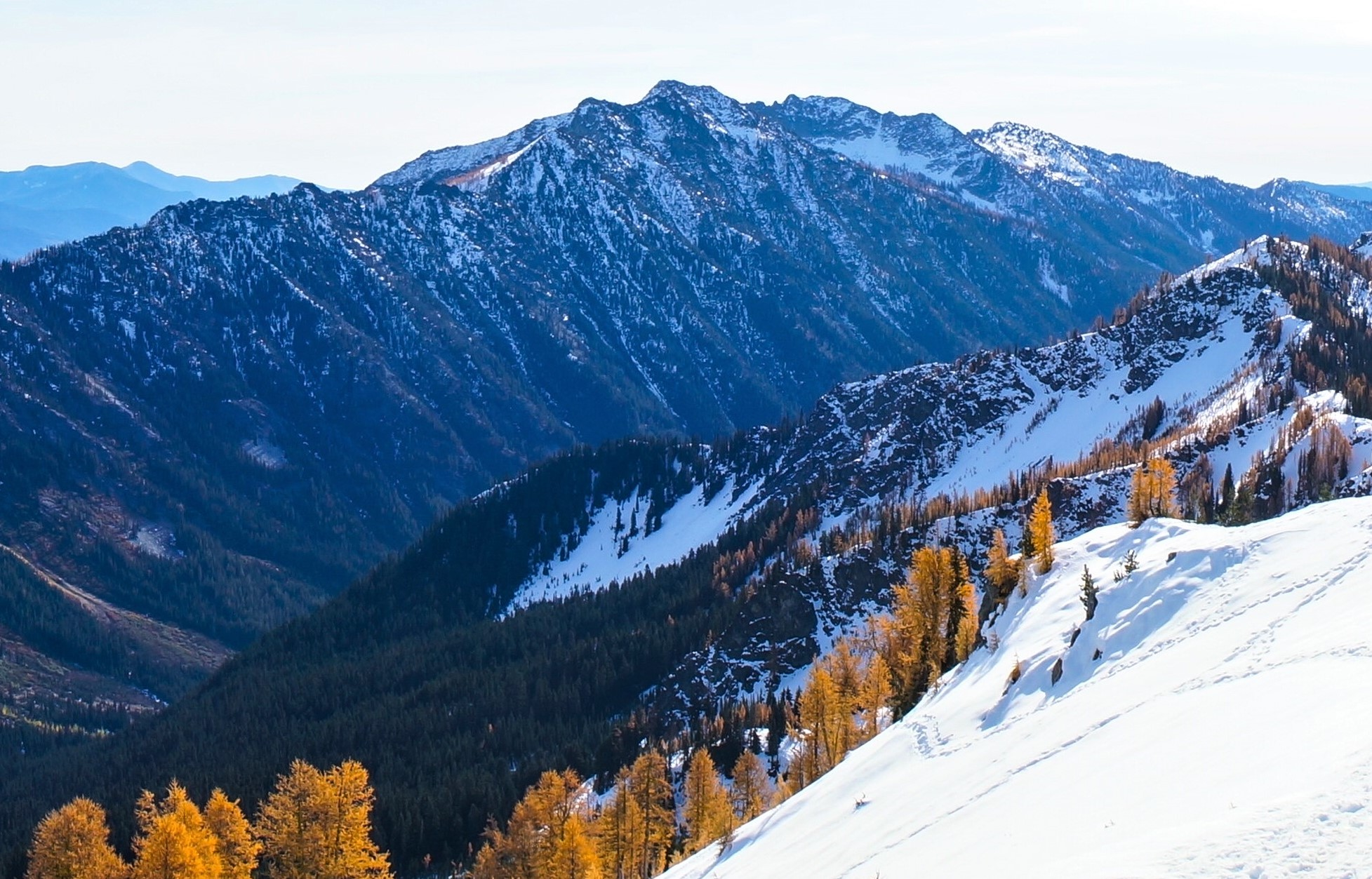
- Northwest aspect, from Carne Mountain

Highest point
- Elevation: 7,696 ft (2,346 m)
- Prominence: 1,256 ft (383 m)
- Parent peak: Chilly Peak (7,960 ft)
- Isolation: 3.81 mi (6.13 km)
- Coordinates: 48°02′54″N 120°44′30″W

Geography
- Location within Washington (state) Location within the United States
- Interactive map of Fifth of July Mountain
- Country: United States
- State: Washington
- County: Chelan
- Protected area: Glacier Peak Wilderness
- Parent range: Entiat Mountains; North Cascades; Cascade Range
- Topo map: USGS Saska Peak

Climbing
- Easiest route: class 2 hiking

Fifth of July Mountain is a 7,696 ft (2,350 m) mountain summit located in the Entiat Mountains, a sub-range of the North Cascades, in Chelan County of Washington state. Fifth of July Mountain is situated in the Glacier Peak Wilderness, on land managed by the Okanogan–Wenatchee National Forest. Its nearest higher neighbor is Chilly Peak, 3.8 miles (6.1 km) to the north-northwest, and Carne Mountain is set 4 miles (6.4 km) to the northwest. Precipitation runoff from the mountain drains west into Rock Creek which is a tributary of the Chiwawa River, or east into Cow Creek, a tributary of the Entiat River. This geographical feature was named by surveyor Albert Hale Sylvester for the day he visited it.

== Climate ==
Lying east of the Cascade crest, the area around Fifth of July Mountain is a bit drier than areas to the west. Summers can bring warm temperatures and occasional thunderstorms. Weather fronts originating in the Pacific Ocean travel northeast toward the Cascade Mountains. As fronts approach the North Cascades, they are forced upward by the peaks of the Cascade Range, causing them to drop their moisture in the form of rain or snowfall onto the Cascades (Orographic lift). As a result, the North Cascades experiences high precipitation, especially during the winter months in the form of snowfall. With its impressive height, Fifth of July Mountain can have snow on it in late-spring and early-fall, and can be very cold in the winter.

== Geology ==
The North Cascades features some of the most rugged topography in the Cascade Range with craggy peaks, ridges, and deep glacial valleys. Geological events occurring many years ago created the diverse topography and drastic elevation changes over the Cascade Range leading to various climate differences. These climate differences lead to vegetation variety defining the ecoregions in this area.

The history of the formation of the Cascade Mountains dates back millions of years ago to the late Eocene Epoch. With the North American Plate overriding the Pacific Plate, episodes of volcanic igneous activity persisted. Glacier Peak, a stratovolcano that is 17.8 mi (28.6 km) west-northwest of Fifth of July Mountain, began forming in the mid-Pleistocene.

During the Pleistocene period dating back over two million years ago, glaciation advancing and retreating repeatedly scoured the landscape leaving deposits of rock debris. The U-shaped cross section of the river valleys is a result of recent glaciation. Uplift and faulting in combination with glaciation have been the dominant processes which have created the tall peaks and deep valleys of the North Cascades area.

== See also ==
- Geography of Washington (state)
- Geology of the Pacific Northwest
