= Chilly Peak =

Mountain in Washington (state), United States

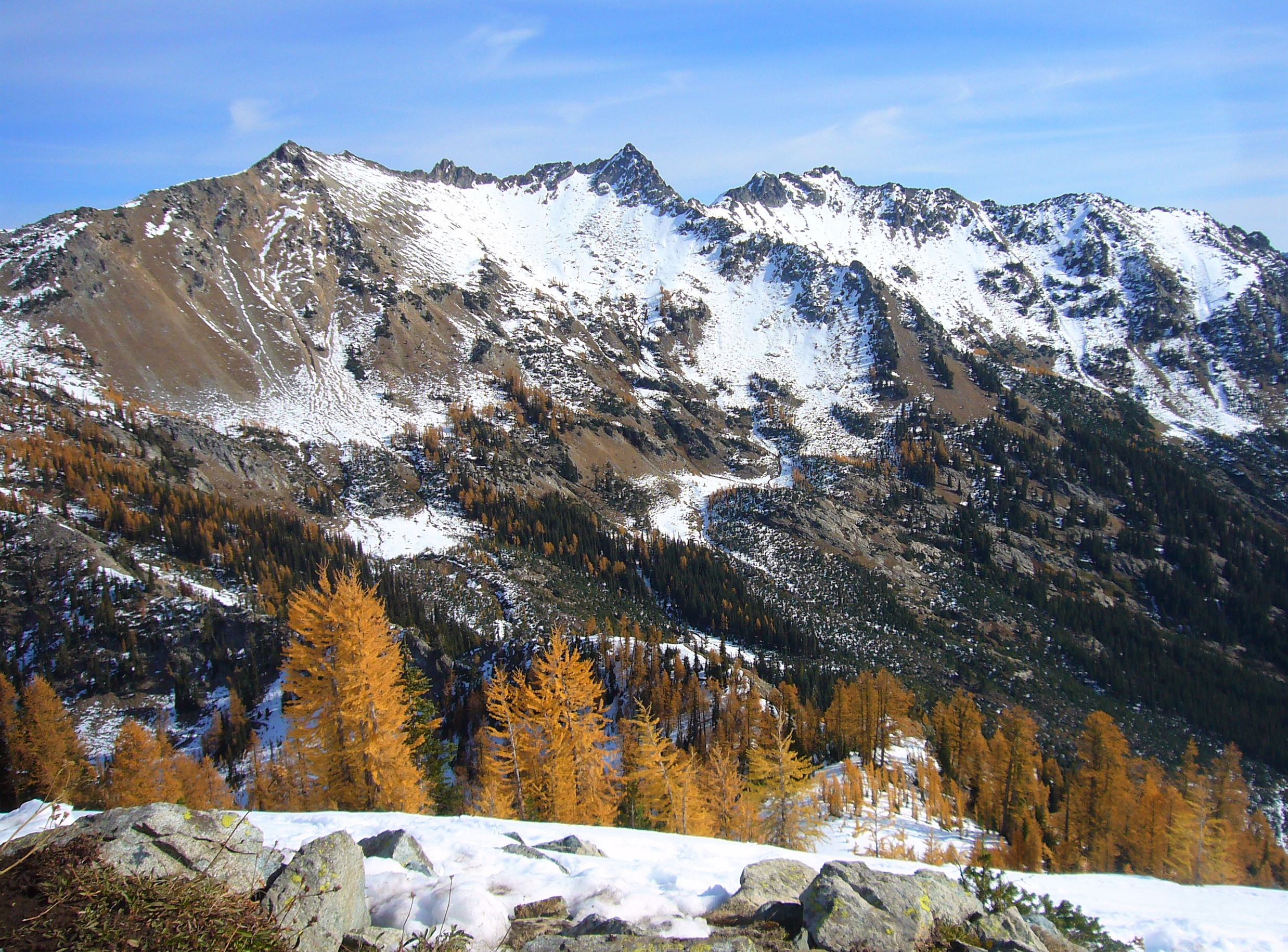
- Chilly Peak, west aspect, from Carne Mountain

Highest point
- Elevation: 7,970 ft (2,429 m)
- Prominence: 504 ft (154 m)
- Parent peak: Ice Box
- Isolation: 1.29 mi (2.08 km)
- Coordinates: 48°05′53″N 120°46′37″W

Geography
- Location within Washington (state) Location within the United States
- Interactive map of Chilly Peak
- Country: United States
- State: Washington
- County: Chelan
- Protected area: Glacier Peak Wilderness
- Parent range: Entiat Mountains; North Cascades
- Topo map: USGS Trinity

Climbing
- Easiest route: class 3-4 scrambling

Chilly Peak is a 7,970-foot (2,429-metre) mountain summit located in the Entiat Mountains, a sub-range of the North Cascades, in Chelan County of Washington state. It ranks as 194th of Washington's highest 200 peaks. The nearest higher neighbor is Ice Box, 1.3 miles (2.1 km) to the northwest, and Spectacle Buttes are set 2.1 miles (3.4 km) to the north-northeast. Chilly Peak is situated 2.5 miles (4.0 km) south of Ice Lakes in the Okanogan–Wenatchee National Forest. Precipitation runoff from the mountain drains east into Ice Creek which is a tributary of the Entiat River, and west into Rock Creek, a tributary of the Chiwawa River.

== Climate ==
Lying east of the Cascade crest, the area around Chilly Peak is a bit drier than areas to the west. Summers can bring warm temperatures and occasional thunderstorms. Weather fronts originating in the Pacific Ocean travel northeast toward the Cascade Mountains. As fronts approach the North Cascades, they are forced upward by the peaks (orographic lift), causing them to drop their moisture in the form of rain or snowfall onto the Cascades. As a result, the North Cascades experiences high precipitation, especially during the winter months in the form of snowfall. With its impressive height, Chilly Peak can have snow on it in late-spring and early-fall, and it can be very cold in the winter.

== Geology ==
The North Cascades features some of the most rugged topography in the Cascade Range with craggy peaks, ridges, and deep glacial valleys. Geological events occurring many years ago created the diverse topography and drastic elevation changes over the Cascade Range leading to the various climate differences. These climate differences lead to vegetation variety defining the ecoregions in this area.

The history of the formation of the Cascade Mountains dates back millions of years ago to the late Eocene Epoch. With the North American Plate overriding the Pacific Plate, episodes of volcanic igneous activity persisted. Glacier Peak, a stratovolcano that is 15.6 mi (25.1 km) west of Chilly Peak, began forming in the mid-Pleistocene.

During the Pleistocene period dating back over two million years ago, glaciation advancing and retreating repeatedly scoured the landscape leaving deposits of rock debris. The U-shaped cross section of the river valleys is a result of recent glaciation. Uplift and faulting in combination with glaciation have been the dominant processes which have created the tall peaks and deep valleys of the North Cascades area.

== See also ==
- Geography of Washington (state)
- Geology of the Pacific Northwest
