= Ice Box =

An icebox is a compact non-mechanical refrigerator which was a common kitchen appliance before the development of safe powered refrigeration devices.

Ice Box may also refer to:

== Structures ==
- Ice Box (arena), an arena in Lincoln, Nebraska
- Ice house (building), a building used to store ice throughout the year before refrigeration

== Music ==
- "Ice Box" (song), a song by Omarion
- “Icebox”, a song by Kevin Gates from the 2019 album I'm Him

== Other uses ==
- Ice Box (horse), an American Thoroughbred racehorse
- Ice Box (magazine), a literary magazine produced by the University of Alaska Fairbanks
- Ice Box (Washington), a mountain in Washington state
- Icebox Animation, an internet company
- The Icebox, a character from the 1994 comedy Little Giants
- ICE box (initial, change, equilibrium), used in chemistry to track concentrations in equilibrium reactions.

== See also ==
- Refrigerator
- Cooler, a mechanical refrigerator
