= Myrtle Lake (Chelan County, Washington) =

Lake in Chelan County, Washington, United States

- Location within Washington (state) Location within the United States
- Location: Chelan County, Washington, United States
- Coordinates: 48.055473°N 120.70334°W
- Basin countries: United States
- Surface area: 14.4 acres (0.058 km^{2})
- Surface elevation: 3,766 ft (1,148 m)

Myrtle Lake is a freshwater lake located on the northern slope of Rampart Mountain East of Cow Creek Meadows, in Chelan County, Washington. The lake is a popular area for hiking, swimming, and fishing brook trout.

== Location ==
Myrtle lake is located along the western shore of Entiat River and on the eastern slope of a steep hill that leads to Cow Creek Meadows above 5000 feet. The meadows are bordered from north to south by the Entiat Mountains: Devils Smoke Stack (7,630 feet (2,330 m)), Rampart Mountain (7,700 feet (2,300 m)) and Fourth of July Mountain (7,692 feet (2,345 m)). To the west, Myrtle lake is bordered by the Chelan Mountains.

== Access ==
Access to Myrtle Lake is through Cow Creek Trail #1404 which starts at the Entiat River Trailhead across the Cottonwood Guard Station along Forest Service Road 5100. The trail borders Entiat River.

== Wolverine Fire (2015) ==
Drought conditions throughout the state of Washington resulted in many devastating wildfires throughout Washington in 2015. On June 29, 2015, lightning sparked a fire in Wolverine Creek, which expanded and became part of the Chelan Complex fire. This affected the Entiat River Valley and the area that surrounds Myrtle lake. The fire left the trail closed for two years resulting in a more exposed trail towards the lake.
