= Saska Peak =

Mountain in Washington (state), United States

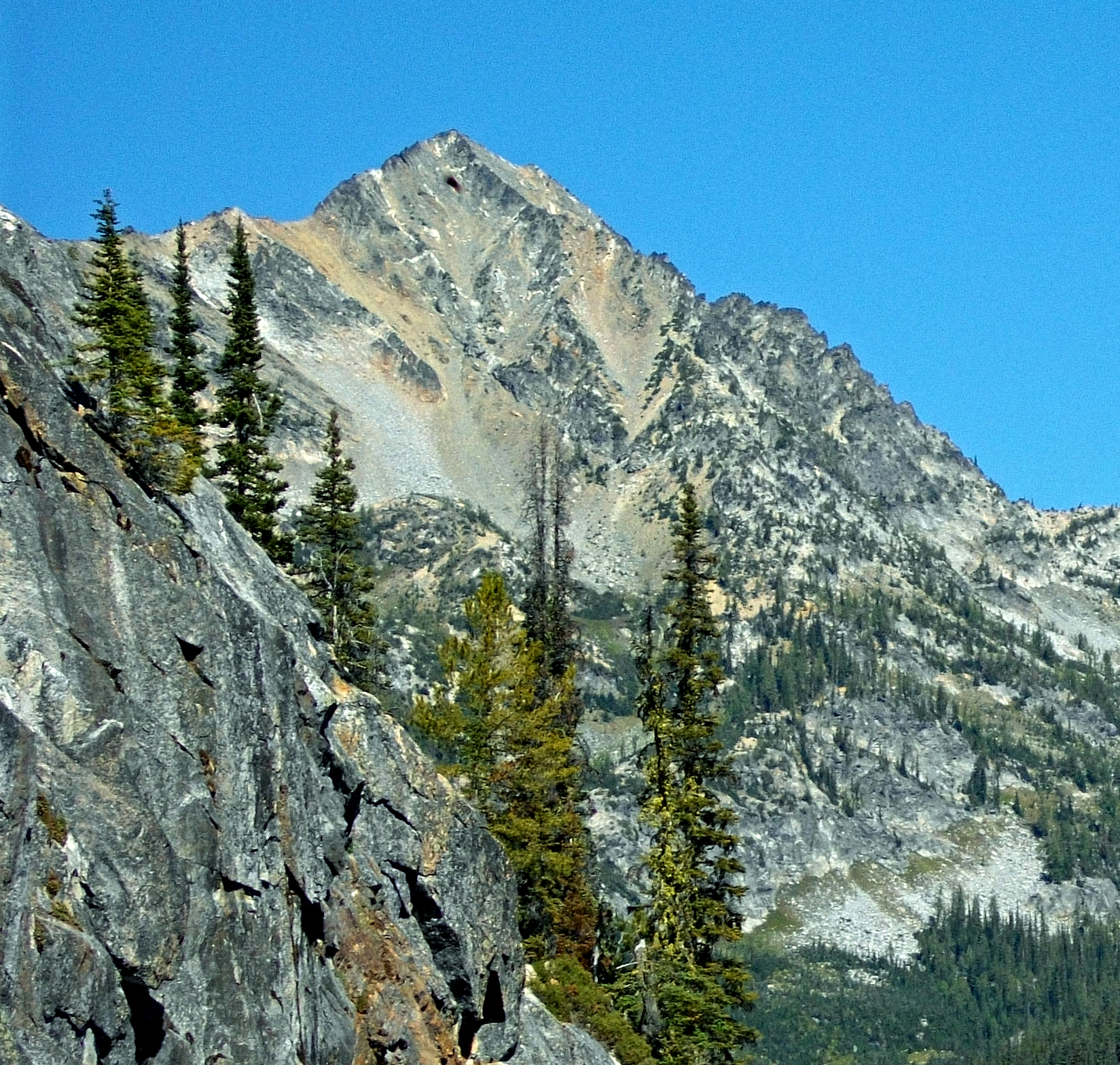
- Saska Peak, south aspect

Highest point
- Elevation: 8,404 ft (2,562 m)
- Prominence: 644 ft (196 m)
- Parent peak: Emerald Peak 8,422 ft
- Isolation: 0.65 mi (1.05 km)
- Coordinates: 48°06′44″N 120°38′33″W

Geography
- Location within Washington (state) Location within the United States
- Interactive map of Saska Peak
- Location: Chelan County; Washington, U.S.
- Parent range: Chelan Mountains; North Cascades; Cascade Range
- Topo map: USGS Saska Peak

Geology
- Rock type(s): hornblende quartz diorite, granodiorite

Climbing
- Easiest route: class 3 scrambling South ridge

Saska Peak is an 8,404 ft (2,560 m) mountain summit located in the Chelan Mountains, in Chelan County of Washington state. The mountain is situated in Glacier Peak Wilderness of the North Cascades, on land managed by Wenatchee National Forest. Saska Peak ranks as the third-highest peak in the Chelan Mountains, and 74th-highest summit in Washington state. Its nearest higher neighbor is Emerald Peak, 0.66 mi (1.06 km) to the east-northeast, and Cardinal Peak is positioned 1.52 mi (2.45 km) to the east-southeast. These three highest peaks of the Chelan Mountains enclose the head of North Fork Entiat River valley. Precipitation runoff from the peak drains into the Entiat River drainage basin. The mountain's name honors Shil-how-Saskt (Silico Saska), Tribal chief of the Entiat people, and was applied by Albert Hale Sylvester (1871-1944), a pioneer surveyor, topographer, and forest supervisor who named thousands of geographic features in the Cascades. In the Columbia-Moses language (Salishan), this name means "Standing in the middle of the sky."

== Climate ==
Most weather fronts originate in the Pacific Ocean, and travel northeast toward the Cascade Mountains. As fronts approach the North Cascades, they are forced upward by the peaks of the Cascade Range, causing them to drop their moisture in the form of rain or snowfall onto the Cascades (Orographic lift). As a result, the North Cascades experience high precipitation, especially during the winter months in the form of snowfall. During winter months, weather is usually cloudy, but, due to high pressure systems over the Pacific Ocean that intensify during summer months, there is often little or no cloud cover during the summer.

== Geology ==
Saska Peak is composed primarily of granodiorite and hornblende quartz diorite, minerals of the Cardinal Peak pluton.

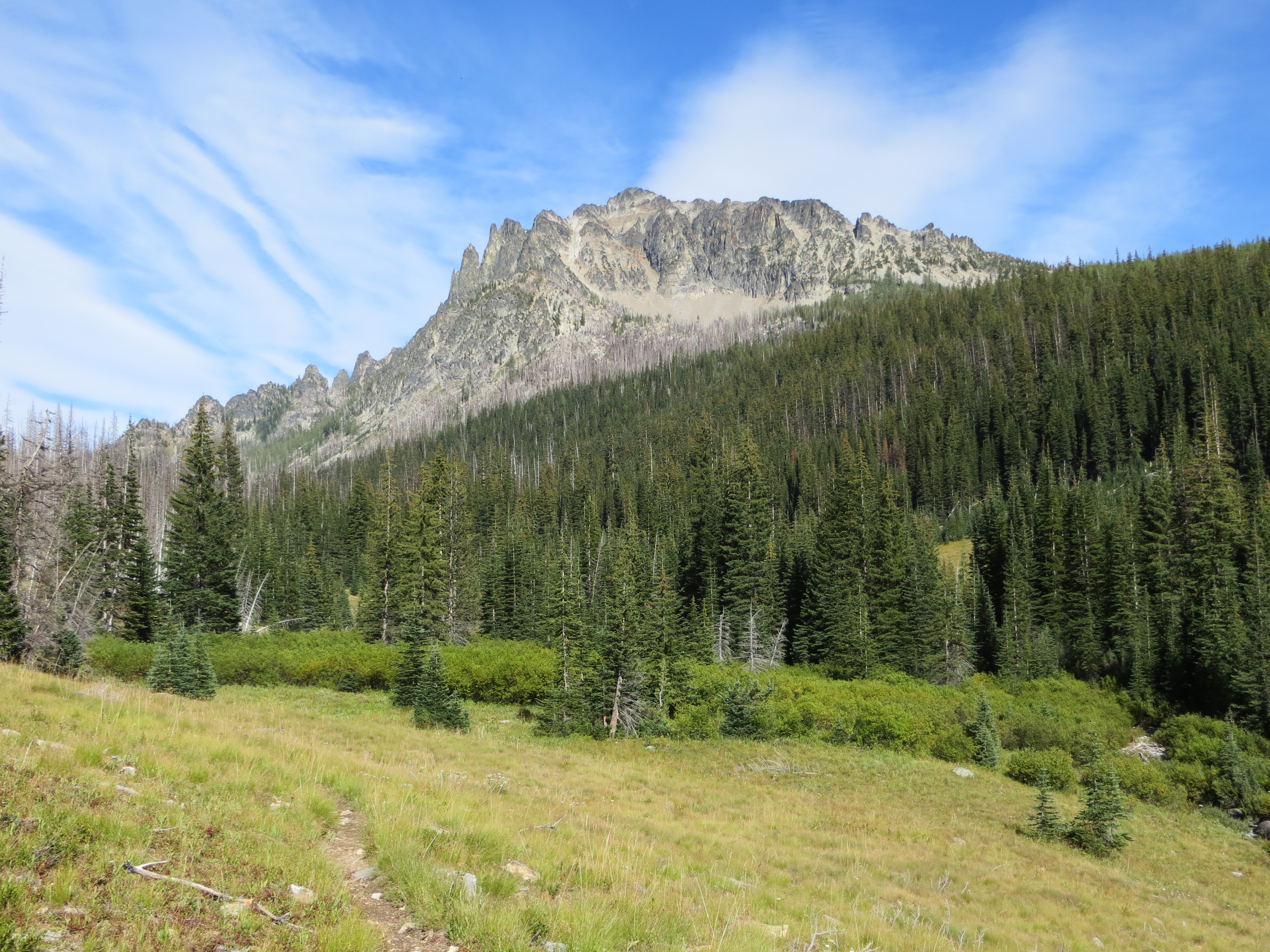
Saska Peak, southwest aspect

The North Cascades feature some of the most rugged topography in the Cascade Range with craggy peaks, spires, ridges, and deep glacial valleys. Geological events occurring many years ago created the diverse topography and drastic elevation changes over the Cascade Range leading to the various climate differences. The history of the formation of the Cascade Mountains dates back millions of years ago to the late Eocene Epoch. With the North American Plate overriding the Pacific Plate, episodes of volcanic igneous activity persisted. Glacier Peak, a stratovolcano that is 21.8 mi (35.1 km) west of Saska Peak, began forming in the mid-Pleistocene. In addition, small fragments of the oceanic and continental lithosphere called terranes created the North Cascades about 50 million years ago. During the Pleistocene period dating back over two million years ago, glaciation advancing and retreating repeatedly scoured the landscape leaving deposits of rock debris. The U-shaped cross section of the river valleys is a result of recent glaciation. Uplift and faulting in combination with glaciation have been the dominant processes which have created the tall peaks and deep valleys of the North Cascades area.

== Gallery ==
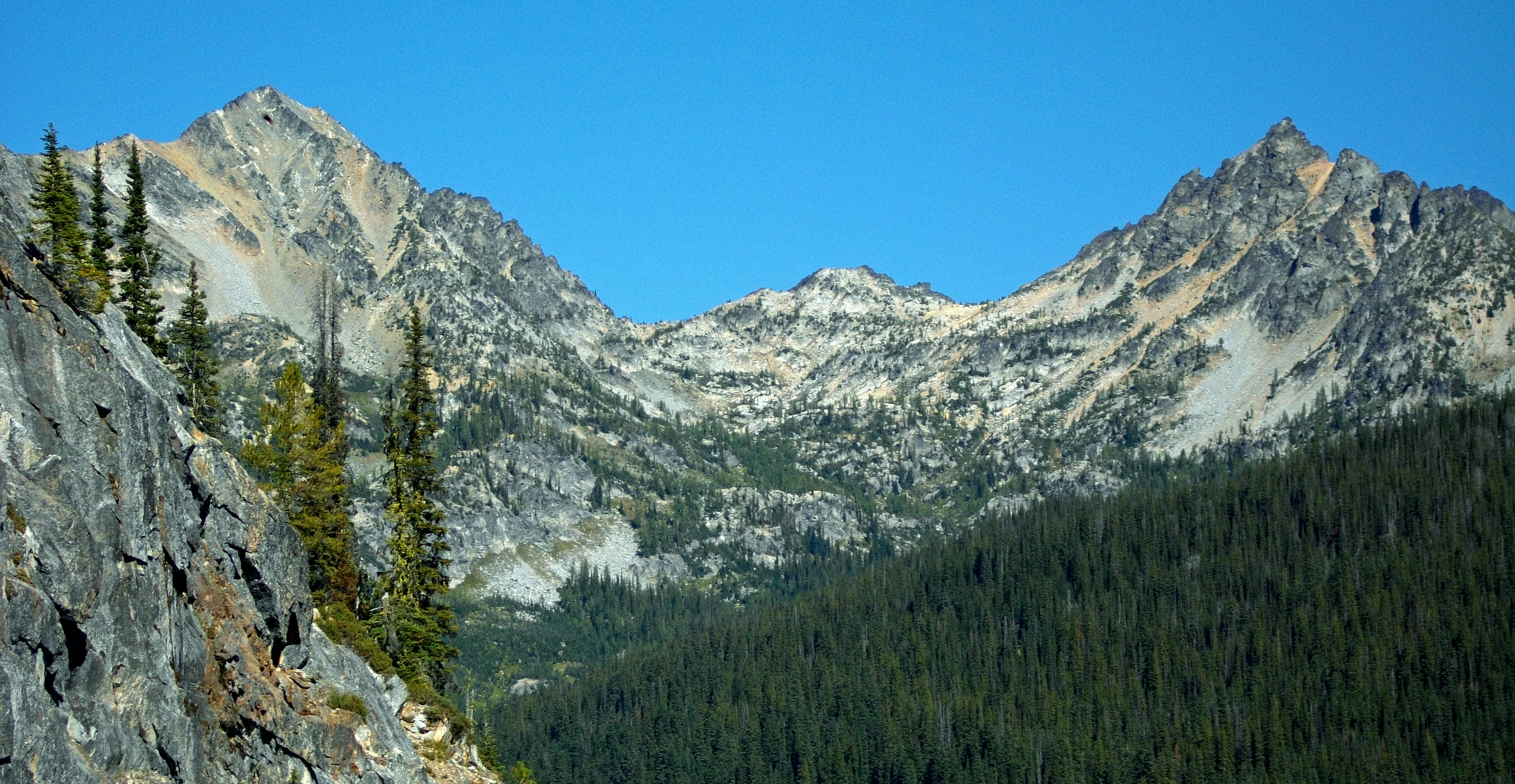
Saska Peak (left) and Emerald Peak (right), from the south

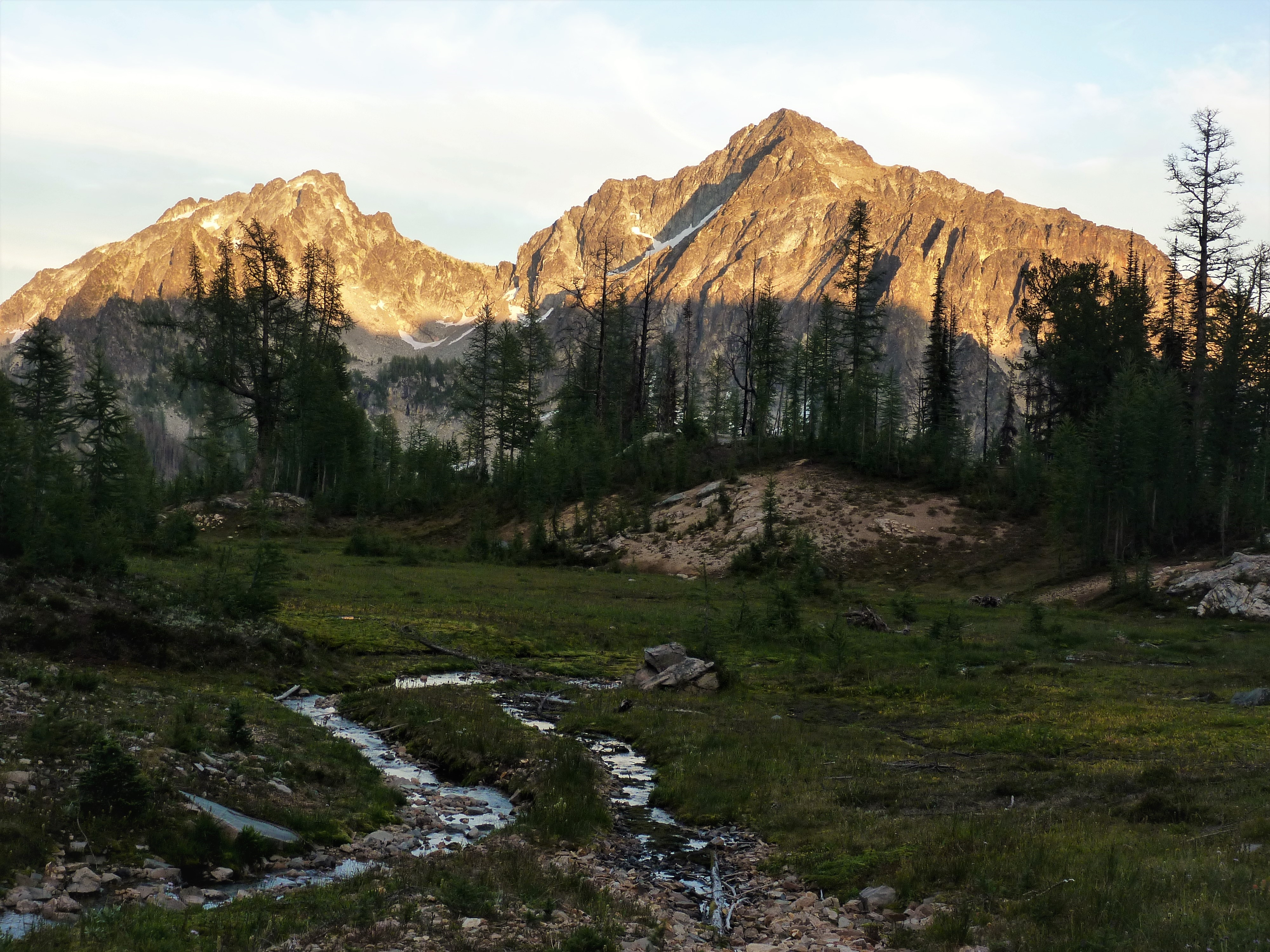
West-northwest aspect, with Emerald Peak to left

== See also ==
- Geography of the North Cascades
- List of Highest Mountain Peaks in Washington
