= Emerald Peak (Washington) =

Mountain in Washington (state), United States

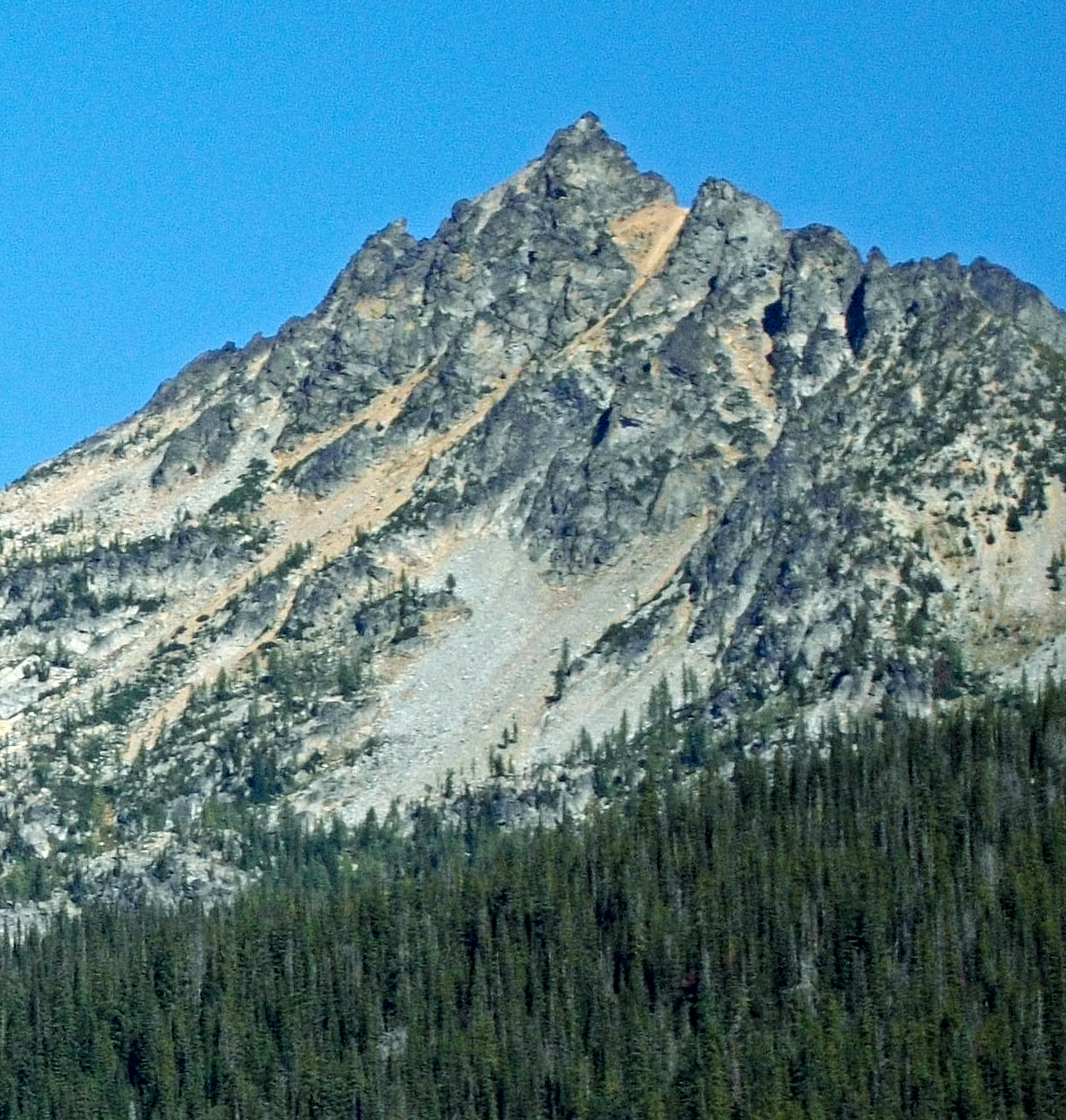
- Emerald Peak, south aspect

Highest point
- Elevation: 8,422 ft (2,567 m)
- Prominence: 742 ft (226 m)
- Parent peak: Cardinal Peak 8,595 ft
- Isolation: 1.13 mi (1.82 km)
- Coordinates: 48°06′55″N 120°37′44″W

Geography
- Location within Washington (state) Location within the United States
- Interactive map of Emerald Peak
- Country: United States
- State: Washington
- County: Chelan
- Protected area: Glacier Peak Wilderness
- Parent range: Chelan Mountains; North Cascades; Cascade Range
- Topo map: USGS Saska Peak

Geology
- Rock type(s): hornblende quartz diorite, granodiorite

Climbing
- First ascent: 1937, William A. Long
- Easiest route: class 2-3 scrambling

Emerald Peak is an 8,422-foot-elevation (2,567-meter) mountain summit located in the Chelan Mountains, in Chelan County of Washington state.

== Description ==
The mountain is situated in the Glacier Peak Wilderness of the North Cascades, on land managed by Wenatchee National Forest. The nearest higher neighbor is Cardinal Peak, 1.1 mi (1.8 km) to the southeast, and Saska Peak which is positioned 0.66 mi (1.06 km) to the west-southwest. These three highest peaks of the Chelan Mountains enclose the head of North Fork Entiat River valley. Bearcat Ridge radiates from Emerald Peak one mile to the northeast. Precipitation runoff from the peak drains into the Chelan River and Entiat River drainage basins. The first ascent of this peak was made in 1937 by William A. Long. Emerald Peak ranks as the second-highest peak in the Chelan Mountains, and 70th-highest summit in Washington state.

== Climate ==
Most weather fronts originate in the Pacific Ocean, and travel northeast toward the Cascade Mountains. As fronts approach the North Cascades, they are forced upward by the peaks of the Cascade Range, causing them to drop their moisture in the form of rain or snowfall onto the Cascades (Orographic lift). As a result, the North Cascades experiences high precipitation, especially during the winter months in the form of snowfall. During winter months, weather is usually cloudy, but, due to high pressure systems over the Pacific Ocean that intensify during summer months, there is often little or no cloud cover during the summer.

== Geology ==
Emerald Peak is composed primarily of granodiorite and hornblende quartz diorite, minerals of the Cardinal Peak pluton. The North Cascades feature some of the most rugged topography in the Cascade Range with craggy peaks, spires, ridges, and deep glacial valleys. Geological events occurring many years ago created the diverse topography and drastic elevation changes over the Cascade Range leading to the various climate differences. The history of the formation of the Cascade Mountains dates back millions of years ago to the late Eocene Epoch. With the North American Plate overriding the Pacific Plate, episodes of volcanic igneous activity persisted. Glacier Peak, a stratovolcano that is 22.5 mi (36.2 km) west of Emerald Peak, began forming in the mid-Pleistocene. In addition, small fragments of the oceanic and continental lithosphere called terranes created the North Cascades about 50 million years ago. During the Pleistocene period dating back over two million years ago, glaciation advancing and retreating repeatedly scoured the landscape leaving deposits of rock debris. The U-shaped cross section of the river valleys is a result of recent glaciation. Uplift and faulting in combination with glaciation have been the dominant processes which have created the tall peaks and deep valleys of the North Cascades area.

== Gallery ==
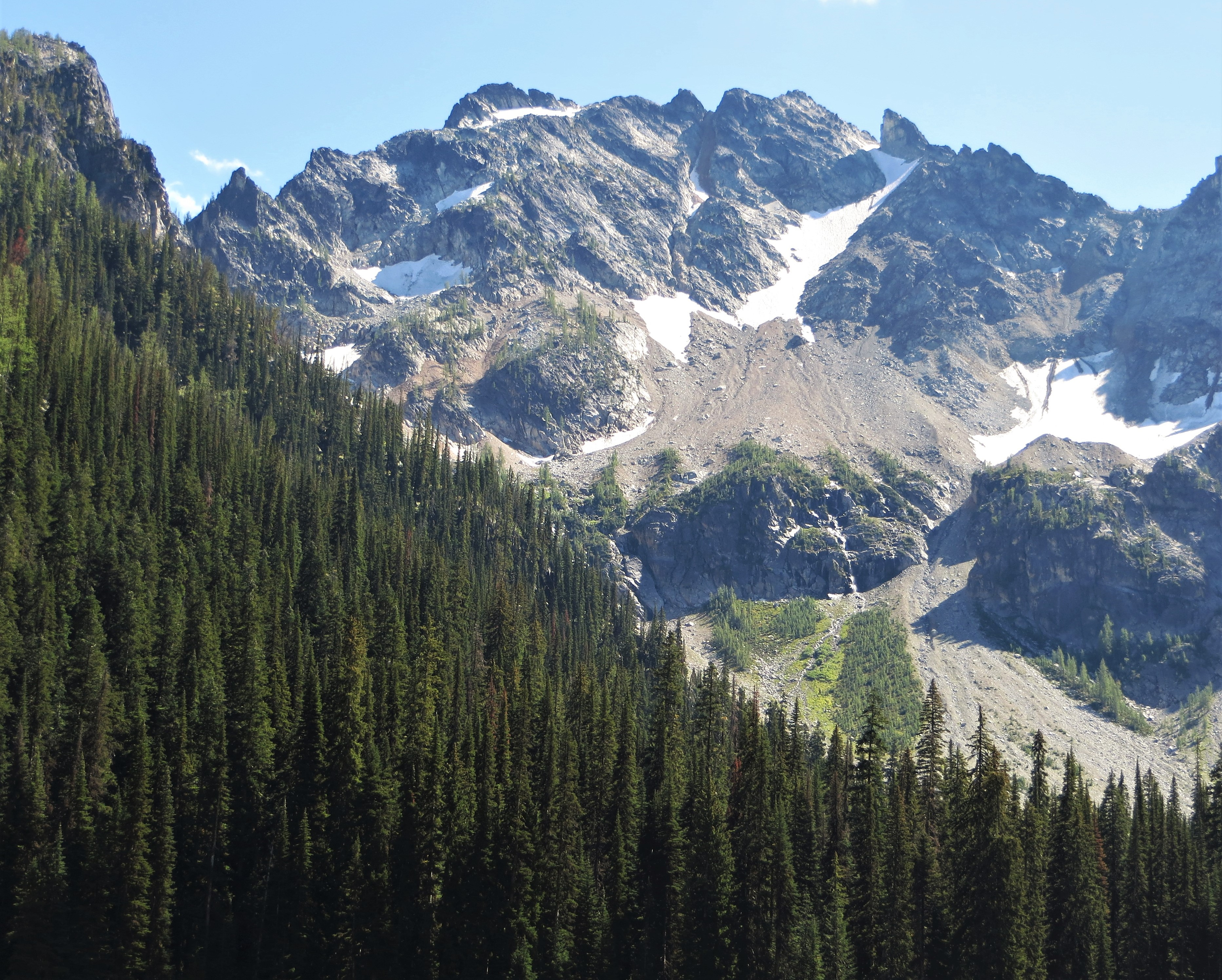
North aspect of Emerald Peak viewed from Emerald Park.

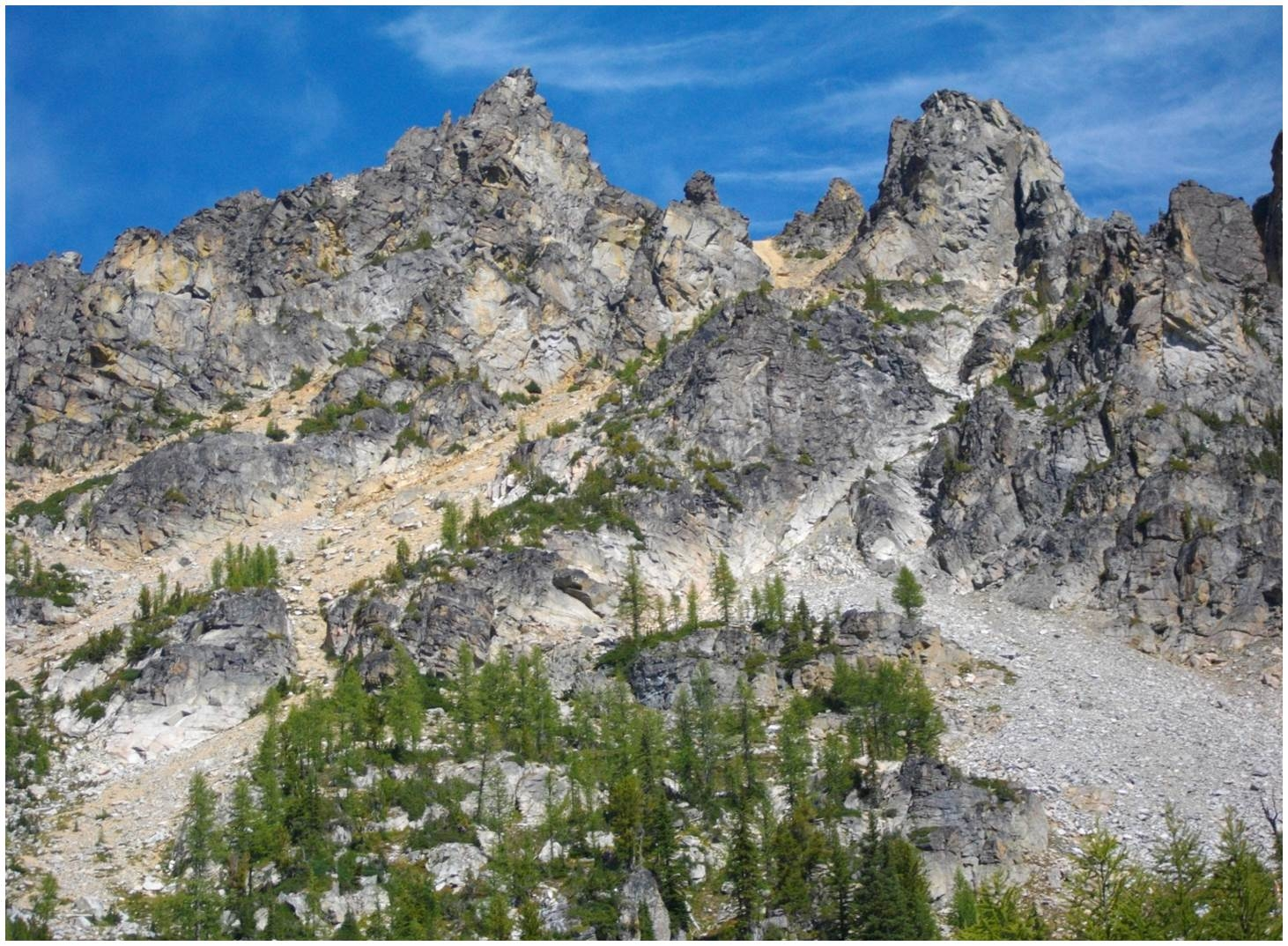
Emerald Peak summit detail

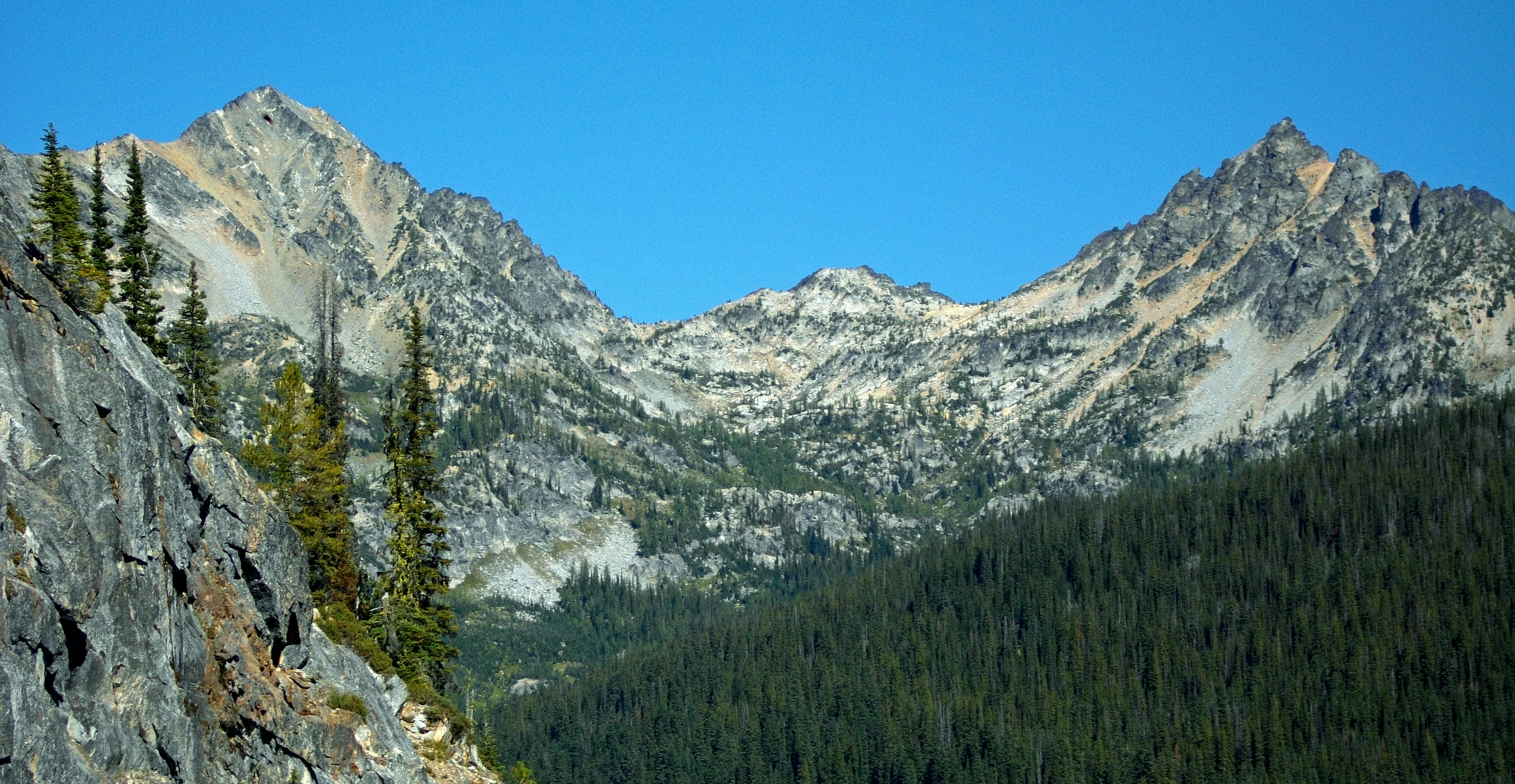
Saska Peak (left) and Emerald Peak (right)

== See also ==
- Geography of the North Cascades
- List of Highest Mountain Peaks in Washington
