= Spectacle Buttes =

Mountains in Washington (state), United States

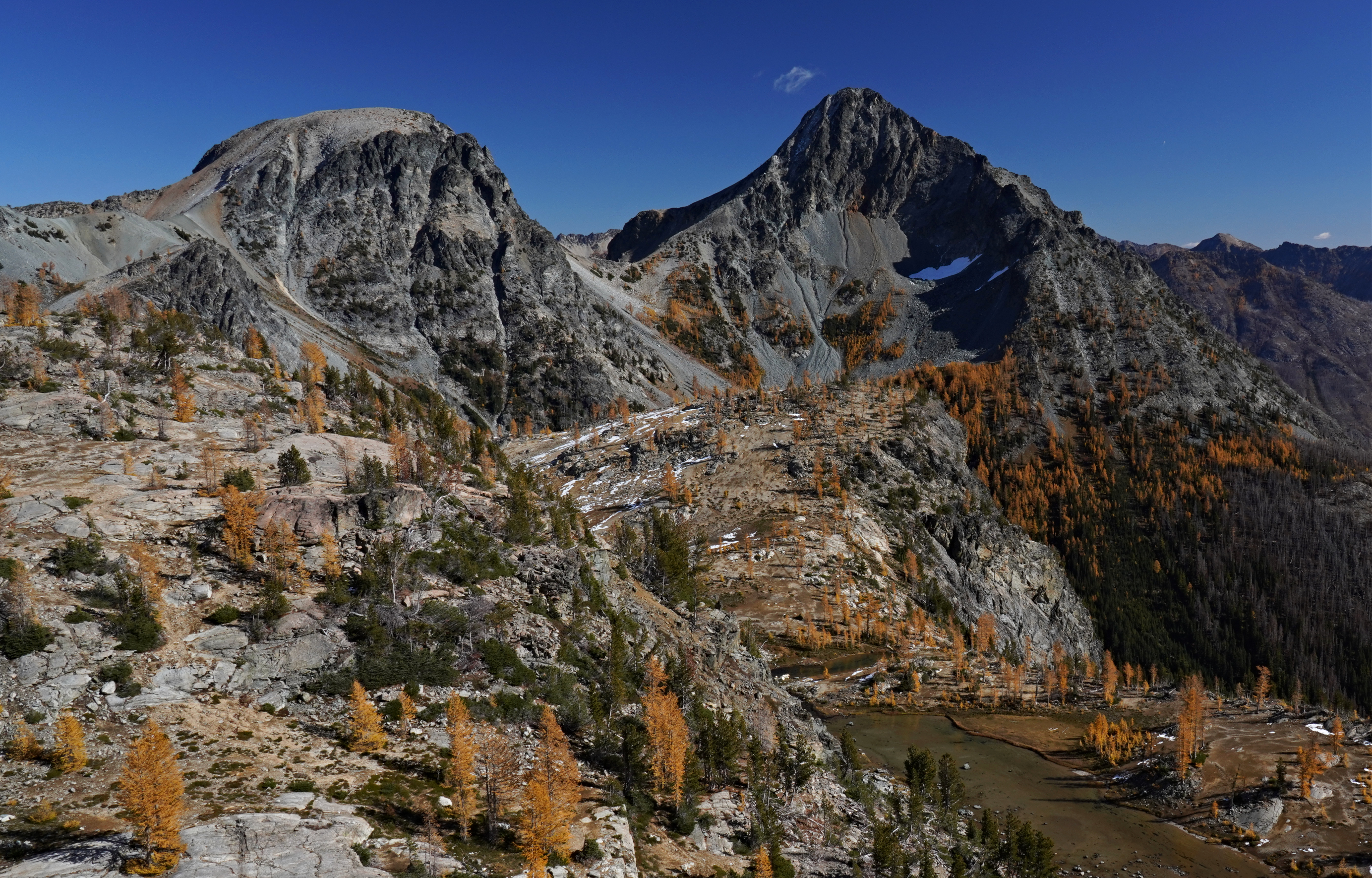
- Spectacle Buttes from west. South butte (right)

Highest point
- Elevation: 8,392 ft (2,558 m)
- Prominence: 1,072 ft (327 m)
- Parent peak: Mount Maude (9040+ ft)
- Isolation: 1.89 mi (3.04 km)
- Coordinates: 48°07′36″N 120°45′36″W

Geography
- Location within Washington (state) Location within the United States
- Interactive map of Spectacle Buttes
- Country: United States
- State: Washington
- County: Chelan
- Protected area: Glacier Peak Wilderness
- Parent range: Entiat Mountains; North Cascades
- Topo map: USGS Holden

Geology
- Rock type: Gneissic

Climbing
- First ascent: 1953
- Easiest route: class 3 Scrambling

Spectacle Buttes are a pair of mountain summits located in the Entiat Mountains, a sub-range of the North Cascades, in Chelan County of Washington state. The pyramid-shaped south summit is 8,392-foot (2,558-metre) in elevation, and the lower north butte is 8,080-foot (2,460-metre) in elevation. Spectacle Buttes are situated 77 miles northeast of Seattle in the Glacier Peak Wilderness, on land managed by the Wenatchee National Forest. Spectacle Buttes ranks 78th on Washington's highest 100 peaks, 81st on the "Bulger List", and seventh-highest in the Entiat Mountains. The nearest higher peak is Marmot Pyramid on Mount Maude, 1.9 miles (3.1 km) to the west-northwest. Precipitation runoff from the peaks drains into headwaters of the Entiat River. The first ascent of the south peak was made by Rowland Tabor and Dwight Crowder on August 20, 1953.

== Climate ==
Lying east of the Cascade crest, the area around Spectacle Buttes is a bit drier than areas to the west. Summers can bring warm temperatures and occasional thunderstorms. Weather fronts originating in the Pacific Ocean travel northeast toward the Cascade Mountains. As fronts approach the North Cascades, they are forced upward by the peaks of the Cascade Range, causing them to drop their moisture in the form of rain or snow onto the Cascades (Orographic lift). As a result, the North Cascades experiences high precipitation, especially during the winter months in the form of snowfall. With its impressive height, Spectacle Buttes can have snow in late-spring and early-fall, and can be very cold in the winter.

== Geology ==
The North Cascades features some of the most rugged topography in the Cascade Range with craggy peaks, ridges, and deep glacial valleys. Geological events occurring many years ago created the diverse topography and drastic elevation changes over the Cascade Range leading to the various climate differences. These climate differences lead to vegetation variety defining the ecoregions in this area.

The history of the formation of the Cascade Mountains dates back millions of years ago to the late Eocene Epoch. With the North American Plate overriding the Pacific Plate, episodes of volcanic igneous activity persisted. In addition, small fragments of the oceanic and continental lithosphere called terranes created the North Cascades about 50 million years ago.

During the Pleistocene period dating back over two million years ago, glaciation advancing and retreating repeatedly scoured the landscape leaving deposits of rock debris. The U-shaped cross section of the river valleys is a result of recent glaciation. Uplift and faulting in combination with glaciation have been the dominant processes which have created the tall peaks and deep valleys of the North Cascades area.

== Gallery ==
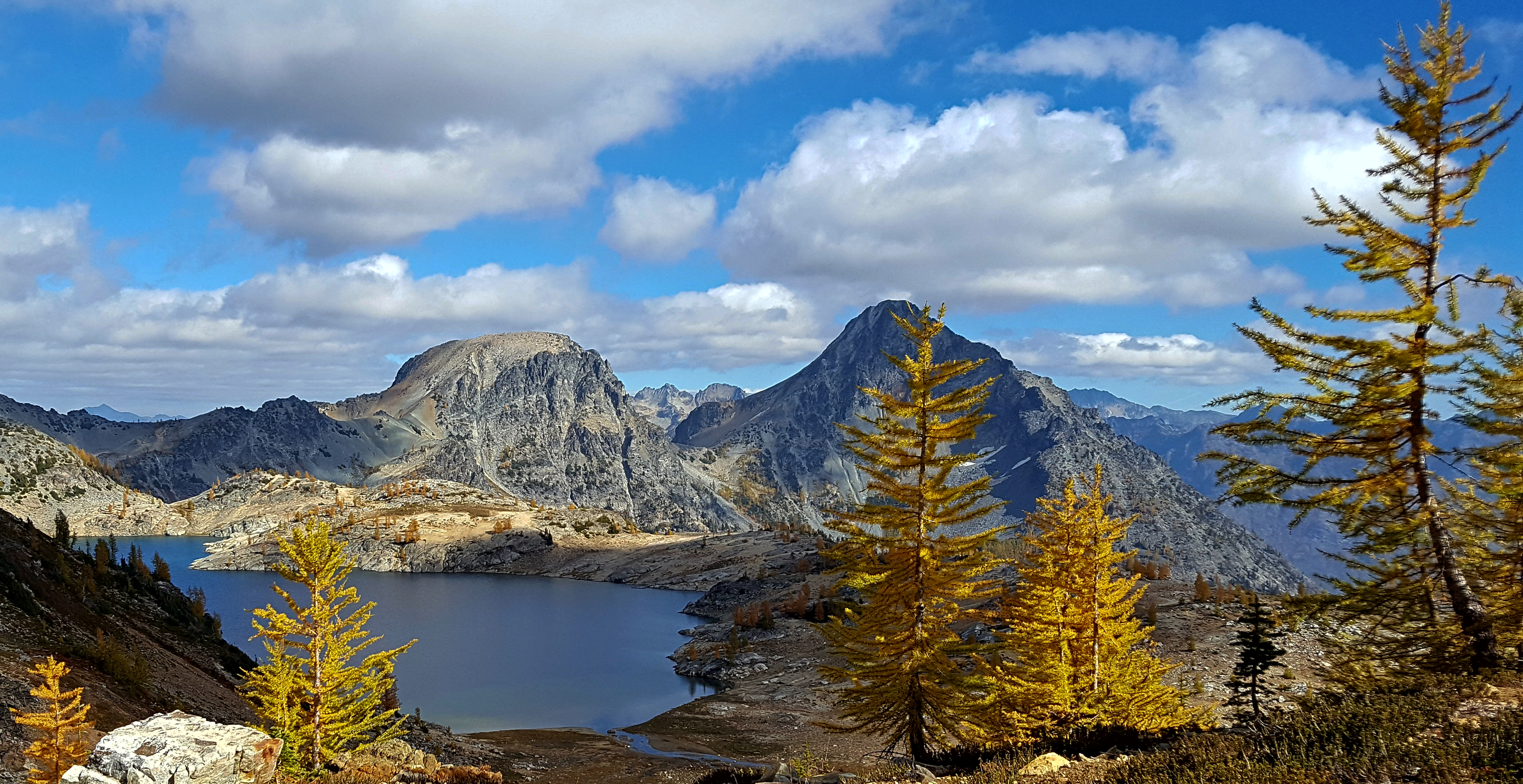
Spectacle Buttes from Ice Lakes

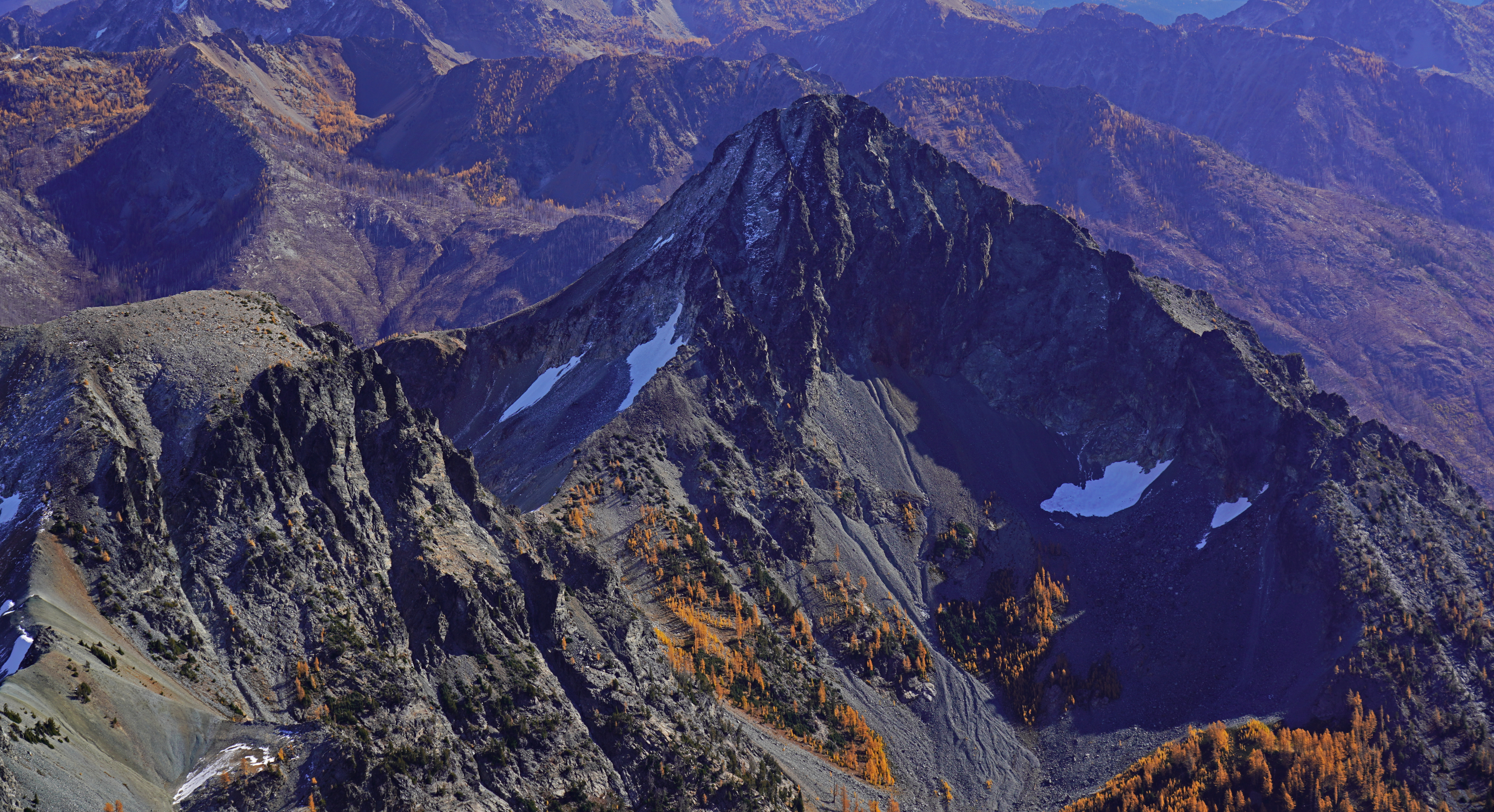
Spectacle Buttes from Mt. Maude

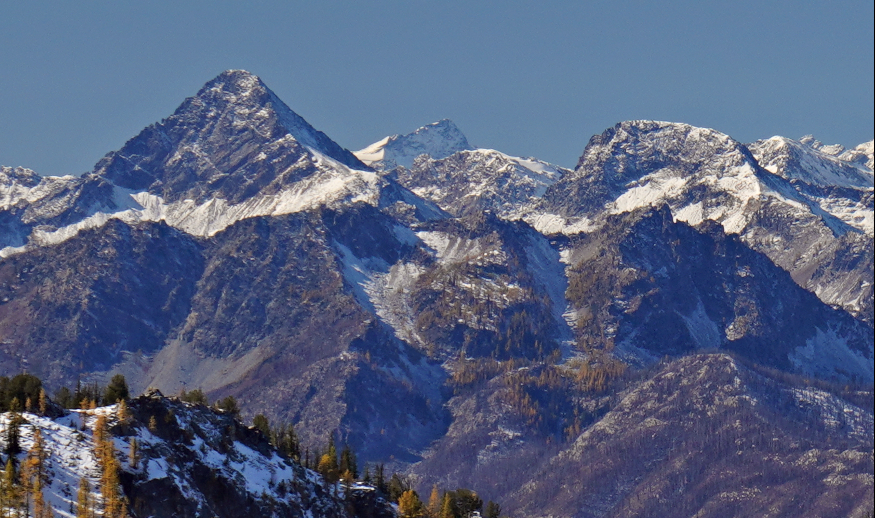
Spectacle Buttes from northeast

== See also ==
- Geography of Washington (state)
- Geology of the Pacific Northwest
- Ice Box
