= Entiat Glacier =

Glacier in Washington, United States

- Location within Washington (state)
- Type: Mountain glacier
- Location: Chelan County, Washington, U.S.
- Coordinates: 48°08′28″N 120°47′49″W
- Length: .35 mi (0.56 km)
- Terminus: Barren rock/icefall
- Status: Retreating

Entiat Glacier is in Wenatchee National Forest in the U.S. state of Washington, on the northeast slopes of Mount Maude. Disconnected at several spots, the Entiat Glacier is in a cirque above the Entiat Valley and is the source of the Entiat River. The southern section of the glacier is the largest.

== See also ==
- List of glaciers in the United States
