= Cardinal Peak =

Mountain in Washington (state), United States

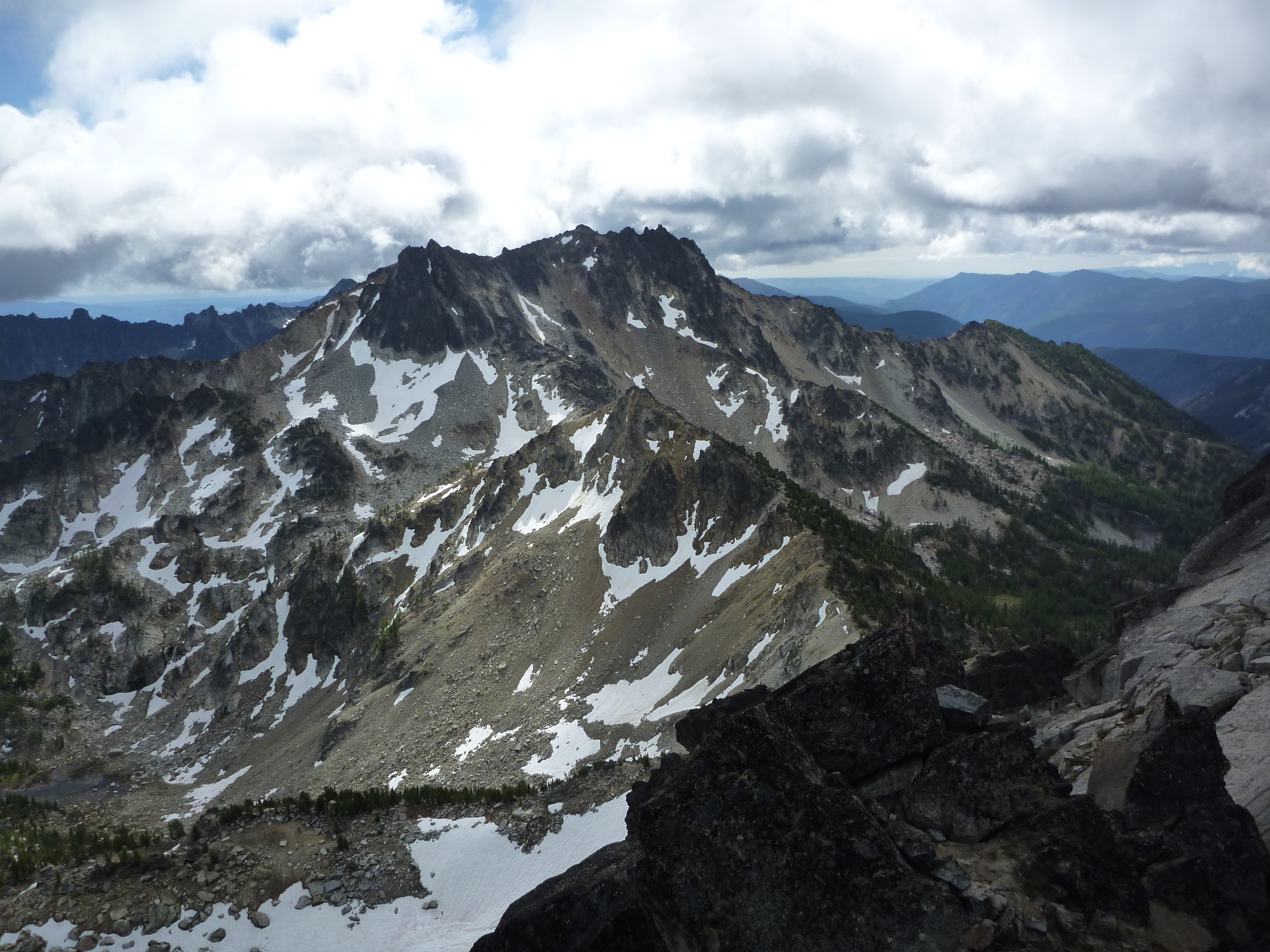
- Cardinal Peak as seen from Emerald Peak

Highest point
- Elevation: 8,595 ft (2,620 m) NAVD 88
- Prominence: 2,070 ft (630 m)
- Coordinates: 48°6′10″N 120°36′45″W

Geography
- Location within Washington (state)
- Location: Chelan County, Washington, United States

Cardinal Peak is the highest peak of the Chelan Mountains, a subrange of the Cascade Range in the U.S. state of Washington. It is located in Wenatchee National Forest at the head of the Entiat River drainage basin, in Chelan County. To the west and north, streams flow into Lake Chelan. Cardinal Peak is less than 5 miles (8.0 km) from the lake and rises 7,500 feet (2,300 m) above the lakeshore. At 8,595 feet (2,620 m) high, it is the 49th highest peak in Washington. Its 2,070-foot (630 m) prominence ranks 132nd in the state.

The rocks of Cardinal Peak are mainly granodiorite and hornblende quartz diorite, minerals of the Cardinal Peak pluton.

== History ==
Cardinal Peak was named by Albert H. Sylvester because it is the highest peak in the region.

== See also ==
- List of mountains of the United States
- List of mountains by elevation
