= Ice Box (Washington) =

Mountain in Washington (state), United States

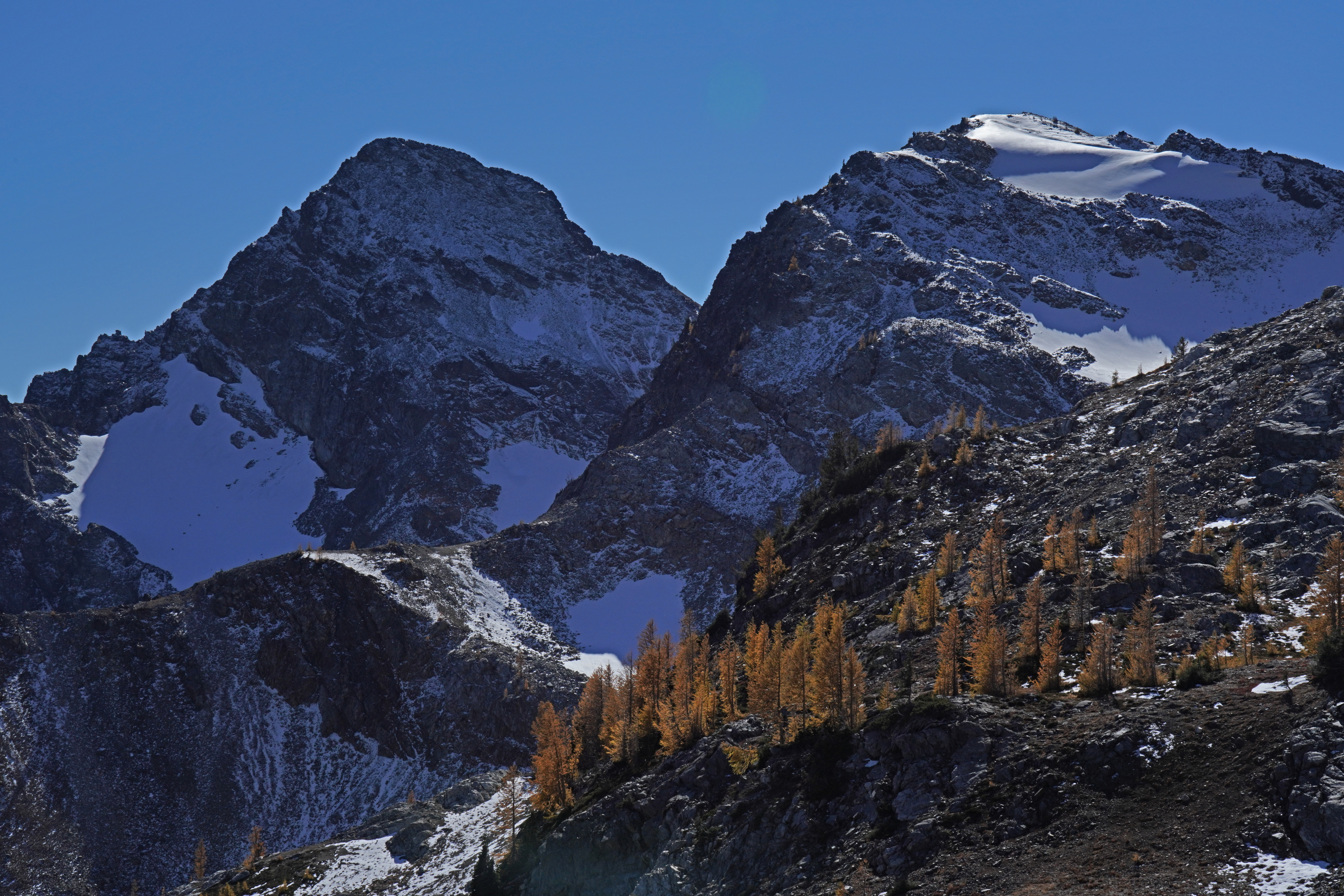
- Ice Box (summit left) from Upper Ice Lake

Highest point
- Elevation: 8,112 ft (2,473 m)
- Prominence: 472 ft (144 m)
- Parent peak: Mount Maude (9040+ ft)
- Isolation: 1.51 mi (2.43 km)
- Coordinates: 48°06′44″N 120°47′44″W

Geography
- Location within Washington (state) Location within the United States
- Interactive map of Ice Box
- Location: Chelan County; Washington, U.S.
- Parent range: Entiat Mountains; North Cascades
- Topo map: USGS Trinity

Climbing
- Easiest route: class 3

Ice Box is an 8,112-foot (2,473-metre) mountain summit located in the Entiat Mountains, a sub-range of the North Cascades, in Chelan County of Washington state. Ice Box ranks as ninth-highest in the Entiat Mountains, and 147th of Washington's highest 200 peaks. Its nearest higher neighbor is Mount Maude, 1.8 miles (2.9 km) to the north, Spectacle Buttes are set 1.9 miles (3.1 km) to the northeast, and Chilly Peak is 1.3 miles (2.1 km) to the southeast. Ice Box is situated 1.25 miles (2.01 km) south of Ice Lakes in the Okanogan-Wenatchee National Forest. Precipitation runoff from the mountain drains east into Ice Creek, or west into Box Creek. This peak is positioned between these two creeks, hence its name.

== Climate ==
Lying east of the Cascade crest, the area around Ice Box is a bit drier than areas to the west. Summers can bring warm temperatures and occasional thunderstorms. Most weather fronts originate in the Pacific Ocean, and travel northeast toward the Cascade Mountains. As fronts approach the North Cascades, they are forced upward by the peaks of the Cascade Range, causing them to drop their moisture in the form of rain or snowfall onto the Cascades (Orographic lift). As a result, the North Cascades experiences high precipitation, especially during the winter months in the form of snowfall. With its impressive height, Ice Box can have snow on it in late-spring and early-fall, and can be very cold in the winter.

== Geology ==
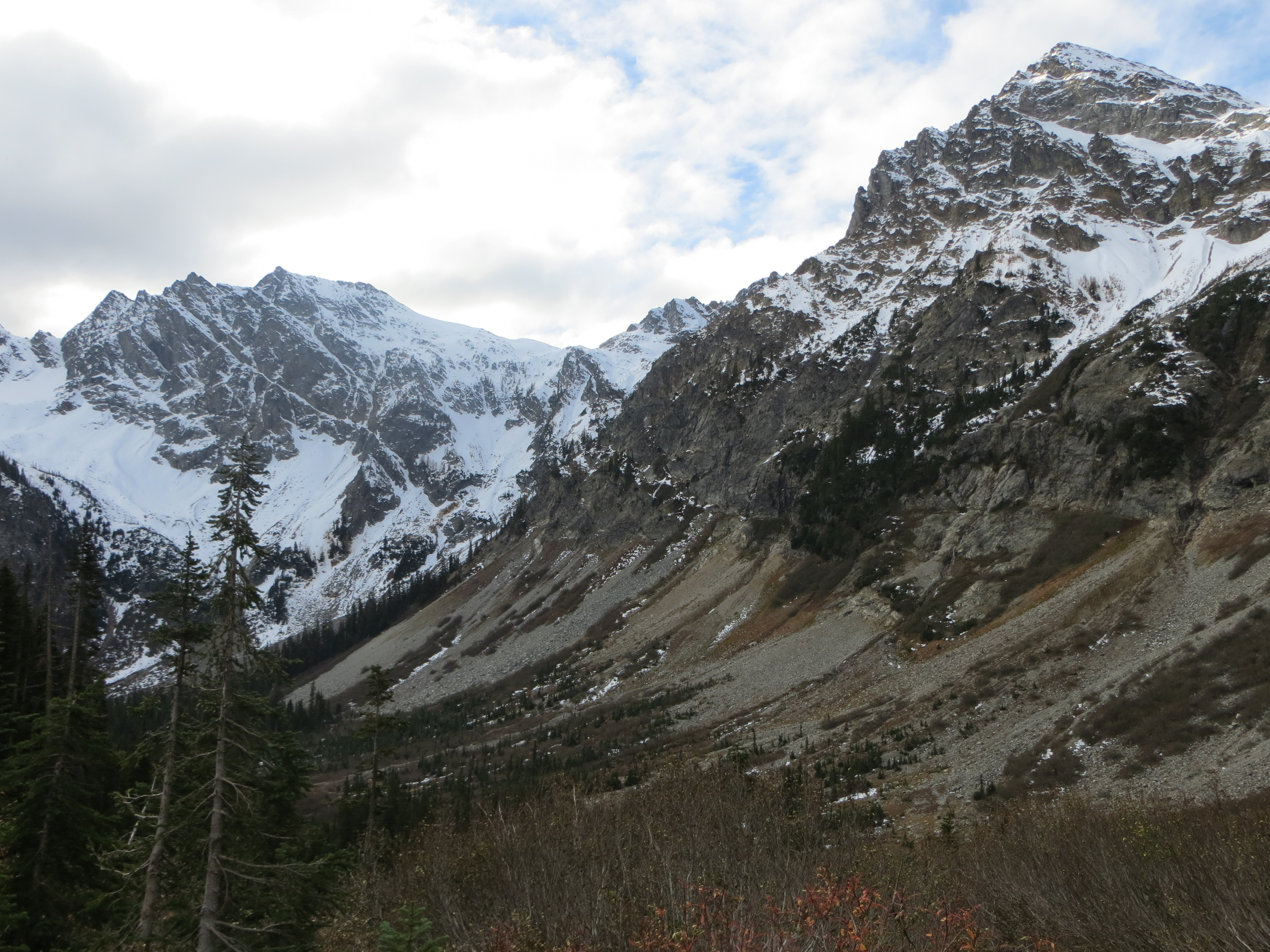
Ice Box (right) from trail to Ice Lakes, (Peak 7919 to left)

The North Cascades features some of the most rugged topography in the Cascade Range with craggy peaks, ridges, and deep glacial valleys. Geological events occurring many years ago created the diverse topography and drastic elevation changes over the Cascade Range leading to the various climate differences. These climate differences lead to vegetation variety defining the ecoregions in this area.

The history of the formation of the Cascade Mountains dates back millions of years ago to the late Eocene Epoch. With the North American Plate overriding the Pacific Plate, episodes of volcanic igneous activity persisted. Glacier Peak, a stratovolcano that is 14.7 mi (23.7 km) west of Ice Box, began forming in the mid-Pleistocene. Due to Glacier Peak's proximity to Ice Box, volcanic ash and tephra is common in the area.

During the Pleistocene period dating back over two million years ago, glaciation advancing and retreating repeatedly scoured the landscape leaving deposits of rock debris. The U-shaped cross section of the river valleys is a result of recent glaciation. Uplift and faulting in combination with glaciation have been the dominant processes which have created the tall peaks and deep valleys of the North Cascades area.

== Gallery ==
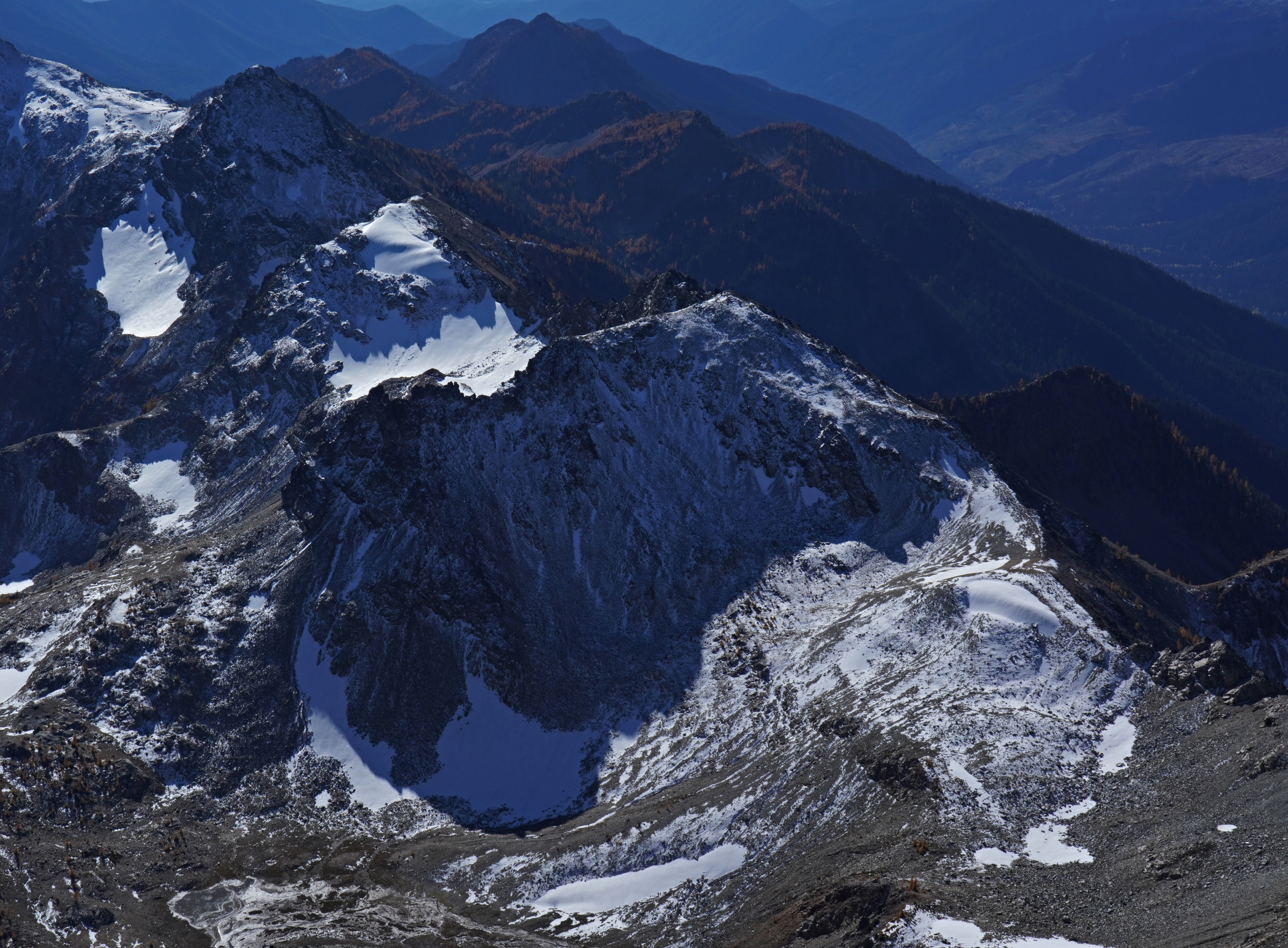
View from Mount Maude with Freezer front/center, and Ice Box upper left

== See also ==
- Geography of Washington (state)
- Geology of the Pacific Northwest
