= Mount Maude =

Mountain in Washington (state), United States

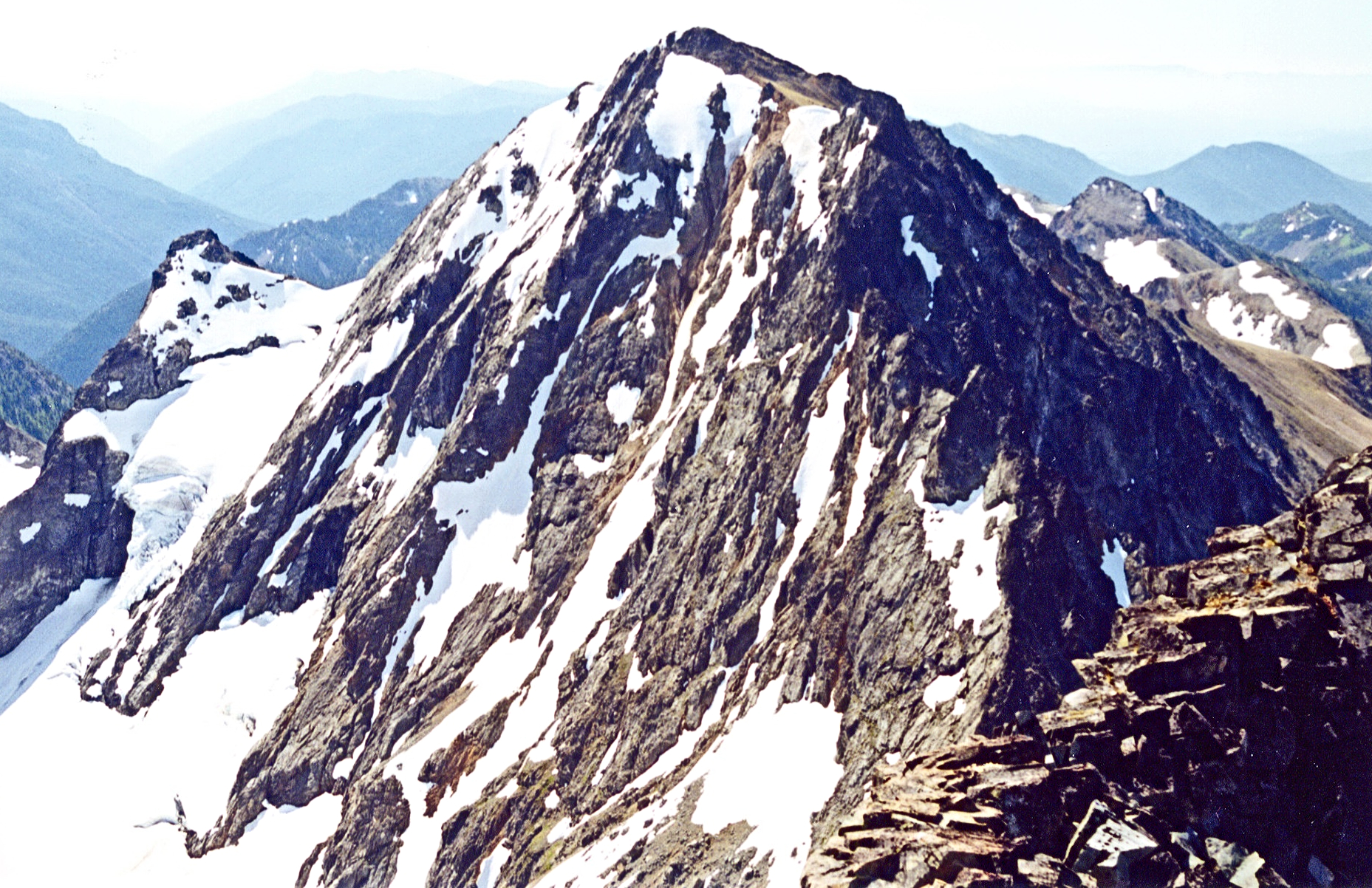
- North Face of Mount Maude seen from Seven Fingered Jack

Highest point
- Elevation: 9040+ ft (2755+ m) NGVD 29
- Prominence: 882 ft (269 m)
- Coordinates: 48°08′14″N 120°48′14″W

Geography
- Location within Washington (state)
- Location: Chelan County, Washington, U.S.
- Parent range: North Cascades, Entiat Mountains
- Topo map: USGS Holden

Climbing
- First ascent: August 19, 1932 by Hermann F. Ulrichs and John Burnett.
- Easiest route: South slopes

Mount Maude is the 15th highest peak in Washington state. The peak is located in the Entiat Mountains, a subrange of the North Cascades. It is in the Glacier Peak Wilderness, at the headwaters of the Entiat River. The peak was given its name by Albert H. Sylvester in honor of Frederick Stanley Maude.

The mountain from the south side consists of mostly talus with small rocky outcroppings, often compared with mountains in the Colorado Rockies. The northeast side is much different, with a steep rocky summit sheltering the small Entiat Glacier. Most climbers will climb Maude, Seven Fingered Jack, and sometimes Mount Fernow in the same trip.

== Geology ==
The mountain is made of Cretaceous Orthogneiss, and Tonalite. The flank of the mountain on the southwest side are made of Triassic Orthogneiss and Triassic to Permian Heterogeneous Metamorphic rock. While the northeast side also consist of Eocene Quartz Diorite, and small marble deposits. Many normal faults are present as well as one small strike-slip fault near Spectacle Buttes.

== Routes ==
- West Gully class 3
- North Face class 3 very steep snow
- South slopes class 2

== Gallery ==
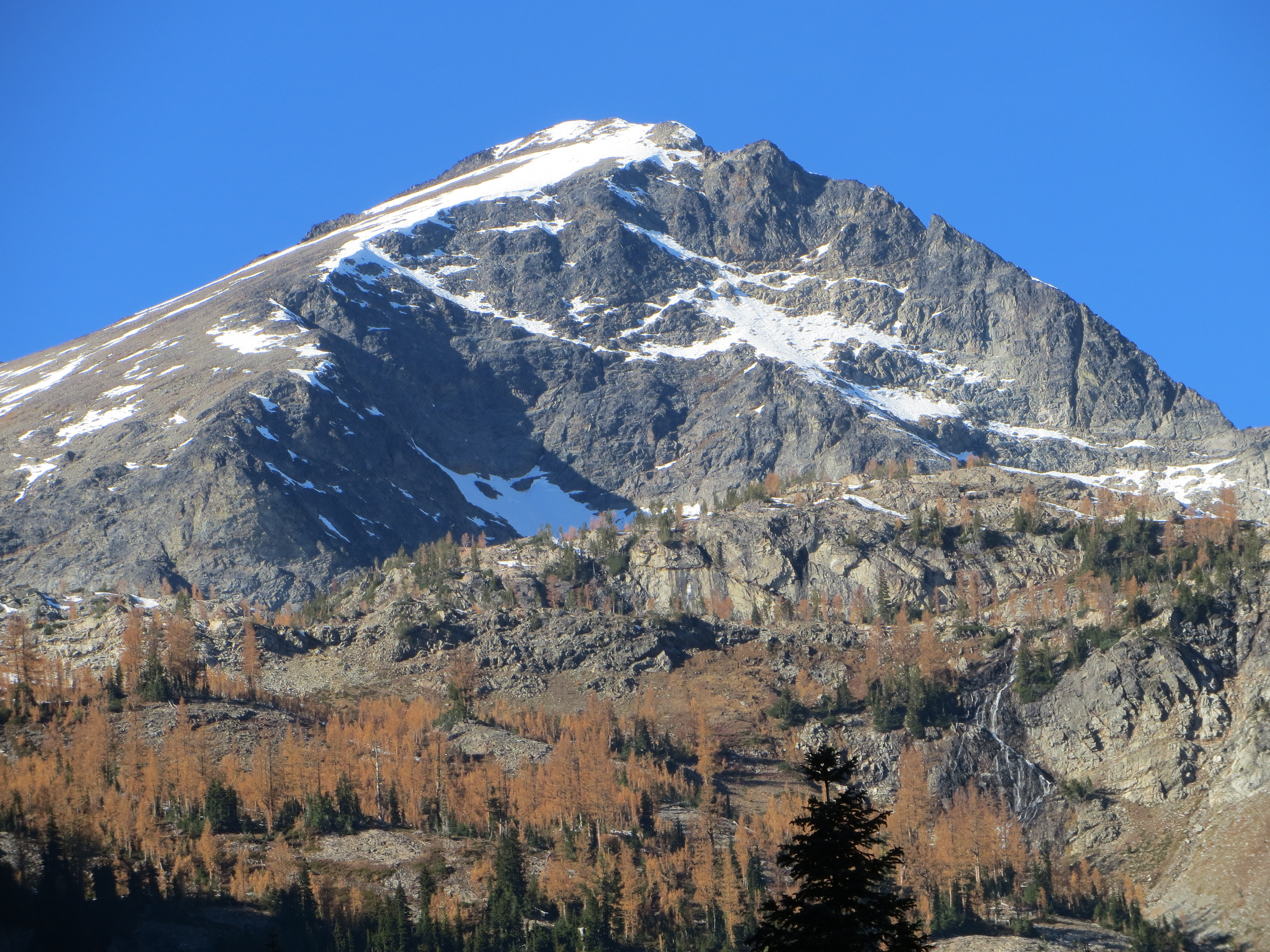

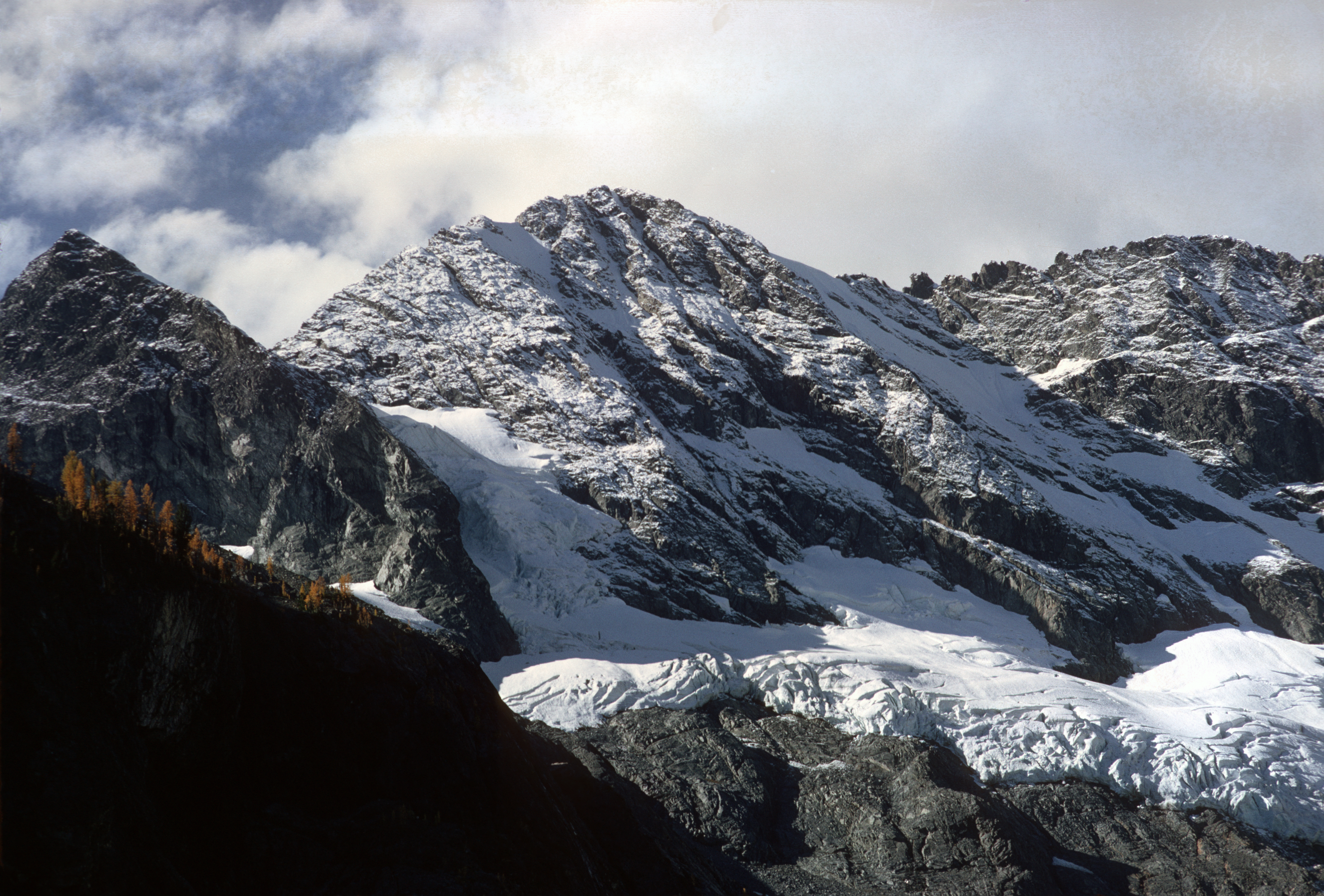
Mt. Maude & Entiat Glacier

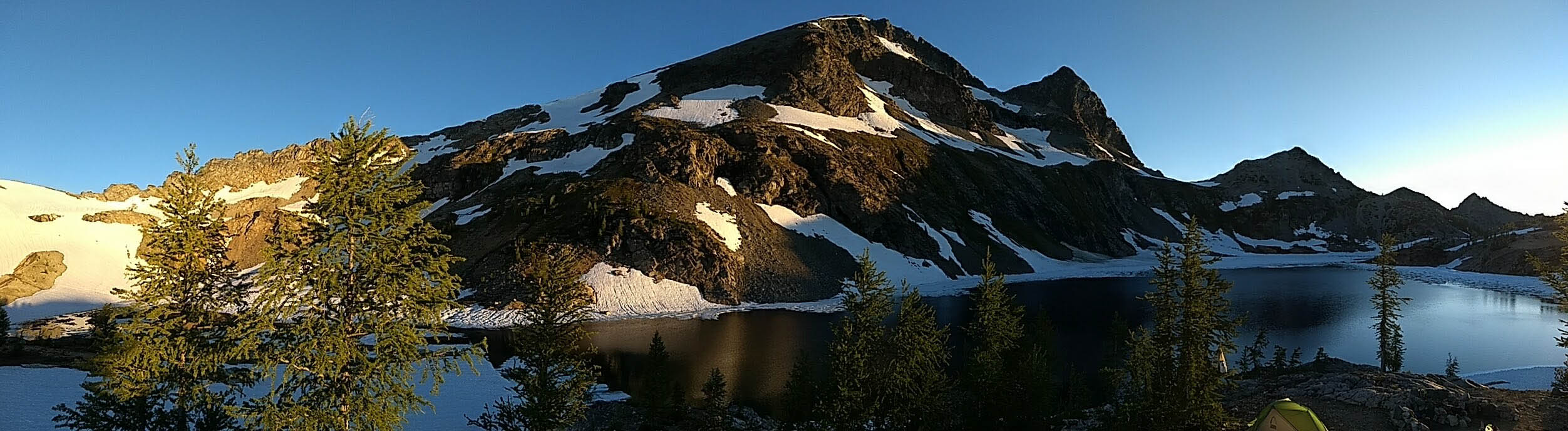
Maude and Upper Ice Lake
