= Chelan Mountains =

Mountain range in Washington, U.S.

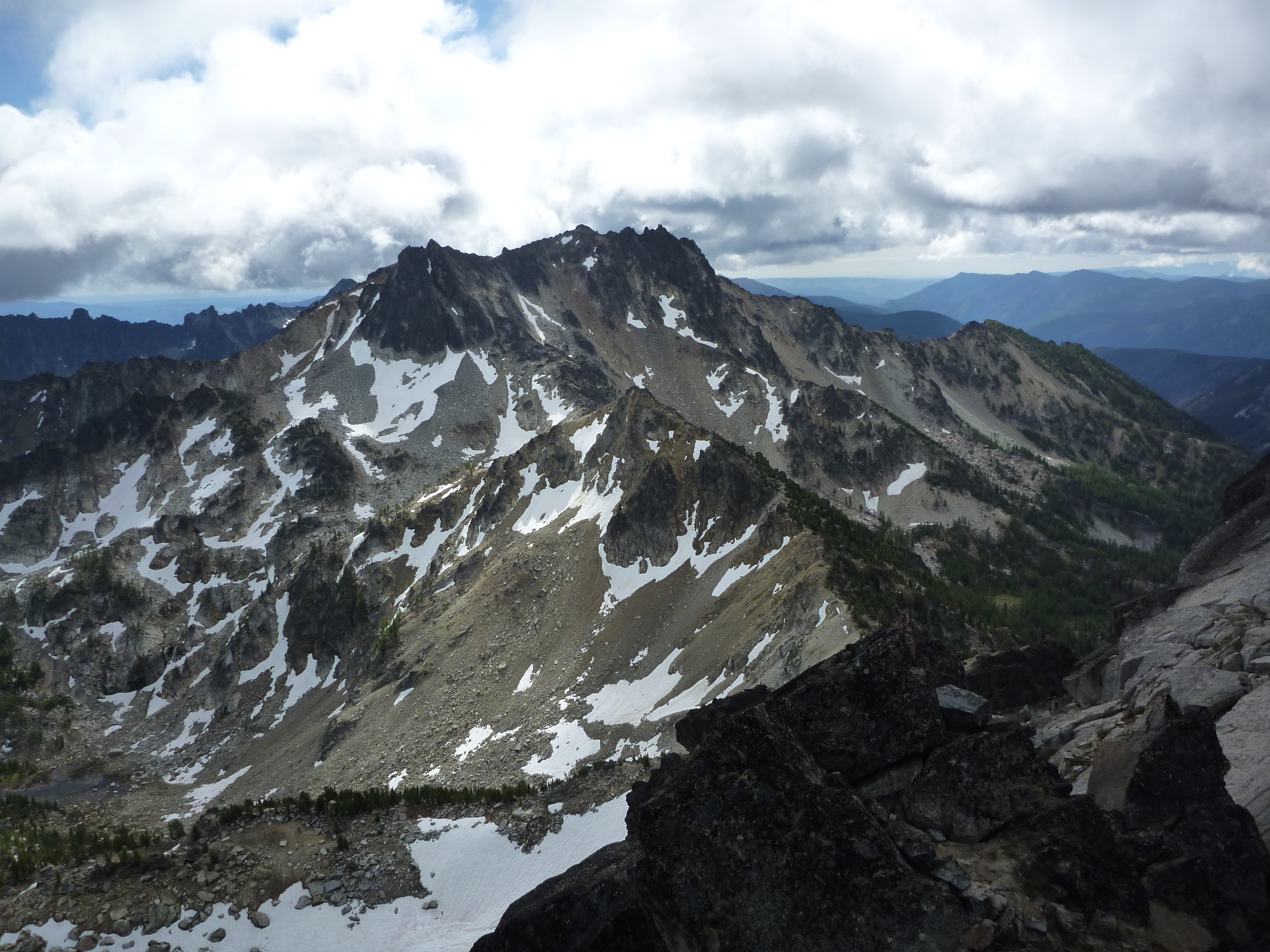
- Cardinal Peak, Chelan Mountains

Highest point
- Peak: Cardinal Peak
- Elevation: 8,590 ft (2,620 m)

Dimensions
- Length: 40 mi (64 km) NW-SE
- Width: 8 mi (13 km) SW-NE
- Area: 477 mi^{2} (1,240 km^{2})

Geography
- Location within Washington (state)
- Country: United States
- State: Washington
- County: Chelan
- Range coordinates: 47°55′N 120°22′W
- Parent range: North Cascades; Cascade Range
- Borders on: Entiat Mountains, Columbia Plateau, Columbia River, Entiat River and Lake Chelan

The Chelan Mountains, or Chelan Range is a mountain range in the U.S. state of Washington. Located west of the Columbia River, north of the Entiat River, and south of Lake Chelan, the range is part of the North Cascades section of the Cascade Range. The Chelan Range is about 40 mi (64 km) long northwest to southeast and about 8 mi (13 km) wide, southwest to northeast.

The Chelan Mountains stretch south to the Columbia River between the Entiat River and the Chelan River. The northern end the Chelan Range merges with the northern end of the Entiat Mountains. Most of the range is within Wenatchee National Forest. The northern end is part of the Glacier Peak Wilderness.

The highest peak of the Chelan Mountains is Cardinal Peak, at 8,590 ft (2,620 m). Other major peaks include Emerald Peak, Saska Peak, Pinnacle Mountain, Pyramid Mountain, and Gopher Mountain. All these peaks are over 8,000 ft (2,400 m). They are all located in the northern part of the Chelan Range. The highest peak of the southern portion is Stormy Mountain, at 7,198 ft (2,194 m).

The range's name comes from the Chelan tribe. A large number of place names, including many of the mountain names, were given by Albert H. Sylvester.

== See also ==
- List of mountain ranges
- List of mountain ranges in Washington
