= Entiat River =

River in Washington State, U.S.

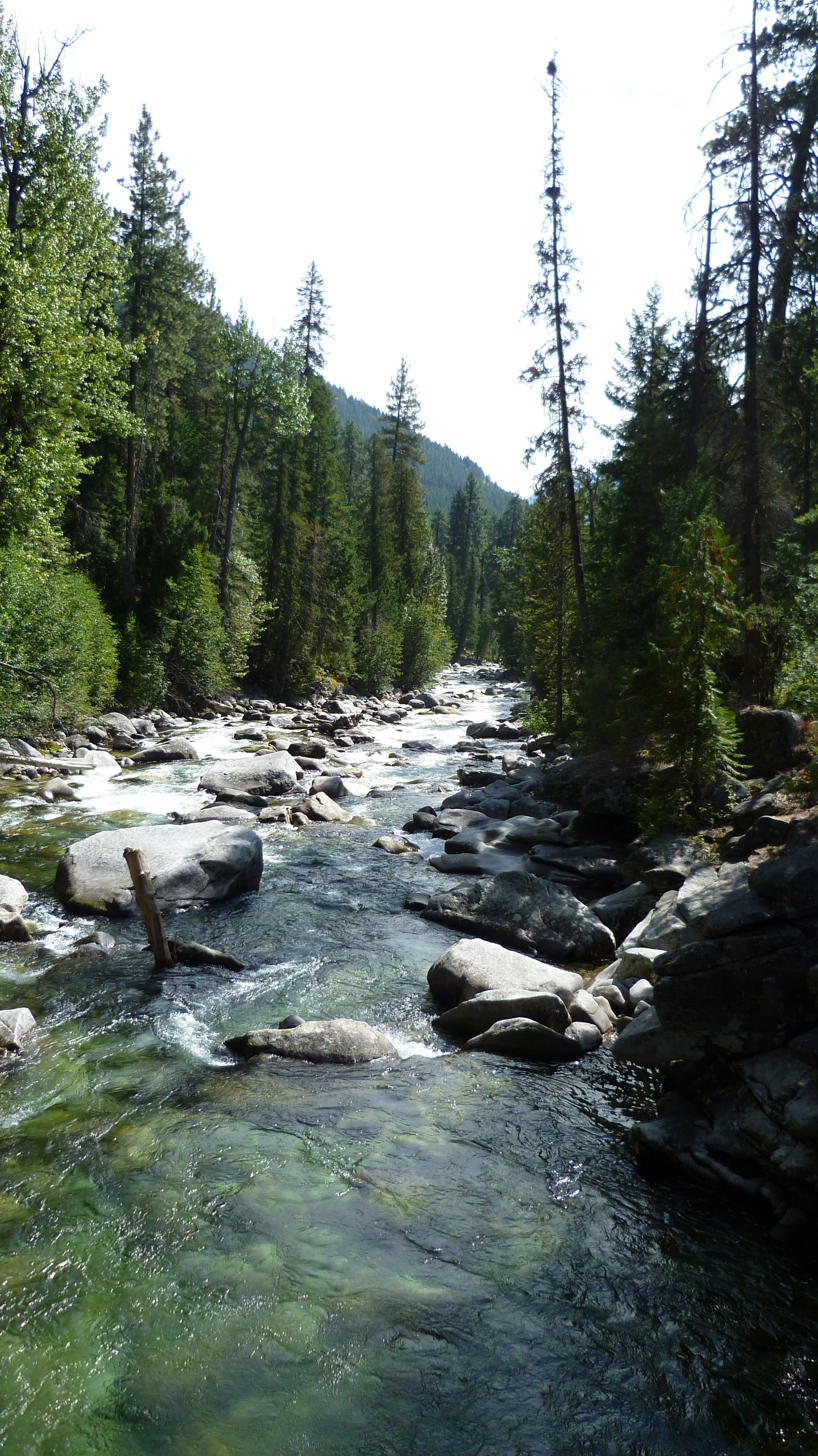

- Location of the mouth of the Entiat River in Washington Entiat River (the United States)

Location
- Country: United States
- State: Washington
- County: Chelan

Physical characteristics
- Source: Cascade Range
  - coordinates: 48°9′1″N 120°47′58″W
- Mouth: Columbia River
  - coordinates: 47°39′40″N 120°13′28″W
- Length: 57 mi (92 km)
- Basin size: 466 sq mi (1,210 km^{2})
- Discharge
  - location: river mile 1.4 near Entiat
  - average: 471 cu ft/s (13.3 m^{3}/s)
  - minimum: 58 cu ft/s (1.6 m^{3}/s)
  - maximum: 4,810 cu ft/s (136 m^{3}/s)

The Entiat River is a tributary of the Columbia River, joining the Columbia near Entiat. The United States Geological Survey (USGS) lists two variant names for the Entiat River: En-ti-at-kwa River and Entiatqua River. The river's name is derived from the Columbia-Moses (Salishan) term /nt'yátk^{w}/ [nt'iátk^{w}], meaning "place of grassy water"; another source states that it was called Enteatqua which means "Rapid Water" or "Rushing Water." The name, spelled "Entiat", was selected for the river in 1958 by the Chelan County Public Utility District.

The Entiat River is located entirely within Chelan County, in Washington state in the United States. Over 90% of the drainage basin of the Entiat River and its tributaries is publicly owned property, mostly the Wenatchee National Forest. A large number of place names in the Entiat River basin were given by Albert H. Sylvester.

== Course ==
The Entiat River's headwaters lie in the Glacier Peak Wilderness of the Wenatchee National Forest. Its main source comes from the slopes of Mount Maude and Seven Fingered Jack, and Entiat Glacier. From there the river flows east through Entiat Meadows before turning south. It flows south and southeast between the Entiat Mountains on the west and the Chelan Mountains on the east.

Downstream from the main river's confluence with the North Fork Entiat River, the Entiat River falls over Entiat Falls. It collects the waters of many small tributary creeks, including the Mad River, Larch Lakes River, Cow Creek, and Myrtle Lake.

In its final miles, the Entiat River turns east to join the Columbia River at Columbia river mile 483.7, just south of the small city of Entiat. At this point the Columbia River is a reservoir created by Rocky Reach Dam. The reservoir's name is Lake Entiat. Fern Lake is located at the headwaters of the North Fork Entiat. Entiat Glacier, located in a cirque on the eastern side of Mount Maude and Seven Fingered Jack, is the headwaters of the Entiat River.

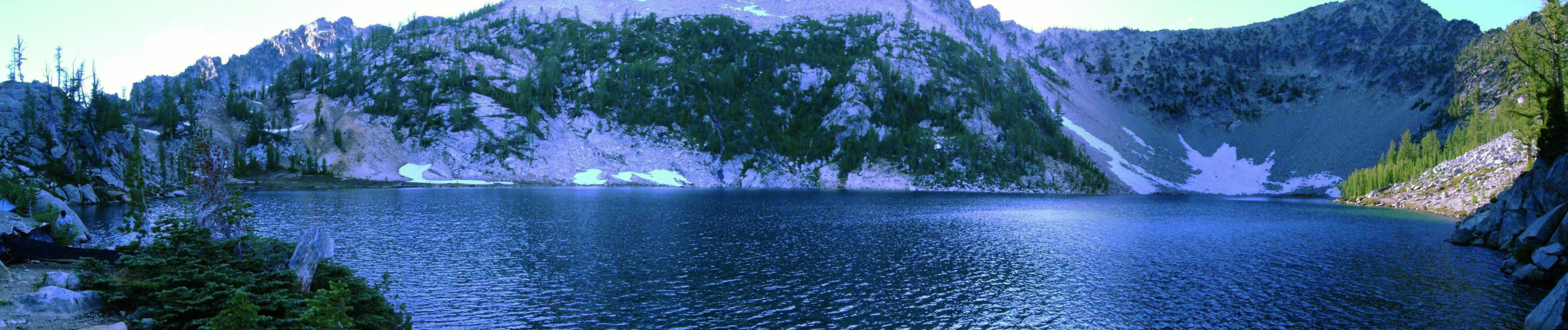
Fern Lake, at the headwaters of the North Fork Entiat.

== Flora and fauna ==
The Entiat River supports populations of Chinook salmon, steelhead trout, bull trout and Lamprey. The populations are relatively small due to the scarcity of juvenile-rearing habitat in the lower Entiat River, However, due to the Entiat National Fish Hatchery (USFWS) there is a robust Summer Chinook fishery.

== See also ==
- List of rivers of Washington (state)
- List of tributaries of the Columbia River

== Sources ==
- "Washington Road & Recreation Atlas". Benchmark Maps, 2000.
- Entiat River Basin, Washington Department of Ecology
