= Washington State Route 207 =

State highway in Chelan County, Washington, US

State Route 207

- SR 207 highlighted in red

Route information
- Auxiliary route of US 2
- Maintained by WSDOT
- Length: 4.38 mi (7.05 km)
- Existed: 1964–present

Major junctions
- South end: US 2 at Coles Corner
- North end: Chiwawa Loop Road in Lake Wenatchee State Park

Location
- Country: United States
- State: Washington
- Counties: Chelan

Highway system
- State highways in Washington; Interstate; US; State; Scenic; Pre-1964; 1964 renumbering; Former
← SR 206	→ SR 211

State Route 207 (SR 207) is a 4.38-mile-long (7.05 km) state highway serving Wenatchee National Forest and Lake Wenatchee State Park in Chelan County, located within the U.S. state of Washington. The highway travels north along Nason Creek from an intersection with U.S. Route 2 (US 2) at Coles Corner to Chiwawa Loop Road on the eastern shore of Lake Wenatchee. SR 207 was previously signed as part of Secondary State Highway 15C (SSH 15C) and SSH 15D until the 1964 highway renumbering, when SSH 15C was split between SR 207 and SR 209. SR 209 was removed from the highway system in 1991 and SR 207 was shortened to end at the former terminus of SR 209.

== Route description ==
SR 207 begins at an intersection with US 2 at Coles Corner within Wenatchee National Forest and travels northeast, following Nason Creek upstream. SR 207 crosses the Wenatchee River into Lake Wenatchee State Park and crosses the Wenatchee River, where it ends at an intersection with Chiwawa Loop Road, formerly SR 209, south of Lake Wenatchee State Airport.

Every year the Washington State Department of Transportation (WSDOT) conducts a series of surveys on its highways in the state to measure traffic volume. This is expressed in terms of annual average daily traffic (AADT), which is a measure of traffic volume for any average day of the year. In 2011, WSDOT calculated that between 2,000 and 2,400 vehicles per day used the highway, mostly at Coles Corner.

== History ==
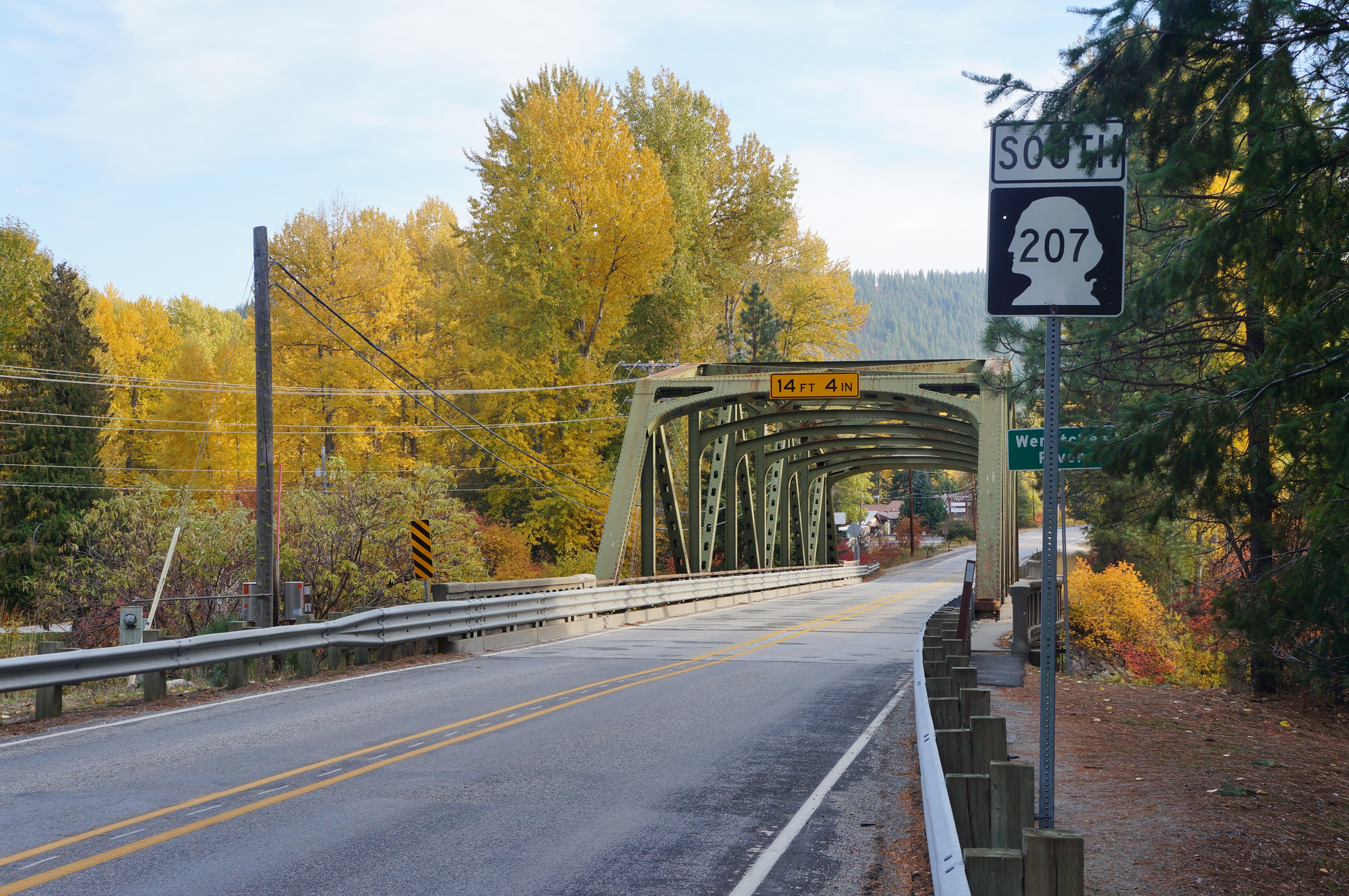
SR 207 southbound at the Wenatchee River bridge

A road connecting a Great Northern rail line to Lake Wenatchee was built by 1904, and was designated as part of SSH 15C in 1937, traveling from PSH 15, concurrent with US 10, at Coles Corner to PSH 15 and US 10 in Leavenworth via Lake Wenatchee State Park. SSH 15D was also established in 1937, traveling west from SSH 15C to Telma. US 10 was moved south in the 1940s and replaced by US 10 Alternate, which was later replaced by US 2 in 1946. After the 1964 highway renumbering, SSH 15C was split between SR 207 and SR 209, with SSH 15D becoming an extension of SR 207. SR 209 and a 5.99-mile-long (9.64 km) segment of SR 207 from Chiwawa Loop Road to Telma were removed from the state highway system in 1991, and no major revisions to the highway have occurred since 1991.

== Major intersections ==
The entire highway is in Chelan County.

Location	mi	km	Destinations	Notes
Coles Corner	0.00	0.00	US 2 – Wenatchee, Seattle	Southern terminus
Lake Wenatchee State Park	4.38	7.05	Chiwawa Loop Road	Northern terminus; former SR 209
1.000 mi = 1.609 km; 1.000 km = 0.621 mi
