= Labyrinth Mountain =

Mountain summit in Washington state, United States

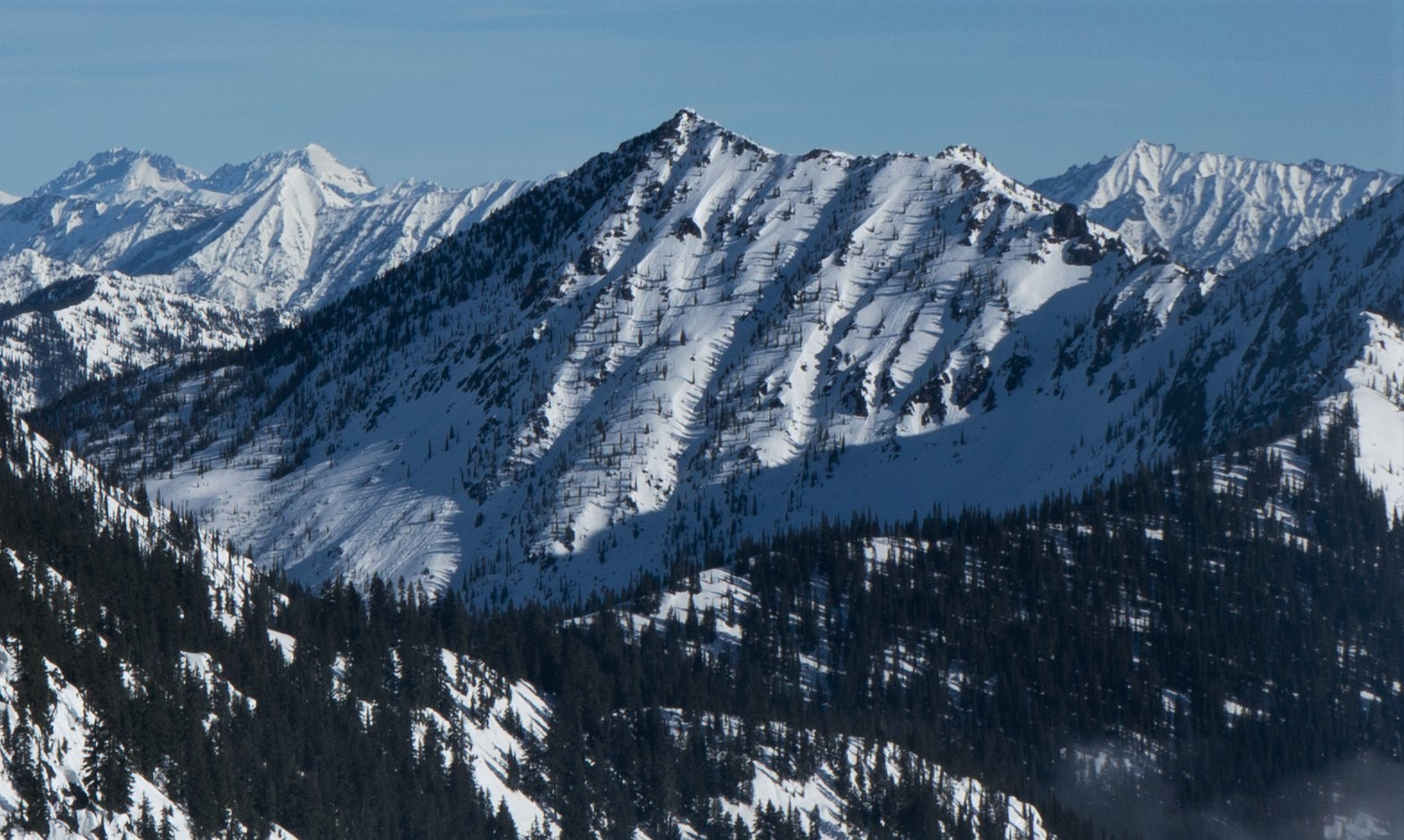
- Southwest aspect from Jove Peak

Highest point
- Elevation: 6,376 ft (1,943 m)
- Prominence: 1,736 ft (529 m)
- Parent peak: Rock Mountain (6,840 ft)
- Isolation: 4.87 mi (7.84 km)
- Coordinates: 47°51′11″N 121°02′36″W

Geography
- Location within Washington (state) Location within the United States
- Interactive map of Labyrinth Mountain
- Country: United States
- State: Washington
- County: Chelan
- Protected area: Henry M. Jackson Wilderness
- Parent range: North Cascades; Cascade Range
- Topo map: USGS Labyrinth Mountain

Climbing
- Easiest route: trail + class 2 scrambling

Labyrinth Mountain is a prominent 6,376 ft (1,940 m) mountain summit located 7.5 mi (12.1 km) north-northeast of Stevens Pass in Chelan County of Washington state. This peak is situated 11 mi (18 km) west of Lake Wenatchee, in the Henry M. Jackson Wilderness, on land managed by the Okanogan–Wenatchee National Forest. Its nearest higher neighbor is Rock Mountain, 4.87 mi (7.84 km) to the southeast. Labyrinth Mountain was named by Albert Hale Sylvester for the appearance of its complex topographic map contour lines, similar to a Labyrinth. In association with Greek mythology, he also named Minotaur and Theseus Lakes on this mountain's southeast aspect. Precipitation runoff from the peak drains into tributaries of the Little Wenatchee River.

== Climate ==
Lying east of the Cascade crest, the area around Labyrinth Mountain is a bit drier than areas to the west. Summers can bring warm temperatures and occasional thunderstorms. Weather fronts originating in the Pacific Ocean travel east toward the Cascade Mountains. As fronts approach, they are forced upward by the peaks of the Cascade Range, causing them to drop their moisture in the form of rain or snow onto the Cascades (Orographic lift). As a result, the western slopes of the Cascades experience high precipitation, especially during the winter months in the form of snowfall. During winter months, weather is usually cloudy, but, due to high pressure systems over the Pacific Ocean that intensify during summer months, there is often little or no cloud cover during the summer. The months July through September offer the most favorable weather for viewing or climbing this peak.

== Geology ==
The North Cascades features some of the most rugged topography in the Cascade Range with craggy peaks, ridges, and deep glacial valleys. Geological events occurring many years ago created the diverse topography and drastic elevation changes over the Cascade Range leading to various climate differences.

The history of the formation of the Cascade Mountains dates back millions of years ago to the late Eocene Epoch. With the North American Plate overriding the Pacific Plate, episodes of volcanic igneous activity persisted. Glacier Peak, a stratovolcano that is 18.2 mi (29.3 km) north of Labyrinth Mountain, began forming in the mid-Pleistocene. In addition, small fragments of the oceanic and continental lithosphere called terranes created the North Cascades about 50 million years ago.

During the Pleistocene period dating back over two million years ago, glaciation advancing and retreating repeatedly scoured and shaped the landscape. Glaciation was most prevalent approximately 18,000 years ago, and most valleys were ice-free by 12,000 years ago. Uplift and faulting in combination with glaciation have been the dominant processes which have created the tall peaks and deep valleys of the North Cascades area.

== Gallery ==
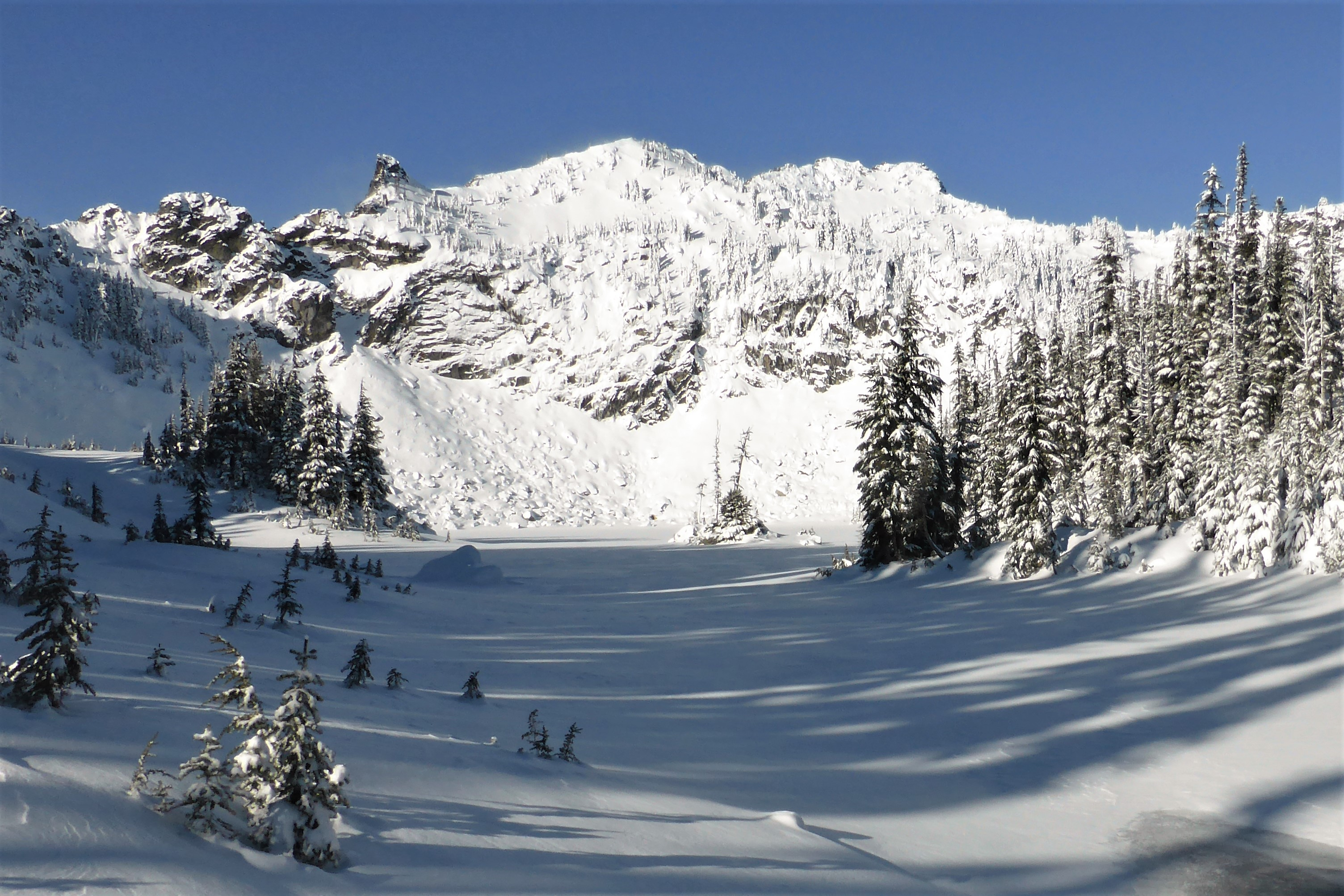
Labyrinth Mountain's south aspect in winter

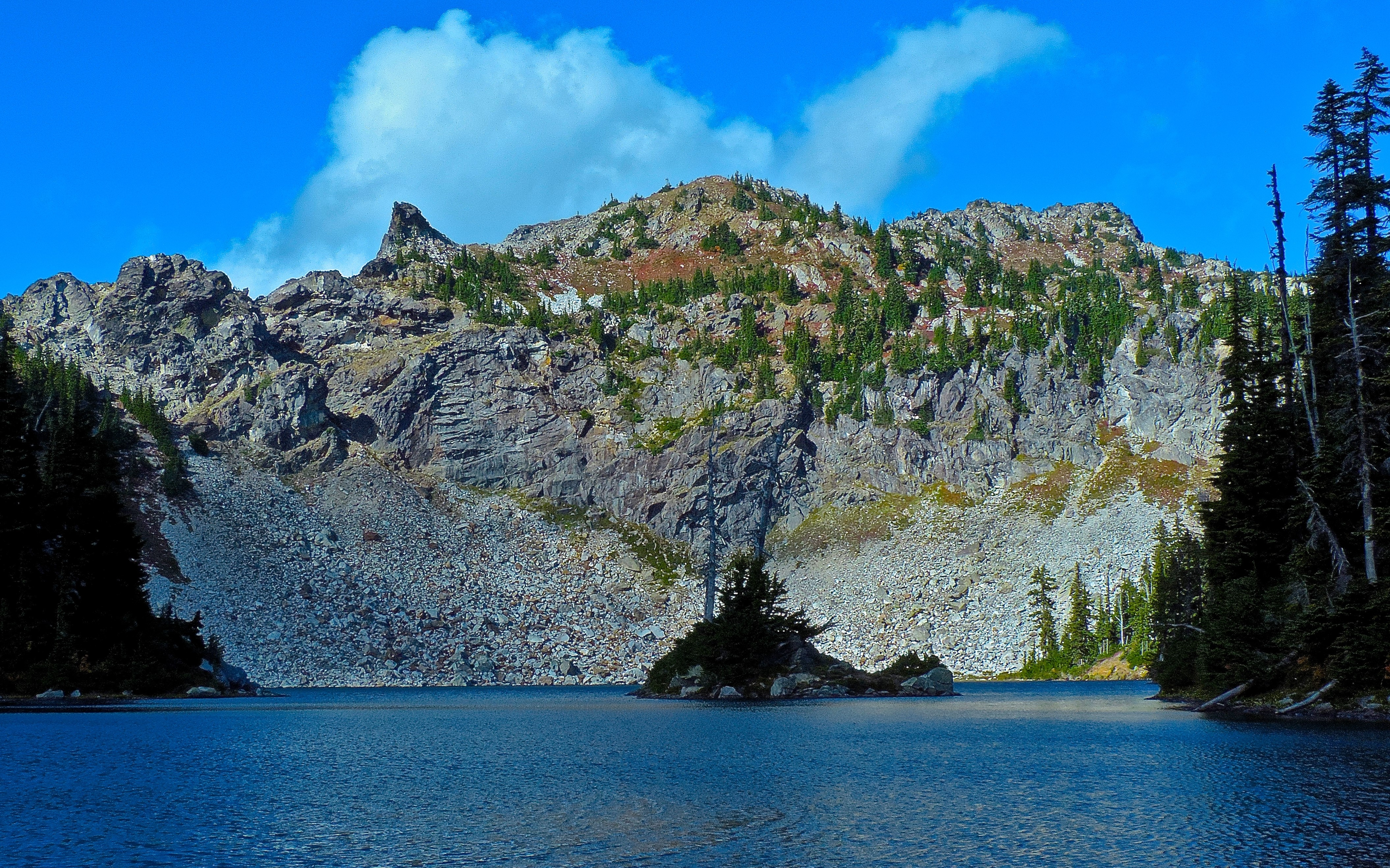
Labyrinth Mountain and Minotaur Lake

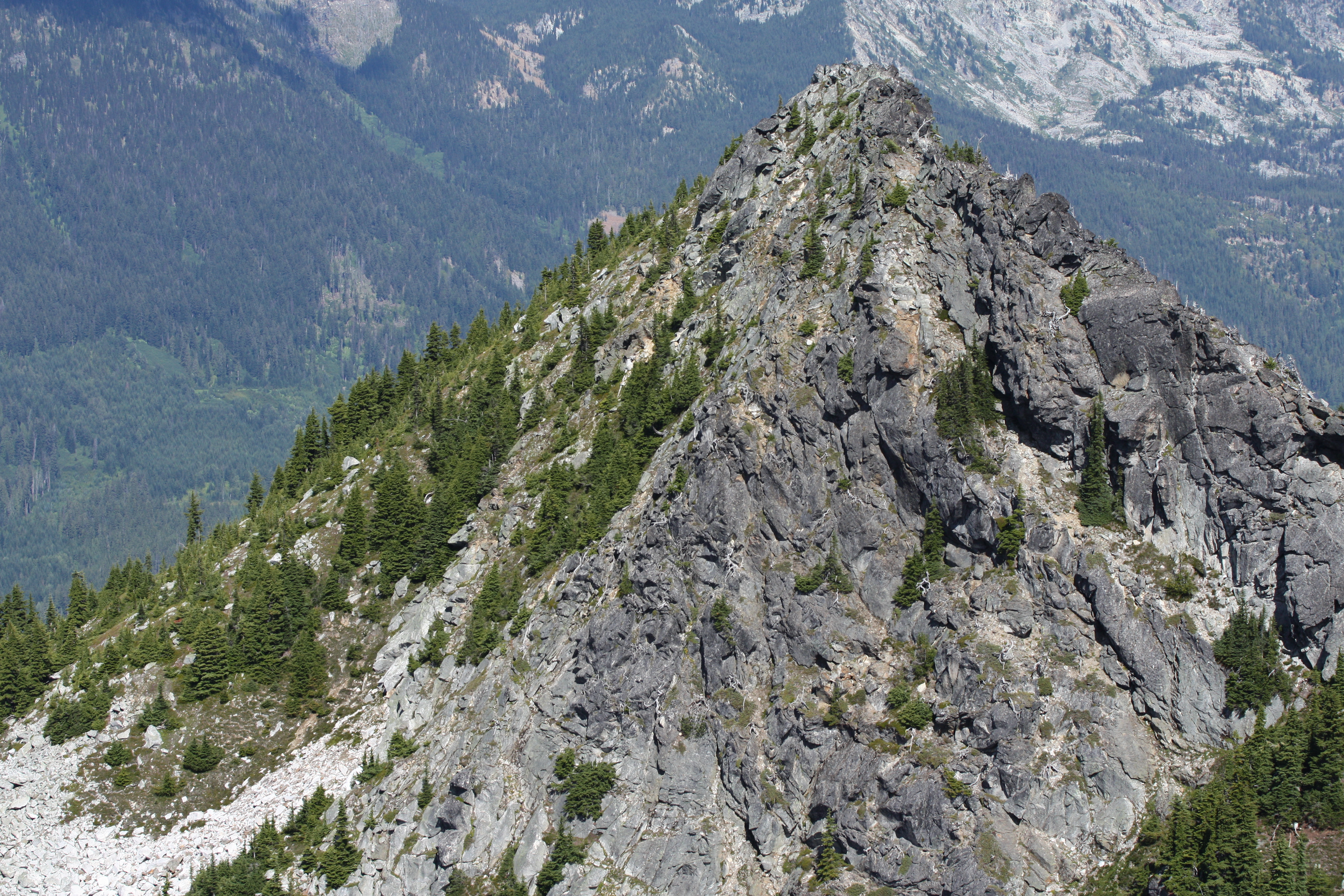
Labyrinth's Northeast Peak (6,287-ft)

== See also ==
- Geology of the Pacific Northwest
- Geography of the North Cascades
