= Mount Mastiff =

Mountain in Washington (state), United States

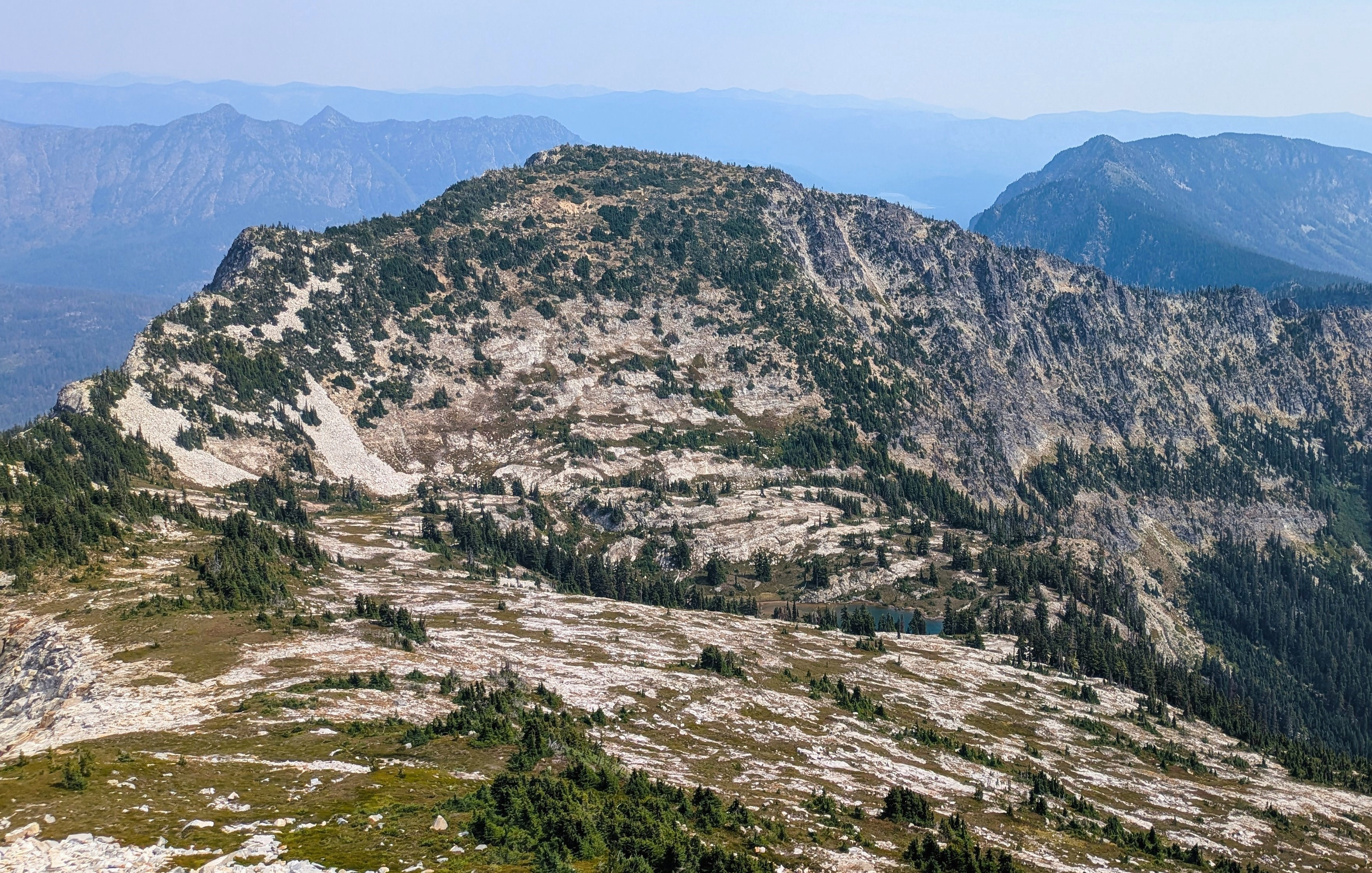
- West aspect

Highest point
- Elevation: 6,747 ft (2,056 m)
- Prominence: 490 ft (149 m)
- Parent peak: Mount Howard (7,063 ft)
- Isolation: 0.90 mi (1.45 km)
- Coordinates: 47°49′04″N 120°56′10″W

Naming
- Etymology: Mastiff

Geography
- Location within Washington (state) Location within the United States
- Interactive map of Mount Mastiff
- Country: United States
- State: Washington
- County: Chelan
- Protected area: Okanogan–Wenatchee National Forest
- Parent range: North Cascades; Cascade Range
- Topo map: USGS Mount Howard

Geology
- Rock age: Late Cretaceous
- Rock type: Migmatitic Gneiss

Climbing
- Easiest route: Scrambling Southeast Ridge

Mount Mastiff is a 6,747-foot-elevation (2,056-meter) mountain in Chelan County of Washington, United States.

== Description ==
Mount Mastiff is the third-highest point of Nason Ridge, and is one mile (1.6 km) east of Mount Howard, which is the highest. This peak is set approximately midway between Stevens Pass and Lake Wenatchee, on land managed by the Okanogan–Wenatchee National Forest. Precipitation runoff from the peak drains into tributaries of the Wenatchee River. Topographic relief is significant as the summit rises over 1,800 feet (549 meters) above Lost Lake in 0.6 mile (0.97 km), and 4,750 feet (1,448 meters) above the Little Wenatchee River in 1.6 miles (2.6 km). The mountain was named by Albert Hale Sylvester on account that the mountain appears from Lake Wenatchee to resemble the head of a dog in profile. The toponym has been officially adopted by the United States Board on Geographic Names.

== Geology ==
The North Cascades feature some of the most rugged topography in the Cascade Range with craggy peaks, ridges, and deep glacial valleys. Geological events occurring many years ago created the diverse topography and drastic elevation changes over the Cascade Range leading to various climate differences.

The history of the formation of the Cascade Mountains dates back millions of years ago to the late Eocene Epoch. With the North American Plate overriding the Pacific Plate, episodes of volcanic igneous activity persisted. Glacier Peak, a stratovolcano that is 22 mi (35 km) north-northwest of Mount Mastiff, began forming in the mid-Pleistocene. In addition, small fragments of the oceanic and continental lithosphere called terranes created the North Cascades about 50 million years ago. Gneissic rock of the Nason Terrane is exposed on Mount Mastiff.

During the Pleistocene period dating back over two million years ago, glaciation advancing and retreating repeatedly scoured and shaped the landscape. Glaciation was most prevalent approximately 18,000 years ago, and most valleys were ice-free by 12,000 years ago. Uplift and faulting in combination with glaciation have been the dominant processes which have created the tall peaks and deep valleys of the North Cascades area.

== Climate ==
Lying east of the Cascade crest, the area around Mount Mastiff is a bit drier than areas to the west. Summers can bring warm temperatures and occasional thunderstorms. Weather fronts originating in the Pacific Ocean travel east toward the Cascade Mountains. As fronts approach, they are forced upward by the peaks of the Cascade Range (Orographic lift), causing them to drop their moisture in the form of rain or snow onto the Cascades. As a result, the western slopes of the Cascades experience high precipitation, especially during the winter months in the form of snowfall. During winter months, weather is usually cloudy, but due to high pressure systems over the Pacific Ocean that intensify during summer months, there is often little or no cloud cover during the summer.

== Gallery ==
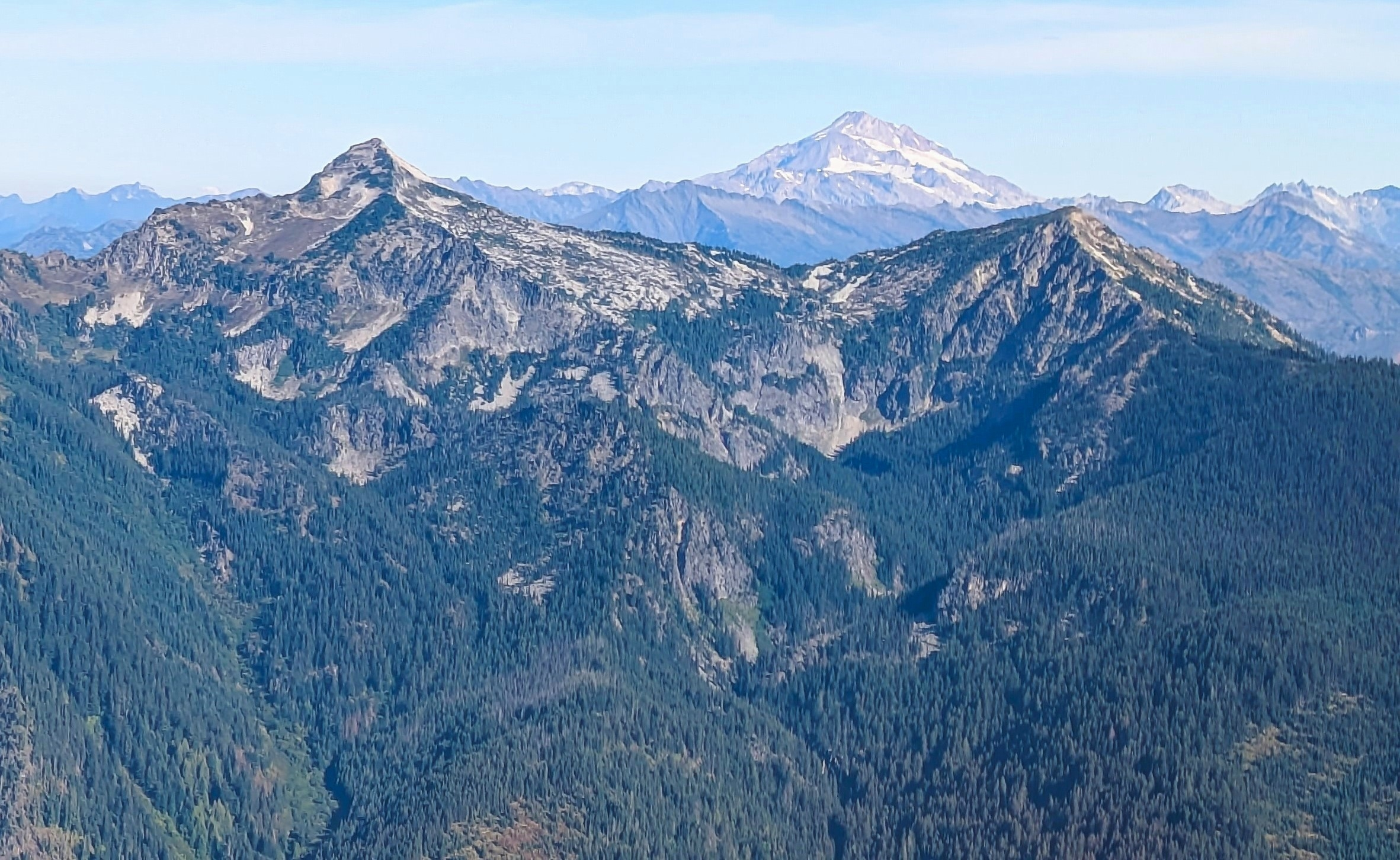
Mount Howard (left) and Mount Mastiff (right) from south, with Glacier Peak in the distance

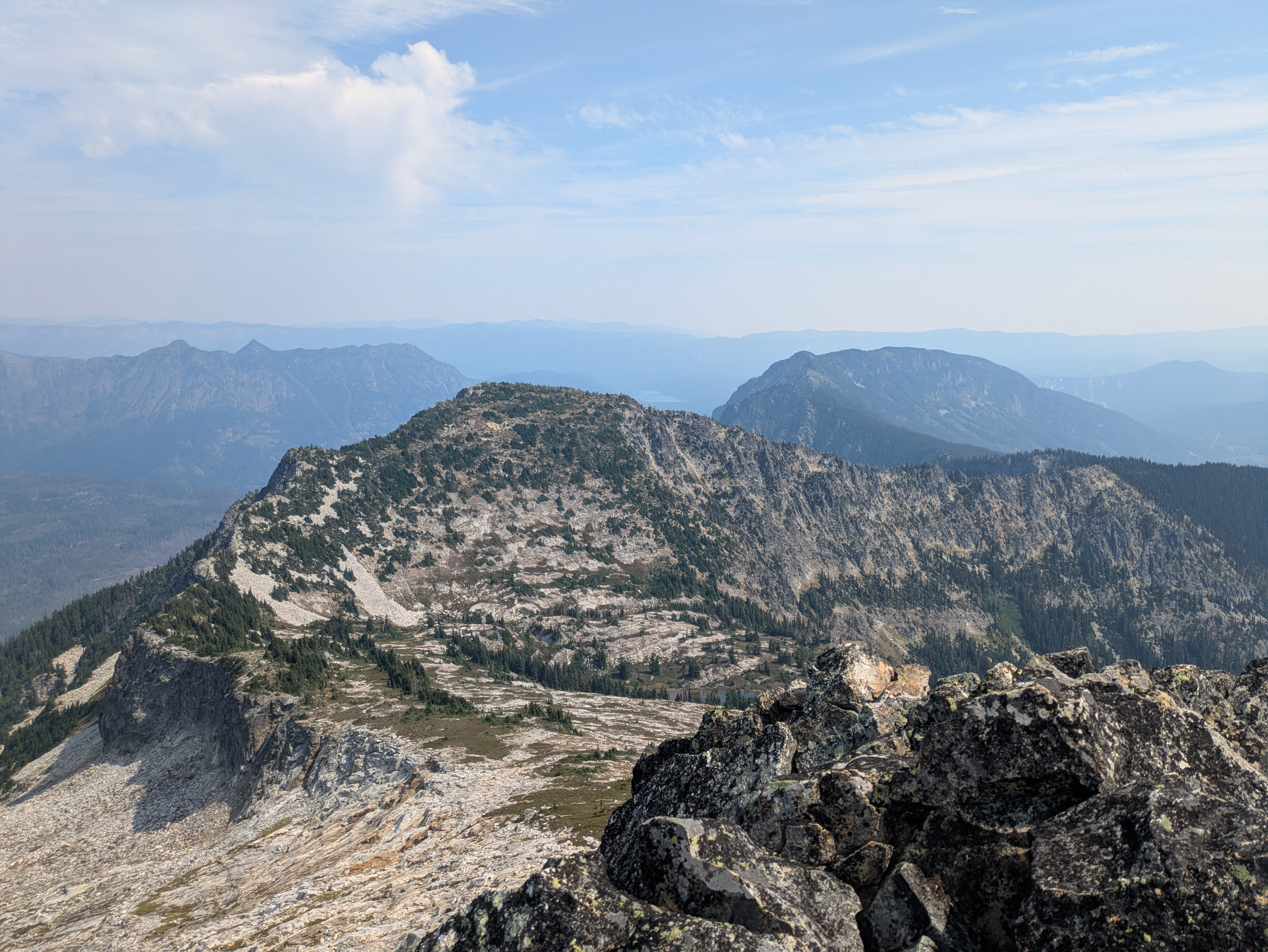
Mount Mastiff viewed from Mount Howard

== See also ==
- Geology of the Pacific Northwest
- Geography of the North Cascades
