= Jove Peak =

Mountain in Washington (state), United States

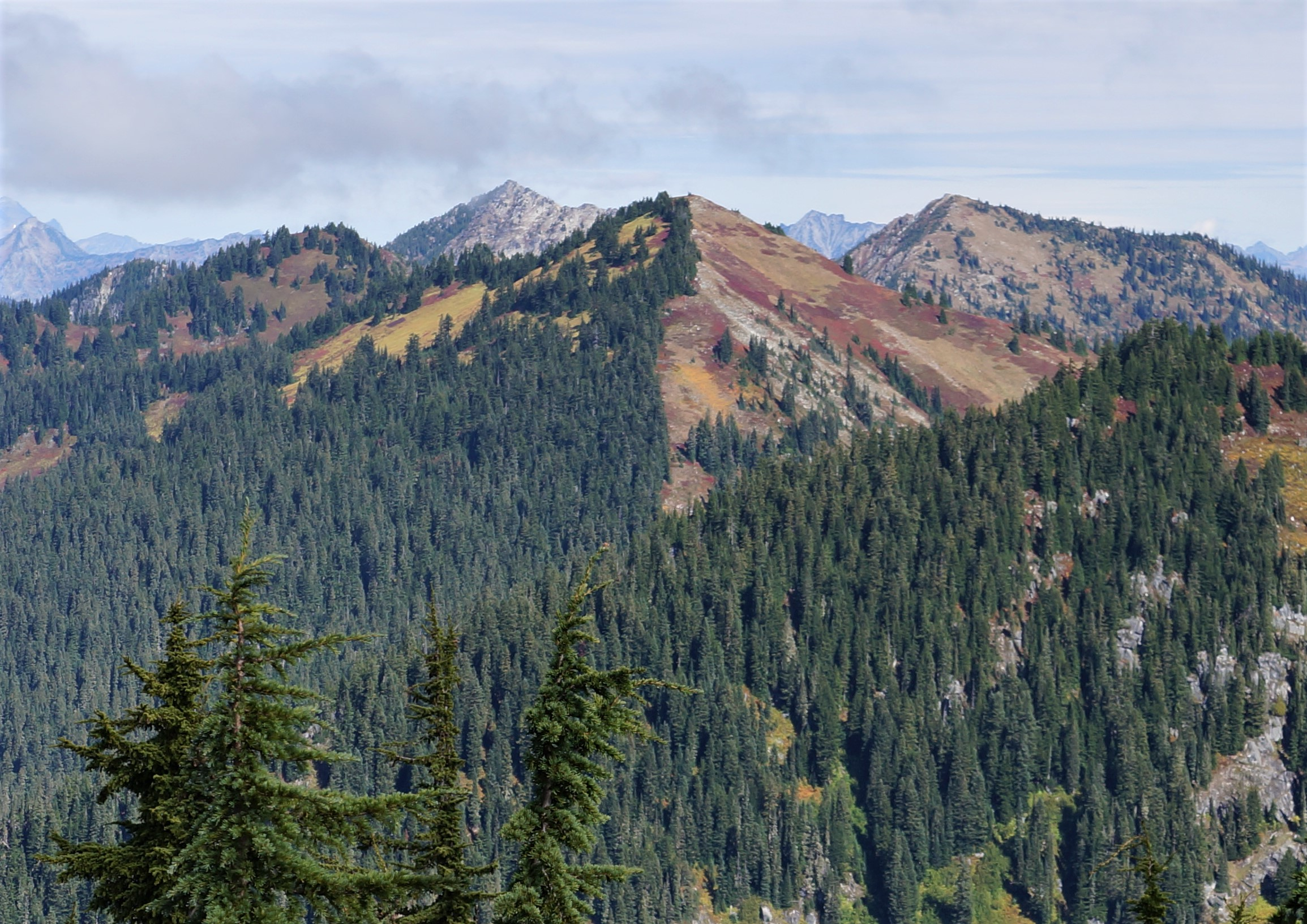
- Southwest aspect from Mt. McCausland

Highest point
- Elevation: 6,007 ft (1,831 m)
- Prominence: 647 ft (197 m)
- Parent peak: Labyrinth Mountain (6,376 ft)
- Isolation: 2.07 mi (3.33 km)
- Coordinates: 47°49′21″N 121°04′27″W

Geography
- Location within Washington (state) Location within the United States
- Interactive map of Jove Peak
- Country: United States
- State: Washington
- County: Snohomish / Chelan
- Protected area: Henry M. Jackson Wilderness
- Parent range: North Cascades; Cascade Range
- Topo map: USGS Labyrinth Mountain

Geology
- Rock type: Orbiculite

Climbing
- Easiest route: scrambling South ridge

Jove Peak is a 6,007 ft (1,830 m) mountain summit located 5 mi (8.0 km) north of Stevens Pass on the common border of Snohomish County with Chelan County in Washington state. This peak is situated 12 mi (19 km) west of Lake Wenatchee, in the Henry M. Jackson Wilderness, on land managed by Mount Baker-Snoqualmie National Forest and Okanogan-Wenatchee National Forest. Jove Peak was named by Albert Hale Sylvester for Jove in association with the mythology-theme of nearby Minotaur and Theseus Lakes which are near Labyrinth Mountain, 2.5 mi (4.0 km) to the northeast. Precipitation runoff from the peak drains west into headwaters of Rapid River, or east into Rainy Creek which is a tributary of the Little Wenatchee River.

== Climate ==
Jove Peak is located in the marine west coast climate zone of western North America. Most weather fronts originating in the Pacific Ocean travel east toward the Cascade Mountains. As fronts approach, they are forced upward by the peaks of the Cascade Range (orographic lift), causing them to drop their moisture in the form of rain or snowfall onto the Cascades. As a result, of lying on the Cascade crest, the area around Jove Peak experiences high precipitation, especially during the winter months in the form of snowfall. During winter months, weather is usually cloudy, but, due to high pressure systems over the Pacific Ocean that intensify during summer months, there is often little or no cloud cover during the summer. Summers can bring occasional thunderstorms. The months July through September offer the most favorable weather for viewing or climbing this peak, but Jove Peak is also a skiing destination in winter.

== Geology ==
The North Cascades features some of the most rugged topography in the Cascade Range with craggy peaks, ridges, and deep glacial valleys. Geological events occurring many years ago created the diverse topography and drastic elevation changes over the Cascade Range leading to various climate differences.

The history of the formation of the Cascade Mountains dates back millions of years ago to the late Eocene Epoch. With the North American Plate overriding the Pacific Plate, episodes of volcanic igneous activity persisted. Glacier Peak, a stratovolcano that is 20 mi (32 km) north of Jove Peak, began forming in the mid-Pleistocene. In addition, small fragments of the oceanic and continental lithosphere called terranes created the North Cascades about 50 million years ago.

During the Pleistocene period dating back over two million years ago, glaciation advancing and retreating repeatedly scoured and shaped the landscape. Glaciation was most prevalent approximately 18,000 years ago, and most valleys were ice-free by 12,000 years ago. Uplift and faulting in combination with glaciation have been the dominant processes which have created the tall peaks and deep valleys of the North Cascades area.

== Gallery ==
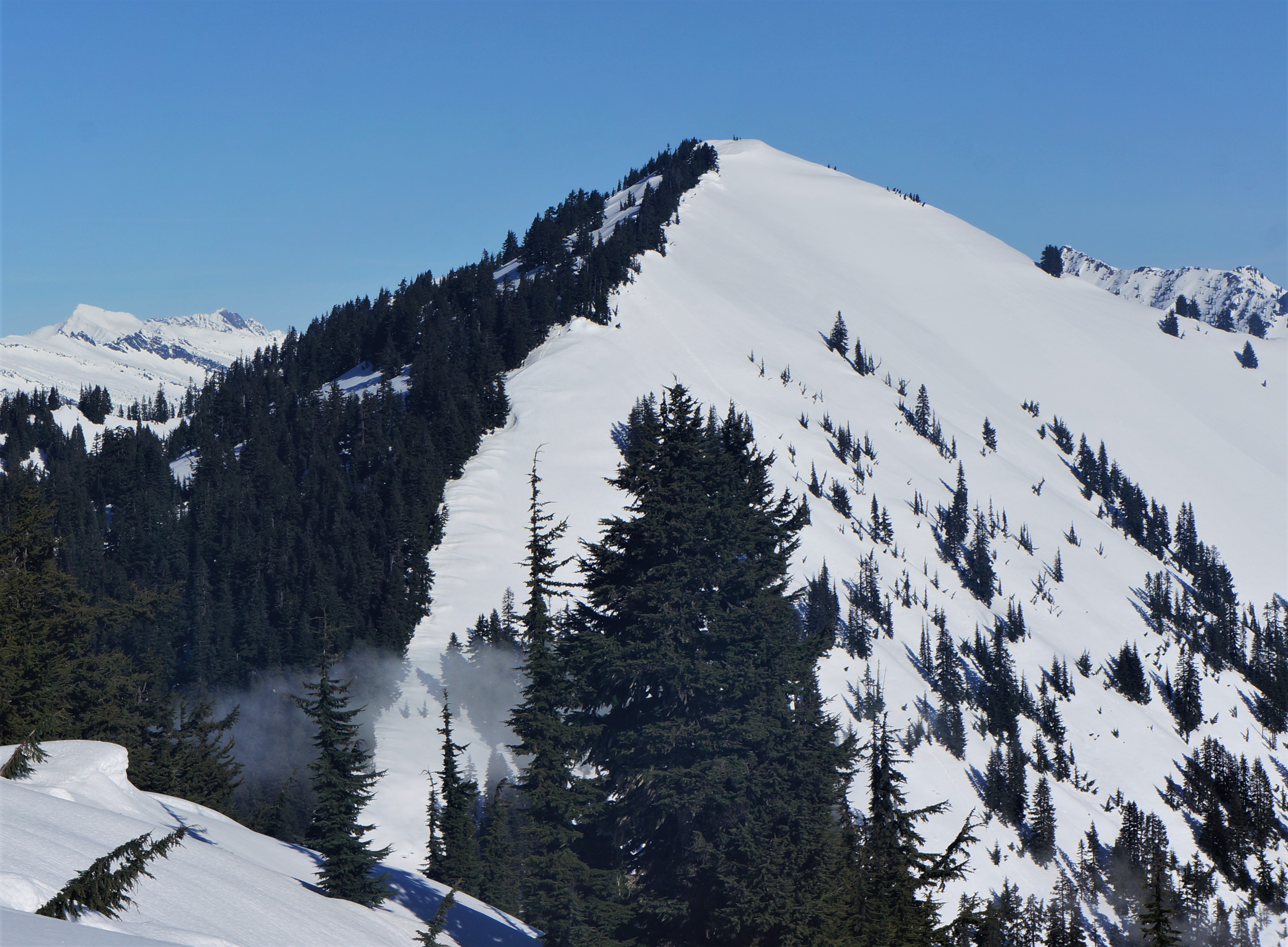
Jove Peak in winter

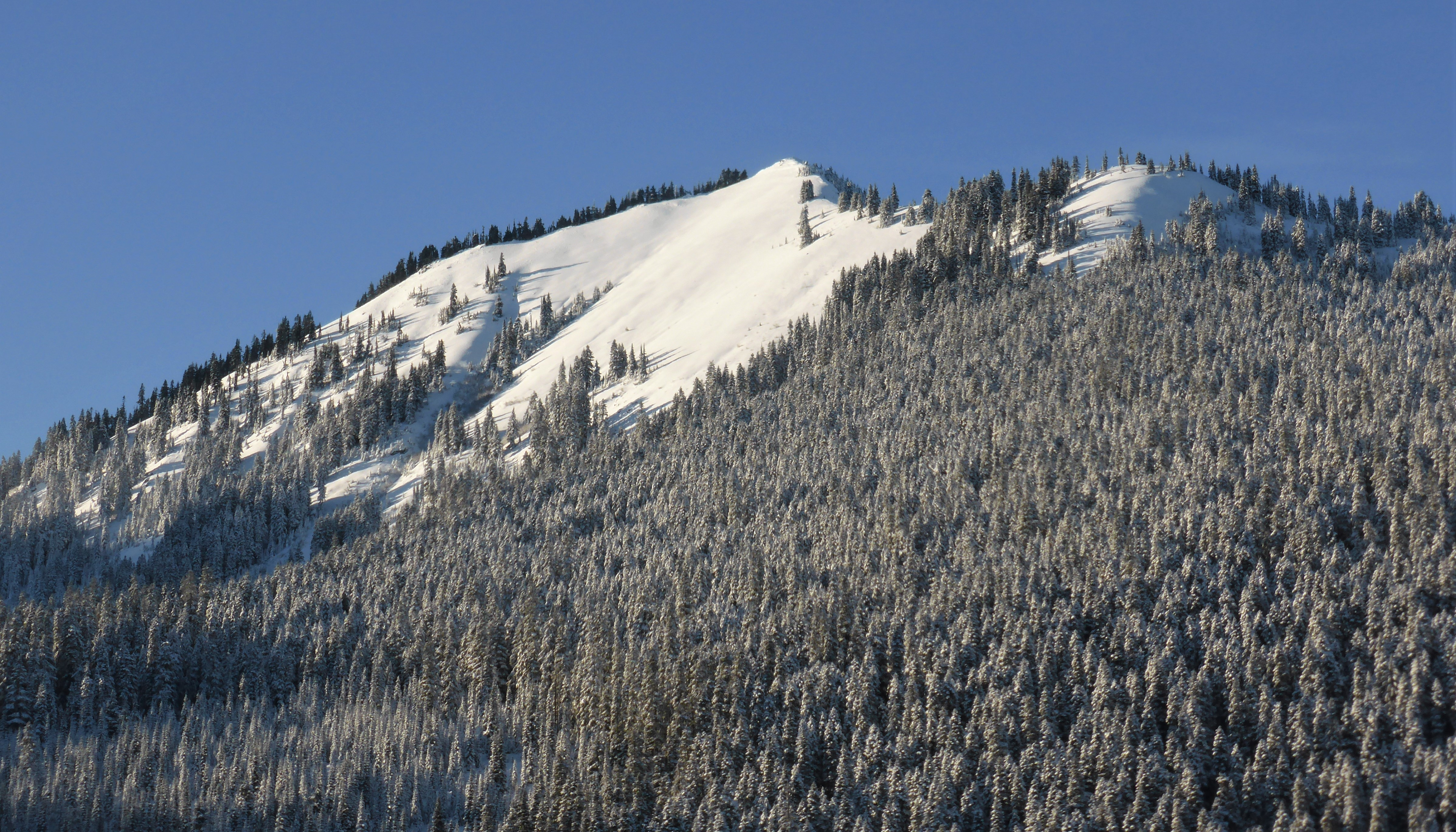
Northeast aspect

== See also ==
- Geology of the Pacific Northwest
- Geography of the North Cascades
