= Kodak Peak =

Mountain in Washington (state), United States

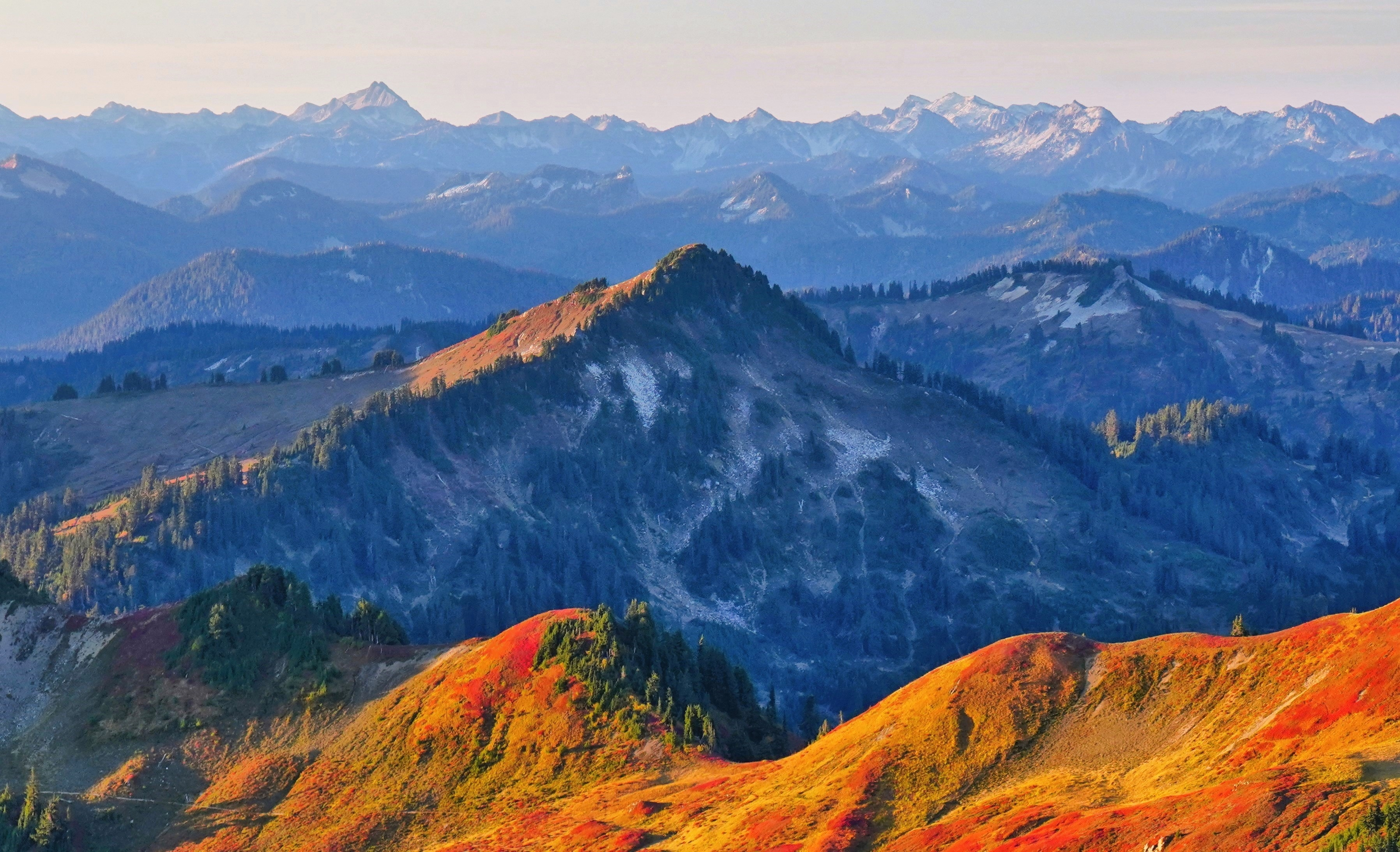
- North aspect, centered

Highest point
- Elevation: 6,132 ft (1,869 m)
- Prominence: 654 ft (199 m)
- Parent peak: Bryant Peak (6,401 ft)
- Isolation: 1.65 mi (2.66 km)
- Coordinates: 47°59′15″N 121°07′47″W

Naming
- Etymology: Kodak

Geography
- Location within Washington (state) Location within the United States
- Interactive map of Kodak Peak
- Country: United States
- State: Washington
- County: Snohomish / Chelan
- Protected area: Glacier Peak Wilderness; Henry M. Jackson Wilderness
- Parent range: Cascade Range; North Cascades
- Topo map: USGS Benchmark Mountain

Kodak Peak is a 6,132-foot-elevation (1,869-meter) summit on the border shared by Chelan and Snohomish counties in Washington, United States.

== Description ==
Kodak Peak is situated on the crest of the Cascade Range and is part of the North Cascades. It straddles the boundary shared by Glacier Peak Wilderness with Henry M. Jackson Wilderness, and is set on land managed by Mount Baker-Snoqualmie National Forest and Okanogan–Wenatchee National Forest. Kodak Peak is located immediately southwest of historic Indian Pass, and 1.86 miles (2.99 km) southwest of Indian Head Peak. Precipitation runoff from the peak's west slope drains to the North Fork Sauk River, the south slope drains into headwaters of the Little Wenatchee River, and the northeast slope drains to Indian Creek which is a tributary of the White River. Topographic relief is significant as the summit rises over 2,300 feet (701 meters) above the North Fork Sauk River in 0.8 miles (1.3 km). The Pacific Crest Trail traverses the south and east slopes of the peak. The summit is climbed via a 16-mile hike that gains 3,100 feet of elevation. The mountain's toponym has been officially adopted by the United States Board on Geographic Names as named by Albert Hale Sylvester. Kodak Peak was named for a Kodak camera lost there by Sylvester's assistant, Willett Ramsdell.

== Geology ==
The North Cascades feature some of the most rugged topography in the Cascade Range with craggy peaks, spires, ridges, and deep glacial valleys. Geological events occurring many years ago created the diverse topography and drastic elevation changes over the Cascade Range leading to the various climate differences.

The history of the formation of the Cascade Mountains dates back millions of years ago to the late Eocene Epoch. With the North American Plate overriding the Pacific Plate, episodes of volcanic igneous activity persisted. Glacier Peak, a stratovolcano that is eight miles (13 km) north of Kodak Peak, began forming in the mid-Pleistocene. Due to Glacier Peak's proximity to Kodak Peak, volcanic ash is common in the area and provides fertile soil for an abundance of wildflowers.

During the Pleistocene period dating back over two million years ago, glaciation advancing and retreating repeatedly scoured the landscape leaving deposits of rock debris. The U-shaped cross section of the river valleys is a result of recent glaciation. Uplift and faulting in combination with glaciation have been the dominant processes which have created the tall peaks and deep valleys of the North Cascades area.

== Climate ==
Portal Peak is located in the marine west coast climate zone of western North America. Most weather fronts originating in the Pacific Ocean travel northeast toward the Cascade Mountains. As fronts approach the North Cascades, they are forced upward by the peaks of the Cascade Range (orographic lift), causing them to drop their moisture in the form of rain or snowfall onto the Cascades. As a result, the west side of the North Cascades experiences high precipitation, especially during the winter months in the form of snowfall. Because of maritime influence, snow tends to be wet and heavy, resulting in high avalanche danger. During winter months, weather is usually cloudy, but due to high pressure systems over the Pacific Ocean that intensify during summer months, there is often little or no cloud cover during the summer. Due to its temperate climate and proximity to the Pacific Ocean, areas west of the Cascade Crest very rarely experience temperatures below 0 °F (−18 °C) or above 80 °F (27 °C).

== See also ==
- List of mountain peaks of Washington (state)
- Geography of the North Cascades
