= Mount Howard (Washington) =

Mountain in Washington (state), United States

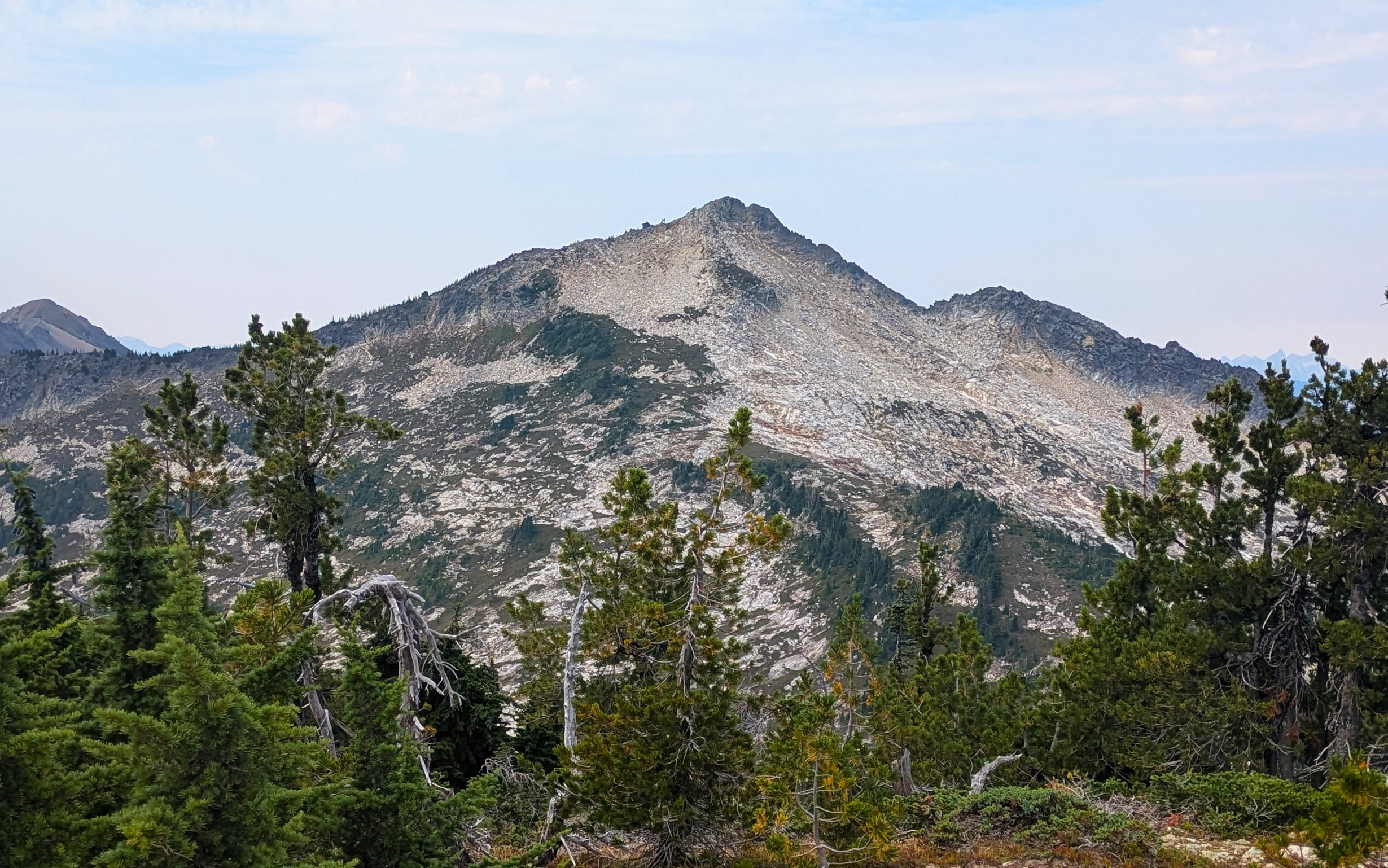
- East aspect

Highest point
- Elevation: 7,063 ft (2,153 m)
- Prominence: 2,903 ft (885 m)
- Parent peak: Whittier Peak (7,281 ft)
- Isolation: 5.56 mi (8.95 km)
- Coordinates: 47°48′52″N 120°57′17″W

Geography
- Location within Washington (state) Location within the United States
- Interactive map of Mount Howard
- Country: United States
- State: Washington
- County: Chelan
- Parent range: North Cascades; Cascade Range
- Topo map: USGS Mount Howard

Geology
- Rock age: Late Cretaceous
- Rock type: Migmatitic Gneiss

Climbing
- Easiest route: scrambling South slope

Mount Howard is a prominent 7,063 feet (2,153 m) mountain summit located west of Lake Wenatchee in Chelan County of Washington state. Mount Howard is the highest point of Nason Ridge, and is 1.37 mi (2.20 km) northeast of Rock Mountain, which is second-highest. This peak is set approximately midway between Stevens Pass and Lake Wenatchee, on land managed by the Okanogan–Wenatchee National Forest. Precipitation runoff from the peak drains into tributaries of the Wenatchee River. The mountain may have been named by a survey party, and first published in 1887.

== Geology ==
The North Cascades features some of the most rugged topography in the Cascade Range with craggy peaks, ridges, and deep glacial valleys. Geological events occurring many years ago created the diverse topography and drastic elevation changes over the Cascade Range leading to various climate differences.

The history of the formation of the Cascade Mountains dates back millions of years ago to the late Eocene Epoch. With the North American Plate overriding the Pacific Plate, episodes of volcanic igneous activity persisted. Glacier Peak, a stratovolcano that is 22 mi (35 km) north of Mt. Howard, began forming in the mid-Pleistocene. In addition, small fragments of the oceanic and continental lithosphere called terranes created the North Cascades about 50 million years ago. Gneissic rock of the Nason Terrane is exposed on Mt. Howard.

During the Pleistocene period dating back over two million years ago, glaciation advancing and retreating repeatedly scoured and shaped the landscape. Glaciation was most prevalent approximately 18,000 years ago, and most valleys were ice-free by 12,000 years ago. Uplift and faulting in combination with glaciation have been the dominant processes which have created the tall peaks and deep valleys of the North Cascades area.

== Climate ==
Lying east of the Cascade crest, the area around Mt. Howard is a bit drier than areas to the west. Summers can bring warm temperatures and occasional thunderstorms. Weather fronts originating in the Pacific Ocean travel east toward the Cascade Mountains. As fronts approach, they are forced upward by the peaks of the Cascade Range, causing them to drop their moisture in the form of rain or snow onto the Cascades (Orographic lift). As a result, the western slopes of the Cascades experience high precipitation, especially during the winter months in the form of snowfall. During winter months, weather is usually cloudy, but due to high pressure systems over the Pacific Ocean that intensify during summer months, there is often little or no cloud cover during the summer.

== Gallery ==
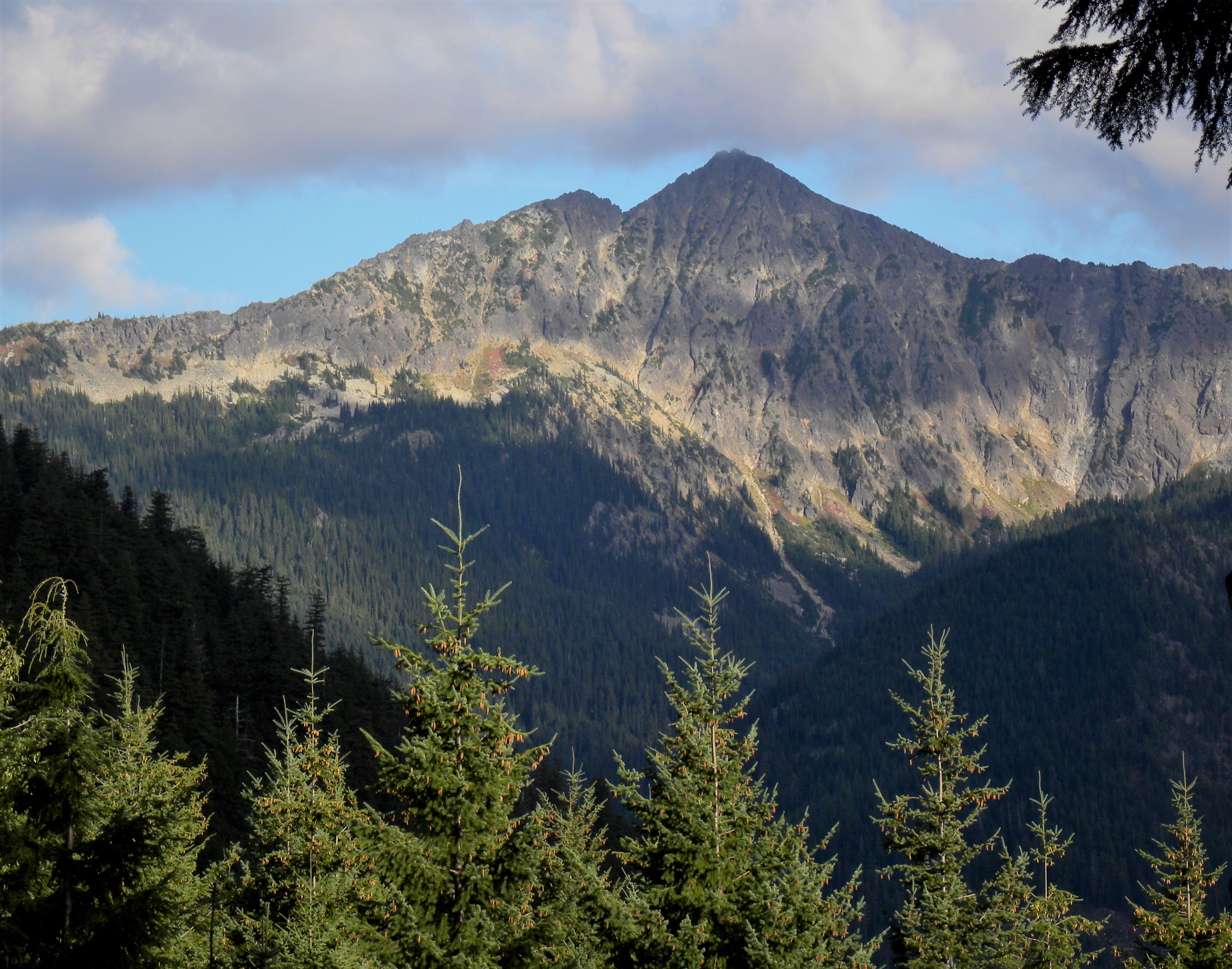
Howard's west aspect

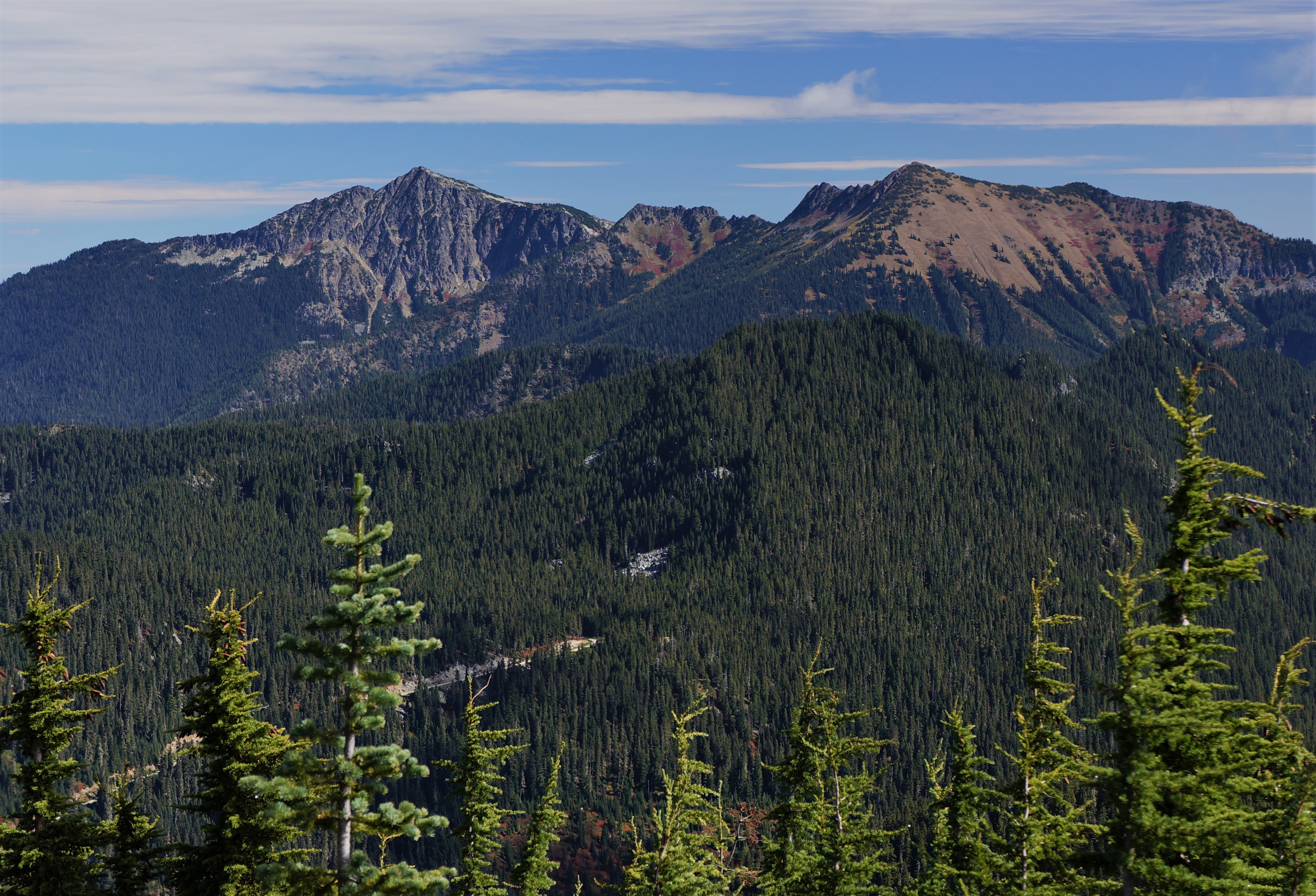
Mt. Howard left, Rock Mountain right, from the west

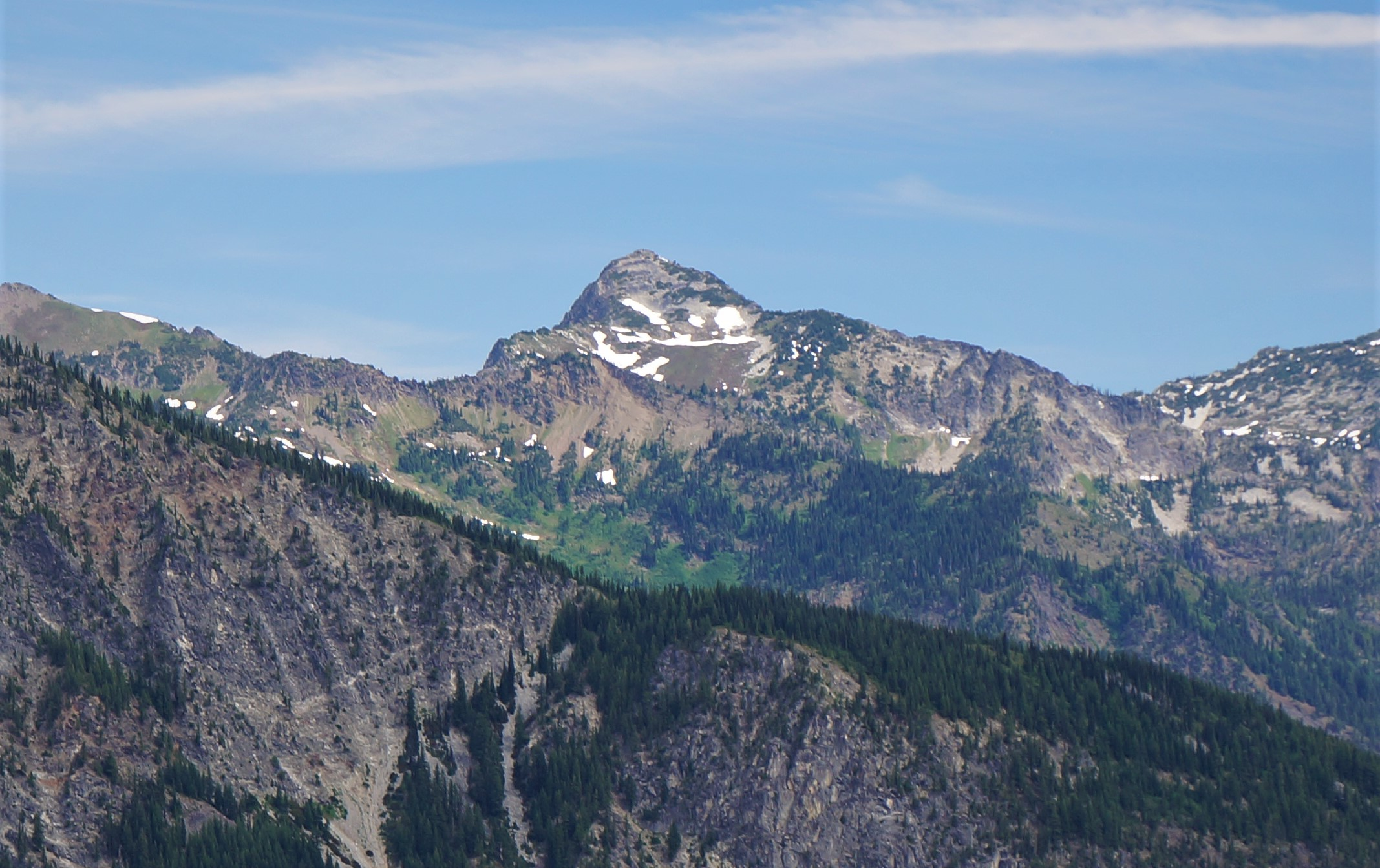
Distant view from south

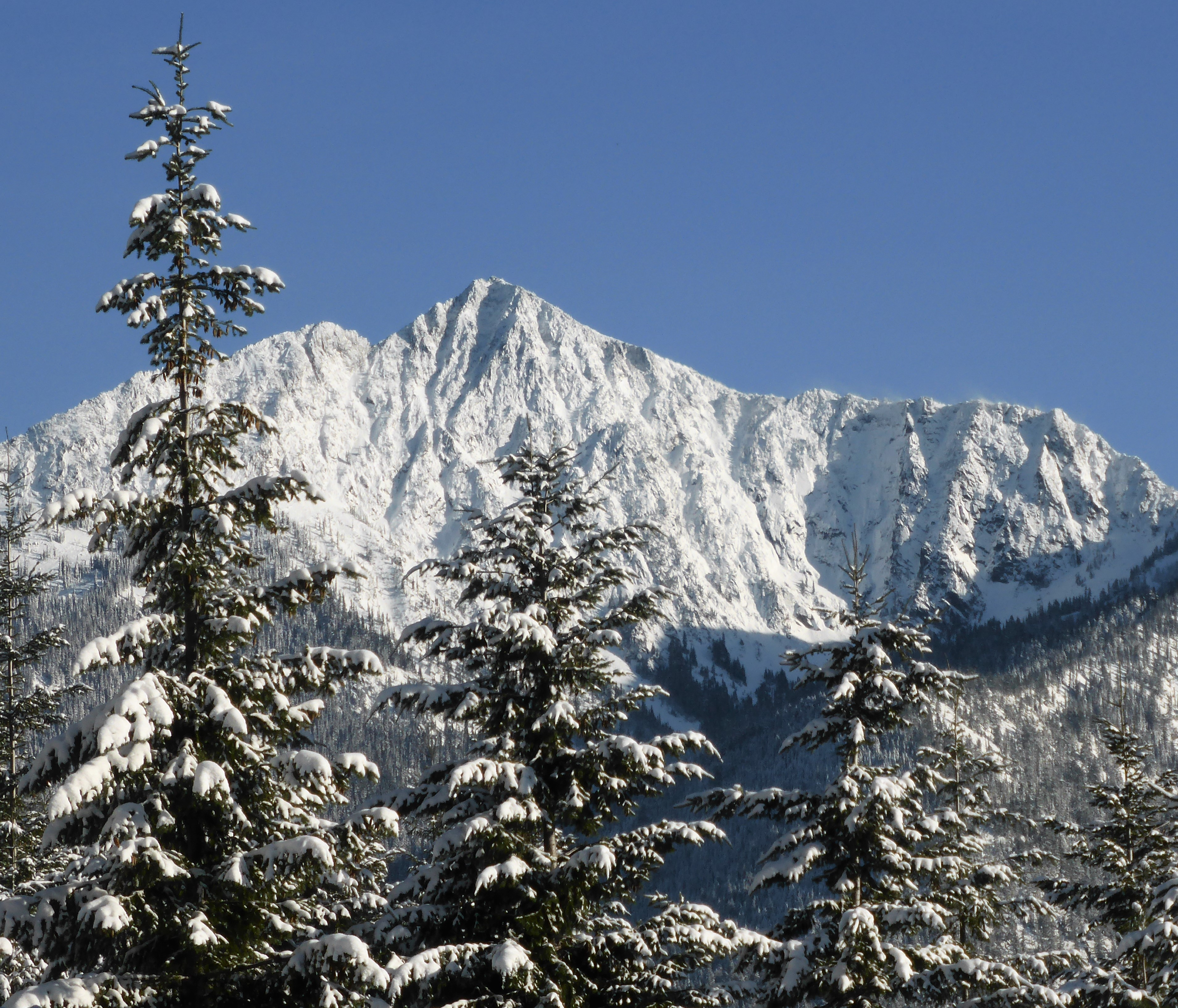
West aspect

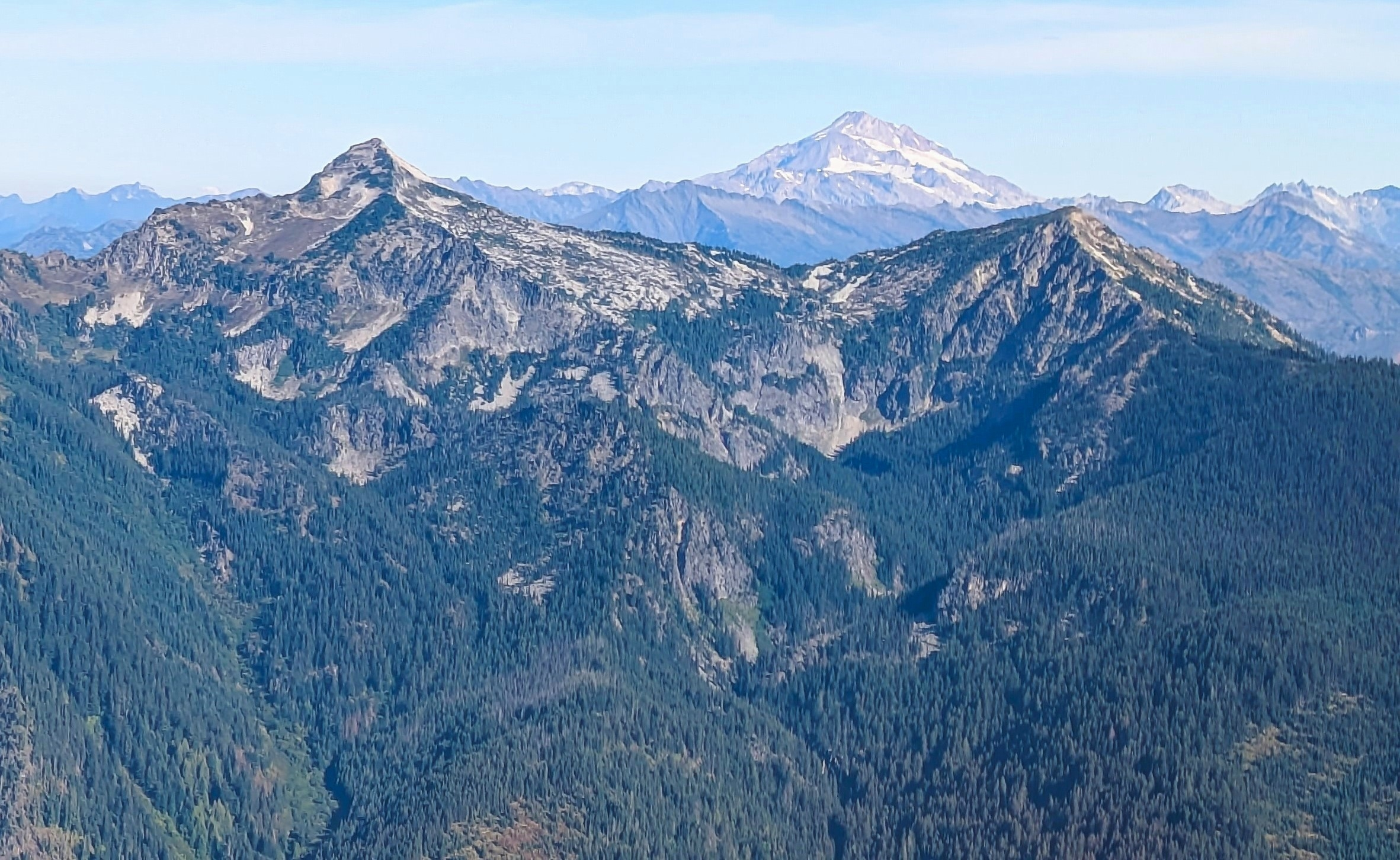
Mount Howard (left) and Mount Mastiff (right) from south, with Glacier Peak in the distance

== See also ==
- Geology of the Pacific Northwest
- Geography of the North Cascades
