= Coles Corner, Washington =

- Unincorporated community
- Location within the state of Washington
- Coordinates: 47°45′22″N 120°44′21″W
- Country: United States
- State: Washington
- County: Chelan
- Elevation: 1,995 ft (608 m)
- Time zone: UTC-8 (Pacific (PST))
  - Summer (DST): UTC-7 (PDT)
- ZIP codes: 98826
- GNIS feature ID: 1517958

Coles Corner is a small unincorporated community in Chelan County, Washington, United States. It is located on Highway 2 east of Stevens Pass in the Cascade Mountains, at the junction for SR 207. It is just north of the town of Winton.

Coles Corner primarily services travelers along Route 2, with a motel, a gas station, and the 59er Diner, a 1950s-style diner.
