= Harding Mountain =

Mountain in Washington (state), United States

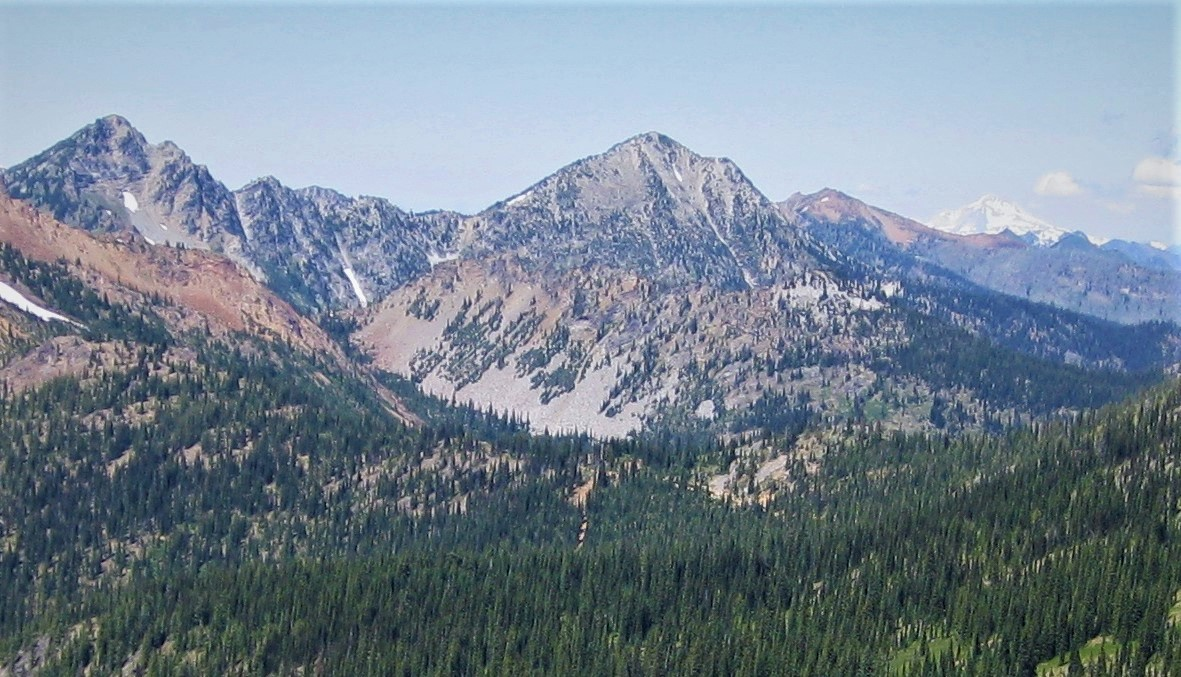
- Harding Mountain centered, south aspect (Solomon Mountain to left)

Highest point
- Elevation: 7,173 ft (2,186 m)
- Prominence: 1,253 ft (382 m)
- Parent peak: Ingalls Peak (7,662 ft)
- Isolation: 3.0 mi (4.8 km)
- Coordinates: 47°31′41″N 120°59′09″W

Geography
- Location within Washington (state) Location within the United States
- Location: Chelan County; Washington, U.S.
- Parent range: Wenatchee Mountains; Cascade Range
- Topo map: USGS Jack Ridge

Geology
- Rock age: Late Cretaceous
- Rock type: granodiorite

Climbing
- Easiest route: class 2 scrambling Southeast slope

Harding Mountain is a 7,173 ft (2,190 m) mountain summit located in Chelan County of Washington state. It is the seventh-highest point in the North Wenatchee Mountains. Harding Mountain is situated within the Alpine Lakes Wilderness, 5.35 mi (8.61 km) northwest of Mount Stuart, and 4.1 mi (6.6 km) west of Eightmile Mountain, on land managed by Wenatchee National Forest. Precipitation runoff from the peak drains into tributaries of Icicle Creek, which in turn is a tributary of the Wenatchee River. This mountain was named after President Warren G. Harding by Albert Hale Sylvester.

== Climate ==
Lying east of the Cascade crest, the area around Harding Mountain is a bit drier than areas to the west. Summers can bring warm temperatures and occasional thunderstorms. Most weather fronts originate in the Pacific Ocean, and travel east toward the Cascade Mountains. As fronts approach, they are forced upward by the peaks of the Cascade Range, causing them to drop their moisture in the form of rain or snowfall onto the Cascades (Orographic lift). As a result, the eastern slopes of the Cascades experience lower precipitation than the western slopes. During winter months, weather is usually cloudy, but, due to high-pressure systems over the Pacific Ocean that intensify during summer months, there is often little or no cloud cover during the summer.

== Geology ==
The Alpine Lakes Wilderness features some of the most rugged topography in the Cascade Range with craggy peaks and ridges, deep glacial valleys, and granite walls spotted with over 700 mountain lakes. Geological events occurring many years ago created the diverse topography and drastic elevation changes over the Cascade Range leading to the various climate differences.

The history of the formation of the Cascade Mountains dates back millions of years ago to the late Eocene Epoch. With the North American Plate overriding the Pacific Plate, episodes of volcanic igneous activity persisted. In addition, small fragments of the oceanic and continental lithosphere called terranes created the North Cascades about 50 million years ago. Harding Mountain is part of the Mount Stuart batholith.

During the Pleistocene period dating back over two million years ago, glaciation advancing and retreating repeatedly scoured the landscape leaving deposits of rock debris. The last glacial retreat in the Alpine Lakes area began about 14,000 years ago and was north of the Canada–US border by 10,000 years ago. The U-shaped cross section of the river valleys is a result of that recent glaciation. Uplift and faulting in combination with glaciation have been the dominant processes which have created the tall peaks and deep valleys of the Alpine Lakes Wilderness area.

== See also ==
- List of peaks of the Alpine Lakes Wilderness
- Geology of the Pacific Northwest
