= Rock Mountain (Washington) =

Mountain in Washington (state), United States

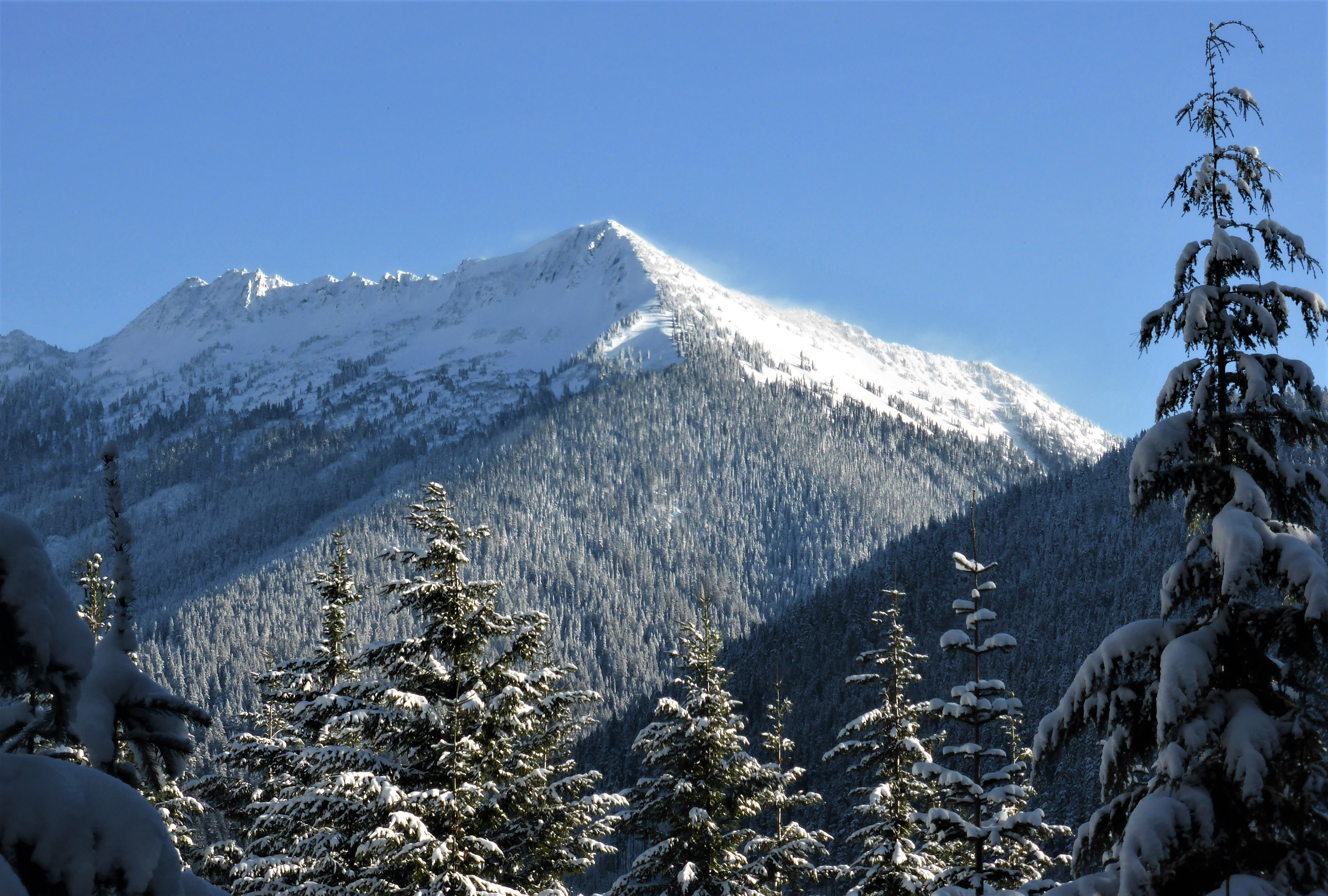
- Northwest aspect

Highest point
- Elevation: 6,840 ft (2,080 m)
- Prominence: 640 ft (200 m)
- Parent peak: Mount Howard (7,063 ft)
- Isolation: 1.37 mi (2.20 km)
- Coordinates: 47°47′59″N 120°58′28″W

Geography
- Location within Washington (state) Location within the United States
- Interactive map of Rock Mountain
- Country: United States
- State: Washington
- County: Chelan
- Parent range: North Cascades; Cascade Range
- Topo map: USGS Mount Howard

Climbing
- Easiest route: Hiking trail

Rock Mountain is a 6,840+ ft (2,080+ m) mountain summit located 6.3 mi (10.1 km) northeast of Stevens Pass in Chelan County of Washington state. This peak is situated north of U.S. Highway 2, approximately midway between Stevens Pass and Lake Wenatchee, on land managed by the Okanogan–Wenatchee National Forest. Rock Mountain is the second-highest point on Nason Ridge, following Mount Howard, 1.37 mi (2.20 km) to the northeast. Rock Mountain was named by Albert Hale Sylvester. Precipitation runoff from the peak drains into tributaries of the Wenatchee River.

== Geology ==
The North Cascades features some of the most rugged topography in the Cascade Range with craggy peaks, ridges, and deep glacial valleys. Geological events occurring many years ago created the diverse topography and drastic elevation changes over the Cascade Range leading to various climate differences.

The history of the formation of the Cascade Mountains dates back millions of years ago to the late Eocene Epoch. With the North American Plate overriding the Pacific Plate, episodes of volcanic igneous activity persisted. Glacier Peak, a stratovolcano that is 22.5 mi (36.2 km) north of Rock Mountain, began forming in the mid-Pleistocene. In addition, small fragments of the oceanic and continental lithosphere called terranes created the North Cascades about 50 million years ago.

During the Pleistocene period dating back over two million years ago, glaciation advancing and retreating repeatedly scoured and shaped the landscape. Glaciation was most prevalent approximately 18,000 years ago, and most valleys were ice-free by 12,000 years ago. Uplift and faulting in combination with glaciation have been the dominant processes which have created the tall peaks and deep valleys of the North Cascades area.

== Climate ==
Lying east of the Cascade crest, the area around Rock Mountain is a bit drier than areas to the west. Summers can bring warm temperatures and occasional thunderstorms. Weather fronts originating in the Pacific Ocean travel east toward the Cascade Mountains. As fronts approach, they are forced upward by the peaks of the Cascade Range, causing them to drop their moisture in the form of rain or snow onto the Cascades (Orographic lift). As a result, the western slopes of the Cascades experience high precipitation, especially during the winter months in the form of snowfall. During winter months, weather is usually cloudy, but due to high pressure systems over the Pacific Ocean that intensify during summer months, there is often little or no cloud cover during the summer.

== Gallery ==
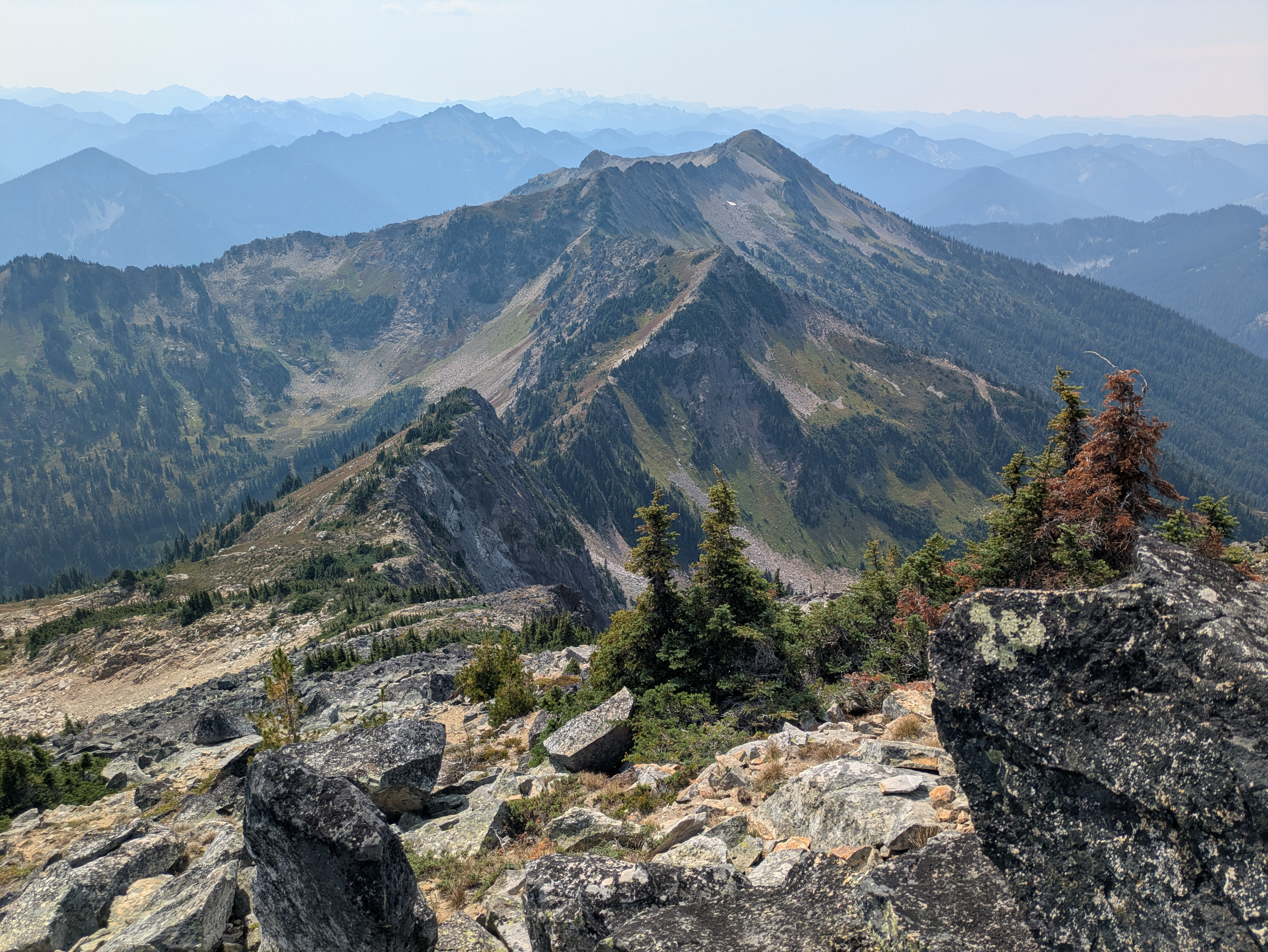
Rock Mountain from Mount Howard

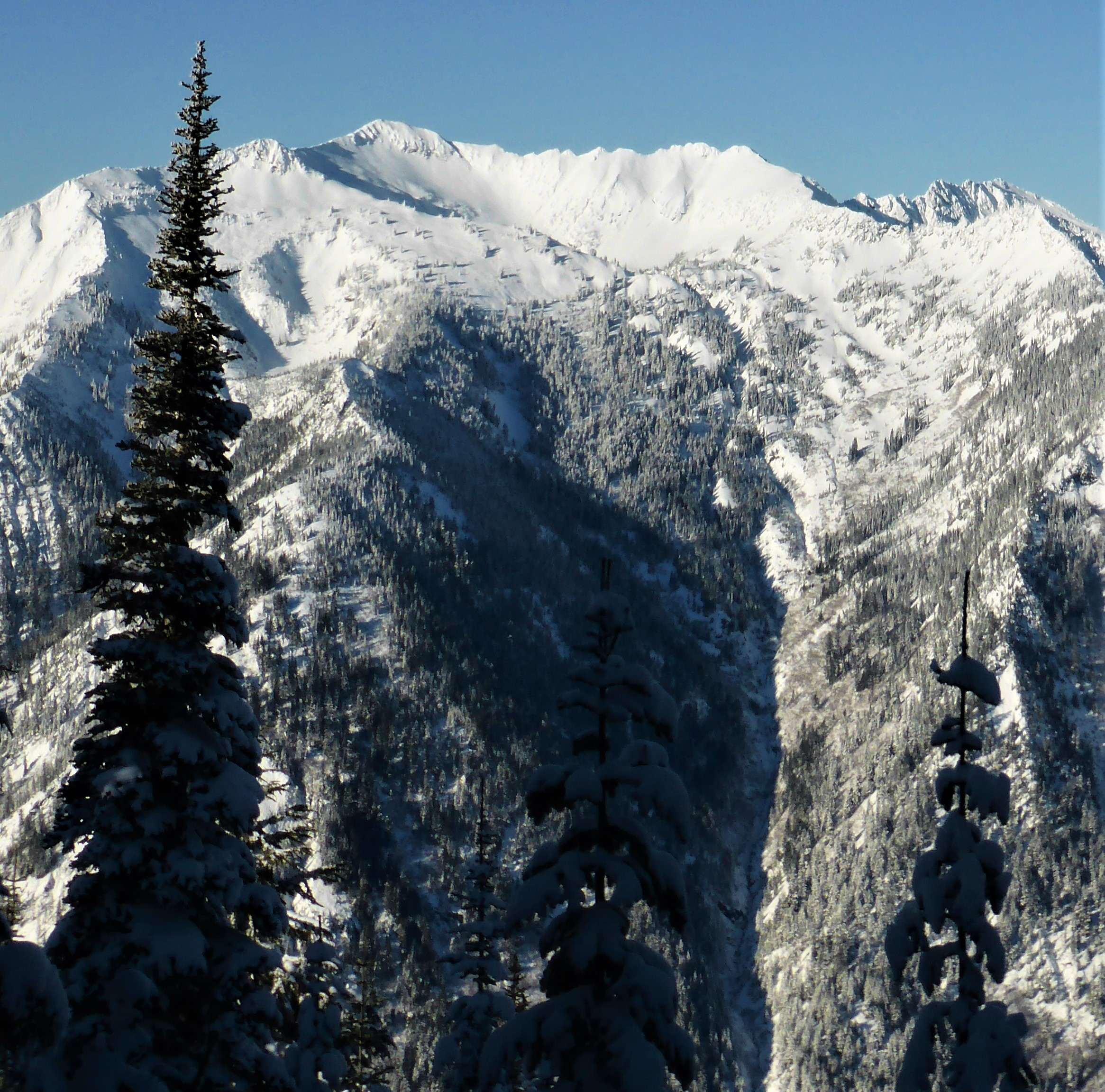
Southeast aspect

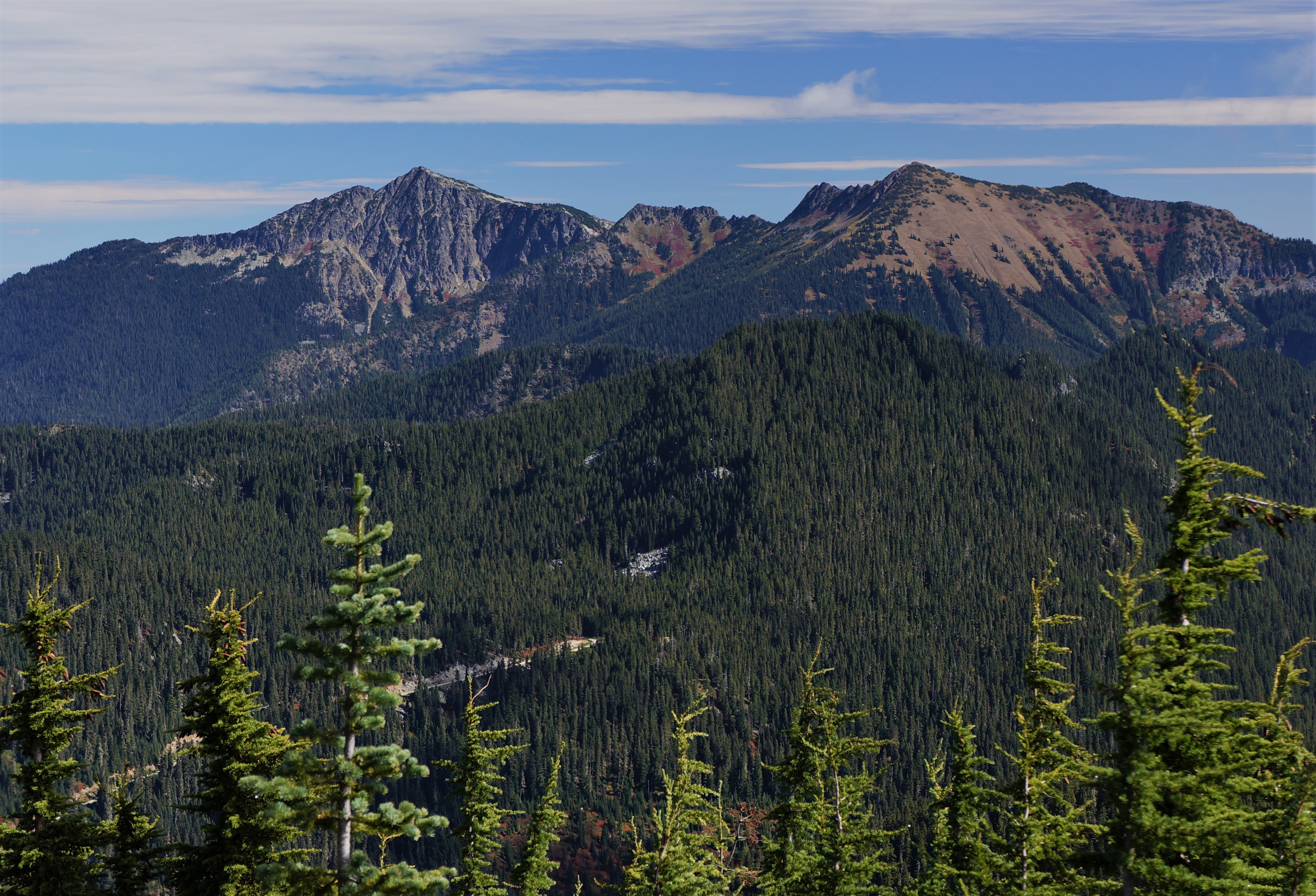
Mt. Howard (left) and Rock Mountain (right) in this view looking east from Mt. McCausland

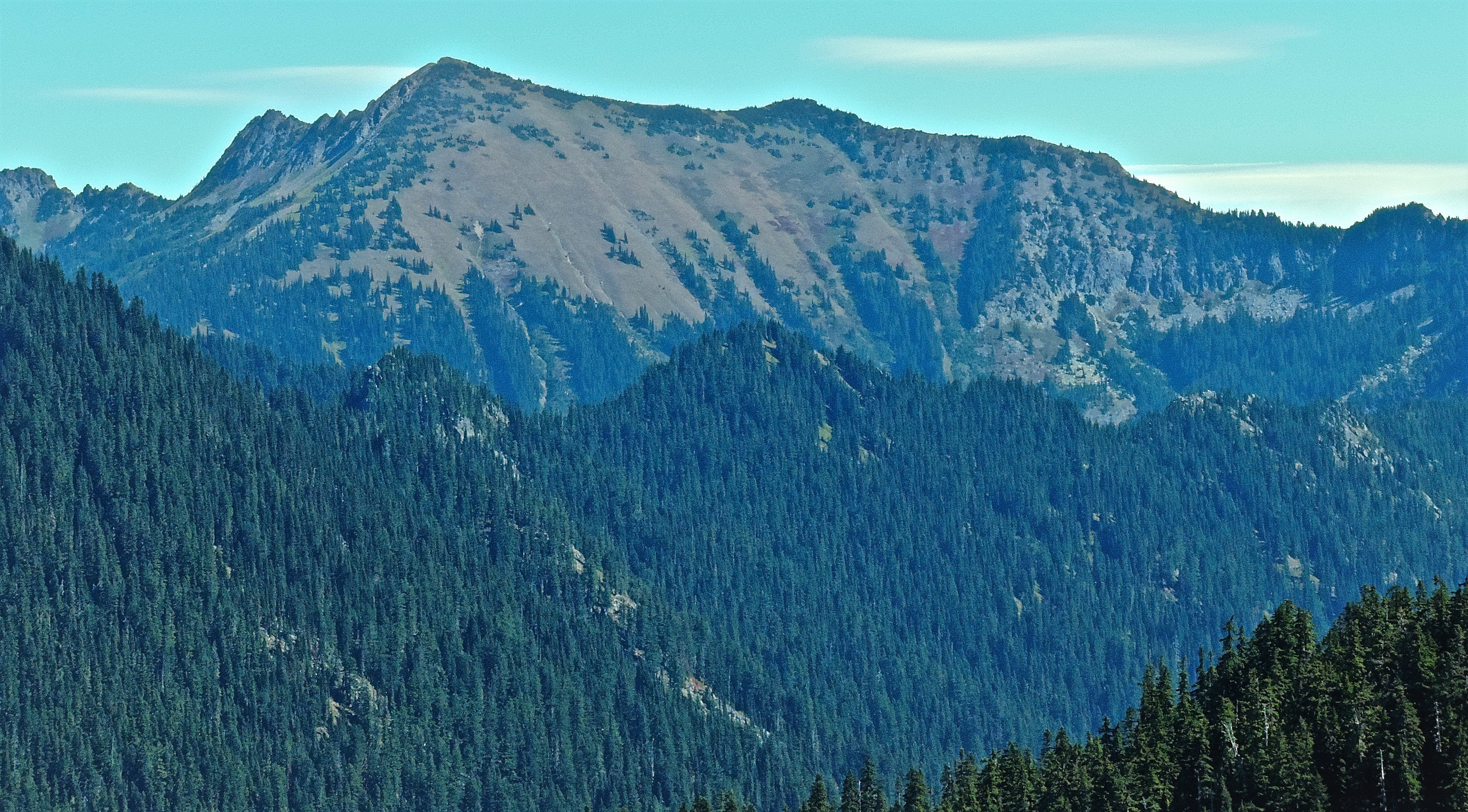
West aspect

== See also ==
- Geology of the Pacific Northwest
- Geography of the North Cascades
