= White River (Lake Wenatchee) =

Location
- Country: United States
- State: Washington
- County: Chelan

Physical characteristics
- Source: White Pass
  - location: Cascade Range, Wenatchee National Forest
  - coordinates: 48°2′19″N 121°8′43″W
  - elevation: 5,959 ft (1,816 m)
- Mouth: Lake Wenatchee
  - location: Telma
  - coordinates: 47°50′1″N 120°48′51″W
  - elevation: 1,873 ft (571 m)
- Length: 32 mi (51 km)

The White River is a river in the U.S. state of Washington. It is the northern and larger of the two rivers that flow into the west end of Lake Wenatchee. The smaller southern one is the Little Wenatchee River. The White River is part of the Columbia River basin, being a tributary of the Wenatchee River, which empties into the Columbia River. A large number of place names in the White River basin, including the river's name itself, were given by Albert H. Sylvester.

== Course ==
The White River originates at White Pass, the pass separating the White River headwaters from the headwaters of the North Fork Sauk River, and flows east until its confluence with Thunder Creek. From there the river flows southeast all the way to its mouth at the far end of Lake Wenatchee. About halfway from Thunder Creek to its mouth, the river drops over impressive White River Falls and shortly below that, receives the waters of the remote Napeequa River.

== Tributaries ==
- Foam Creek
- Lightning Creek
- Amber Creek
- Thunder Creek
- Indian Creek
- Panther Creek
- Napeequa River
- Canyon Creek
- Sears Creek
- Siverly Creek

== See also ==
- List of rivers of Washington (state)
- Tributaries of the Columbia River
