= Lake Wenatchee State Airport =

- IATA: none; ICAO: none; FAA LID: 27W

Summary
- Airport type: Public
- Owner: WSDOT Aviation Division
- Serves: Leavenworth, Washington
- Elevation AMSL: 1,939 ft / 591 m
- Coordinates: 47°49′10″N 120°43′12″W
- Interactive map of Lake Wenatchee State Airport

Runways
Direction	Length		Surface
Direction	ft	m	Surface
9/27	2,473	754	Turf

Statistics (2007)
- Aircraft operations: 600
- Source: Federal Aviation Administration

Lake Wenatchee State Airport (FAA LID: 27W) is a public use airport located 14 nautical miles (26 km) northwest of the central business district of Leavenworth, a city in Chelan County, Washington, United States. It is owned by the Washington State Department of Transportation's Aviation Division.

The airport is located next to Lake Wenatchee State Park with 197 campsites. Outdoor toilets and space for camping are also available at the airport. Fishing, water recreation, and hiking are available at the nearby lakes.

== Facilities and aircraft ==
Lake Wenatchee State Airport covers an area of 35 acres (14 ha). The 2,473-foot (754 m) turf runway has a 100-foot (30 m) wide center strip outlined with reflectors. Field elevation is 1,939 feet (591 m) above mean sea level and some density altitude problems can be anticipated on hot summer days.

For the 12-month period ending May 30, 2012, the airport had 600 general aviation aircraft operations, an average of 50 per month.

== See also ==
- List of airports in Washington
