= Dishpan Gap =

Cinder cone in Washington, US

Coordinates: 47.9768°N 121.1487°W

Dishpan Gap is a cinder cone in Chelan County of Washington, US. Located near Glacier Peak and White Chuck Cinder Cone, its elevation is approximately 5,600 ft (1,707 m).

Known for his creative naming of natural features in the Cascade Range, forest supervisor Albert Hale Sylvester named Dishpan Gap for the presence of an "old rusty dishpan discarded by some previous camper".
