= Lake Wenatchee State Park =

State park in Washington, United States

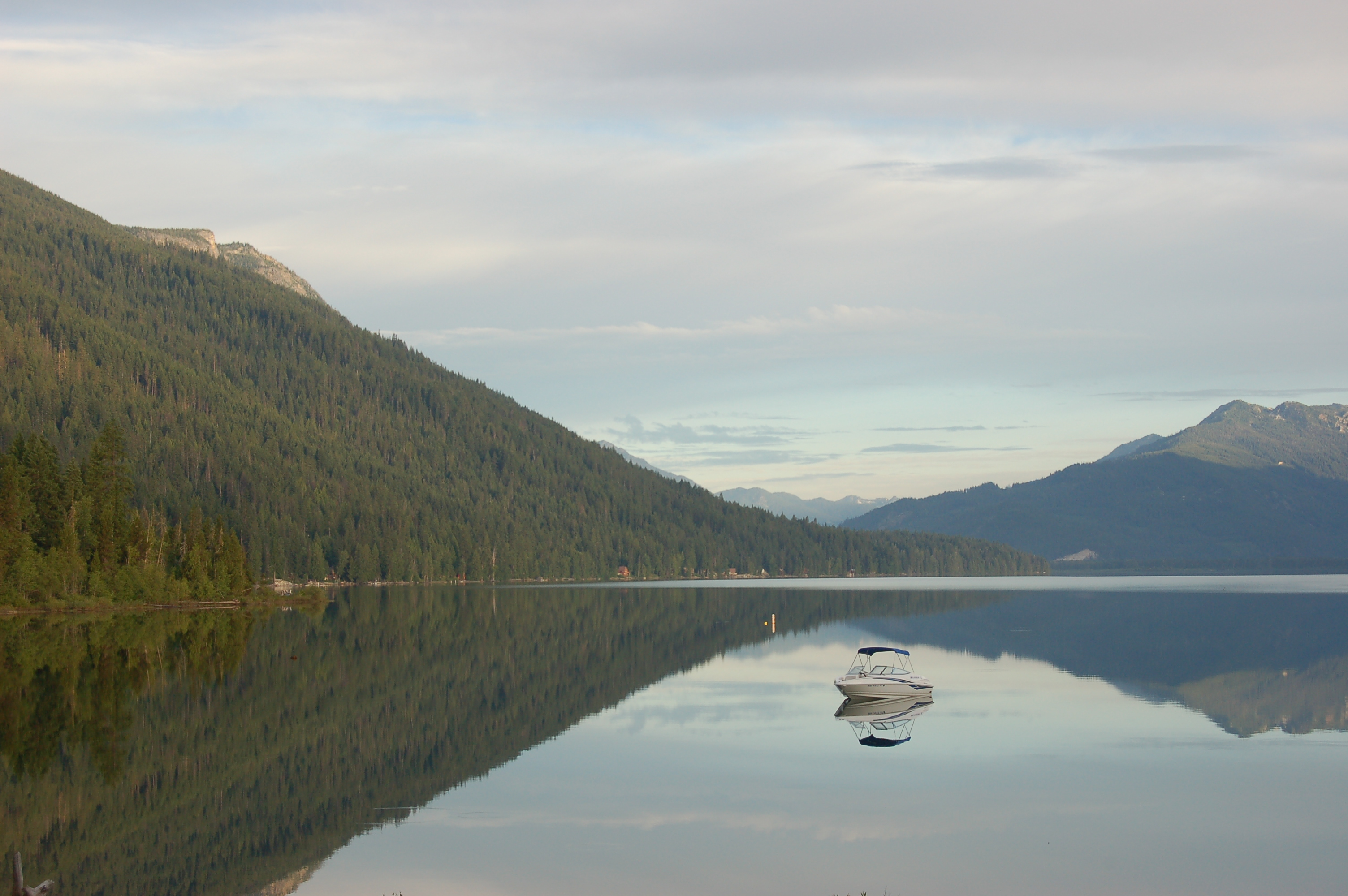

- Location within Washington (state) Location within the United States
- Location: Chelan County, Washington, United States
- Coordinates: 47°48′31″N 120°43′48″W
- Area: 492 acres (199 ha)
- Elevation: 1,873 ft (571 m)
- Established: 1930
- Administrator: Washington State Parks and Recreation Commission
- Website: Official website

Lake Wenatchee State Park is a public recreation area located at the eastern end of Lake Wenatchee, a glacier- and snowmelt-fed lake in the Wenatchee National Forest on the eastern slopes of the Cascades Mountain Range in the state of Washington. The state park covers 492 acres (199 ha) split into two parts—the north shore park and the south shore park—separated by the Wenatchee River. The park is managed by the Washington State Parks and Recreation Commission.

== Activities and amenities ==
The park offers 12,623 feet (3,847 m) of waterfront, a variety of fresh water activities, including fishing, water skiing, white-water kayaking, windsurfing, swimming, and facilities to launch motorboats and personal water craft. The park has camping facilities and trails for hikers, bikers, and equestrians as well as areas for rock climbing. In the winter months, the park is used for cross-country skiing, dog sledding, snowmobiling, and ice climbing.
