= Little Wenatchee River =

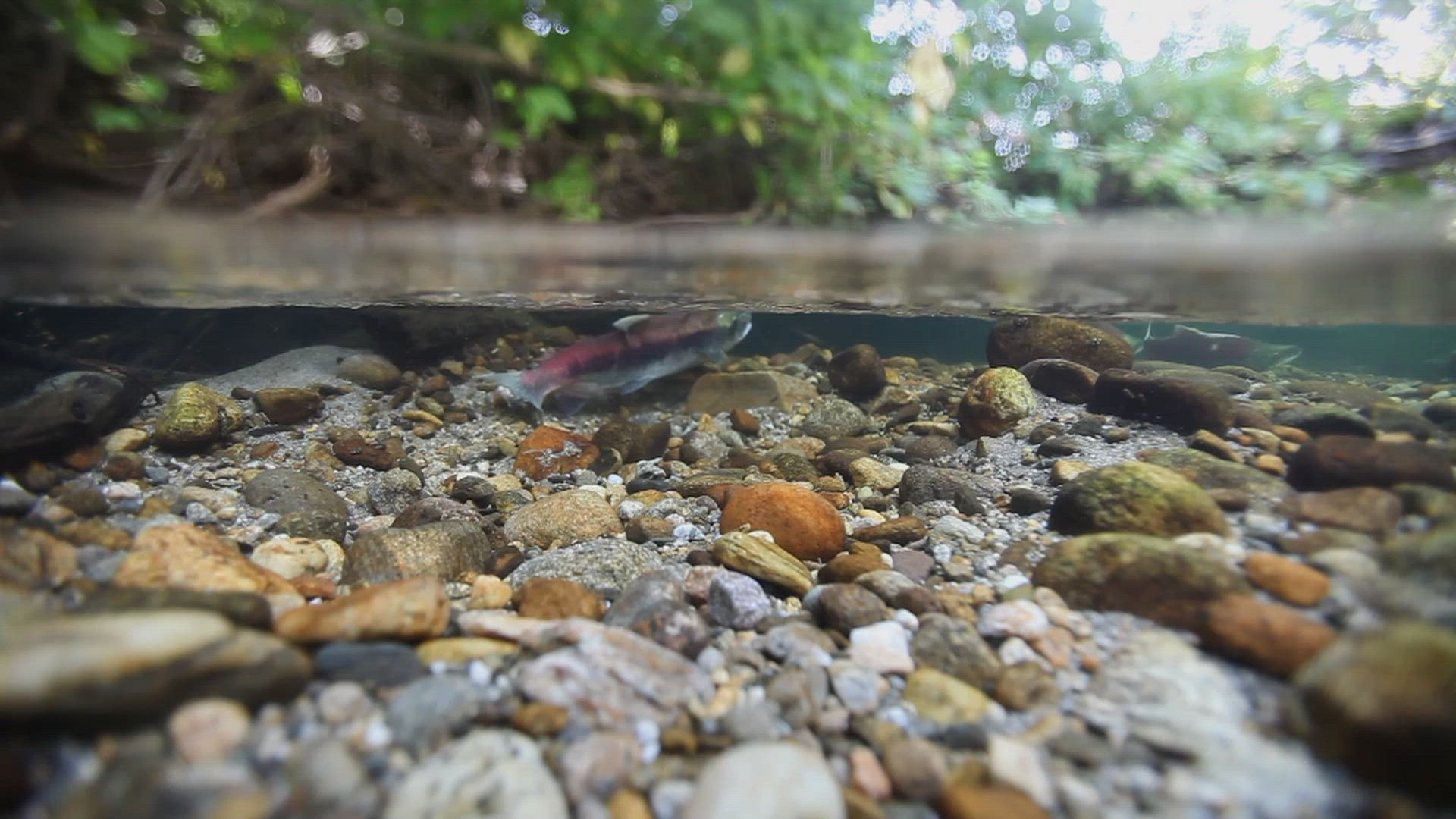
- An adult sockeye salmon swims in the Little Wenatchee River shortly after spawning in August of 2014.

- Location of the mouth of the Little Wenatchee River in Washington Little Wenatchee River (the United States)
- Etymology: Sahaptin word meaning "river issuing from a canyon"

Location
- Country: United States
- State: Washington
- County: Chelan

Physical characteristics
- Source: Cascade Range
  - location: Dishpan Gap, Wenatchee National Forest
  - coordinates: 47°58′19″N 121°08′45″W
  - elevation: 5,580 m (18,310 ft)
- Mouth: Lake Wenatchee
  - location: South of Telma
  - coordinates: 47°49′38″N 120°49′07″W
  - elevation: 1,873 m (6,145 ft)

The Little Wenatchee River is the southern and smaller of the two rivers that flow into the west end of Lake Wenatchee. The northern and larger one is the White River. A large number of place names in the Little Wenatchee River basin, including the river's name itself, were given by Albert H. Sylvester.

The Little Wenatchee River begins at Dishpan Gap, a pass between the headwaters of the Little Wenatchee River and North Fork Skykomish River. The river flows southeast for a bit before turning south until its confluence with Cady Creek. From there it continues to flow southeast all the way to Lake Wenatchee.

At Little Wenatchee Falls, the river drops about 60 feet (18 m) in a series of cascades.

== Recreation ==
For part of its 7.2-mile (11.6 km) length, the Little Wenatchee Trail follows the river. The trail runs from a trailhead at the end Little Wenatchee River Road to the Pacific Crest Trail. The Little Wenatchee Ford Trailhead also provides access to Cady Creek Trail, Cady Ridge Trail, and Poe Mountain Trail.

Soda Springs Campground, 9 miles (14 km) from Lake Wenatchee, has 5 campsites and a vault toilet. There is a natural soda spring here that bubbles cool mineral water up from underground. It is not entirely clear if the water is safe for consumption. Lake Creek Campground is along the Little Wenatchee 11 miles (18 km) upstream of Lake Wenatchee. The campground consists of 7 sites spread under an open but shady section of forest a short walk from the river. There are 2 pit toilets but no other amenities. A short loop trail leaves from the campground and follows the river for a ways leading you past two beautiful pools for fishing or swimming in hot weather.

== See also ==
- List of Washington rivers
- List of tributaries of the Columbia River
