= Lake Wenatchee =

Lake in Chelan County, Washington, United States

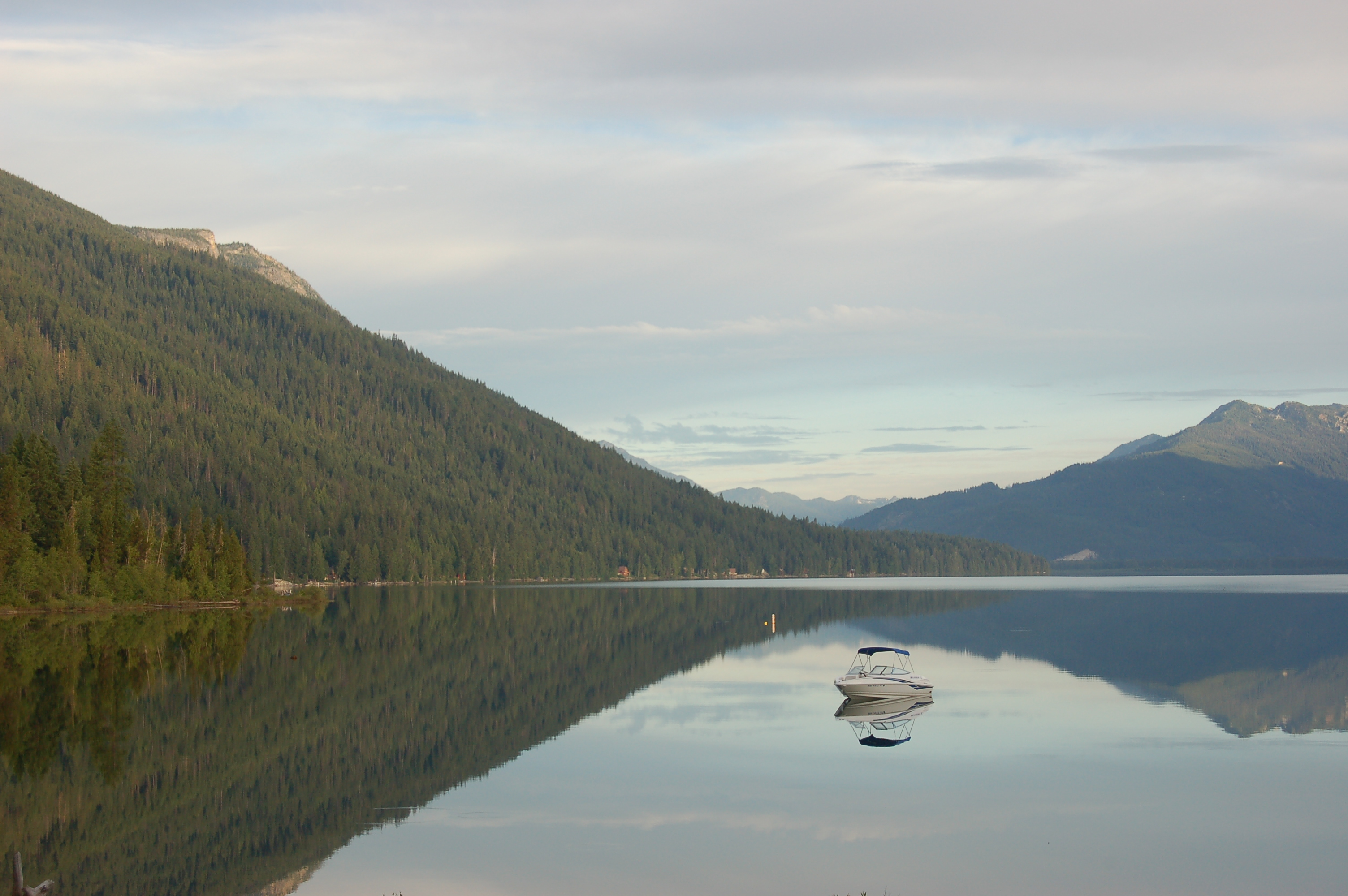

- Location within Washington (state) Location within the United States
- Location: Cascade Range, Chelan County, Washington, US (near Leavenworth, Washington)
- Coordinates: 47.822°N 120.772°W
- Primary inflows: White River, Little Wenatchee River
- Primary outflows: Wenatchee River
- Basin countries: United States
- Max. length: 5 mi (8.0 km)
- Surface area: 2,480 acres (1,004 ha)
- Max. depth: 244 ft (74 m)
- Surface elevation: 1,873 ft (571 m)
- Islands: Emerald Island

Lake Wenatchee is a glacier- and snowmelt-fed lake situated in the Wenatchee National Forest on the eastern slopes of the Cascades Mountain Range in the state of Washington. Lake Wenatchee covers 2,480 acres (1,000 ha) and reaches a depth of 244 feet (74 m). Lake Wenatchee is the source of the Wenatchee River. Its main tributaries are the White River and the Little Wenatchee River. At its eastern end, the lake is breasted by Lake Wenatchee State Park. Lake Wenatchee State Airport, an unimproved grass and dirt landing strip, is adjacent to the north side of the state park.

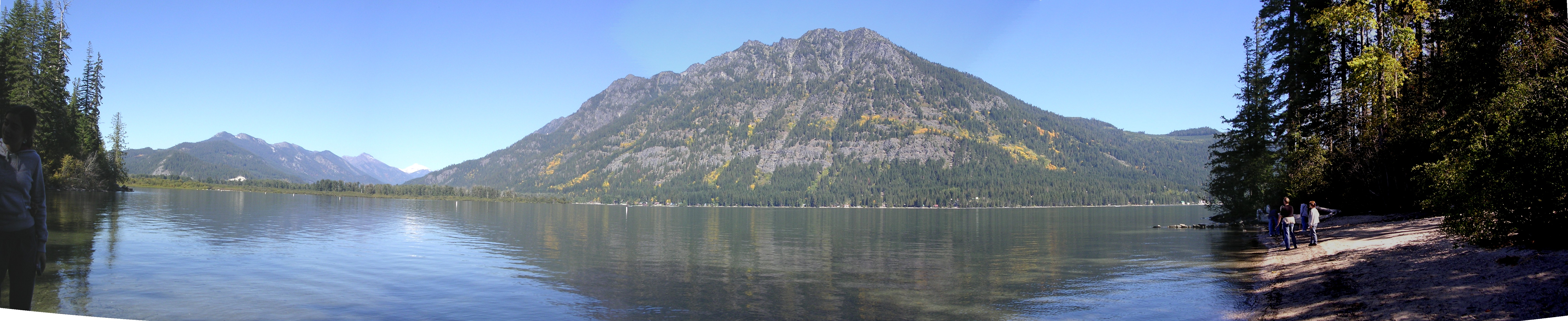
View across Lake Wenatchee to Dirty Face mountain in early spring of 2004
