= Bandit Peak =

Mountain in Washington (state), United States

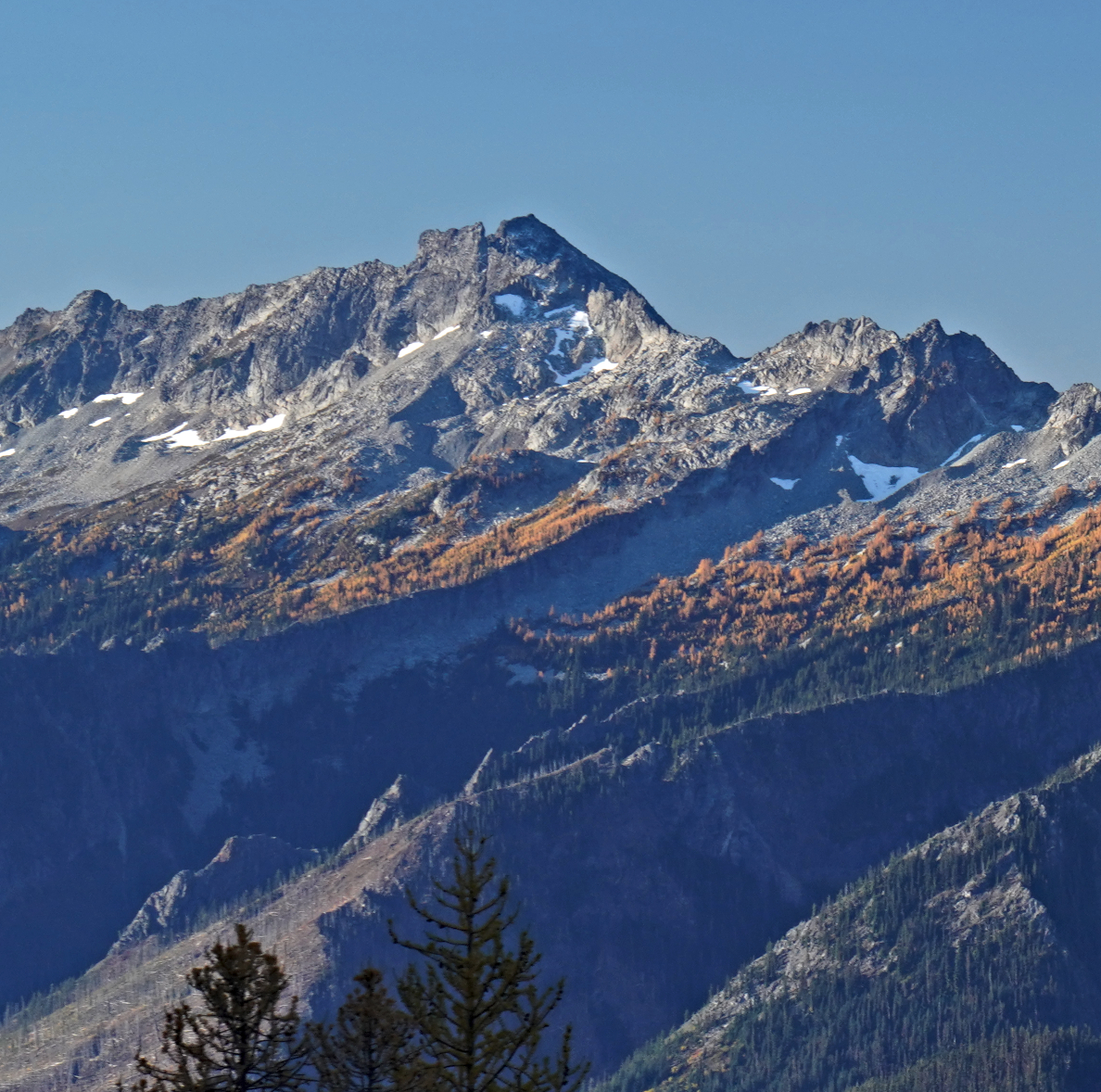
- Bandit Peak, north aspect, from Mount Maude

Highest point
- Elevation: 7,625 ft (2,324 m)
- Prominence: 1,305 ft (398 m)
- Parent peak: Brahma Peak (8,078 ft)
- Isolation: 5.44 mi (8.75 km)
- Coordinates: 47°59′12″N 120°52′19″W

Geography
- Location within Washington (state) Location within the United States
- Interactive map of Bandit Peak
- Country: United States
- State: Washington
- County: Chelan
- Protected area: Glacier Peak Wilderness
- Parent range: North Cascades; Cascade Range
- Topo map: USGS Schaefer Lake

Climbing
- Easiest route: class 4

Bandit Peak is a 7,625-foot (2,324-metre) double-summit granitic mountain located in the Glacier Peak Wilderness of the North Cascades, in Chelan County of Washington state. The mountain is situated east of the crest of the Cascade Range, on land managed by the Okanogan–Wenatchee National Forest. Its nearest higher neighbor is Brahma Peak, 5.9 mi (9.5 km) to the north. Bandit Peak is the ninth-highest peak on Chiwawa Ridge, and other notable peaks on this ridge include Mount Berge, Buck Mountain, Cirque Mountain, Napeequa Peak, Helmet Butte, and Chiwawa Mountain. Precipitation runoff from Bandit Peak drains west into Napeequa River; or east into the Chiwawa River.

== Geology ==
The North Cascades features some of the most rugged topography in the Cascade Range with craggy peaks, ridges, and deep glacial valleys. Geological events occurring many years ago created the diverse topography and drastic elevation changes over the Cascade Range leading to various climate differences.

The history of the formation of the Cascade Mountains dates back millions of years ago to the late Eocene Epoch. With the North American Plate overriding the Pacific Plate, episodes of volcanic igneous activity persisted. In addition, small fragments of the oceanic and continental lithosphere called terranes created the North Cascades about 50 million years ago. During the Pleistocene period dating back over two million years ago, glaciation advancing and retreating repeatedly scoured and shaped the landscape. Glaciation was most prevalent approximately 18,000 years ago, and most valleys were ice-free by 12,000 years ago. Uplift and faulting in combination with glaciation have been the dominant processes which have created the tall peaks and deep valleys of the North Cascades area.

Subduction and tectonic activity in the area began during the late cretaceous period, about 90 million years ago. Extensive volcanic activity began to take place in the oligocene, about 35 million years ago. Glacier Peak, a stratovolcano that is 14.2 mi (22.9 km) northwest of Bandit Peak, began forming in the mid-Pleistocene. Due to Glacier Peak's proximity to Bandit, volcanic ash is common in the area.

== Climate ==
Most weather fronts originating in the Pacific Ocean travel northeast toward the Cascade Mountains. As fronts approach the North Cascades, they are forced upward by the peaks of the Cascade Range (orographic lift), causing them to drop their moisture in the form of rain or snowfall onto the Cascades. As a result, the west side of the North Cascades experiences high precipitation, especially during the winter months in the form of snowfall. Because of maritime influence, snow tends to be wet and heavy, resulting in high avalanche danger. During winter months, weather is usually cloudy, but, due to high pressure systems over the Pacific Ocean that intensify during summer months, there is often little or no cloud cover during the summer.

== See also ==
- Geology of the Pacific Northwest
- Geography of the North Cascades
