= Mount Berge =

Mountain in Washington (state), United States

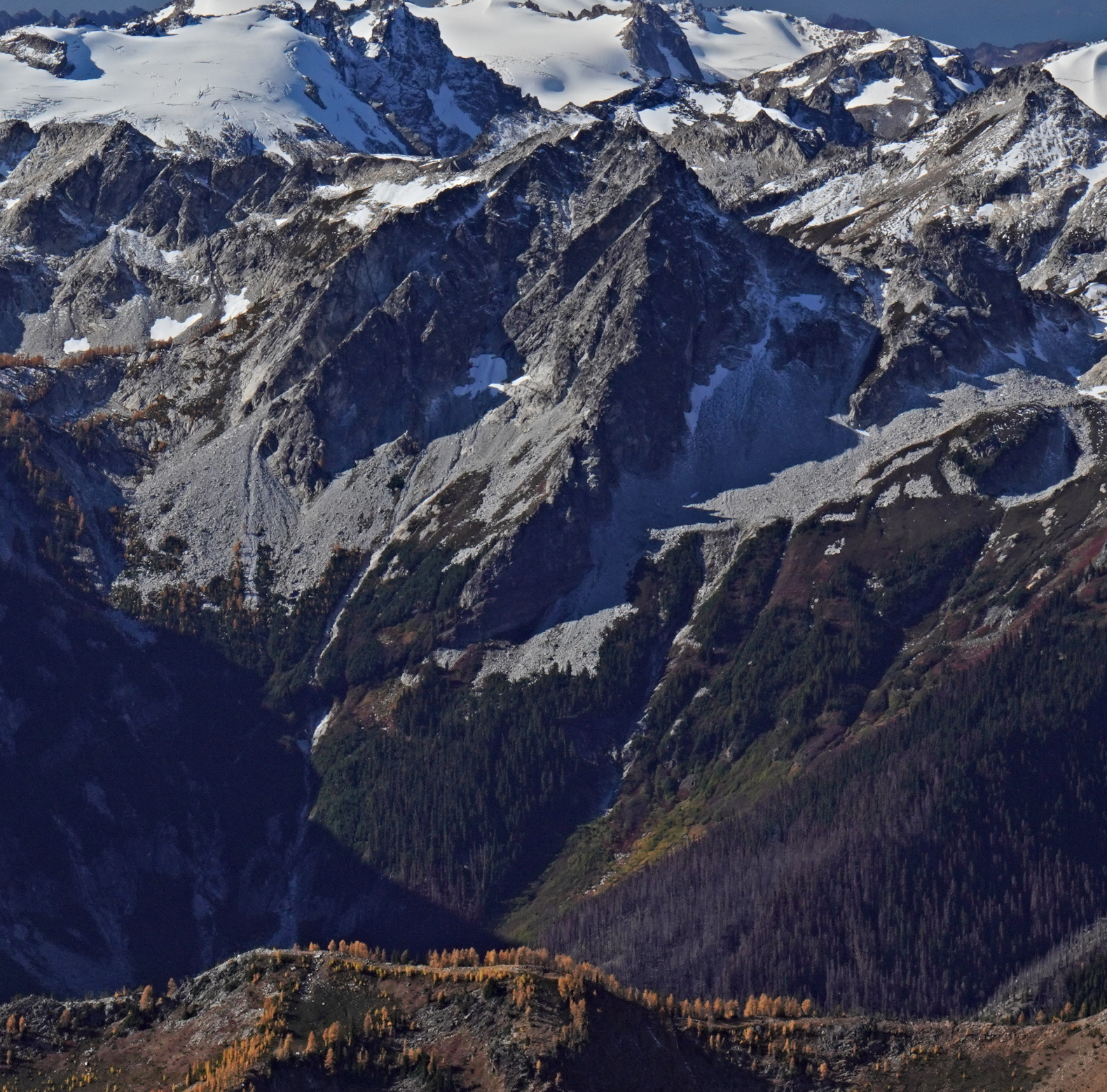
- Mt. Berge, east aspect, from Mount Maude

Highest point
- Elevation: 7,951 ft (2,423 m)
- Prominence: 1,026 ft (313 m)
- Parent peak: Napeequa Peak
- Isolation: 1.36 mi (2.19 km)
- Coordinates: 48°06′12″N 120°56′46″W

Geography
- Location within Washington (state) Location within the United States
- Interactive map of Mount Berge
- Country: United States
- State: Washington
- County: Chelan
- Protected area: Glacier Peak Wilderness
- Parent range: North Cascades; Cascade Range
- Topo map: USGS Clark Mountain

Geology
- Rock age: Cretaceous
- Rock type: Granodiorite

Climbing
- Easiest route: class 3 scrambling

Mount Berge is a 7,951-foot (2,423-metre) double-summit granitic mountain located in the Glacier Peak Wilderness of the North Cascades, in Chelan County of Washington state. The mountain is situated along the crest of the Cascade Range, on land managed by the Okanogan–Wenatchee National Forest. Its nearest higher neighbor is Napeequa Peak, 1.2 mi (1.9 km) to the west, and Buck Mountain is 1.7 mi (2.7 km) to the east-southeast. Berge is positioned on Chiwawa Ridge with Buck and Napeequa, and other notable peaks on this ridge include Fortress Mountain, Brahma Peak, Cirque Mountain, Helmet Butte, and Chiwawa Mountain. Precipitation runoff from Berge drains to the headwaters of Napeequa River; or east into tributaries of the Chiwawa River.

This peak was named to remember Richard Waldo Berge (age 23), who died while climbing Baring Mountain on July 16, 1952. He was climbing with Fred Beckey at the time of the accident. Beckey's Cascade Alpine Guide credits Berge with several first ascents in the Cascades.

== Geology ==
The North Cascades features some of the most rugged topography in the Cascade Range with craggy peaks, ridges, and deep glacial valleys. Geological events occurring many years ago created the diverse topography and drastic elevation changes over the Cascade Range leading to various climate differences.

The history of the formation of the Cascade Mountains dates back millions of years ago to the late Eocene Epoch. With the North American Plate overriding the Pacific Plate, episodes of volcanic igneous activity persisted. In addition, small fragments of the oceanic and continental lithosphere called terranes created the North Cascades about 50 million years ago. During the Pleistocene period dating back over two million years ago, glaciation advancing and retreating repeatedly scoured and shaped the landscape. Glaciation was most prevalent approximately 18,000 years ago, and most valleys were ice-free by 12,000 years ago. Uplift and faulting in combination with glaciation have been the dominant processes which have created the tall peaks and deep valleys of the North Cascades area.

Subduction and tectonic activity in the area began during the late cretaceous period, about 90 million years ago. Extensive volcanic activity began to take place in the oligocene, about 35 million years ago. Glacier Peak, a stratovolcano that is 7.8 mi (12.6 km) west of Mount Berge, began forming in the mid-Pleistocene. Due to Glacier Peak's proximity to Mount Berge, volcanic ash is common in the area.

== Climate ==
Most weather fronts originating in the Pacific Ocean travel northeast toward the Cascade Mountains. As fronts approach the North Cascades, they are forced upward by the peaks of the Cascade Range (orographic lift), causing them to drop their moisture in the form of rain or snowfall onto the Cascades. As a result, the North Cascades experience high precipitation, especially during the winter months in the form of snowfall. Because of maritime influence, snow tends to be wet and heavy, resulting in high avalanche danger. During winter months, weather is usually cloudy, but due to high pressure systems over the Pacific Ocean that intensify during summer months, there is often little or no cloud cover during the summer.

== See also ==
- Geology of the Pacific Northwest
- Geography of the North Cascades
