= Brahma Peak =

Mountain in Washington (state), United States

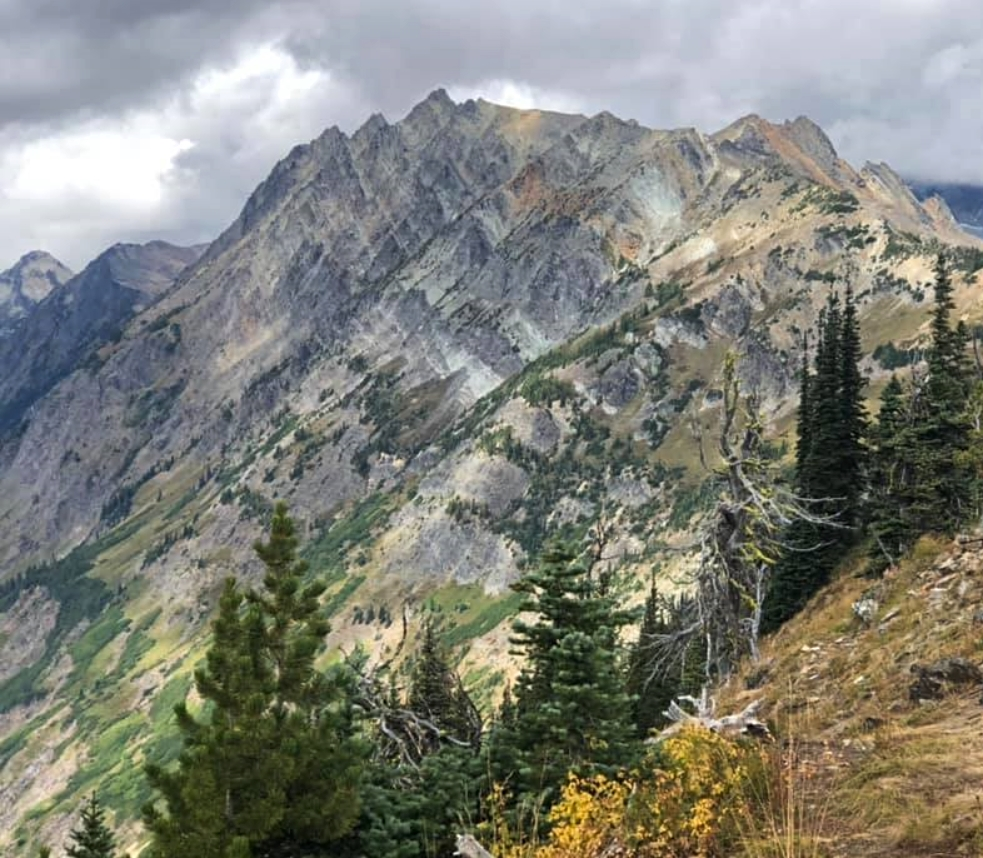
- Southeast aspect, from Little Giant Pass

Highest point
- Elevation: 8,079 ft (2,462 m)
- Prominence: 292 ft (89 m)
- Parent peak: Buck Mountain
- Isolation: 1.67 mi (2.69 km)
- Coordinates: 48°04′04″N 120°54′48″W

Geography
- Location within Washington (state) Location within the United States
- Interactive map of Brahma Peak
- Country: United States
- State: Washington
- County: Chelan
- Protected area: Glacier Peak Wilderness
- Parent range: Cascade Range; North Cascades
- Topo map: USGS Clark Mountain

Geology
- Rock type: Schist

Brahma Peak is a remote 8,079-foot (2,462-metre) mountain summit located on Chiwawa Ridge in the North Cascades, in Chelan County of Washington state. The mountain is situated in the Glacier Peak Wilderness, on land managed by the Wenatchee National Forest. The nearest higher neighbor is Buck Mountain, 1.8 mi (2.9 km) to the north. Brahma and Buck are set on Chiwawa Ridge, and other notable peaks on this ridge include Fortress Mountain, Cirque Mountain, Napeequa Peak, Mount Berge, Bandit Peak, and Chiwawa Mountain. Precipitation runoff from Brahma and meltwater from its glacier remnants drains into Chiwawa River and Napeequa River, both tributaries of the Wenatchee River. Topographic relief is significant since the southwest lavender-colored schist cliffs of this peak rise nearly 4,000 feet above the Napeequa River Valley in approximately one mile.

== Geology ==
The North Cascades feature some of the most rugged topography in the Cascade Range with craggy peaks, spires, ridges, and deep glacial valleys. Geological events occurring many years ago created the diverse topography and drastic elevation changes over the Cascade Range leading to the various climate differences.

The history of the formation of the Cascade Mountains dates back millions of years ago to the late Eocene Epoch. With the North American Plate overriding the Pacific Plate, episodes of volcanic igneous activity persisted. Glacier Peak, a stratovolcano that is 9.8 mi (15.8 km) west-northwest of Brahma Peak, began forming in the mid-Pleistocene. In addition, small fragments of the oceanic and continental lithosphere called terranes created the North Cascades about 50 million years ago.

During the Pleistocene period dating back over two million years ago, glaciation advancing and retreating repeatedly scoured the landscape leaving deposits of rock debris. The U-shaped cross section of the river valleys is a result of recent glaciation. Several glaciers lie on the slopes of Buck Mountain. Uplift and faulting in combination with glaciation have been the dominant processes which have created the tall peaks and deep valleys of the North Cascades area.

== Climate ==
Brahma Peak is located in the marine west coast climate zone of western North America. Many weather fronts originating in the Pacific Ocean travel northeast toward the Cascade Mountains. As fronts approach the North Cascades, they are forced upward by the peaks (orographic lift), causing them to drop their moisture in the form of rain or snowfall onto the Cascades. As a result, the west side of the North Cascades experiences high precipitation, especially during the winter months in the form of snowfall. Because of maritime influence, snow tends to be wet and heavy, resulting in high avalanche danger. During winter months, weather is usually cloudy, but due to high pressure systems over the Pacific Ocean that intensify during summer months, there is often little or no cloud cover during the summer. Due to its temperate climate and proximity to the Pacific Ocean, areas west of the Cascade Crest very rarely experience temperatures below 0 °F (−18 °C) or above 80 °F (27 °C).

== Gallery ==
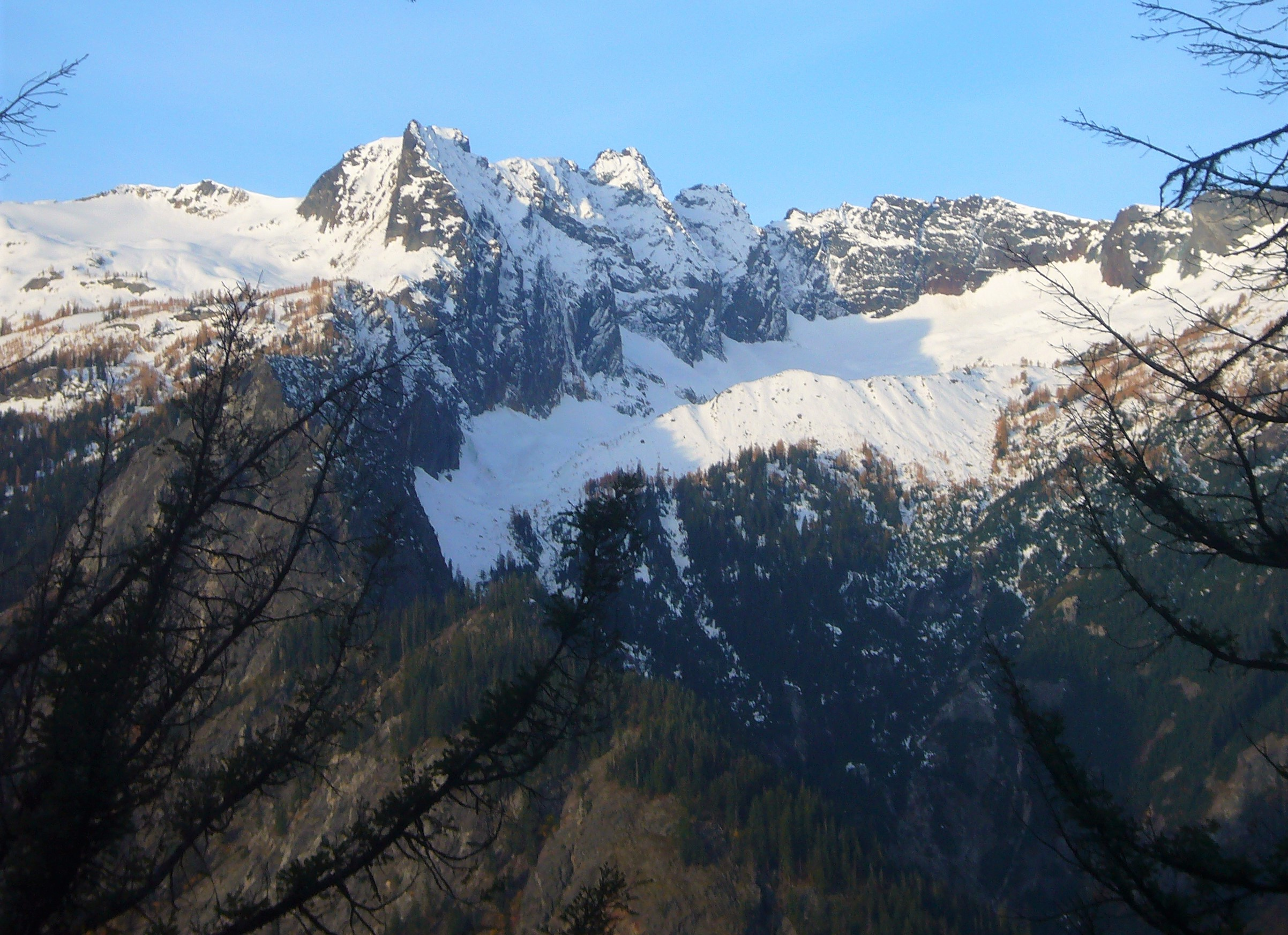
Brahma Peak centered

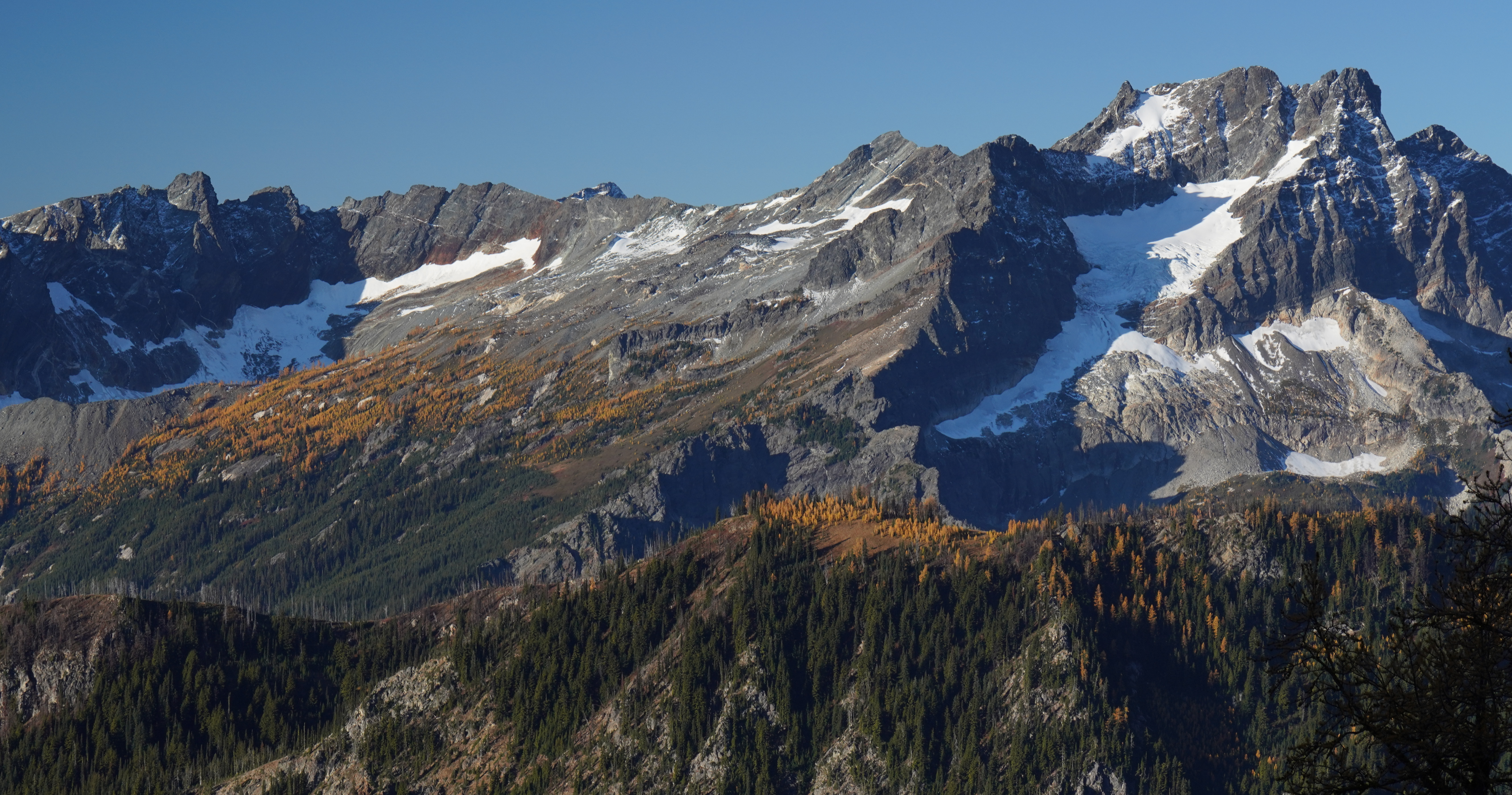
Brahma Peak (left) and Buck Mountain

== See also ==
- Geology of the Pacific Northwest
- Geography of the North Cascades
- List of Highest Mountain Peaks in Washington
