= Cirque Mountain (Washington) =

Mountain in Washington (state), United States

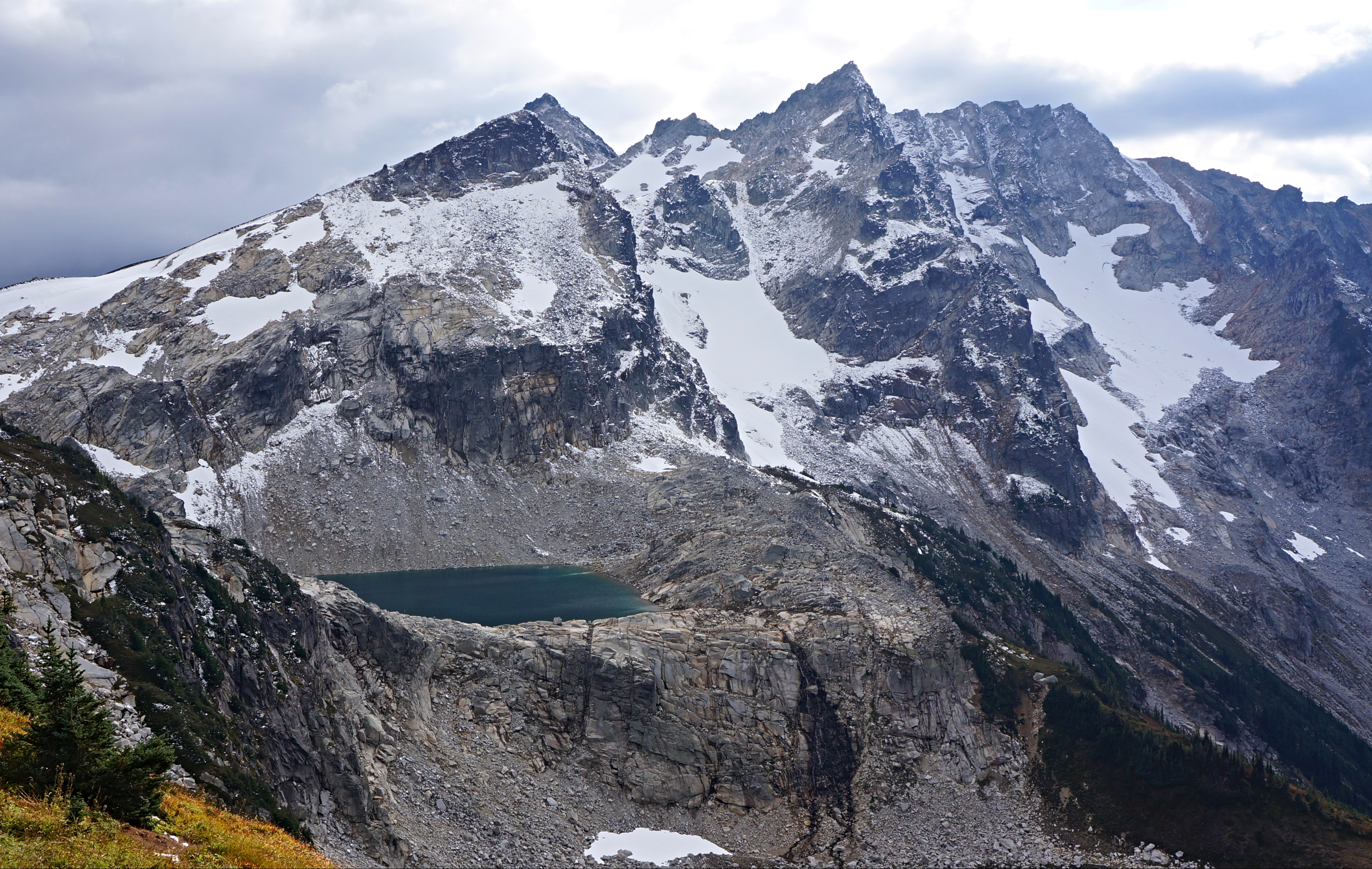
- Northeast aspect, with Triad Lake

Highest point
- Elevation: 7,966 ft (2,428 m)
- Prominence: 246 ft (75 m)
- Parent peak: Napeequa Peak 8,073 ft
- Isolation: 2.3 mi (3.7 km)
- Coordinates: 48°06′31″N 120°58′22″W

Geography
- Location within Washington (state) Location within the United States
- Interactive map of Cirque Mountain
- Country: United States
- State: Washington
- County: Snohomish / Chelan
- Protected area: Glacier Peak Wilderness
- Parent range: North Cascades; Cascade Range
- Topo map: USGS Clark Mountain

Geology
- Rock age: Cretaceous
- Rock type: Granodiorite

Cirque Mountain is a 7,966-foot (2,428-metre) mountain summit located in the Glacier Peak Wilderness of the North Cascades in Washington state. The mountain is situated on the crest of the Cascade Range, on the shared border of Snohomish County and Chelan County, also straddling the boundary between the Mount Baker-Snoqualmie National Forest and the Wenatchee National Forest. Its nearest higher peak is Napeequa Peak, 0.3 mi (0.48 km) to the south. The peak is set on Chiwawa Ridge with Napeequa, and other notable peaks on this ridge include Fortress Mountain, Buck Mountain, Brahma Peak, Mount Berge, and Chiwawa Mountain. Topographic relief is significant since the western aspect of the mountain rises 4,000 feet above the Suiattle Valley in approximately 1.5 mi (2.4 km). This mountain has small, unnamed, hanging glaciers in cirques surrounding the summit. Precipitation runoff from the peak and meltwater from the glaciers drains east to the headwaters of Napeequa River; or west into the Suiattle River.

== Geology ==
The North Cascades features some of the most rugged topography in the Cascade Range with craggy peaks, ridges, and deep glacial valleys. Geological events occurring many years ago created the diverse topography and drastic elevation changes over the Cascade Range leading to various climate differences.

The history of the formation of the Cascade Mountains dates back millions of years ago to the late Eocene Epoch. With the North American Plate overriding the Pacific Plate, episodes of volcanic igneous activity persisted. In addition, small fragments of the oceanic and continental lithosphere called terranes created the North Cascades about 50 million years ago. During the Pleistocene period dating back over two million years ago, glaciation advancing and retreating repeatedly scoured and shaped the landscape. Glaciation was most prevalent approximately 18,000 years ago, and most valleys were ice-free by 12,000 years ago. Uplift and faulting in combination with glaciation have been the dominant processes which have created the tall peaks and deep valleys of the North Cascades area.

Subduction and tectonic activity in the area began during the late cretaceous period, about 90 million years ago. Extensive volcanic activity began to take place in the oligocene, about 35 million years ago. Glacier Peak, a stratovolcano that is 6.5 mi (10.5 km) west of Cirque Mountain, began forming in the mid-Pleistocene. Due to Glacier Peak's proximity to Cirque Mountain, volcanic ash is common in the area.

== Climate ==
Cirque Mountain is located in the marine west coast climate zone of western North America. Most weather fronts originate in the Pacific Ocean, and travel northeast toward the Cascade Mountains. As fronts approach the North Cascades, they are forced upward by the peaks of the Cascade Range, causing them to drop their moisture in the form of rain or snowfall onto the Cascades (Orographic lift). As a result, the west side of the North Cascades experiences high precipitation, especially during the winter months in the form of snowfall. During winter months, weather is usually cloudy, but, due to high pressure systems over the Pacific Ocean that intensify during summer months, there is often little or no cloud cover during the summer. Because of maritime influence, snow tends to be wet and heavy, resulting in high avalanche danger.

== Gallery ==
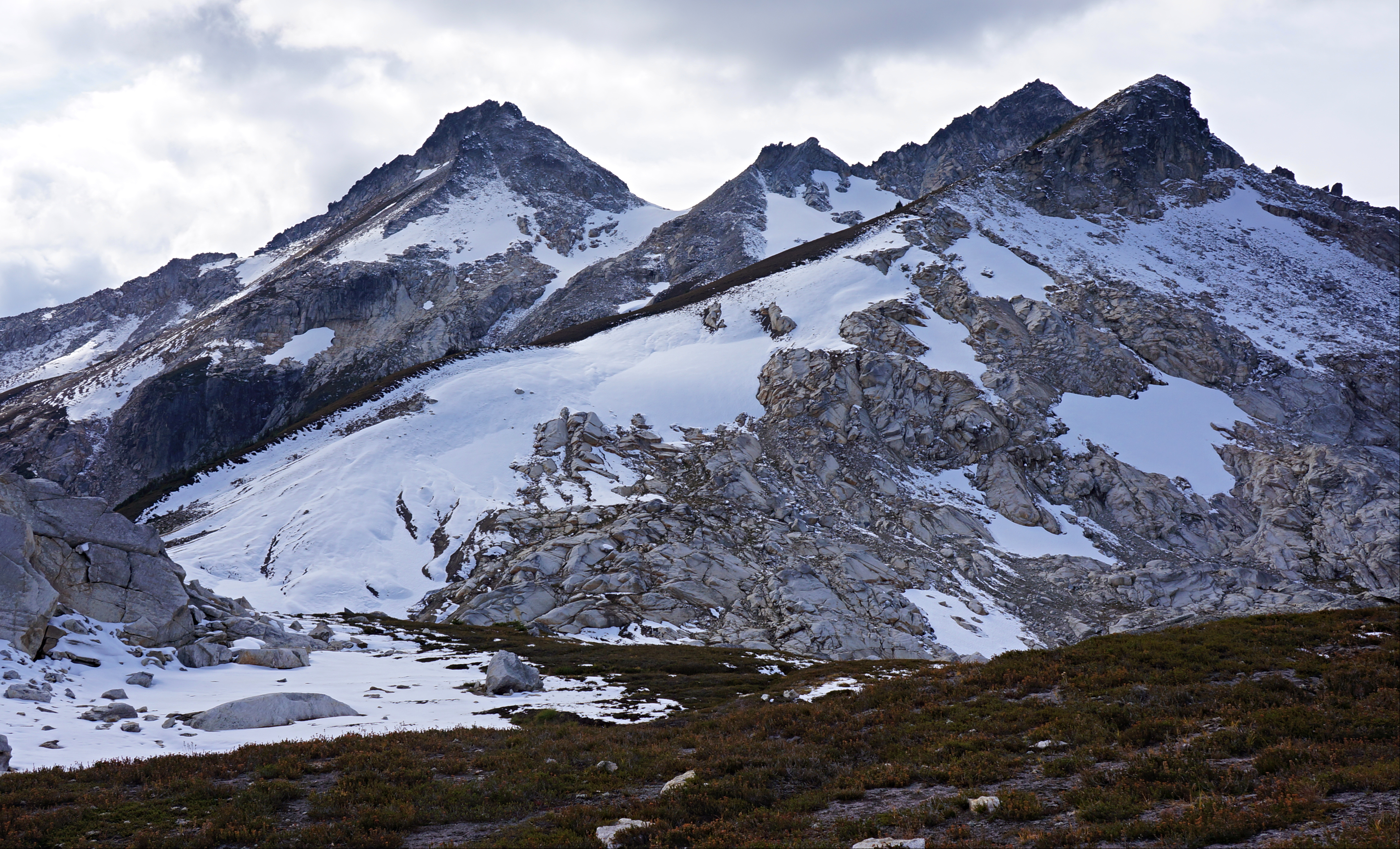
Left to right: Napeequa Peak, Cirque Mountain, and Peak 7529 seen from High Pass

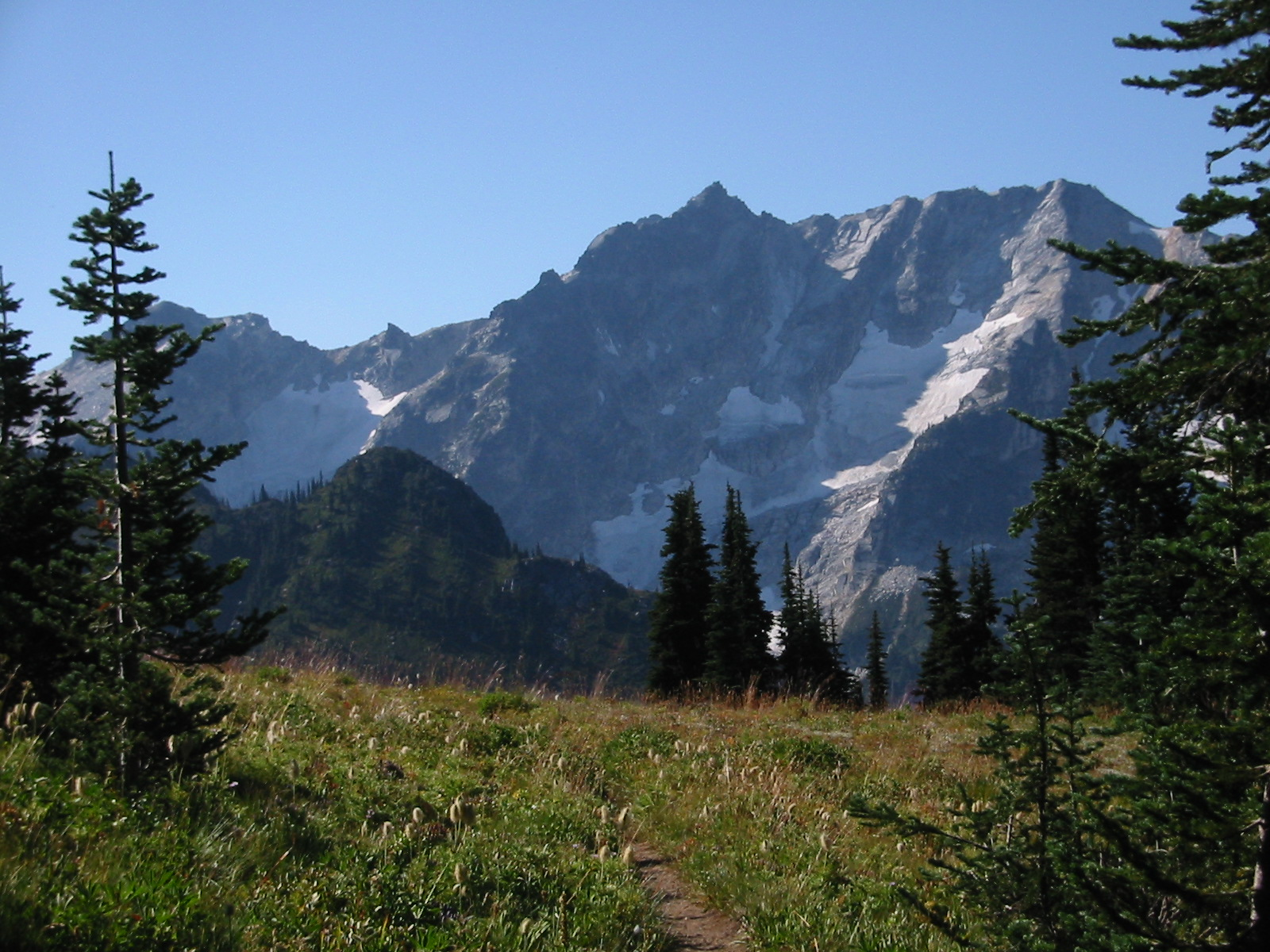
Cirque Mountain

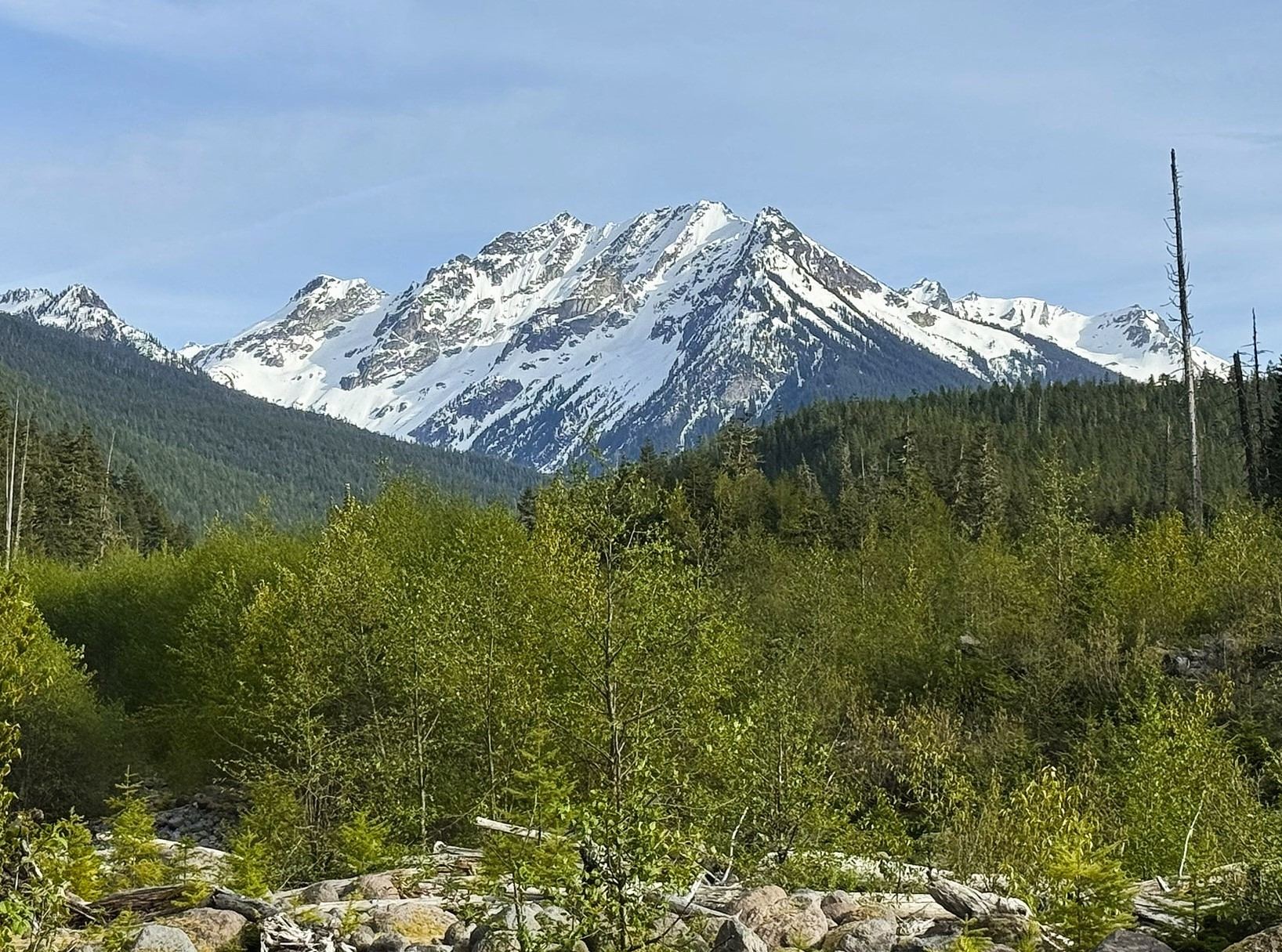
North aspect from Suiattle River Valley

== See also ==
- Geography of the North Cascades
- List of Highest Mountain Peaks in Washington
