= Fortress Mountain (Washington) =

Mountain in Washington, USA

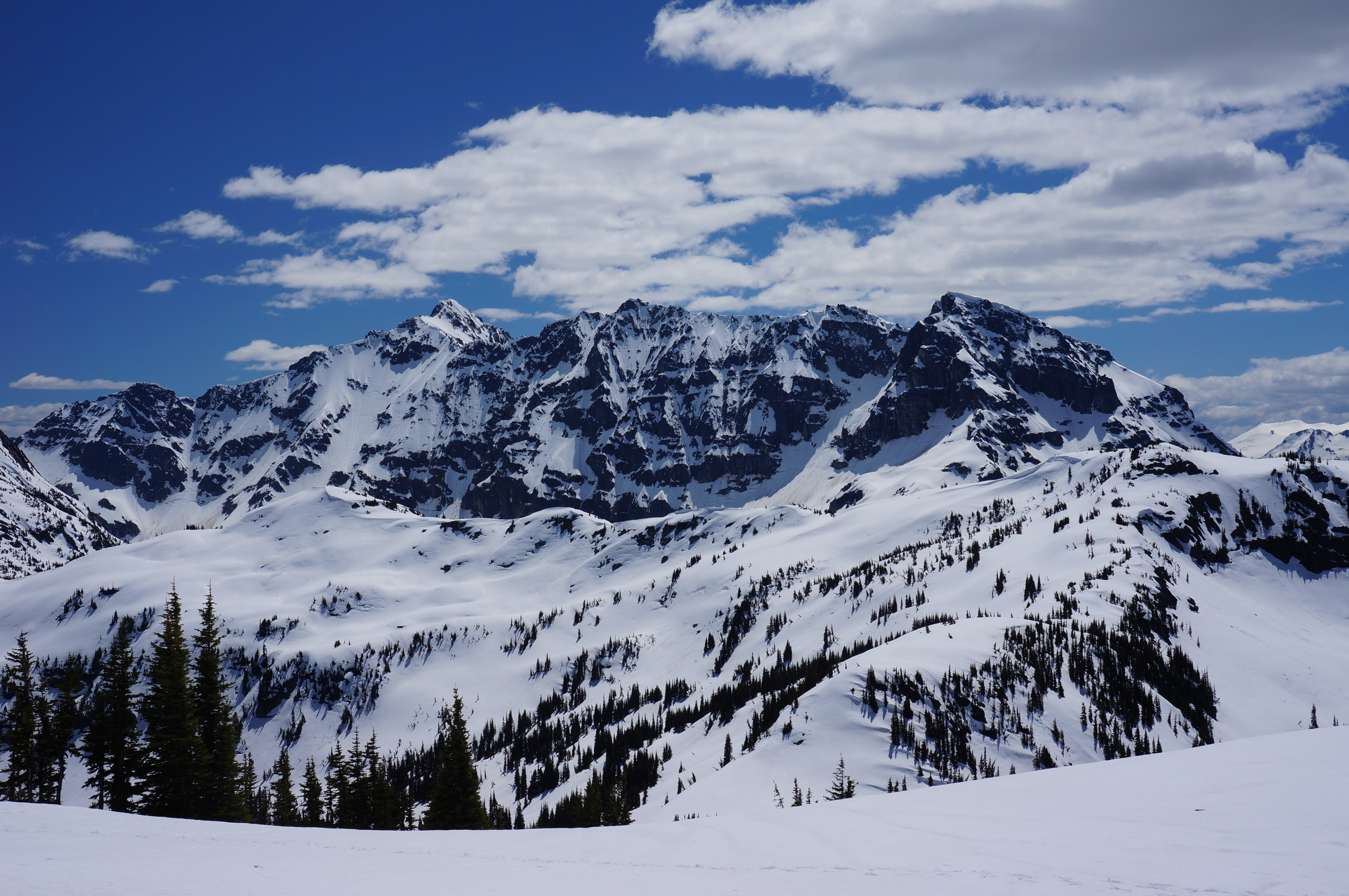
- Fortress Mountain

Highest point
- Elevation: 8,679 ft (2,645 m)
- Prominence: 1,654 ft (504 m)
- Parent peak: Seven Fingered Jack
- Isolation: 5.49 mi (8.84 km)
- Coordinates: 48°09′33″N 120°56′02″W

Geography
- Location within Washington (state) Location within the United States
- Interactive map of Fortress Mountain
- Country: United States
- State: Washington
- County: Chelan / Snohomish
- Protected area: Glacier Peak Wilderness
- Parent range: Cascade Range
- Topo map: USGS Suiattle Pass

Fortress Mountain is an 8,679-foot (2,645 m) peak in the Cascade Range located about 15 miles (24 km) west of Lake Chelan in Chelan/Snohomish Counties, Washington, United States. It straddles the border between the Mount Baker-Snoqualmie National Forest and the Wenatchee National Forest, and is also part of the Glacier Peak Wilderness. Fortress Mountain is the highest point on Chiwawa Ridge, and other notable peaks on this ridge include Napeequa Peak, Buck Mountain, Brahma Peak, Bandit Peak, Mount Berge, Helmet Butte, and Chiwawa Mountain.

== Geology ==
The Glacier Peak Wilderness of the North Cascades features some of the most rugged topography in the Cascade Range with craggy peaks, ridges, and deep glacial valleys. Geological events occurring many years ago created the diverse topography and drastic elevation changes over the Cascade Range leading to the various climate differences.

The history of the formation of the Cascade Mountains dates back millions of years ago to the late Eocene Epoch. With the North American Plate overriding the Pacific Plate, episodes of volcanic igneous activity persisted. In addition, small fragments of the oceanic and continental lithosphere called terranes created the North Cascades about 50 million years ago.

During the Pleistocene period dating back over two million years ago, glaciation advancing and retreating repeatedly scoured the landscape leaving deposits of rock debris. The U-shaped cross section of the river valleys is a result of recent glaciation. Uplift and faulting in combination with glaciation have been the dominant processes which have created the tall peaks and deep valleys of the North Cascades area.

== Climate ==
Weather fronts originating in the Pacific Ocean travel east toward the Cascade Mountains. As fronts approach, they are forced upward by the peaks of the Cascade Range, causing them to drop their moisture in the form of rain or snow onto the Cascades (Orographic lift). As a result, the Cascades experience high precipitation, especially during the winter months in the form of snowfall. During winter months, weather is usually cloudy, but due to high pressure systems over the Pacific Ocean that intensify during summer months, there is often little or no cloud cover during the summer. The months of July through September offer the most favorable weather for viewing or climbing this peak.

== Gallery ==
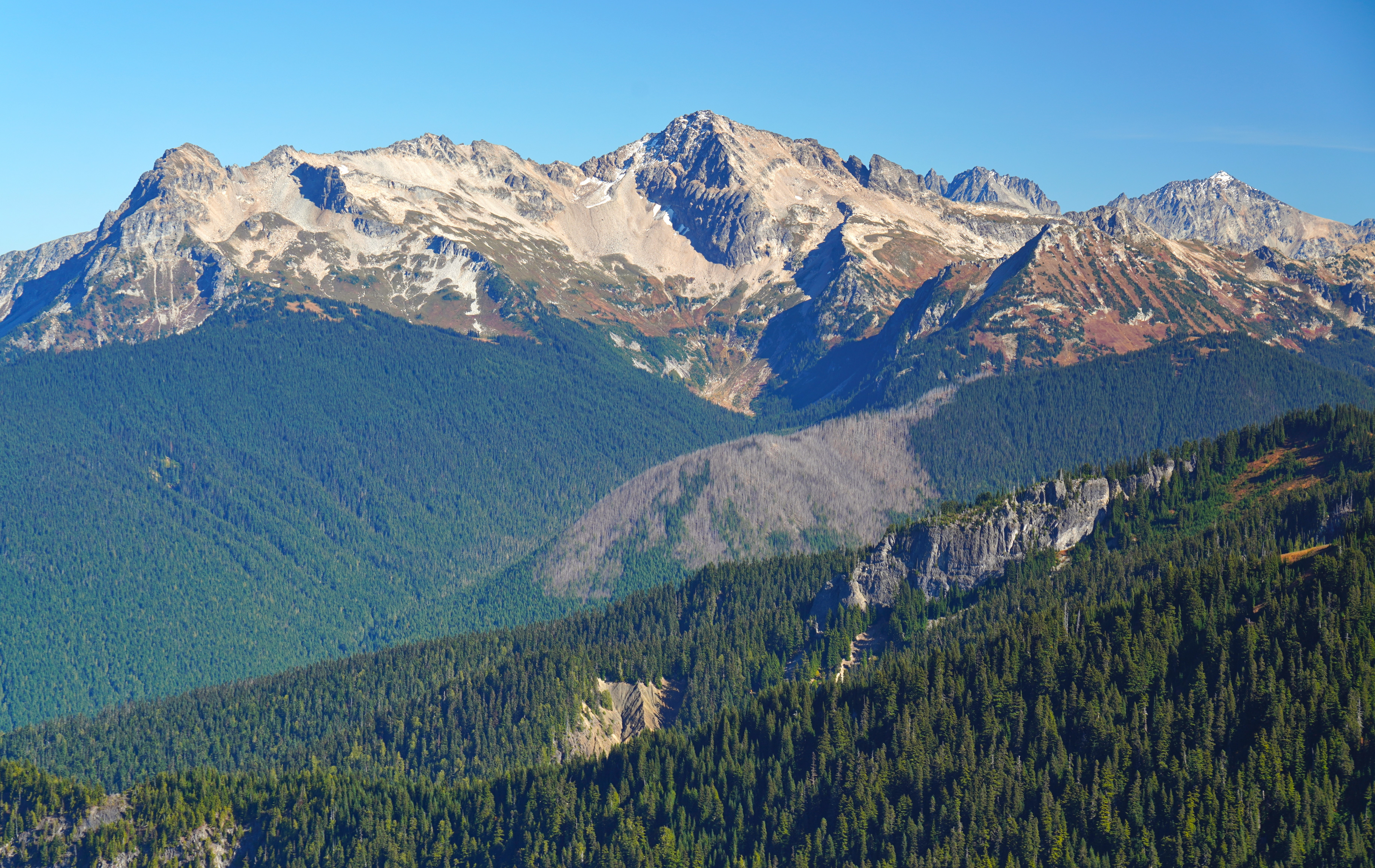
West aspect

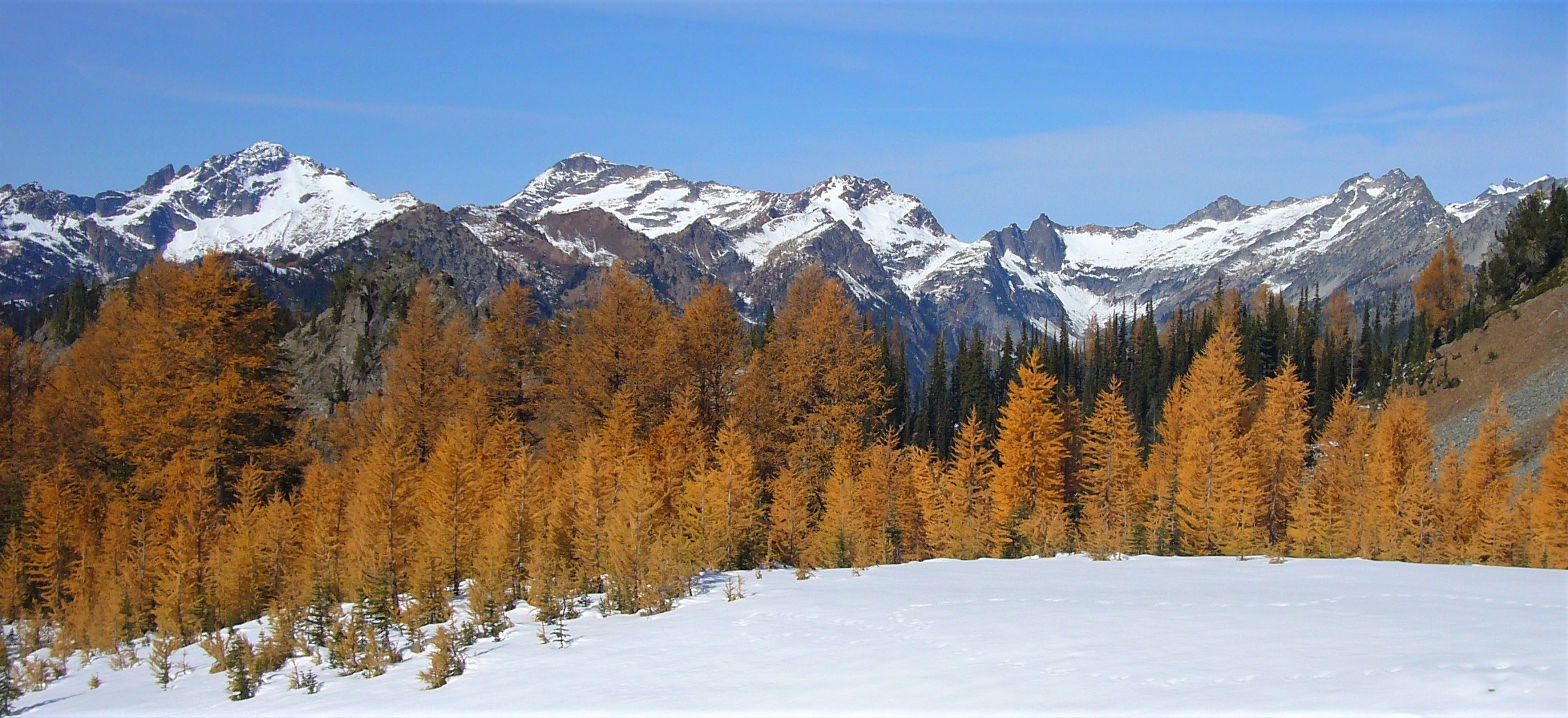
Fortress (left), Chiwawa Mountain, Dumbell Mountain (right)

== See also ==
- List of highest mountain peaks in Washington
- Geography of the North Cascades
- Geology of the Pacific Northwest
