= Lyman Glacier =

Lyman Glacier may refer to:

- Lyman Glacier (Mount Adams), in Gifford Pinchot National Forest in the U.S. state of Washington
- Lyman Glacier (North Cascades), in Wenatchee National Forest in the U.S. state of Washington
