= Helmet Butte =

Mountain of Washington (state)

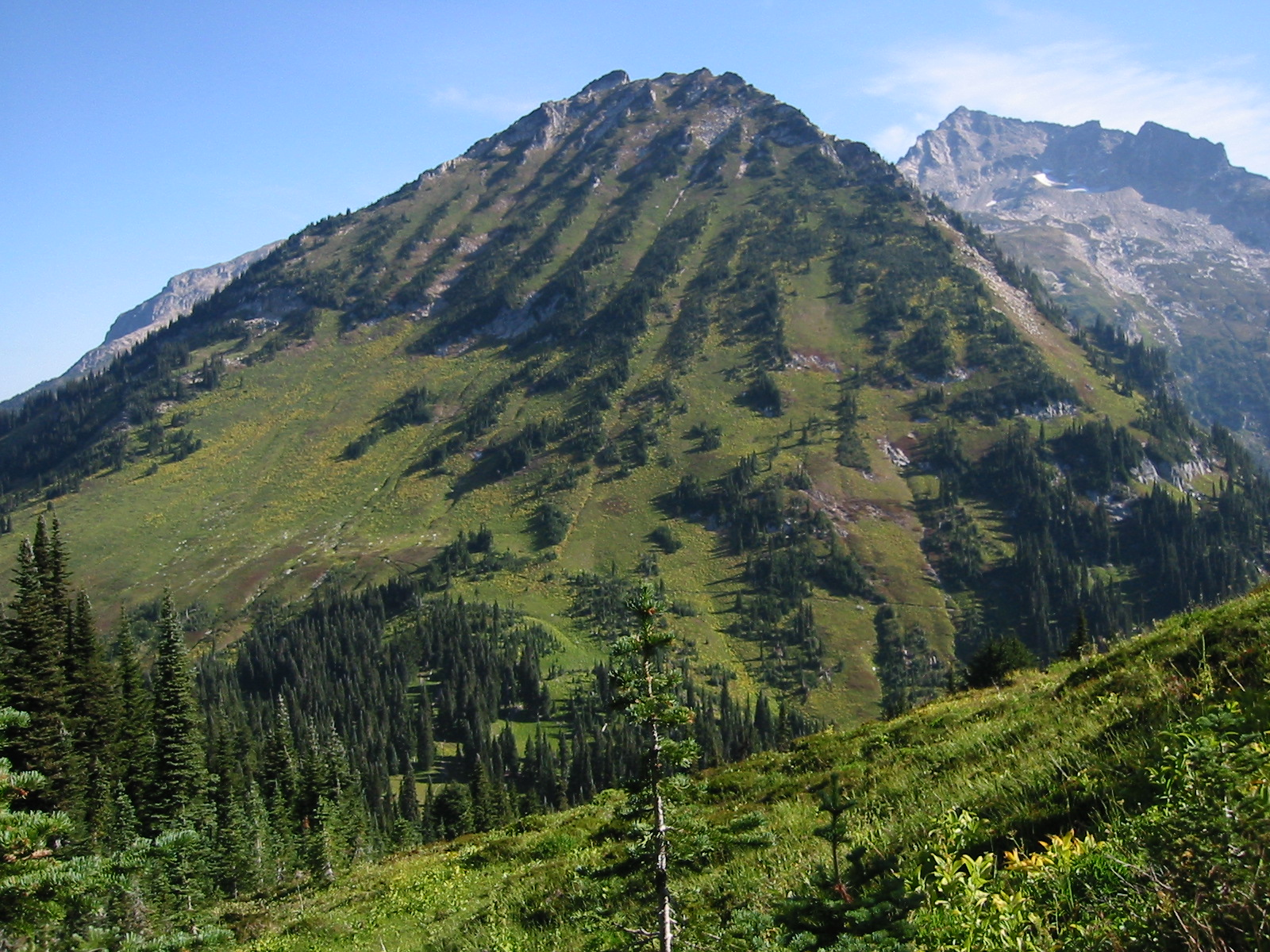
- Southwest aspect (Fortress Mountain behind, right)

Highest point
- Elevation: 7,400 ft (2,256 m)
- Prominence: 1,000 ft (305 m)
- Parent peak: Fortress Mountain (8,671 ft)
- Isolation: 1.24 mi (2.00 km)
- Coordinates: 48°08′58″N 120°57′19″W

Geography
- Location within Washington (state) Location within the United States
- Interactive map of Helmet Butte
- Country: United States
- State: Washington
- County: Snohomish / Chelan
- Protected area: Glacier Peak Wilderness
- Parent range: Cascade Range; North Cascades
- Topo map: USGS Suiattle Pass

Geology
- Rock type(s): Granodiorite, Quartz diorite

Climbing
- Easiest route: class 3 scrambling

Helmet Butte is a 7,400-foot (2,256-metre) summit located in the Glacier Peak Wilderness of the North Cascades in Washington state.

== Description ==
Helmet Butte is situated on the crest of the Cascade Range, on the shared border of Snohomish County and Chelan County, also straddling the boundary between the Mount Baker-Snoqualmie National Forest and the Okanogan–Wenatchee National Forest. The nearest higher neighbor is line parent Fortress Mountain, 0.62 mi (1.00 km) to the northeast. Precipitation runoff from the mountain drains southeast to Chiwawa River via Buck Creek; and west to the Suiattle River via Small Creek. Topographic relief is significant as the northern aspect of the mountain rises 2,000 feet above Small Creek in approximately one-half mile, and the south aspect rises 2,600 feet above Buck Creek in approximately one mile. This remote peak is situated immediately northeast above Buck Creek Pass, and access is via the Buck Creek Pass Trail. This geographic feature was named by Albert Hale Sylvester, a pioneer surveyor, explorer, topographer, and forest supervisor in the Cascades who named thousands of natural features. He once wrote that of all the many places he had explored and visited in the Cascades he thought the most beautiful was the Buck Creek area, near Buck Creek Pass. This landform's toponym has been officially adopted by the U.S. Board on Geographic Names.

== Geology ==
The North Cascades features some of the most rugged topography in the Cascade Range with craggy peaks, ridges, and deep glacial valleys. Geological events occurring many years ago created the diverse topography and drastic elevation changes over the Cascade Range leading to various climate differences.

The history of the formation of the Cascade Mountains dates back millions of years ago to the late Eocene Epoch. With the North American Plate overriding the Pacific Plate, episodes of volcanic igneous activity persisted. In addition, small fragments of the oceanic and continental lithosphere called terranes created the North Cascades about 50 million years ago. During the Pleistocene period dating back over two million years ago, glaciation advancing and retreating repeatedly scoured and shaped the landscape. Glaciation was most prevalent approximately 18,000 years ago, and most valleys were ice-free by 12,000 years ago. Uplift and faulting in combination with glaciation have been the dominant processes which have created the tall peaks and deep valleys of the North Cascades area.

Subduction and tectonic activity in the area began during the late cretaceous period, about 90 million years ago. Extensive volcanic activity began to take place in the oligocene, about 35 million years ago. Glacier Peak, a stratovolcano that is 7.5 mi (12.1 km) west-southwest of Helmet Butte, began forming in the mid-Pleistocene. Due to Glacier Peak's proximity to Helmet Butte, volcanic ash is common in the area.

== Climate ==
Helmet Butte is located in the marine west coast climate zone of western North America. Most weather fronts coming off the Pacific Ocean travel east toward the Cascade Mountains. As fronts approach the North Cascades, they are forced upward by the peaks (orographic lift), causing them to drop their moisture in the form of rain or snowfall onto the Cascades. As a result, the west side of the North Cascades experiences high precipitation, especially during the winter months in the form of snowfall. Because of maritime influence, snow tends to be wet and heavy, resulting in high avalanche danger. During winter months, weather is usually cloudy, but due to high pressure systems over the Pacific Ocean that intensify during summer months, there is often little or no cloud cover during the summer.

== Gallery ==
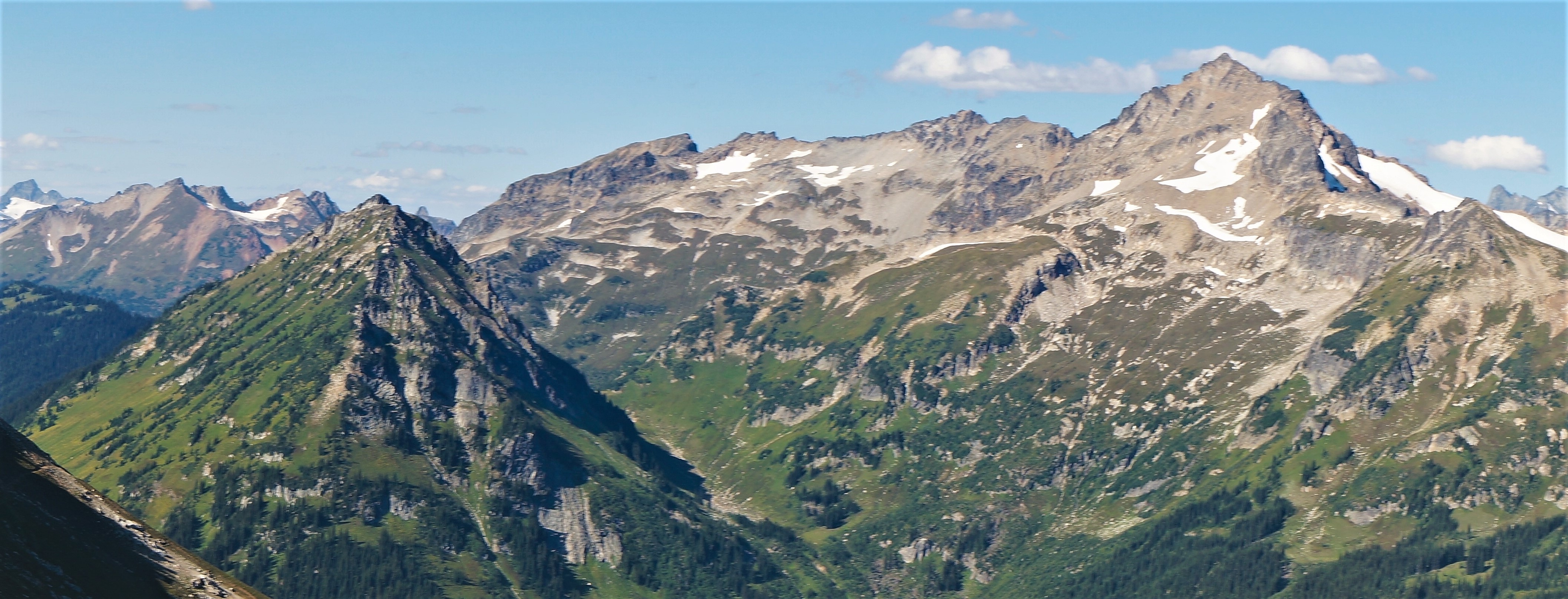
South aspect of Helmet Butte (left) and Fortress Mountain.

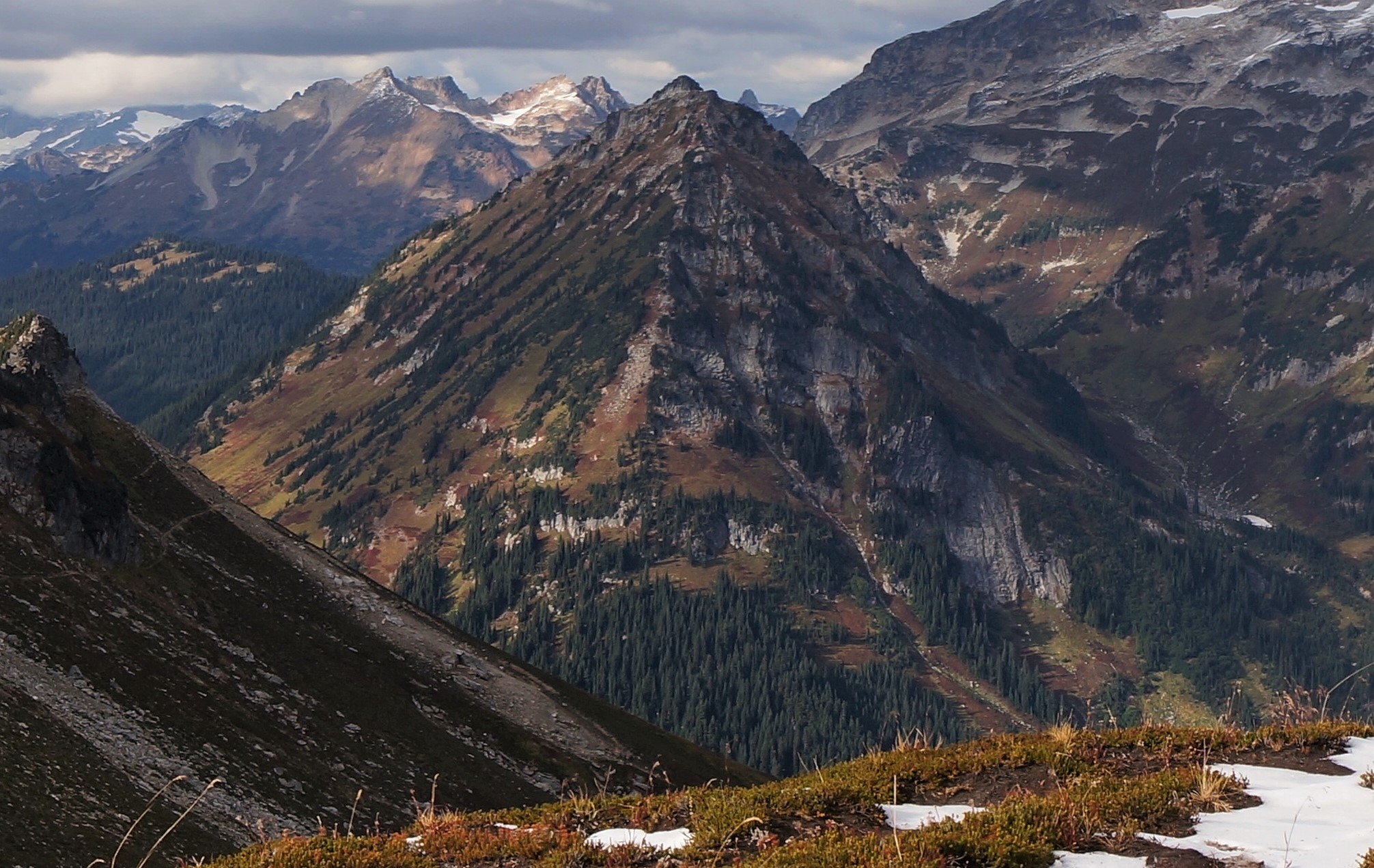
South aspect

== See also ==
- Geography of the North Cascades
