= Lyman Glacier (North Cascades) =

Glacier in Washington, United States

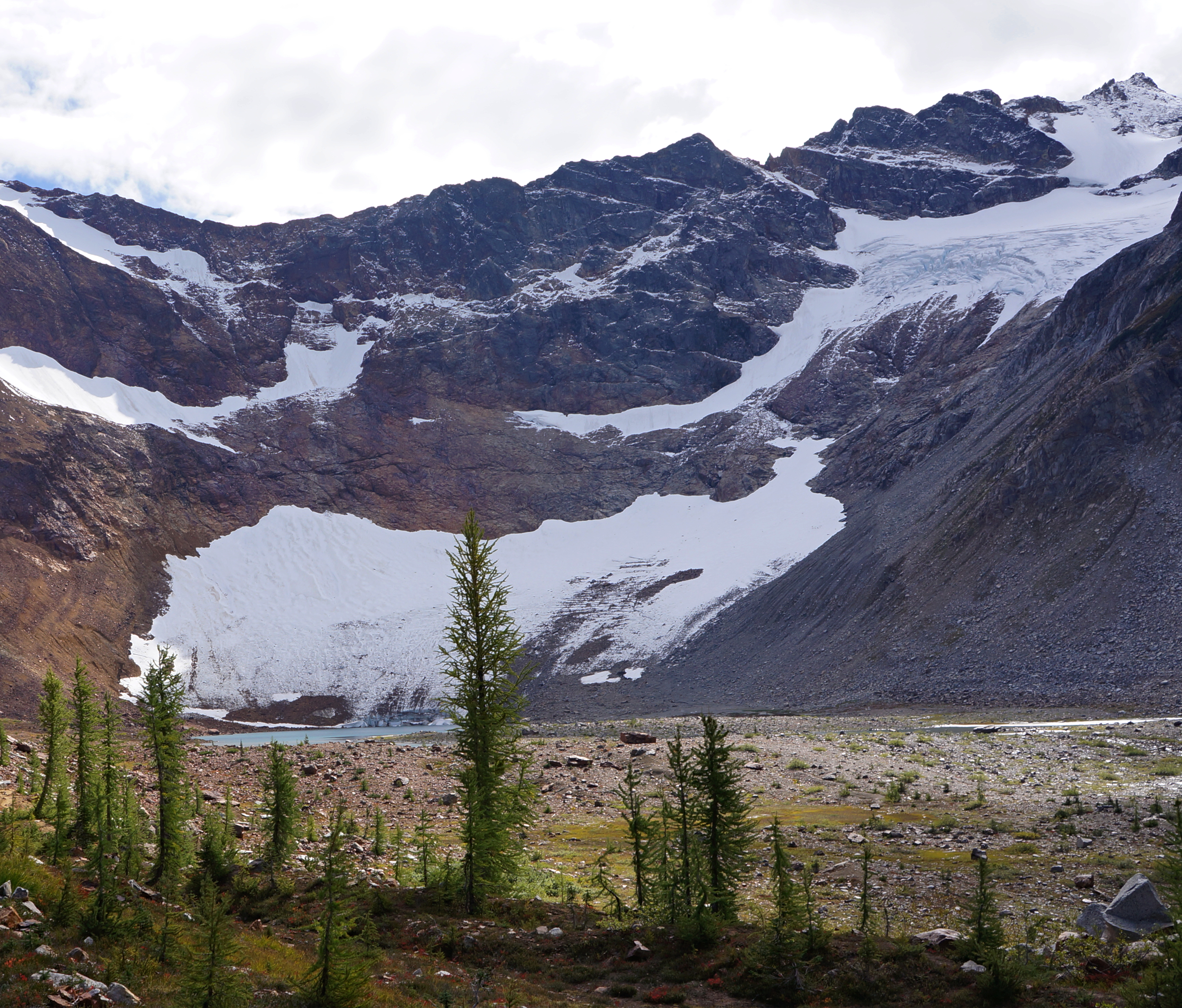

- Location within Washington (state)
- Type: Mountain glacier
- Location: Chelan County, Washington, U.S.
- Coordinates: 48°10′13″N 120°53′48″W
- Length: .25 mi (0.40 km)
- Terminus: Proglacial lake
- Status: Retreating

Lyman Glacier is in Wenatchee National Forest in the U.S. state of Washington and is just northeast of Chiwawa Mountain. Between the years 1890 and 2008, Lyman Glacier has retreated 1,310 m (4,300 ft) and lost 86 percent of its area, a reduction in its surface from 1.41 to .02 km^{2} (0.5444 to 0.0077 sq mi). Lyman Glacier terminates at a proglacial lake and a series of smaller lakes as well as a pronounced terminal moraine indicate where the glacier once extended to.

== See also ==
- List of glaciers in the United States
