= Napeequa Peak =

Mountain in Washington (state), United States

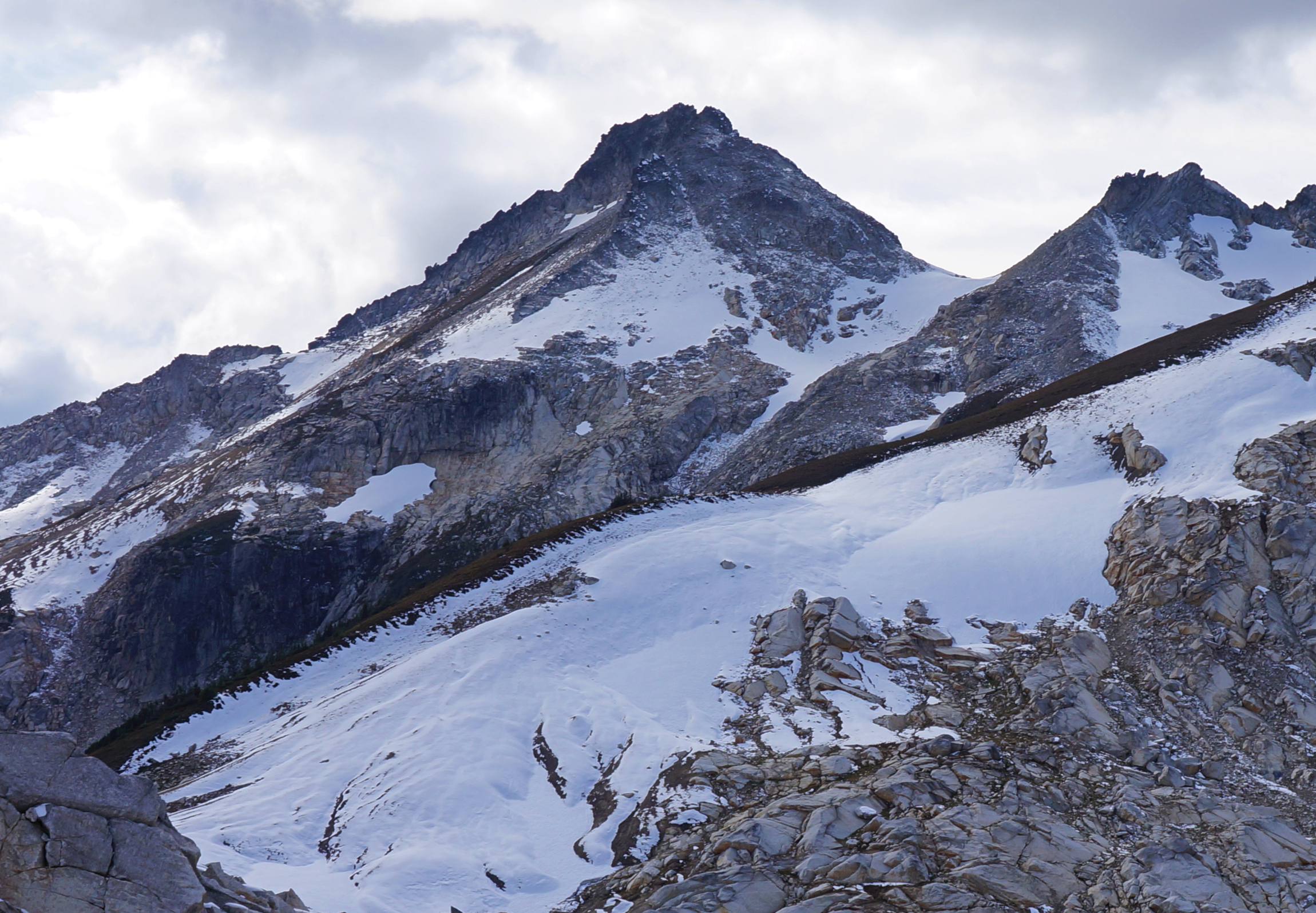
- Napeequa Peak

Highest point
- Elevation: 8,073 ft (2,461 m)
- Prominence: 1,273 ft (388 m)
- Parent peak: Buck Mountain 8528 ft
- Coordinates: 48°06′15″N 120°58′20″W

Naming
- English translation: white water
- Language of name: North American Indian languages

Geography
- Location within Washington (state) Location within the United States
- Location: Glacier Peak Wilderness
- Country: United States of America
- State: Washington
- County: Snohomish / Chelan
- Parent range: North Cascades; Cascade Range
- Topo map: USGS Clark Mountain

Geology
- Rock age: Cretaceous
- Rock type: Granodiorite

Climbing
- Easiest route: Scrambling

Napeequa Peak is an 8,073-foot (2,461-metre) pyramidal mountain summit located in the Glacier Peak Wilderness of the North Cascades in Washington state. The mountain is situated on the crest of the Cascade Range, on the shared border of Snohomish County and Chelan County, also straddling the boundary between the Mount Baker-Snoqualmie National Forest and the Wenatchee National Forest. Its nearest neighbor is Cirque Mountain, 0.3 mi (0.48 km) to the north, and the nearest higher peak is Buck Mountain, 2.56 mi (4.12 km) to the east-southeast. Precipitation runoff from the peak drains east to the headwaters of Napeequa River; or west into the Suiattle River. The mountain's name is taken from the river's name, which was applied by Albert Hale Sylvester (1871-1944), a pioneer surveyor, explorer, topographer, and forest supervisor in the Cascades.

== Geology ==
The North Cascades features some of the most rugged topography in the Cascade Range with craggy peaks, ridges, and deep glacial valleys. Geological events occurring many years ago created the diverse topography and drastic elevation changes over the Cascade Range leading to various climate differences.

The history of the formation of the Cascade Mountains dates back millions of years ago to the late Eocene Epoch. With the North American Plate overriding the Pacific Plate, episodes of volcanic igneous activity persisted. In addition, small fragments of the oceanic and continental lithosphere called terranes created the North Cascades about 50 million years ago. During the Pleistocene period dating back over two million years ago, glaciation advancing and retreating repeatedly scoured and shaped the landscape. Glaciation was most prevalent approximately 18,000 years ago, and most valleys were ice-free by 12,000 years ago. Uplift and faulting in combination with glaciation have been the dominant processes which have created the tall peaks and deep valleys of the North Cascades area. Subduction and tectonic activity in the area began during the late cretaceous period, about 90 million years ago. Extensive volcanic activity began to take place in the oligocene, about 35 million years ago. Glacier Peak, a stratovolcano that is 6.59 mi (10.61 km) west of Napeequa Peak, began forming in the mid-Pleistocene. Due to Glacier Peak's proximity to Napeequa Peak, volcanic ash is common in the area.

== Climate ==
Napeequa Peak is located in the marine west coast climate zone of western North America. Most weather fronts originate in the Pacific Ocean, and travel northeast toward the Cascade Mountains. As fronts approach the North Cascades, they are forced upward by the peaks of the Cascade Range, causing them to drop their moisture in the form of rain or snowfall onto the Cascades (Orographic lift). As a result, the west side of the North Cascades experiences high precipitation, especially during the winter months in the form of snowfall. During winter months, weather is usually cloudy, but, due to high pressure systems over the Pacific Ocean that intensify during summer months, there is often little or no cloud cover during the summer. Because of maritime influence, snow tends to be wet and heavy, resulting in high avalanche danger.

== See also ==
- Geology of the Pacific Northwest
- Geography of the North Cascades

== Gallery ==
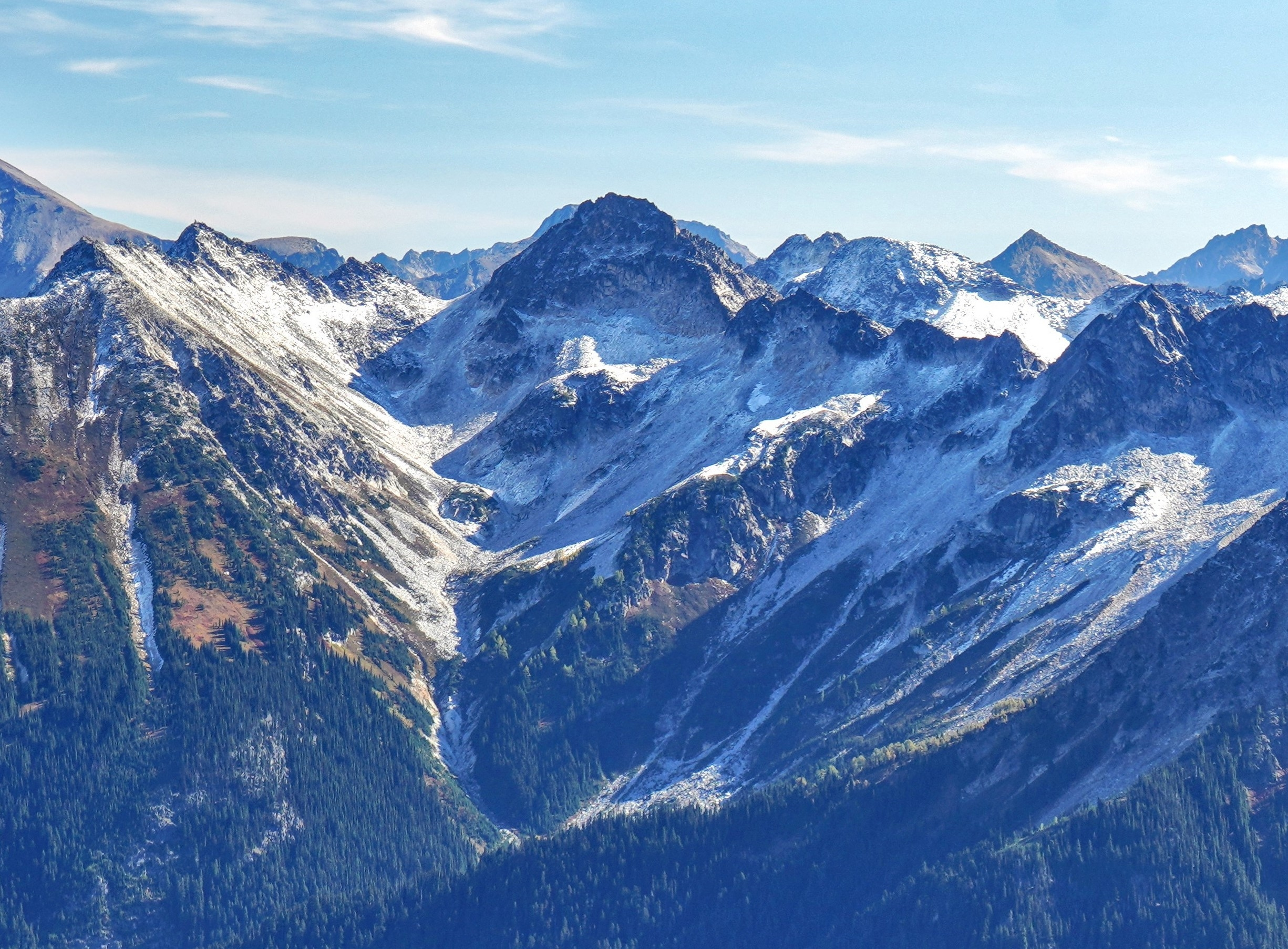
West aspect (center)

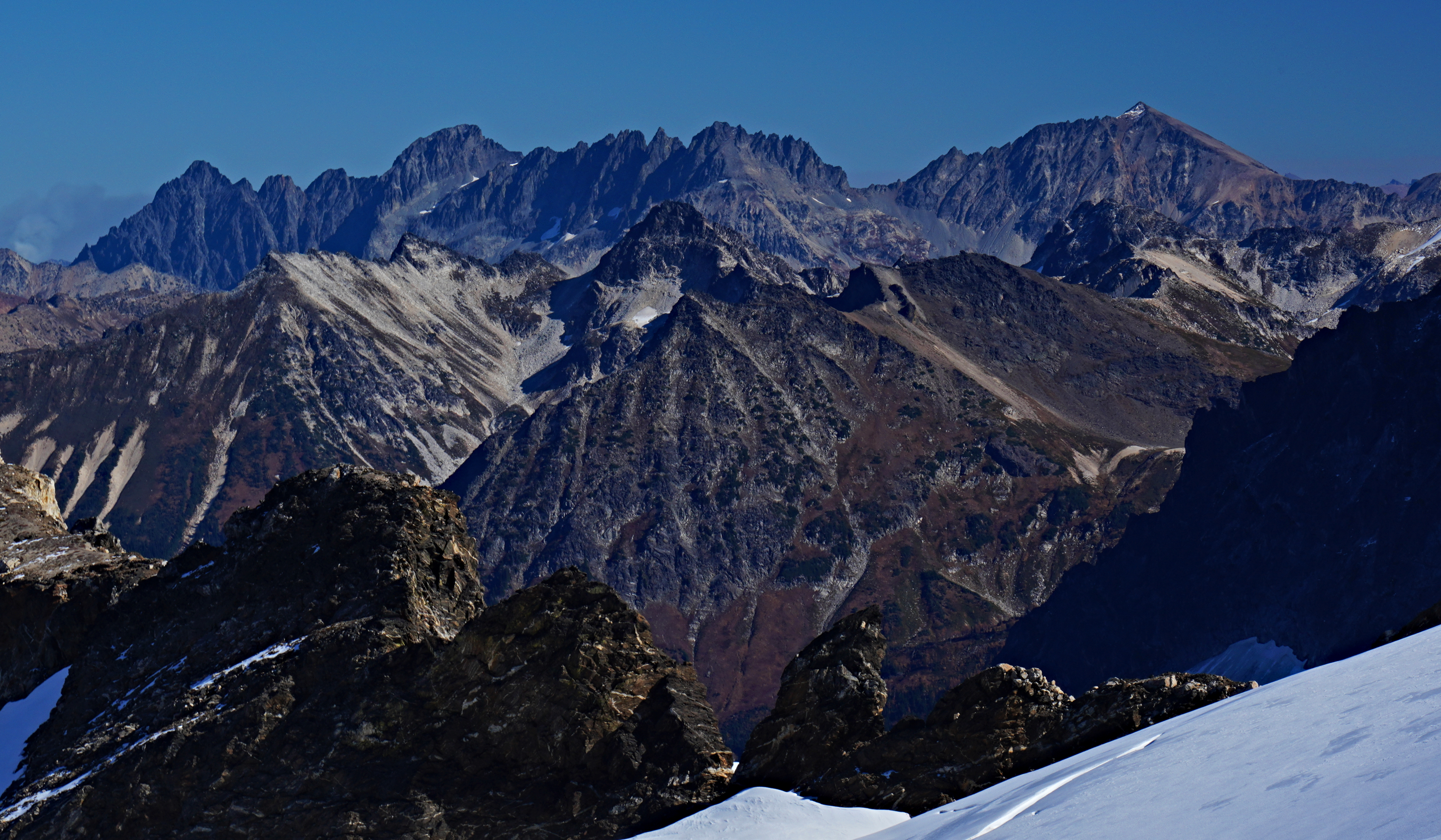
Napeequa Peak centered in the mid-distance with Cirque Mountain to its immediate left. Lined up in the back are the Entiat Mountains: Copper, Fernow, Seven Fingered Jack, and Maude
