= Buck Mountain (Washington) =

Mountain in Washington (state), United States

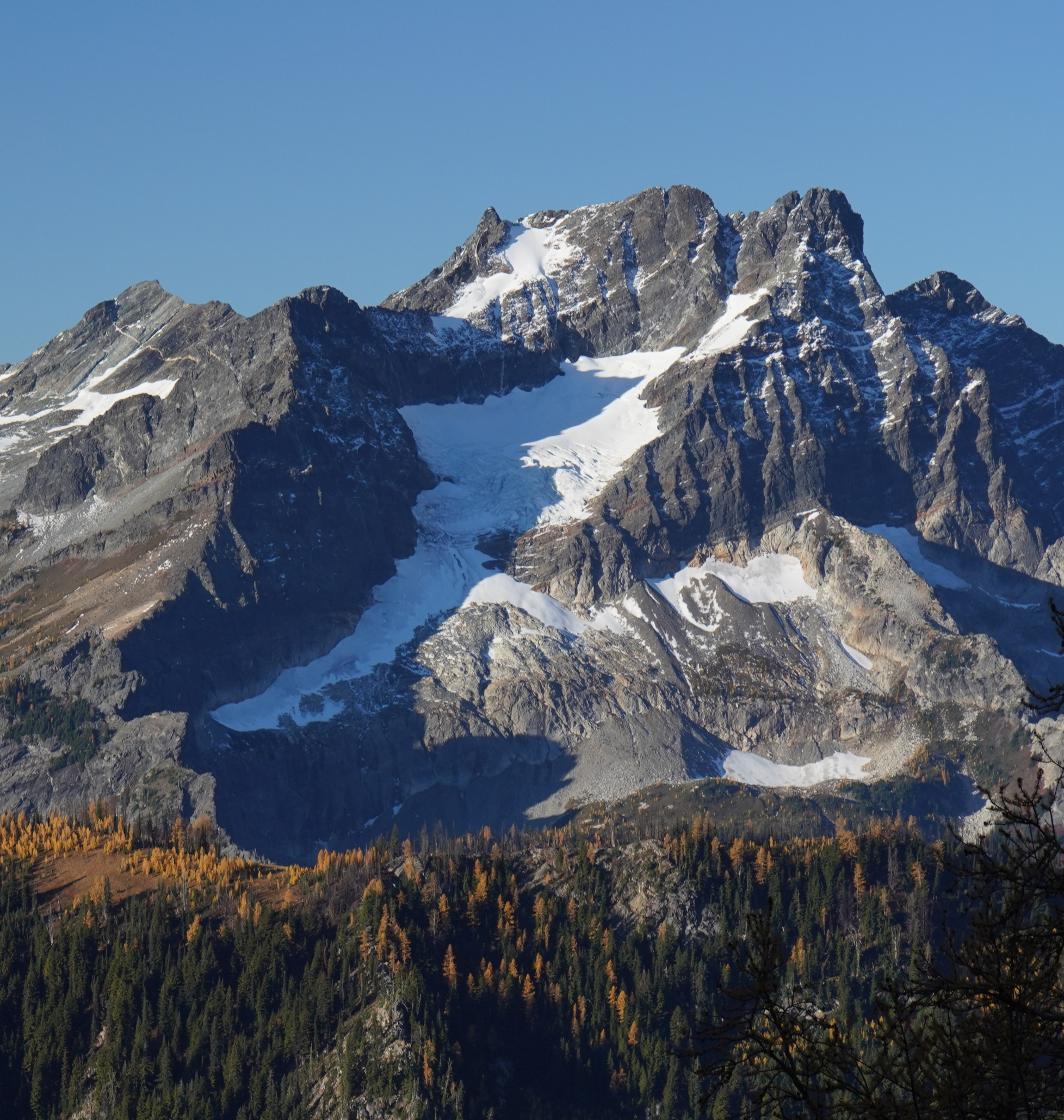
- Buck Mountain, northeast aspect

Highest point
- Elevation: 8,534 ft (2,601 m)
- Prominence: 1,923 ft (586 m)
- Parent peak: Clark Mountain (8,602 ft)
- Isolation: 3.92 mi (6.31 km)
- Coordinates: 48°05′37″N 120°54′44″W

Geography
- Location within Washington (state) Location within the United States
- Interactive map of Buck Mountain
- Country: United States
- State: Washington
- County: Chelan
- Protected area: Glacier Peak Wilderness
- Parent range: Cascade Range
- Topo map: USGS Clark Mountain

Climbing
- First ascent: 1948 Carl Suback, Ray Rigg
- Easiest route: Scrambling class 3

Buck Mountain is an 8,534-foot (2,601-metre) mountain summit in the Glacier Peak Wilderness of the North Cascades in Washington state. The mountain is located in Chelan County, in the Wenatchee National Forest. The nearest higher neighbor is Clark Mountain, 3.98 mi (6.41 km) to the southwest, and Brahma Peak is set 1.8 mi (2.9 km) to the south. Precipitation runoff from the mountain drains into Buck Creek, Chiwawa River, and Napeequa River, each a tributary of the Wenatchee River. The mountain's toponym was applied by Albert Hale Sylvester (1871-1944), pioneer surveyor, explorer, topographer, and forest supervisor in the Cascades.

== Geology ==
The North Cascades feature some of the most rugged topography in the Cascade Range with craggy peaks, spires, ridges, and deep glacial valleys. Geological events occurring many years ago created the diverse topography and drastic elevation changes over the Cascade Range leading to the various climate differences.

The history of the formation of the Cascade Mountains dates back millions of years ago to the late Eocene Epoch. With the North American Plate overriding the Pacific Plate, episodes of volcanic igneous activity persisted. Glacier Peak, a stratovolcano that is 9.0 mi (14.5 km) west of Buck Mountain, began forming in the mid-Pleistocene. In addition, small fragments of the oceanic and continental lithosphere called terranes created the North Cascades about 50 million years ago.

During the Pleistocene period dating back over two million years ago, glaciation advancing and retreating repeatedly scoured the landscape leaving deposits of rock debris. The U-shaped cross section of the river valleys is a result of recent glaciation. Several glaciers lie on the slopes of Buck Mountain. Uplift and faulting in combination with glaciation have been the dominant processes which have created the tall peaks and deep valleys of the North Cascades area.

== Climate ==
Buck Mountain is located in the marine west coast climate zone of western North America. Most weather fronts originating in the Pacific Ocean travel northeast toward the Cascade Mountains. As fronts approach the North Cascades, they are forced upward by the peaks (orographic lift), causing them to drop their moisture in the form of rain or snow onto the Cascades. As a result, the west side of the North Cascades experiences high precipitation, especially during the winter months in the form of snowfall. Because of maritime influence, snow tends to be wet and heavy, resulting in high avalanche danger. During winter months, weather is usually cloudy, but, due to high pressure systems over the Pacific Ocean that intensify during summer months, there is often little or no cloud cover during the summer.

== Gallery ==
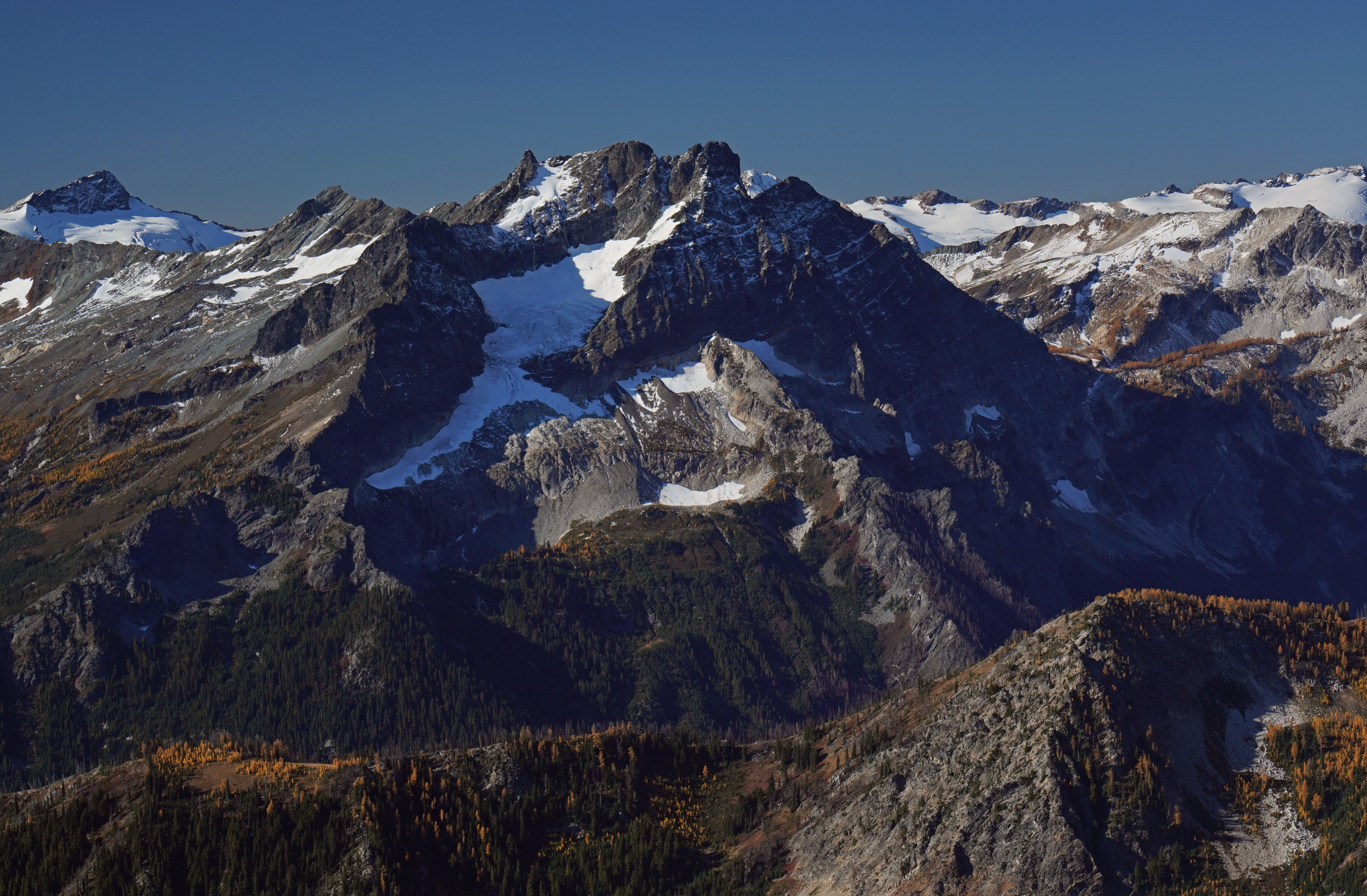
Buck from Mount Maude

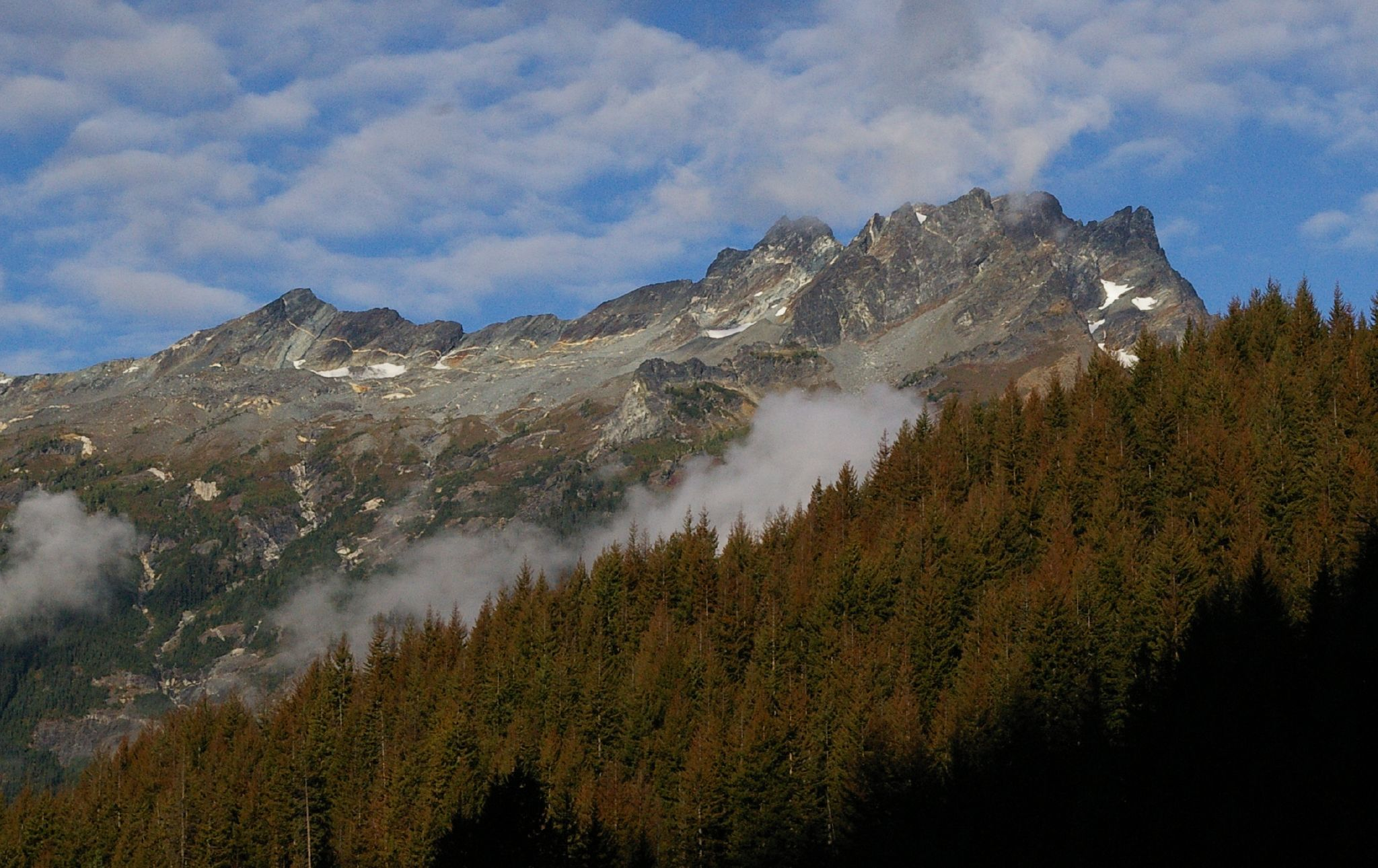
Buck Mountain from the southeast

== See also ==
- Geology of the Pacific Northwest
- Geography of the North Cascades
- List of mountain peaks of Washington (state)
