= Chiwawa Mountain =

Mountain in Washington (state), United States

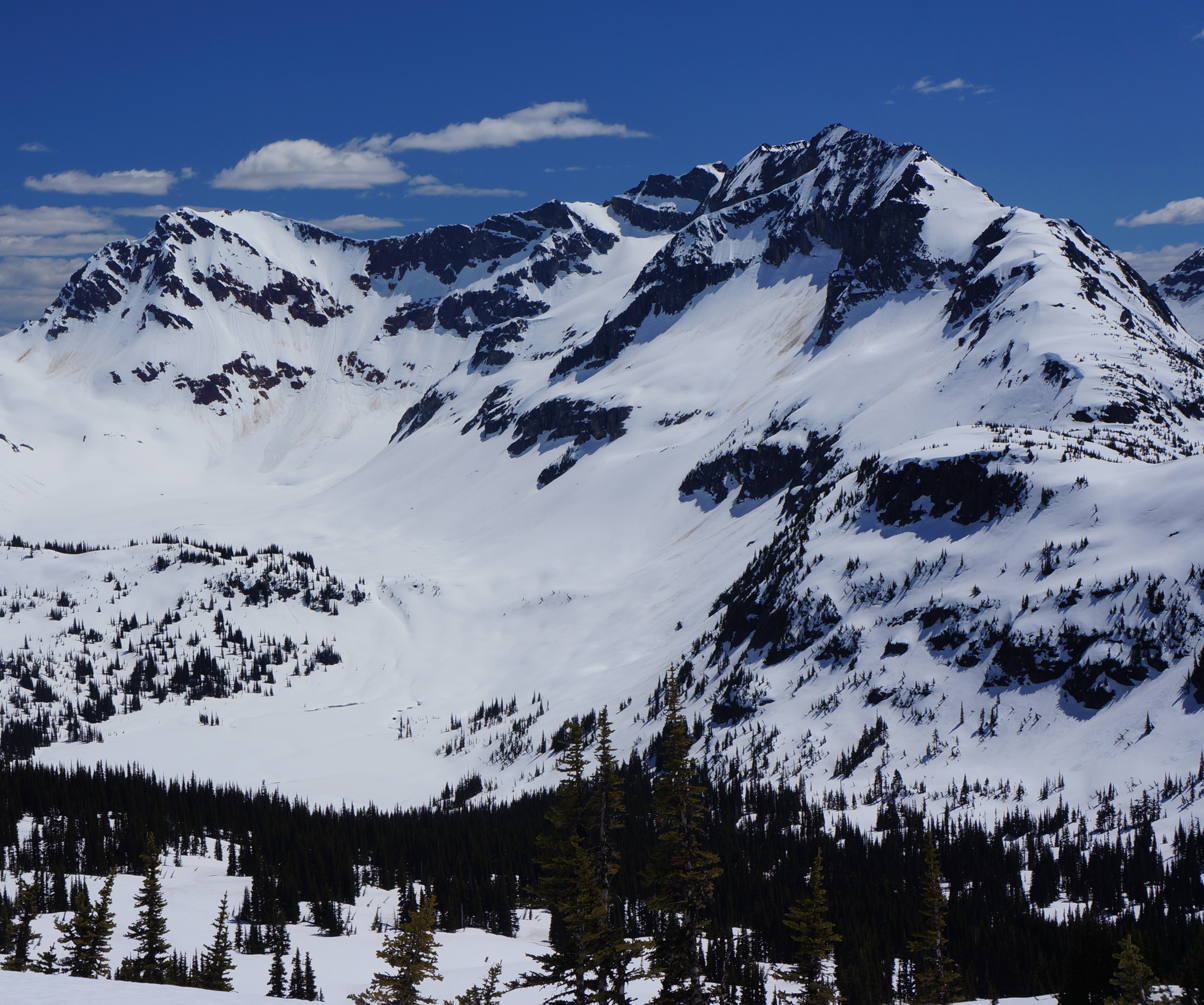
- Chiwawa Mountain from north

Highest point
- Elevation: 8,459 ft (2,578 m)
- Prominence: 1,219 ft (372 m)
- Parent peak: Fortress Mountain (8,760 ft)
- Isolation: 1.22 mi (1.96 km)
- Coordinates: 48°09′48″N 120°54′27″W

Geography
- Location within Washington (state) Location within the United States
- Country: United States of America
- State: Washington
- County: Chelan / Snohomish
- Protected area: Glacier Peak Wilderness
- Parent range: North Cascades; Cascade Range
- Topo map: USGS Suiattle Pass

Geology
- Rock age: Cretaceous
- Rock type: Biotite gneiss

Climbing
- First ascent: 1921 party of The Mountaineers led by Lorenz A. Nelson
- Easiest route: Scrambling

Chiwawa Mountain is an 8,459-foot (2,578-metre) mountain summit located in the Glacier Peak Wilderness of the North Cascades in Washington state. The mountain is situated on the crest of the Cascade Range, on the shared border of Snohomish County and Chelan County, also straddling the boundary between the Mount Baker-Snoqualmie National Forest and the Wenatchee National Forest. Its nearest higher peak is Fortress Mountain, 1.12 mi (1.80 km) to the west. Chiwawa Mountain is a triple divide peak, so precipitation runoff from it drains northeast to Lake Chelan via Railroad Creek; northwest into Miners Creek which is a tributary of the Suiattle River; and south into the Chiwawa River headwaters. The mountain's name is taken from the river's name, which was applied by Albert Hale Sylvester (1871-1944), a pioneer surveyor, explorer, topographer, and forest supervisor in the Cascades. Chiwawa comes from the Columbia-Moses language and means a kind of creek ("wawa" creek).

== Geology ==
Chiwawa Mountain is located in the Cloudy Pass batholith, an intrusive formation that was formed approximately 20 million years ago, during the early Miocene. During the Pleistocene period dating back over two million years ago, glaciation advancing and retreating repeatedly scoured and shaped the landscape. Remnants of the Lyman Glacier remain on the northeast slope of Chiwawa Mountain. Glaciation was most prevalent approximately 18,000 years ago, and most valleys were ice-free by 12,000 years ago. Uplift and faulting in combination with glaciation have been the dominant processes which have created the tall peaks and deep valleys of the North Cascades area. Subduction and tectonic activity in the area began during the late cretaceous period, about 90 million years ago. Extensive volcanic activity began to take place in the oligocene, about 35 million years ago. Glacier Peak, a stratovolcano that is 10.0 mi (16.1 km) southwest of Chiwawa Mountain, began forming in the mid-Pleistocene. Due to Glacier Peak's proximity to Chiwawa Mountain, volcanic ash is common in the area.

== Climate ==
Chiwawa Mountain is located in the marine west coast climate zone of western North America. Most weather fronts coming off the Pacific Ocean travel northeast toward the Cascade Mountains. As fronts approach the North Cascades, they are forced upward by the peaks of the Cascade Range (orographic lift), causing them to drop their moisture in the form of rain or snow onto the Cascades. As a result, the west side of the North Cascades experiences high precipitation, especially during the winter months in the form of snowfall. Because of maritime influence, snow tends to be wet and heavy, resulting in high avalanche danger. During winter months, weather is usually cloudy, but, due to high pressure systems over the Pacific Ocean that intensify during summer months, there is often little or no cloud cover during the summer. Due to its temperate climate and proximity to the Pacific Ocean, areas west of the Cascade Crest very rarely experience temperatures below 0 °F (−18 °C) or above 80 °F (27 °C).

== See also ==
- List of mountain peaks of Washington (state)

== Gallery ==
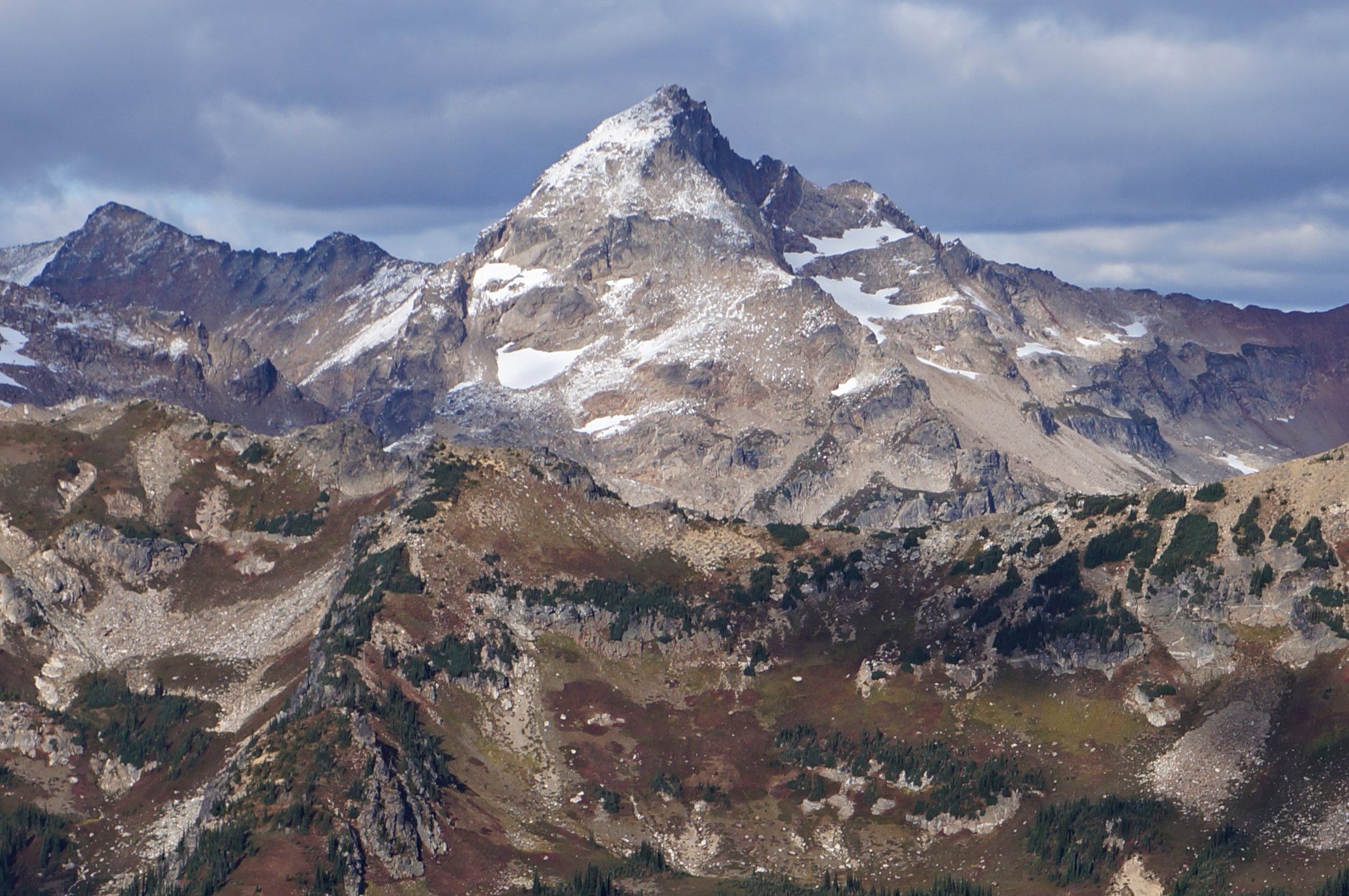
Chiwawa Mountain

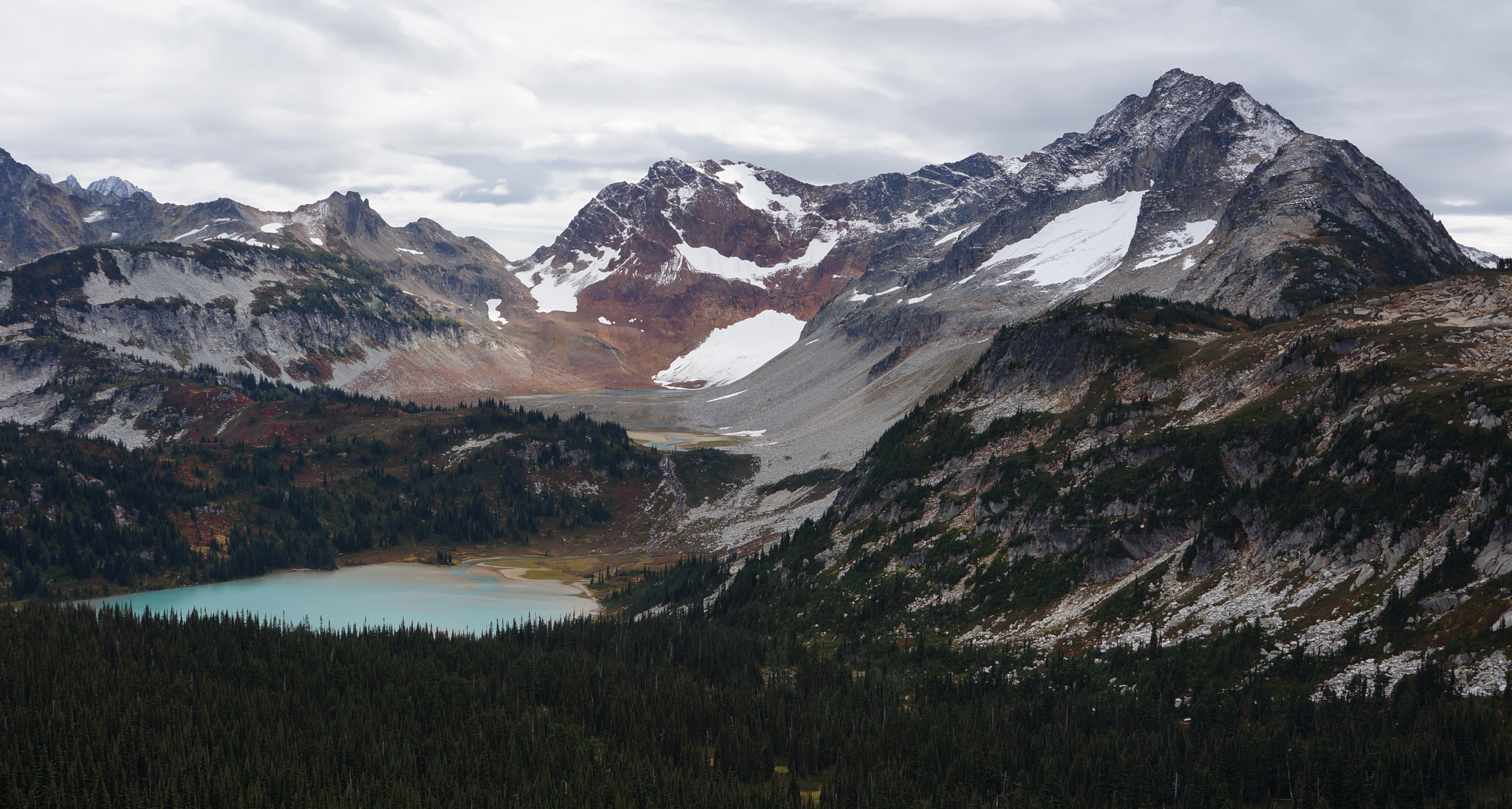
Chiwawa Mountain and Lyman Lake

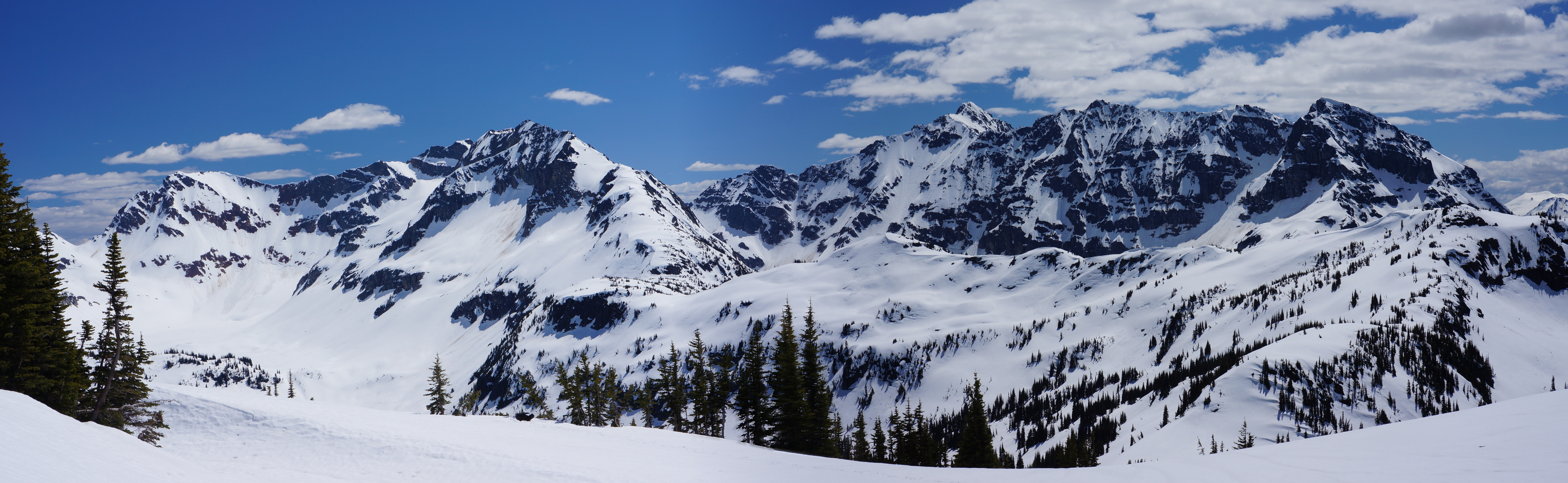
Chiwawa Mountain (left) with its parent, Fortress Mountain (right)
