= Napeequa River =

River in the United States of America

Coordinates: 47°55′15″N 120°53′47″W

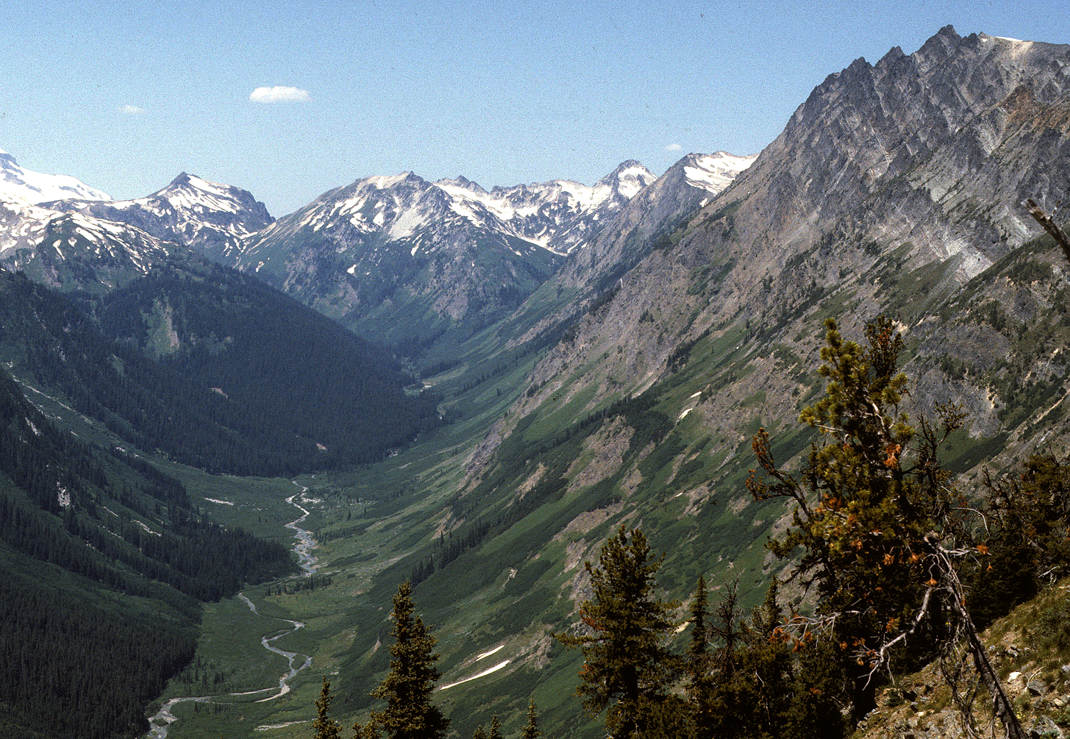
The Napeequa River as seen from Little Giant Pass

The Napeequa River is a 19-mile (31 km) long river in the U.S. state of Washington on the east side of the Cascade Range. It rises in northwest Chelan County and flows southwest into the White River near Twin Lakes. The White River flows into Lake Wenatchee. The Napeequa River and its valley are notable for their beauty and isolation, as well as their interesting geological history. It flows through an isolated southeast-trending valley characterized by a broad meadows surrounded by rugged mountains. The Chiwawa Mountains, or Chiwawa Ridge mark the east side of the valley, separating the Napeequa and Chiwawa Rivers. To the west the White Mountains separate the Napeequa from the White River. Both are sub-ranges of the Cascade Range.

The river is part of the Columbia River basin, being a tributary of the White River, which joins the Wenatchee River, a tributary of the Columbia River.

A large number of place names in the Napeequa River basin, including the river's name itself, were given by Albert H. Sylvester.

== Course ==
The Napeequa River flows from Butterfly Glacier in the Glacier Peak Wilderness. It flows west briefly then enters its main southeast-trending valley. Near the head of the valley the Napeequa is joined by a south-flowing tributary originating near High Pass. Flowing southeast through its valley the Napeequa is joined by Louis Creek from the north, then an unnamed stream flowing east from Pliz Glacier and Richardson Glacier. Numerous small streams tumble down the Napeequa valley's high slopes. The valley widens and flattens considerably and the river meanders lazily. Hiking trails enter the valley via Boulder Pass and Little Giant Pass (both over 6,400 ft (2,000 m) high–the valley floor is about 4,000 ft (1,200 m) high in this vicinity), crossing the White Mountains and Chiwawa Ridge respectively. Many backpackers bushwhack from or to High Pass/Triad Lake just north of the headwaters of the Napeequa. There are no trails into the valley that do not cross a high pass. Downstream the valley narrows for some distance, then widens again. Many tributaries flow down the steep slopes on both sides of the glacial valley. In its last mile the Napeequa turns west to join the White River. It is joined by Lake Creek from the south, which drains Twin Lakes.

The Napeequa Valley continues southeast from Twin Lakes but it occupied by Big Meadow Creek, a tributary of the Chiwawa River. Big Meadow Creek was probably once a tributary of the Napeequa but was captured by the Chiwawa. The Napeequa Valley has been compared to the fabled Shangri-La. The valley is part of the Glacier Peak Wilderness.

== Geologic history ==
Fred Beckey calls the Napeequa River valley the "most interesting valley" of the region. It is a classical glacier-carved U-shaped trough, flat bottomed and nearly straight. Its present form was created by a Pleistocene era glacier. The lower valley is so broad and flat the Napeequa River meanders slowly through it. Near Twin Lakes the Napeequa makes an abrupt westward turn, leaving its valley through a steep gorge cut through the gneiss rock of the 6,500 feet (2,000 m) high ridge between the Napeequa and White River valleys. Big Meadow Creek occupies the southern part of the same glacial-carved valley, flowing southeast to the Chiwawa River. It is probable that the Napeequa River used to flow through the entire valley including the southern end now occupied by Big Meadow Creek. It is also likely that as the ice retreated a large lake formed in the valley.

== History ==
The river was once called the North Fork of the White River. Forest Service supervisor A.H. Sylvester changed the name to Napeequa, a Salishan word meaning white water, because the river's water is nearly white in the spring and summer due to heavy glacial silt. According to William Bright the name comes "perhaps a Sinkiuse-Columbia word meaning white water place."

== See also ==
- List of rivers of Washington (state)
- List of tributaries of the Columbia River
