= Chiwawa River =

- Location of the mouth of the Chiwawa River in Washington Chiwawa River (the United States)

Location
- Country: United States
- State: Washington
- County: Chelan

Physical characteristics
- Source: North Cascades
  - location: Entiat Mountains
  - coordinates: 48°9′11″N 120°55′2″W
  - elevation: 6,300 ft (1,900 m)
- Mouth: Wenatchee River
  - coordinates: 47°47′18″N 120°39′32″W
  - elevation: 1,844 ft (562 m)
- Length: 37 mi (60 km)
- Basin size: 183 sq mi (470 km^{2})
- Discharge
  - location: near mouth
  - average: 509 cu ft/s (14.4 m^{3}/s)
  - minimum: 45 cu ft/s (1.3 m^{3}/s)
  - maximum: 7,030 cu ft/s (199 m^{3}/s)

The Chiwawa River is a tributary of the Wenatchee River, in the U.S. state of Washington. It is completely contained within Chelan County.

Much of the Chiwawa River's drainage basin is designated national forest and wilderness. The upper Chiwawa watershed is in nearly pristine condition.

The river is part of the Columbia River basin, being a tributary of the Wenatchee River, which is a tributary to the Columbia River.

The river's name comes from a Columbia-Moses term meaning of kind of creek ("wawa" creek). A large number of place names in the Chiwawa River basin were given by Albert H. Sylvester.

== Course ==
The Chiwawa River originates in the Glacier Peak Wilderness of the North Cascades, on the southern slopes of Chiwawa Mountain and Fortress Mountain. It flows south through the Wenatchee National Forest, between Chiwawa Ridge to the west and the Entiat Mountains to the east.

The Chiwawa River empties into the Wenatchee River several miles east of Lake Wenatchee.

== See also ==
- List of rivers in Washington
- Tributaries of the Columbia River
