= Glacier Peak Wilderness =

Wilderness area in the central Cascades of Washington state

- IUCN category Ib (wilderness area)
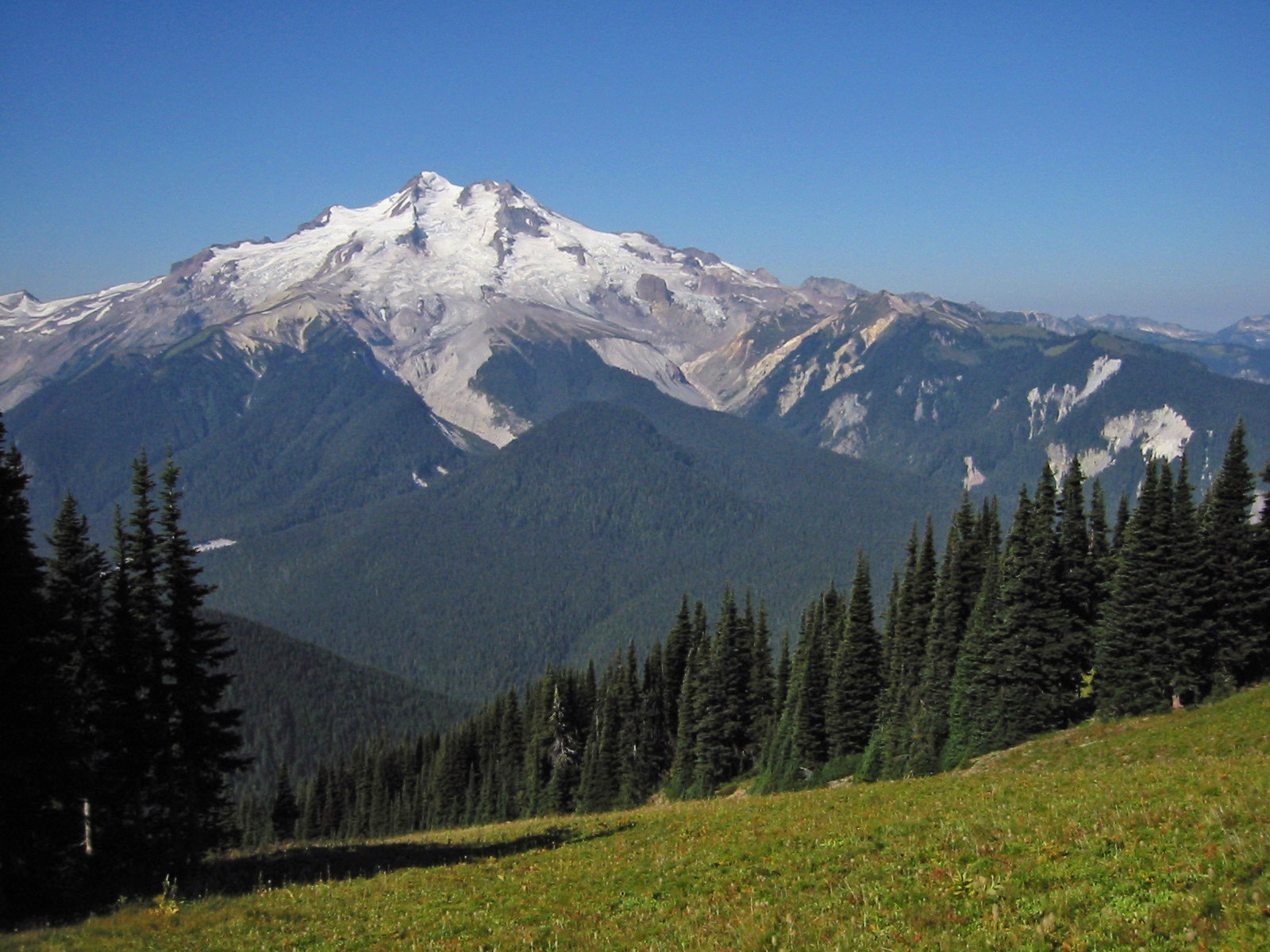
- Glacier Peak, 10,541 feet (3,213 m)]

- Location within the United States
- Location: Chelan / Snohomish / Skagit counties, Washington, USA
- Nearest city: Seattle, WA
- Coordinates: 48°06′45″N 121°06′50″W
- Area: 566,057 acres (2,290.75 km^{2})
- Established: 1964
- Governing body: U.S. Forest Service

Glacier Peak Wilderness is a 566,057-acre (229,075 ha), 35-mile-long (56 km), 20-mile-wide (32 km) wilderness area located within portions of Chelan, Snohomish, and Skagit counties in the North Cascades of Washington. The area lies within parts of Wenatchee National Forest and Mount Baker National Forest and is characterized by heavily forested stream courses, steep-sided valleys, and dramatic glacier-crowned peaks. The dominant geologic feature of the area is 10,541-foot (3,213 m) Glacier Peak. It is the most remote major volcanic peak in the Cascade Range and is the third most heavily glaciated volcano in the lower forty-eight states behind Mount Rainier and Mount Baker. Glacier Peak is a volcanic cone of basalt, pumice, and ash which erupted during periods of heavy glaciation.

== History ==
Glacier Peak Wilderness was created by the U.S. Forest Service in 1960 through the efforts of the North Cascades Conservation Council, four years before the 1964 wilderness legislation of the Congress.

== Ecology ==
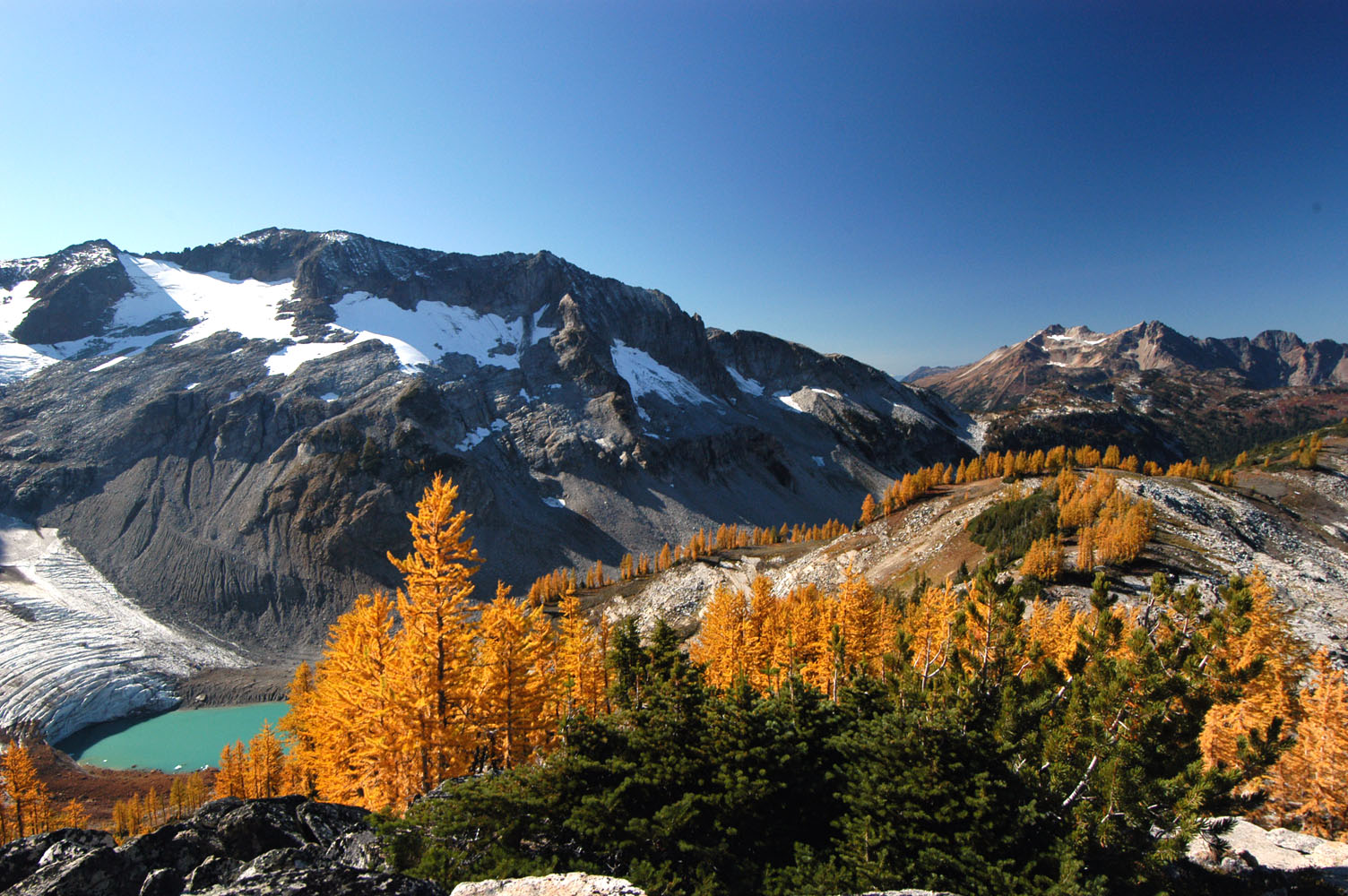
Lyman Lake and Larix lyallii

Forest vegetation comprises several species of fir, Douglas fir, hemlock, red cedar as well as stands of mixed pine and Douglas fir on its eastern slopes. Various species of wildlife inhabit the area and include deer, elk, black bear, mountain goat, cougar, marten, and lynx. Smaller animals, such as field mice are common. The last confirmed grizzly bear sighting in the United States portion of the North Cascade ecosystem occurred in this wilderness. The high mountain lakes often give good catches of fish during their ice-free months. The primary fishery is cutthroat trout, however, other species do exist.

== Access ==
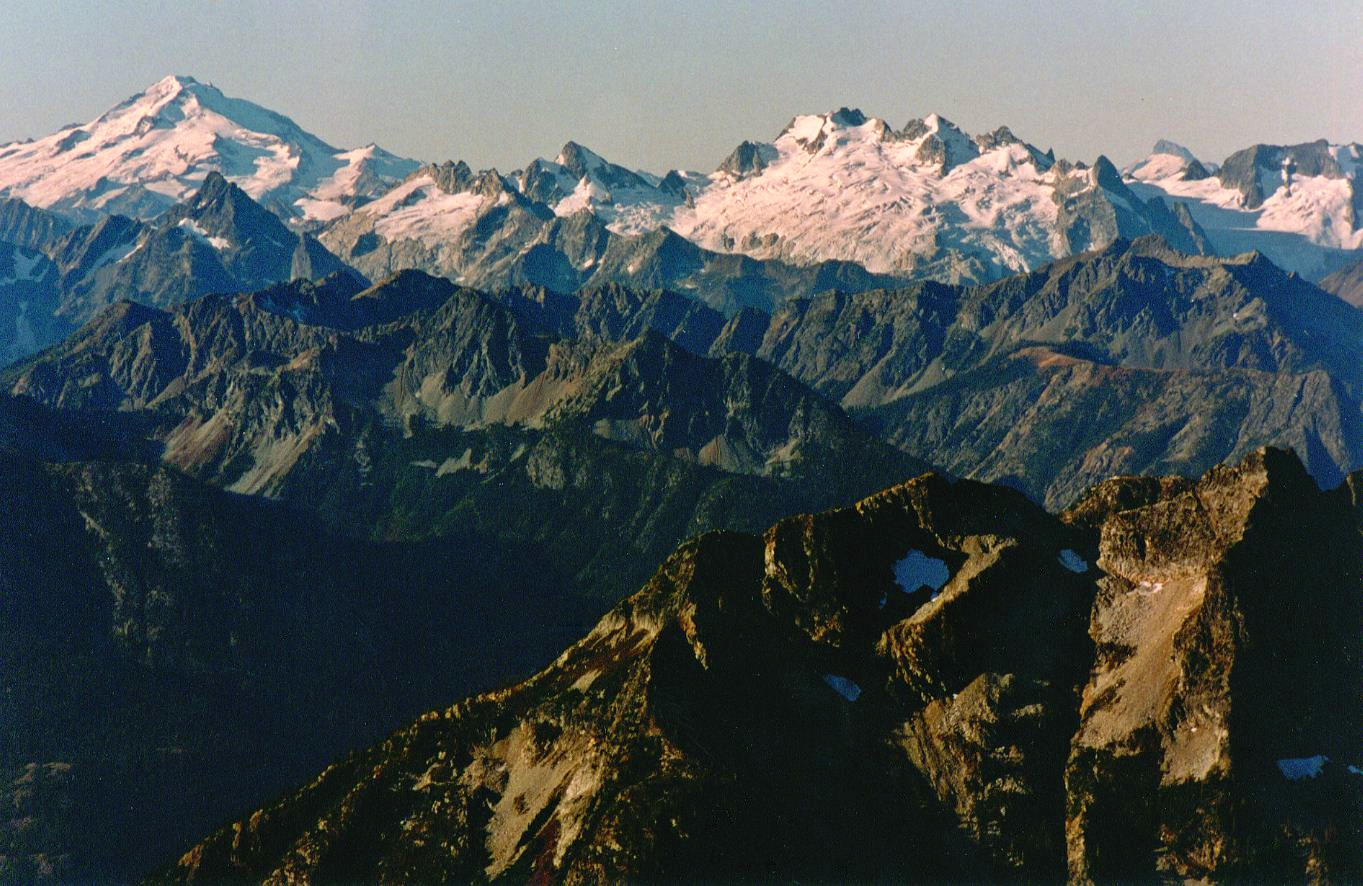
Glacier Peak Wilderness

No roads approach Glacier Peak, and many miles of hiking through extremely rough terrain are required to reach its base. Normally, hikers can reach the volcano from the west via the White Chuck River Valley, or the Suiattle River Valley; from the east, it may be approached from the western tip of Lake Chelan or the White River or Chiwawa River valleys.

== Trail conditions ==
Most years the wilderness is still buried under 10 to 20 feet (300 to 600 cm) of snow in May. Usually most trails and passes are snow free by mid-August, but this varies from year to year. Snow and cold rain can occur in mid-summer.

== See also ==
- Dome Peak
- Image Lake
- Ptarmigan Traverse
- Encounters with the Archdruid
