= List of mountains of the United States =

Coordinates: 63.0690°N 151.0063°W

This list includes significant mountain peaks located in the United States arranged alphabetically by state, district, or territory. The highest peak in each state, district or territory is noted in bold. For state high points that are not mountains, see List of U.S. states and territories by elevation.

== Significant mountain peaks and high points ==
=== Alabama ===
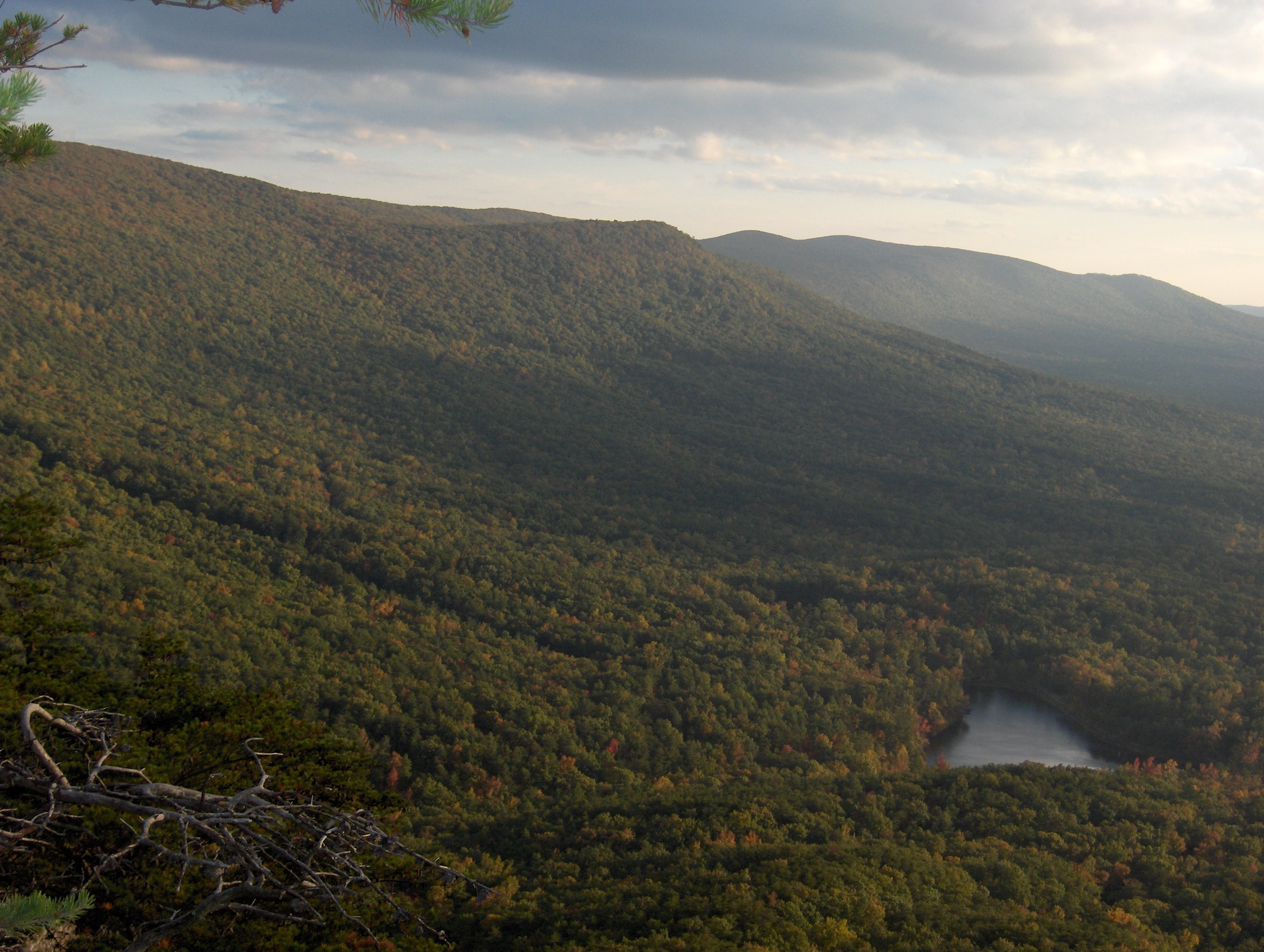
Cheaha Mountain

- Brindley Mountain
- **Cheaha Mountain**, highest summit in the State of Alabama
- Monte Sano Mountain
- Capshaw Mountain
- Dirtseller Mountain
- Frog Mountain
- Hawk Pride Mountain
- Gunters Mountain
- Sand Mountain (Alabama)
- Keel Mountain (Alabama)
- Halama Mountain

=== Alaska ===
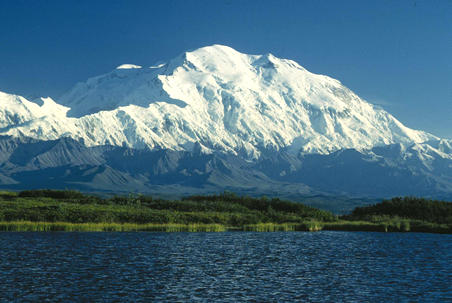
Denali

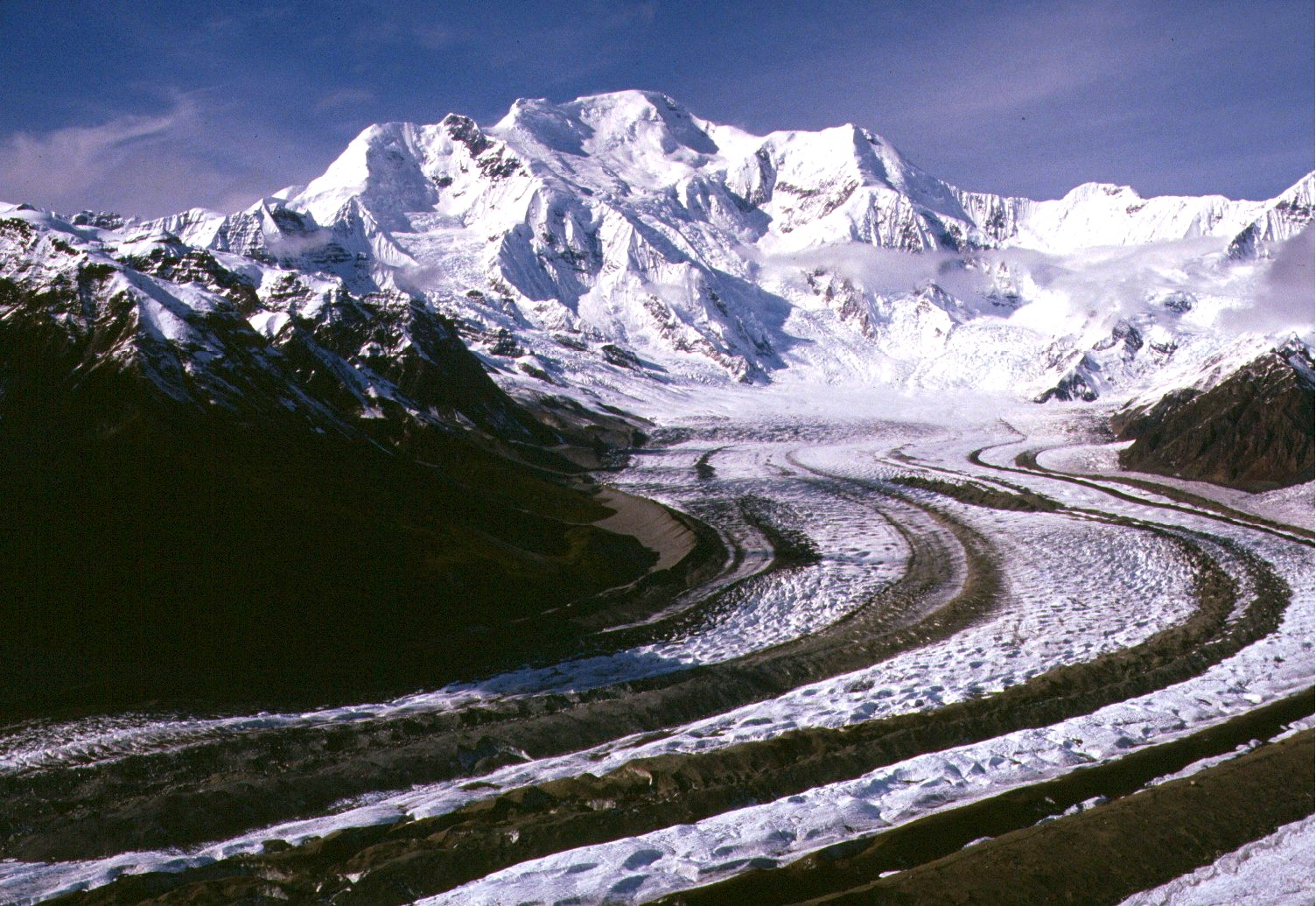
Mount Blackburn

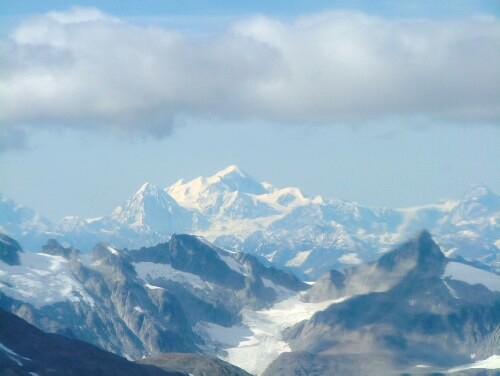
Mount Fairweather

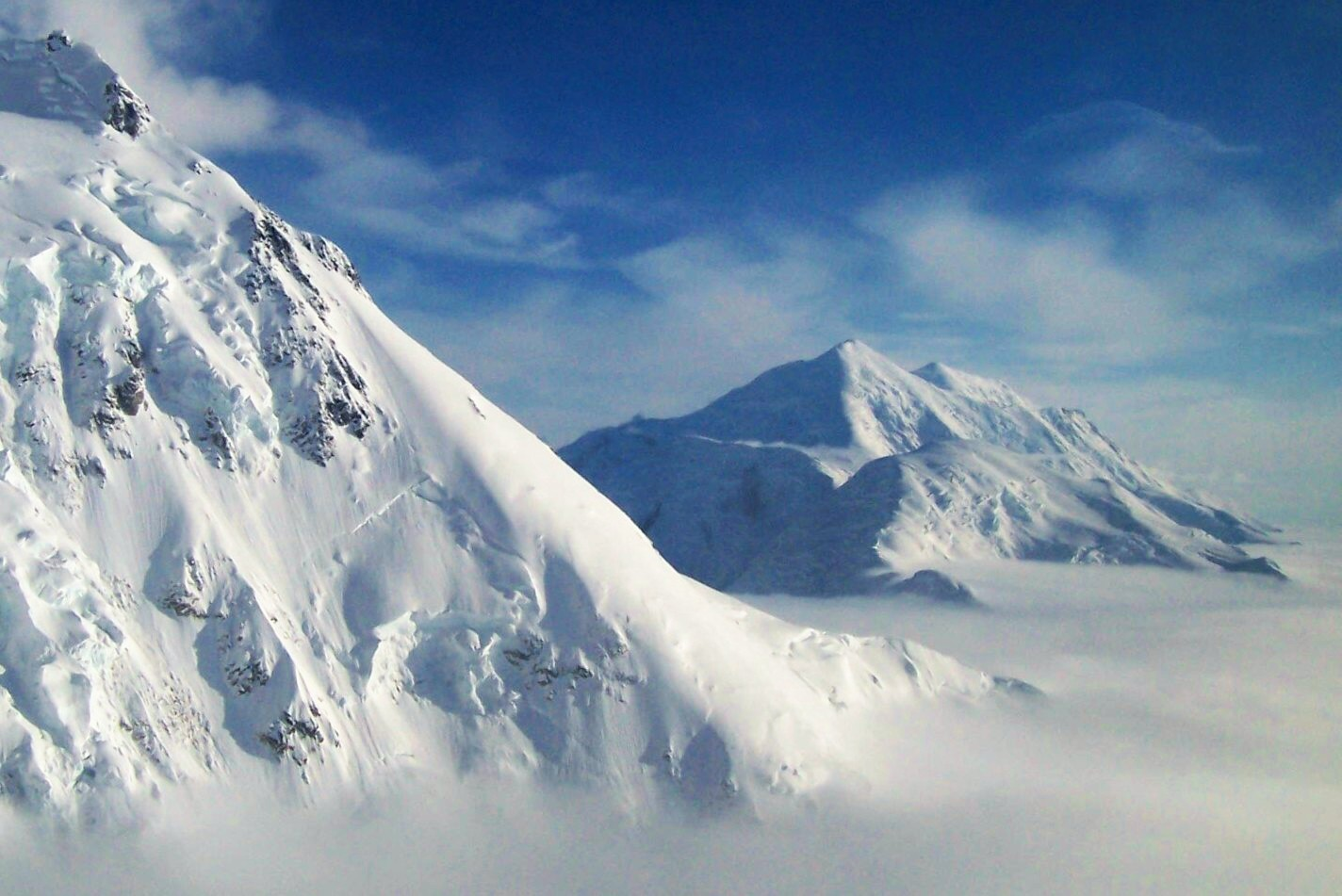
Mount Foraker

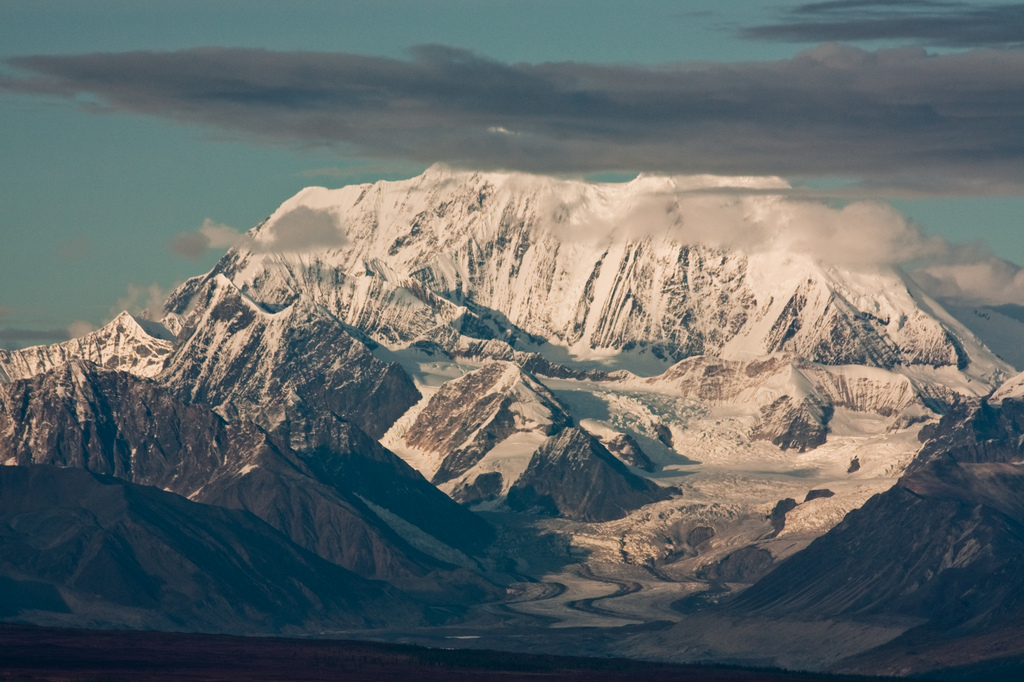
Mount Hayes

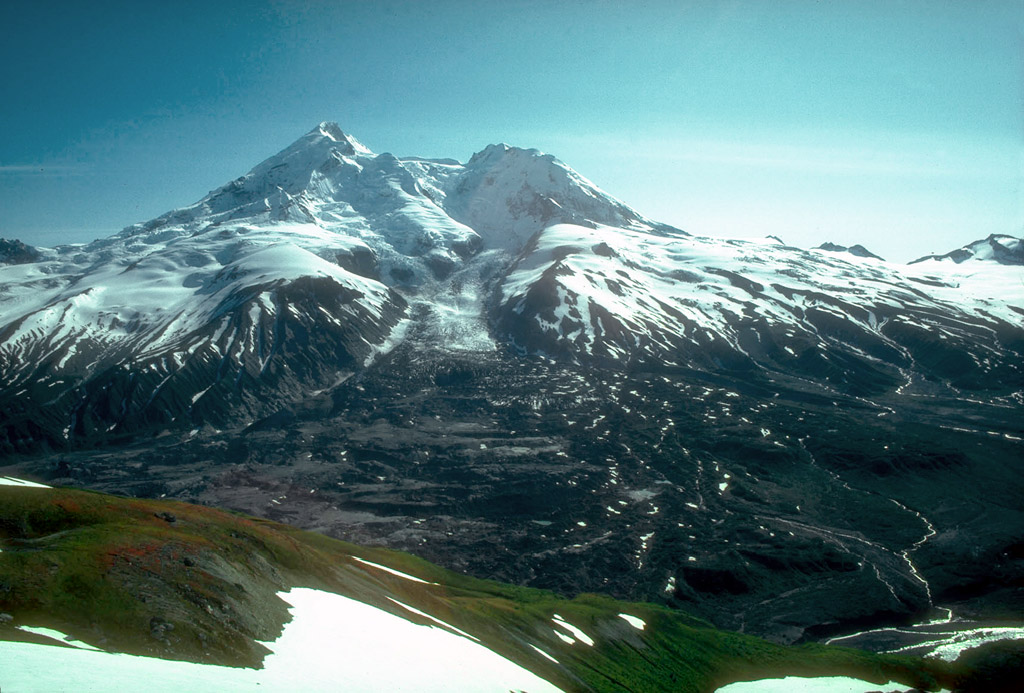
Mount Redoubt

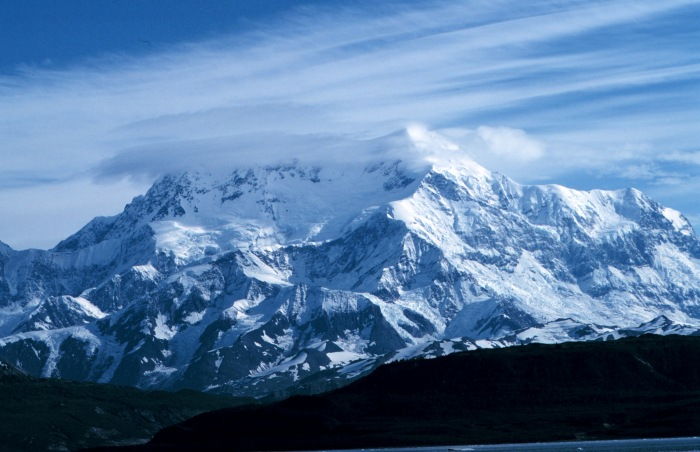
Mount Saint Elias

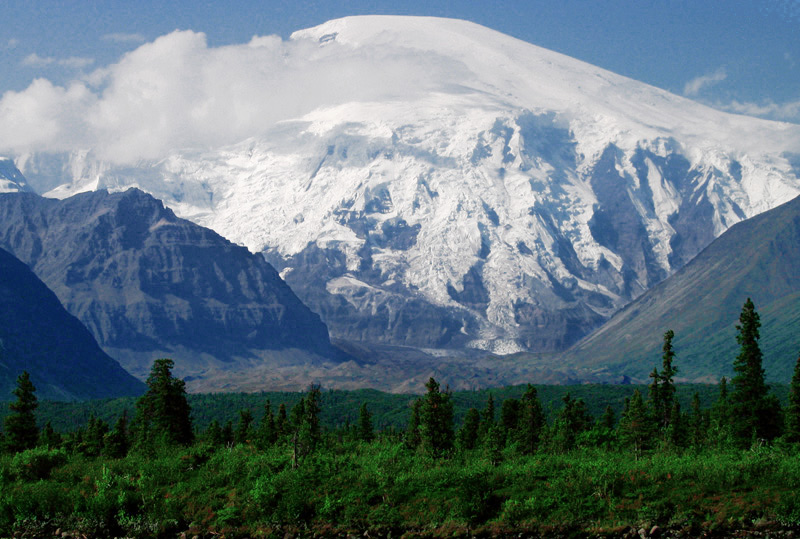
Mount Sanford

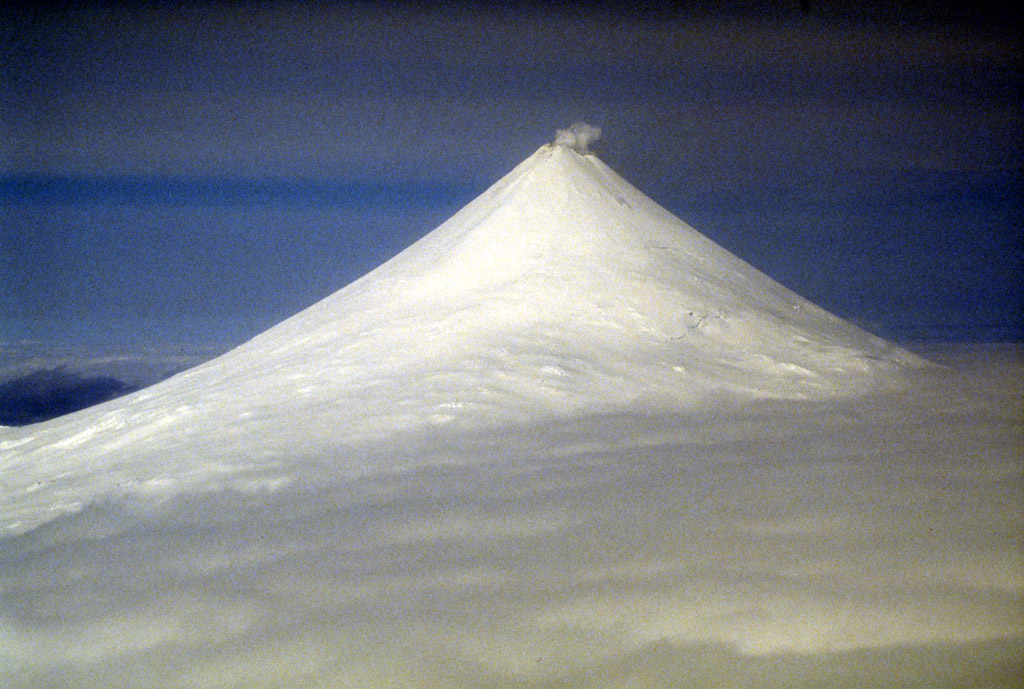
Mount Shishaldin

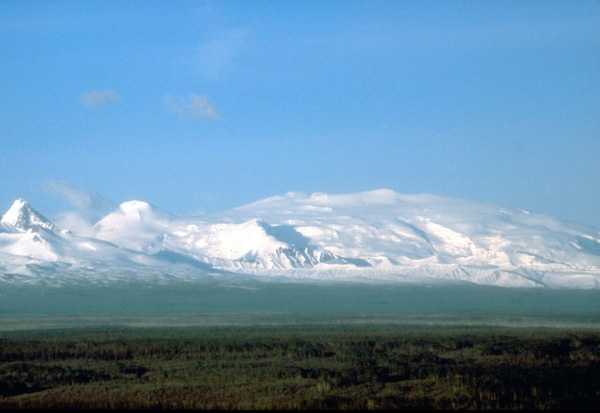
Mount Wrangell

- Afognak Mountain, summit of Afognak Island
- Alabaster Peak
- Alagogshak
- Amak Volcano, active stratovolcano
- Amherst Peak
- Amulet Peak
- Andy Simons Mountain
- Annex Peak
- Anvil Peak NGS PB, active stratovolcano that forms the summit of Semisopochnoi Island
- Arthur Peak
- Asses Ears (Alaska)
- Atna Peaks PB
- Atuk Mountain PB, summit of St. Lawrence Island
- Audubon Mountain
- Augustine Volcano, active lava dome that forms the summit of Augustine Island
- Auke Mountain
- Awesome Peak
- Baranof Island High Point PB, summit of Baranof Island
- Bard Peak
- Barometer Mountain
- Bashful Peak
- Bear Mountain
- Begich Peak
- Bellicose Peak
- Benign Peak
- Birds Eye Peak
- Black Cap Mountain
- Black Mountain
- Black Mountain PB, highest summit of the De Long Mountains
- Black Peak
- Blacktail Ptarmigan Rocks
- Blackthorn Peak
- Boggs Peak
- Bonanza Peak
- Buldir Volcano PB, stratovolcano that forms the summit of Buldir Island
- Bullard Mountain
- Bullion Mountain
- Calliope Mountain
- Cantata Peak
- Carlisle Peak, active stratovolcano that forms the summit of Carlisle Island
- Carpathian Peak
- Castle Mountain
- Castle Peak
- Cathedral Peak
- Cecil Rhode Mountain
- Ch'akajabena Mountain
- Chichagof Island High Point, summit of Chichagof Island
- Chitistone Mountain
- Cleveland Volcano NGS PB, active stratovolcano that forms the summit of Chuginadak Island
- Cloud Peak PB, highest summit of the Philip Smith Mountains
- Cold Bay Volcano
- Columbia Peak
- Cope Mountain
- Copter Peak
- De Long Mountains High Point PB
- Debauch Mountain PB
- **Denali** (Mount McKinley) PB, highest summit of the Alaska Range, the State of Alaska, the United States of America, and all of North America
- Denmark Peak
- Devils Paw PB
- Devils Prongs
- Dike Mountain
- Dillingham High Point PB
- Dillon Mountain
- Divide Mountain
- Donoho Peak
- Double Mountain
- Double Peak
- Doublemint Peak
- Eagle Peak, on Admiralty Island
- Eagle Peak, in Chugach Mountains
- East Peak
- Eickelberg Peak
- Ellamar Mountain
- Emperor Peak
- Face Mountain
- Fang Mountain
- Fifty Years of Alaskan Statehood
- Finland Peak
- Fireweed Mountain
- Flat Top Mountain (Sitka City and Borough, Alaska)
- Flattop Mountain (Anchorage, Alaska)
- Frosty Peak PB, stratovolcano
- Girls Mountain
- Glacier King
- Goat Mountain
- Goat Mountain
- Government Peak
- Granite Peak
- Granite Range High Point PB
- Great Nunatak
- Great Sitkin Volcano PB, active stratovolcano that forms the summit of Great Sitkin Island
- Guardian Mountain
- Gullied Peak
- Gunsight Mountain
- Hanagita Peak NGS PB
- Haydon Peak
- Hearth Mountain
- Heintzleman Ridge
- Heney Peak
- Hess Mountain
- Highbush Peak
- Higher Spire
- Hinchinbrook Island High Point, summit of Hinchinbrook Island
- Hogback Ridge
- Horn Spire
- Ice Cream Cone Mountain
- Icy Peak
- Igloo Mountain
- Institute Peak
- Isanotski Peaks PB, stratovolcano
- Isthmus Peak PB
- Jewel Mountain
- Joshua Green Peak
- Kahiltna Queen
- Kates Needle PB
- Kejulik Volcano
- Kichatna Spire PB
- Kings Mountain
- Kiska Volcano PB
- Knight Island High Point, summit of Knight Island
- Koniag Peak PB, summit of Kodiak Island
- Korovin Volcano PB, active stratovolcano forms the summit of Atka Island
- Kupreanof Mountain
- Kusilvak High Point PB
- Lindita Peak
- Lingon Mountain
- Lion Head
- Lions Head Mountain
- London Tower
- Lowell Peak
- Lowell Peak (Chugach Mountains)
- Lynx Peak
- Makushin Volcano PB, active stratovolcano
- Mammary Peak
- Mangy Hill
- Marble Mountain
- Matanuska Peak
- Maynard Mountain
- McGinnis Mountain
- McGinnis Peak
- McHugh Peak
- Mentasta Mountains High Point PB
- Meteorite Mountain
- Mile High Peak
- Moby Dick
- Montague Island High Point, summit of Montague Island
- Mount Abbe
- Mount Abdallah
- Mount Ada
- Mount Adagdak, stratovolcano
- Mount Adair
- Mount Adolph Knopf
- Mount Akutan PB, active stratovolcano that forms the summit of Akutan Island
- Mount Aleutka
- Mount Alice
- Mount Allen
- Mount Alpenglow
- Mount Alverstone PB
- Mount Amukta, active stratovolcano
- Mount Angayukaqsraq PB, highest summit of the Baird Mountains
- Mount Aniakchak, active stratovolcano
- Mount Ascension
- Mount Augusta PB
- Mount Bagot
- Mount Balchen
- Mount Ballyhoo
- Mount Barrille
- Mount Bassie
- Mount Bayard
- Mount Bear PB
- Mount Becharof
- Mount Bendeleben
- Mount Benson
- Mount Bertha
- Mount Blachnitzky
- Mount Blackburn NGS PB, highest summit of the Wrangell Mountains
- Mount Bona PB
- Mount Bradley
- Mount Bradley (Mount Jumbo)
- Mount Burkett
- Mount Cameron
- Mount Carlisle, active stratovolcano
- Mount Carmack
- Mount Case
- Mount Castner
- Mount Chamberlin PB, highest summit of the Brooks Range and the Arctic United States
- Mount Chichantna
- Mount Chiginagak PB, active stratovolcano
- Mount Chitina
- Mount Cook (Saint Elias Mountains) PB
- Mount Cooper
- Mount Crillon PB
- Mount Dagelet
- Mount Deborah PB
- Mount Dan Fox
- Mount Dech
- Mount Defiant
- Mount Doonerak
- Mount Doran
- Mount Douglas PB, active stratovolcano
- Mount Drum PB, stratovolcano
- Mount Dutton, active stratovolcano
- Mount Edgecumbe, stratovolcano that forms the summit of Kruzof Island
- Mount Edison
- Mount Eielson
- Mount Einstein
- Mount Eleanor
- Mount Elusive
- Mount Emmerich
- Mount Emmons
- Mount Ernest Gruening
- Mount Etolin, summit of Etolin Island
- Mount Eva
- Mount Fairweather (Fairweather Mountain) PB
- Mount Favorite
- Mount Fellows
- Mount Foraker PB
- Mount Forde
- Mount Foresta PB
- Mount Frances
- Mount Francis
- Mount Gakona
- Mount Gareloi, active stratovolcano that forms the summit of Gareloi Island. Westernmost ultra-prominent summit of greater North America.
- Mount Geist
- Mount Gerdine
- Mount Gilbert, volcano that forms the summit of Akun Island
- Mount Gilbert (Chugach Mountains)
- Mount Glenn
- Mount Golub
- Mount Goode
- Mount Grace
- Mount Griggs PB, active stratovolcano
- Mount Grosvenor
- Mount Grosvenor (Alaska Range)
- Mount Harding
- Mount Harper PB
- Mount Hawkins
- Mount Hayes PB, stratovolcano remnant
- Mount Healy
- Mount Hesperus PB
- Mount Hogan
- Mount Hubbard PB
- Mount Hunter PB
- Mount Huntington
- Mount Huxley
- Mount Igikpak PB, highest summit of the Schwatka Mountains
- Mount Iliamna, active stratovolcano
- Mount Jarvis PB
- Mount Johnson
- Mount Juneau
- Mount Kagamil, active stratovolcano that forms the summit of Kagamil Island
- Mount Kaguyak, stratovolcano
- Mount Kanaga, active stratovolcano that forms the summit of Kanaga Island
- Mount Katmai, active stratovolcano
- Mount Kialagvik
- Mount Kiev, highest summit of the Endicott Mountains
- Mount Kimball PB
- Mount Kiska, active stratovolcano that forms the summit of Kiska Island
- Mount Klooch
- Mount Kudlich
- Mount La Perouse
- Mount Laurens
- Mount Leeper
- Mount Leland
- Mount Madson
- Mount Mageik, active volcano
- Mount Magnificent
- Mount Marcus Baker PB
- Mount Margaret
- Mount Martin, active stratovolcano
- Mount Mary
- Mount Mather PB
- Mount McGhan
- Mount McGinnis
- Mount Merriam
- Mount Michelson (Brooks Range)
- Mount Michelson (Chugach Mountains)
- Mount Miller PB
- Mount Moffett, stratovolcano that forms the summit of Adak Island
- Mount Muir
- Mount Nagishlamina
- Mount Natazhat PB
- Mount Neacola PB
- Mount Newhall
- Mount Ogilvie
- Mount Okmok, active shield volcano
- Mount O'Neel
- Mount Osborn NGS PB
- Mount Palmer
- Mount Parker
- Mount Pavlof PB, active stratovolcano
- Mount POW/MIA
- Mount Prindle PB
- Mount Queena
- Mount Quincy Adams (Fairweather Range)
- Mount Recheshnoi, active stratovolcano
- Mount Redoubt NGS PB, active stratovolcano that forms the highest summit of the Chigmit Mountains
- Mount Reed
- Mount Reid, summit of Revillagigedo Island
- Mount Ripinski
- Mount Robert Barron
- Mount Roberts
- Mount Rumble
- Mount Russell PB
- Mount Sabine
- Mount Saint Elias PB, highest summit of Wrangell-St. Elias National Park and Preserve and the second highest summit of both the United States and Canada
- Mount Sanford PB, volcano
- Mount Seattle PB
- Mount Seguam, active stratovolcano
- Mount Shand
- Mount Sheldon
- Mount Shishaldin PB, active stratovolcano that forms the summit of Unimak Island
- Mount Shouplina
- Mount Silverthrone PB
- Mount Silvertip
- Mount Skarland
- Mount Spurr, active stratovolcano
- Mount Steller (Chugach Mountains) NGS PB, stratovolcano
- Mount Stepo
- Mount Sumdum
- Mount Susitna
- Mount Thomas
- Mount Tlingit
- Mount Tlingit Ankawoo
- Mount Tom White
- Mount Torbert PB
- Mount Tozi PB
- Mount Turner
- Mount Vancouver
- Mount Veniaminof PB, active stratovolcano
- Mount Vsevidof PB, active stratovolcano that forms the summit of Umnak Island
- Mount Wake
- Mount Watson
- Mount Westdahl, active volcano
- Mount Wickersham
- Mount Williams
- Mount Williwaw
- Mount Witherspoon
- Mount Wordie
- Mount Wrangell PB, active shield volcano
- Mount Wrather
- Mount Yeatman
- Mount Yukla
- Mustang Peak
- Northbird
- Novarupta, active lava dome
- Nugget Mountain
- Nugget Towers
- Nun Mountain
- Observation Peak
- O'Malley Peak
- Paradise Peak
- Passage Peak
- Pavlof Sister, stratovolcano
- Peak 5390
- Peak 6200
- Peak 6915
- Peak 8010 PB
- Peak 8084 PB
- Peak 8336 PB
- Peak 8488 PB
- Pease Peak
- Penguin Peak
- Peril Peak
- Phoenix Peak
- Pilot Peak
- Pioneer Peak
- Pogromni Volcano NGS PB
- Polar Bear Peak
- Polychrome Mountain
- Porphyry Mountain
- Portage Peak
- Porter Peak
- Poss Mountain
- Prince of Wales Island High Point PB, summit of Prince of Wales Island
- Princess Peak
- Ptarmigan Peak (Baranof Island)
- Ptarmigan Peak (Chugach Mountains)
- Pyramid Mountain (Alaska Range)
- Pyramid Mountain
- Pyramid Peak
- Pyramid Peak, on Unalaska Island
- Pyre Peak PB, summit of Seguam Island
- Radio Control Tower
- Ragged Peak
- Raggedtop Mountain
- Rainbow Mountain
- Regal Mountain NGS PB
- Resurrection Peaks
- Rhino Peak
- Rook Mountain
- Royal Tower
- Sable Mountain
- Sanak Peak, summit of Sanak Island
- Santa Ana Peak
- Scott Peak
- Segula Peak, stratovolcano that forms the summit of Segula Island
- Sentinel Peak
- Serrated Peak
- Shakespeare Shoulder
- Sheep Mountain
- Sheep Mountain (Kenai Mountains)
- Shishaldin Volcano, see Mount Shishaldin
- Sinclair Mountain
- Skyscraper Mountain
- Slanting Peak
- Slope Mountain (Chigmit Mountains)
- Snider Peak
- Snowden Mountain
- Snowpatch Crag
- Snow Tower PB
- Sourdough Peak
- Sovereign Mountain PB
- Spearmint Spire
- Split Thumb
- Stroller White Mountain
- Sugar Loaf Mountain
- Sukakpak Mountain
- Sweden Peak
- Tail Feather Peak
- Taku Towers
- Tanada Peak
- Tanaga Volcano PB, active stratovolcano that forms the summit of Tanaga Island
- Tazcol Peak
- Tazlina Tower
- Telaquana Mountain
- Temptation Peak
- The Mitre
- The Ramp
- The Rooster Comb
- The Rowel
- The Sisters
- The Snow Towers
- The Tusk
- The Wedge
- Thibedeau Mountain
- Tiehacker Mountain
- Tikishla Peak
- Tlingit Peak
- Tokosha Mountains
- Tressider Peak PB
- Trident Volcano PB, active stratovolcano
- Triplemint Peak
- Troublemint Peak
- Truuli Peak PB
- Tukgahgo Mountain
- Twin Peaks
- Ugashik-Peulik, active stratovolcano
- Ultima Thule Peak
- University Peak PB
- Vigesimal Peak
- Virginia Peak
- Vista Peak
- West Saint Peak
- Whitecrown
- Whiteout Peak
- Wiki Peak
- Williams Peak
- Wolverine Peak
- Yantarni Volcano

=== American Samoa ===
- A'oloaufou
- **Lata Mountain**, summit of the Island of Ta‘ū and the highest summit of the Territory of American Samoa
- Matafao Peak, summit of the Island of Tutuila
- Mount Piumafua, summit of the Island of Olosega
- Rainmaker Mountain (North Pioa Mountain)
- Tumu, summit of the Island of Ofu

=== Arizona ===
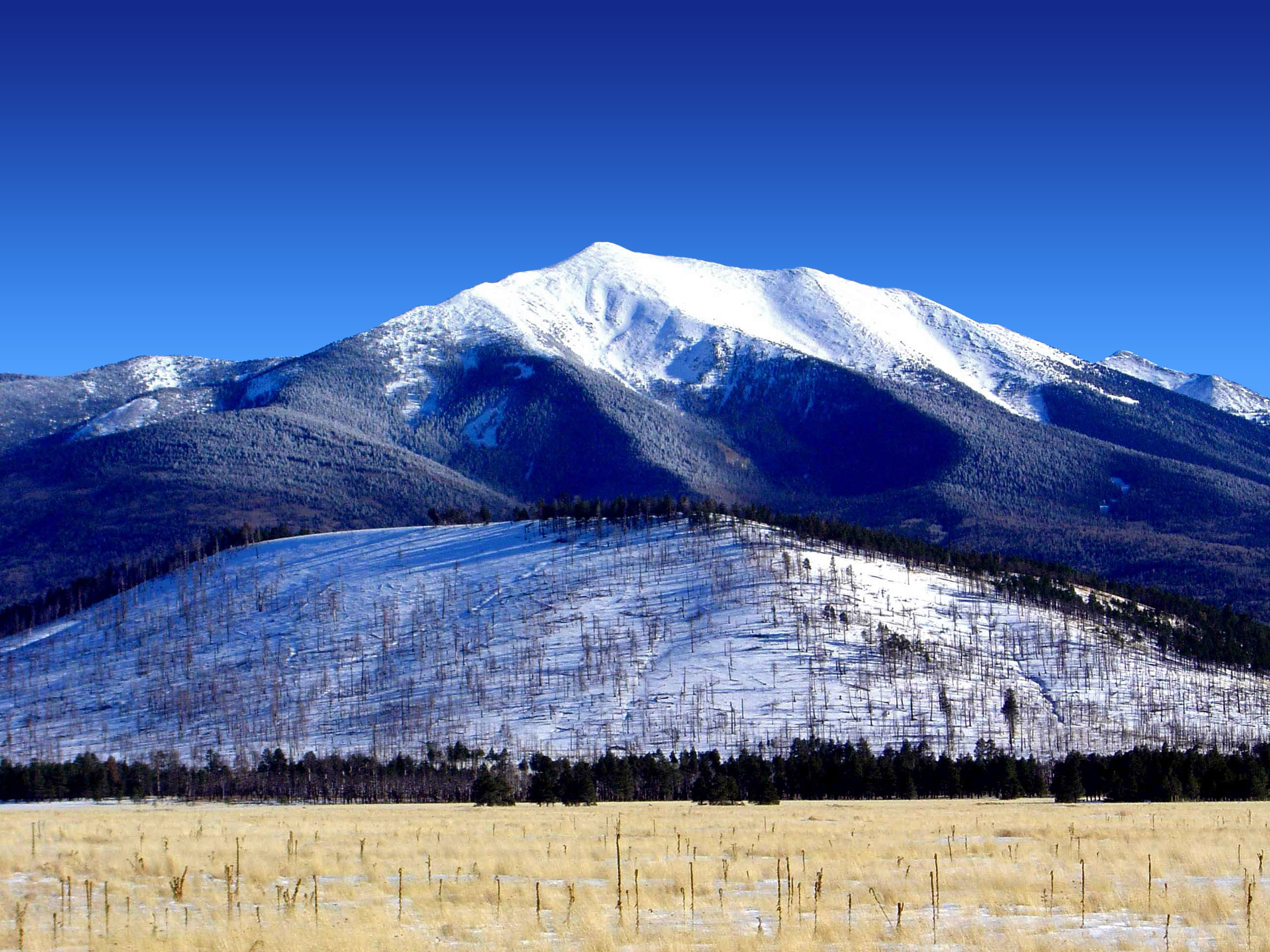
Humphreys Peak

- Agassiz Peak
- Agathla Peak
- Ajo Peak
- Alsap Butte
- Angels Gate
- Baboquivari Peak
- Mount Baldy
- Bear Mountain
- Mount Bigelow
- Black Mesa (western Arizona)
- Bob Thompson Peak
- Brady Peak
- Brahma Temple
- Camelback Mountain
- Capitol Butte
- Castor Temple
- Chiricahua Peak
- Chuar Butte
- Comanche Point
- Confucius Temple
- Coyote Buttes
- Daisy Mountain
- Diamond Peak
- Diana Temple
- Doyle Peak
- Escudilla Mountain
- Evans Butte
- Fan Island
- Four Peaks
- Fremont Peak
- Freya Castle
- Geikie Peak
- Granite Mountain
- Gu Achi Peak
- Holy Grail Temple
- Hualapai Peak
- **Humphreys Peak**, highest summit of the State of Arizona
- Jupiter Temple
- Kaibab Plateau High Point
- Kendrick Peak
- King Arthur Castle
- Kitt Peak
- Lost Wilson Mountain
- Lyell Butte
- Mica Mountain
- Miller Peak
- Mingus Mountain
- Mitchell Mesa
- Mount Ajo
- Mount Elden
- Mount Graham
- Mount Hayden
- Mount Hopkins
- Mount Huethawali
- Mount Lemmon
- Mount Sinyella
- Mount Tipton
- Mount Union
- Mount Wrightson
- Montezuma Peak
- Navajo Mountain
- Picketpost Mountain
- Piestewa Peak
- Pollux Temple
- Pusch Ridge
- Ragged Top
- Rain God Mesa
- Red Butte
- Rincon Peak
- Roof Butte
- San Francisco Peaks, four highest summits of Arizona
- Sentinel Peak (A Mountain)
- Shiva Temple
- SP Crater
- Spearhead Mesa
- Steamboat Mountain
- Sunnyslope Mountain
- Sunset Crater
- Superstition Mountain
- Tempe Butte
- Thimble Peak
- Thompson Peak
- Thor Temple
- Thunderbird Mesa
- Vishnu Temple
- Wilson Mountain
- Zoroaster Temple

=== Arkansas ===
- **Mount Magazine**, highest summit of the State of Arkansas
- Glazypeau Mountain
- Petit Jean

=== California ===
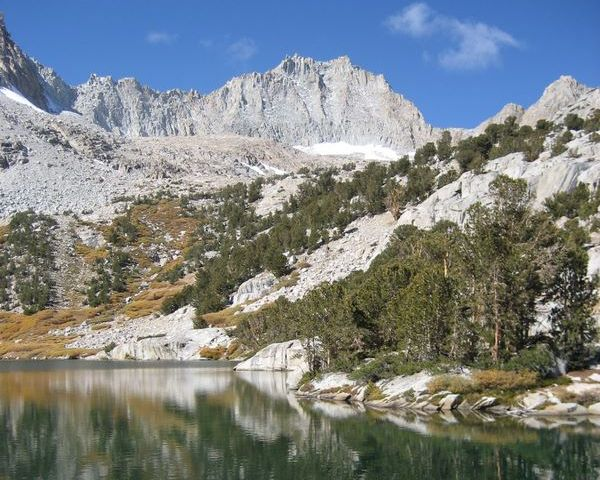
Mount Darwin

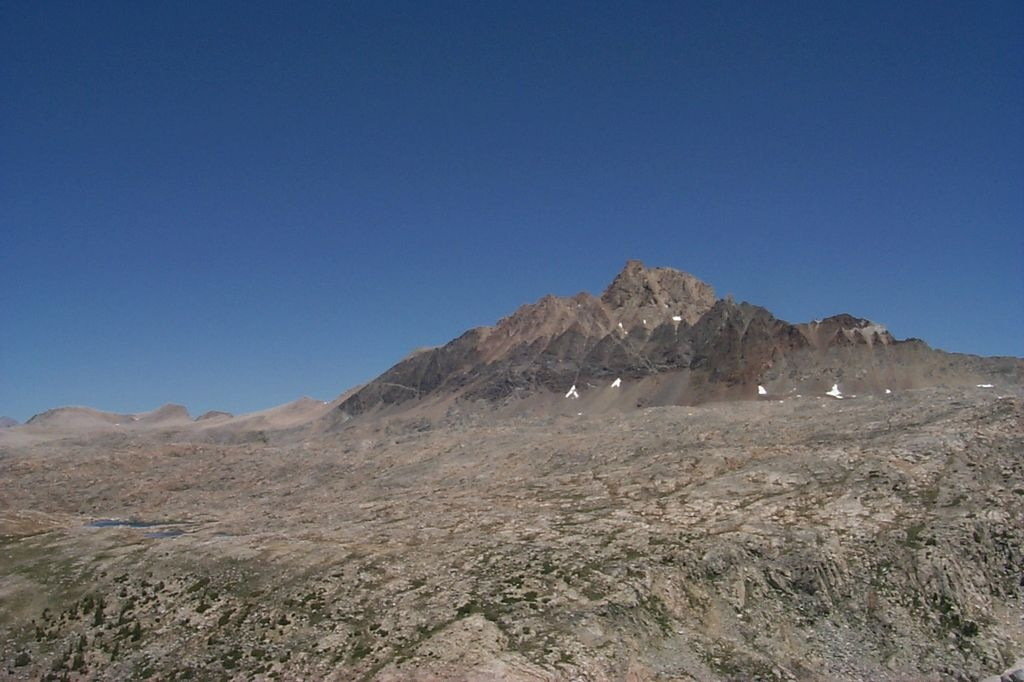
Mount Humphreys

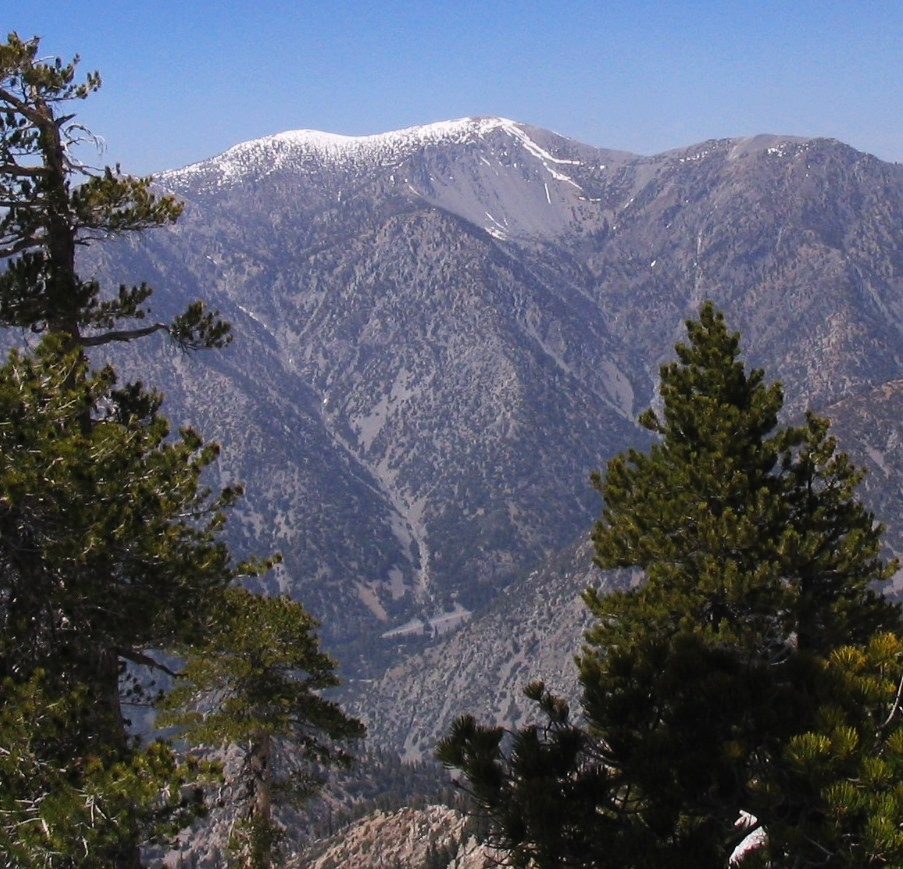
Mount San Antonio

Mount Shasta

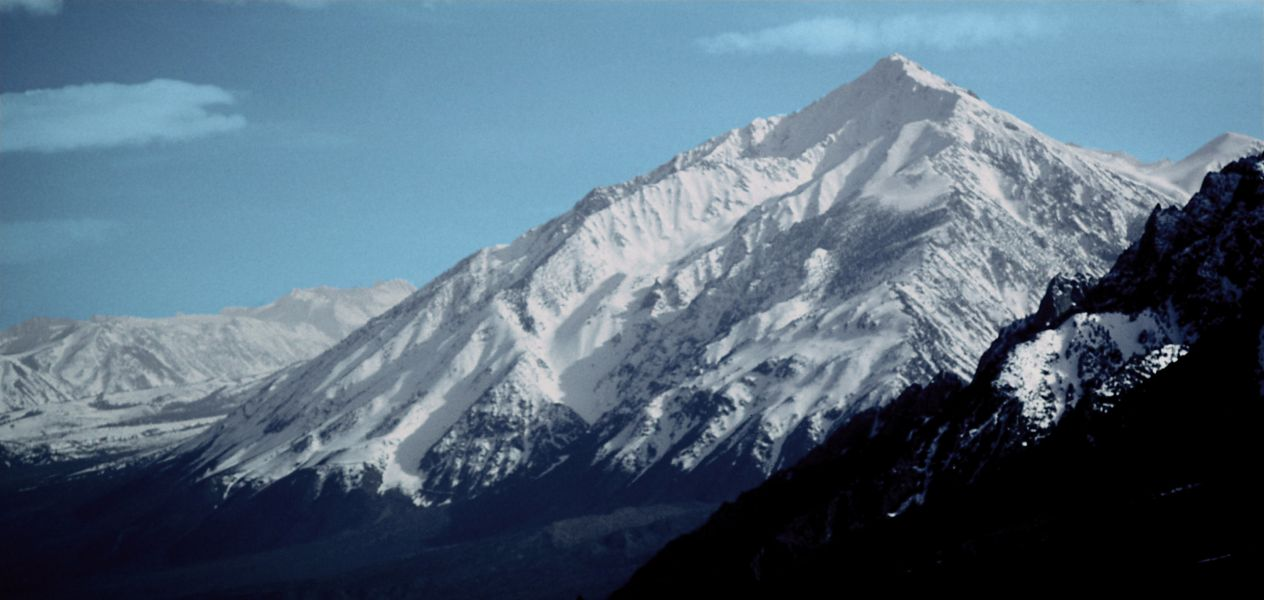
Mount Tom

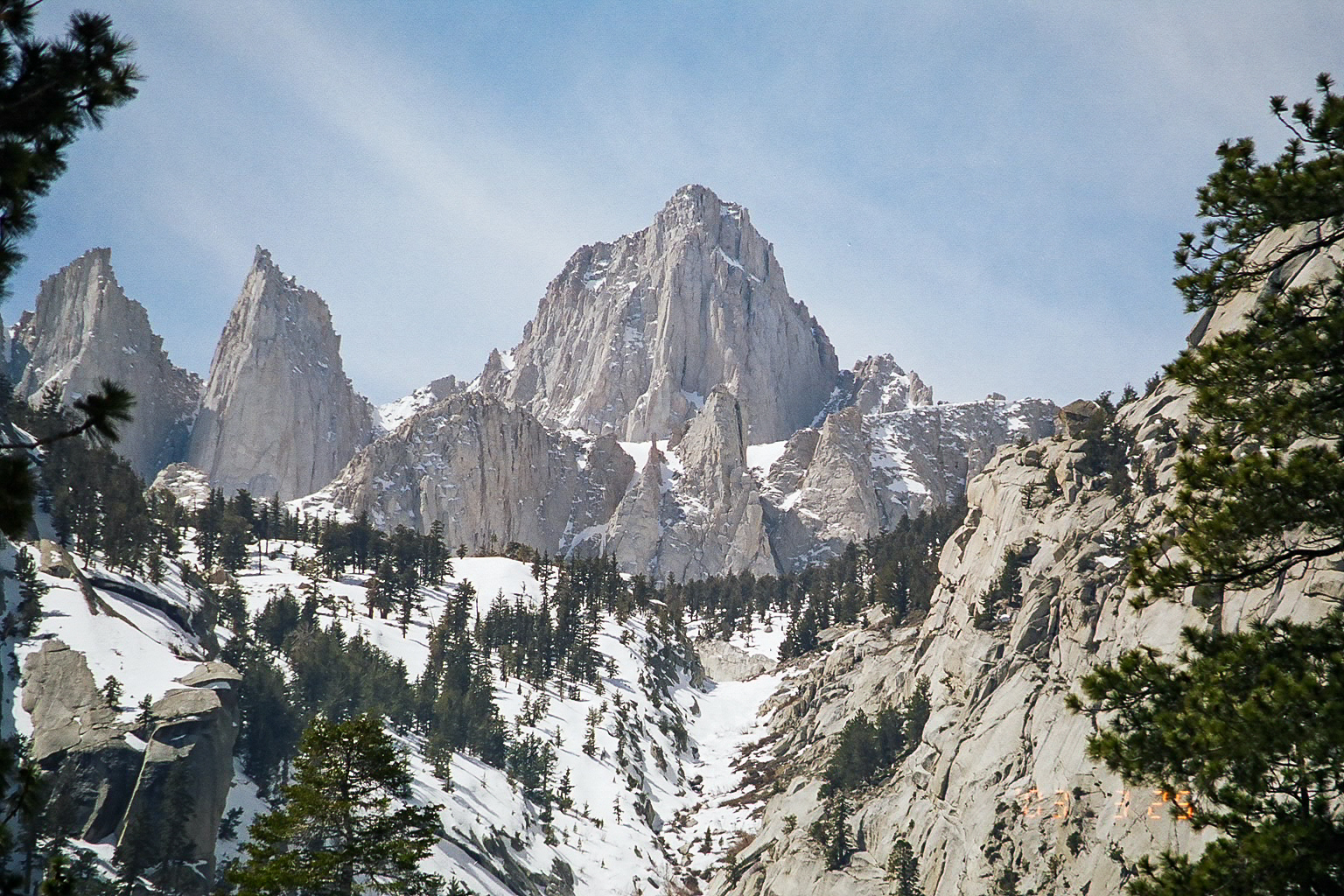
Mount Whitney

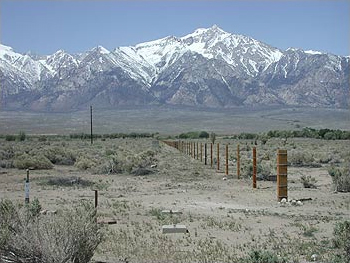
Mount Williamson

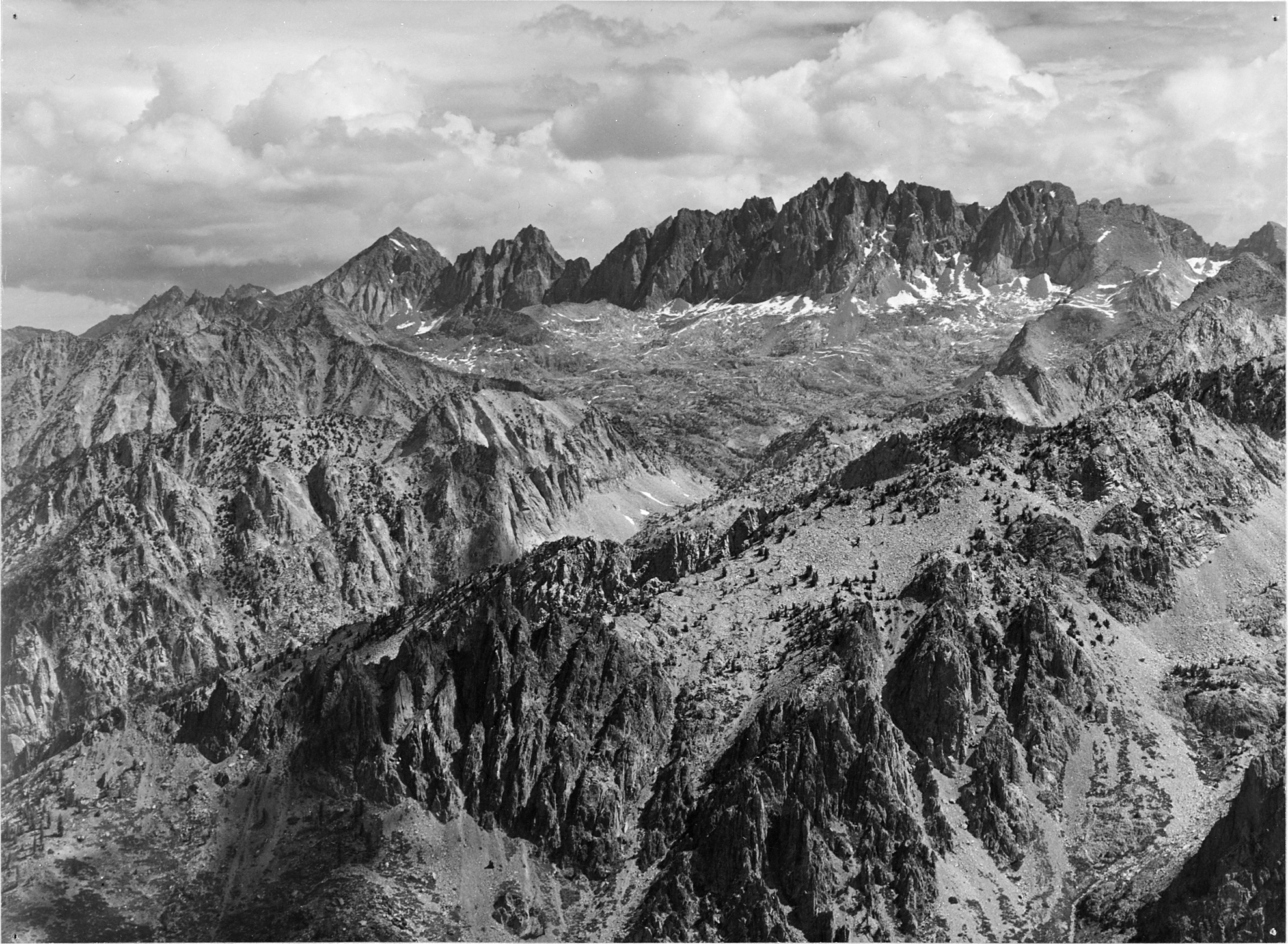
North Palisade

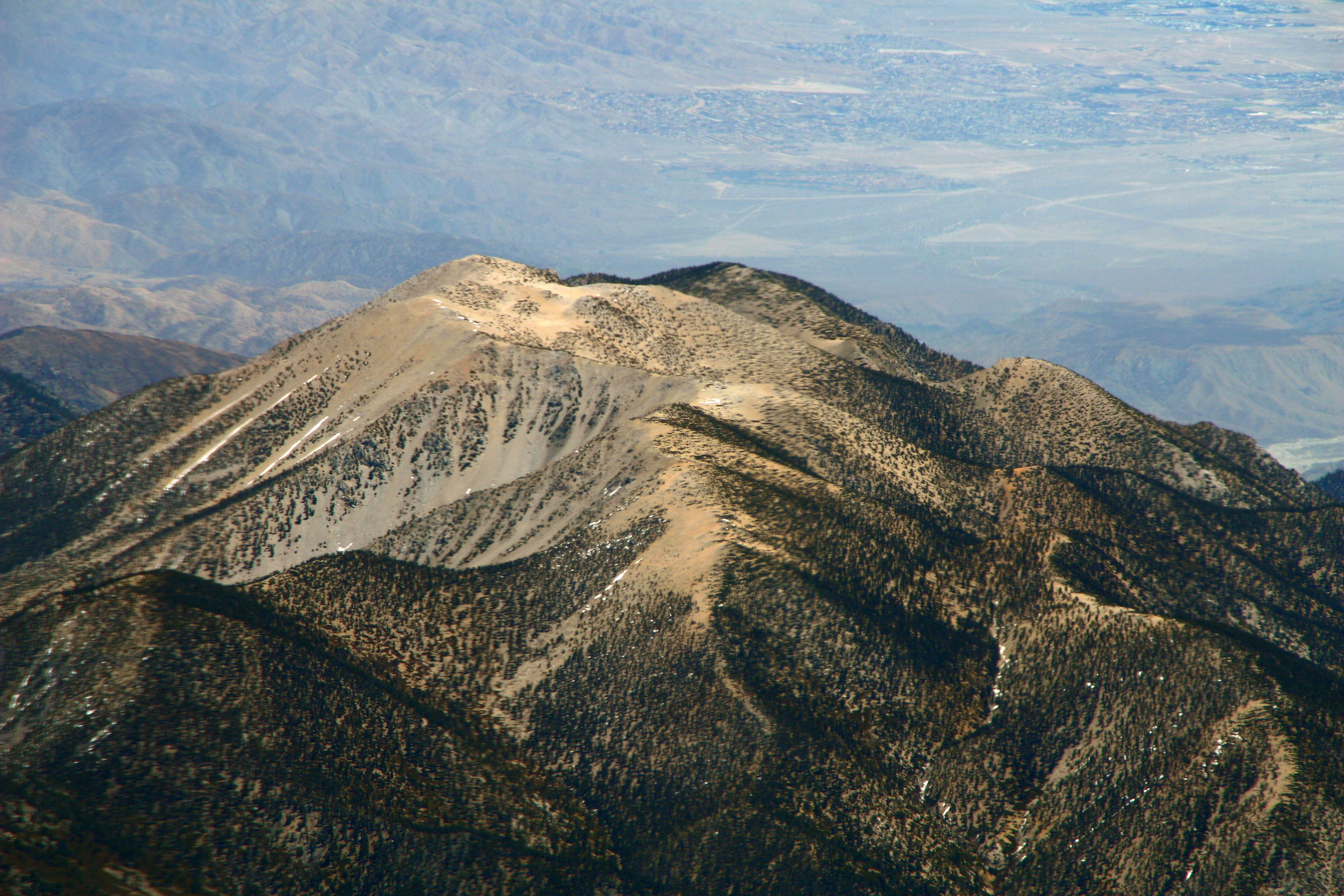
San Gorgonio Mountain

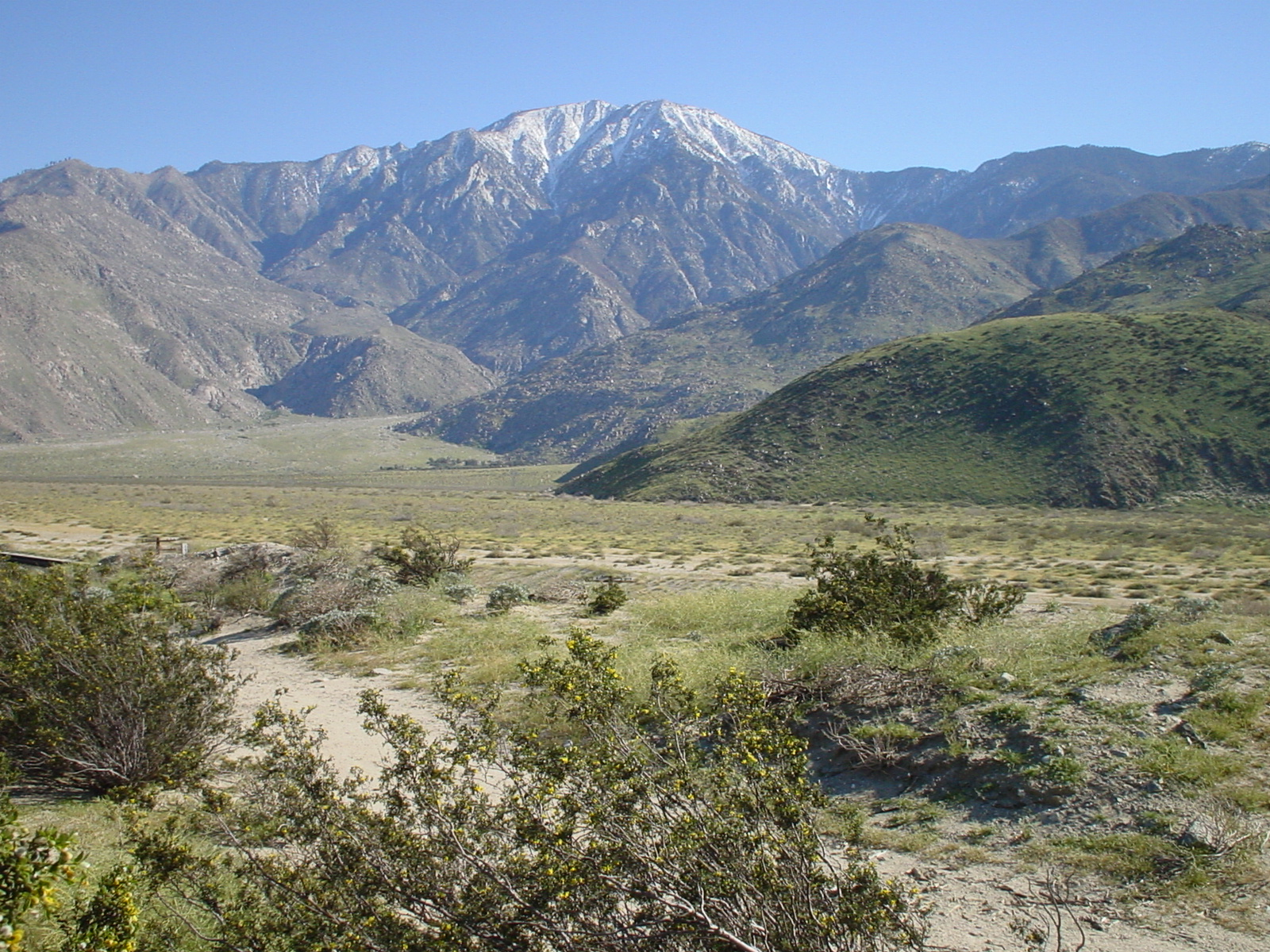
San Jacinto Peak

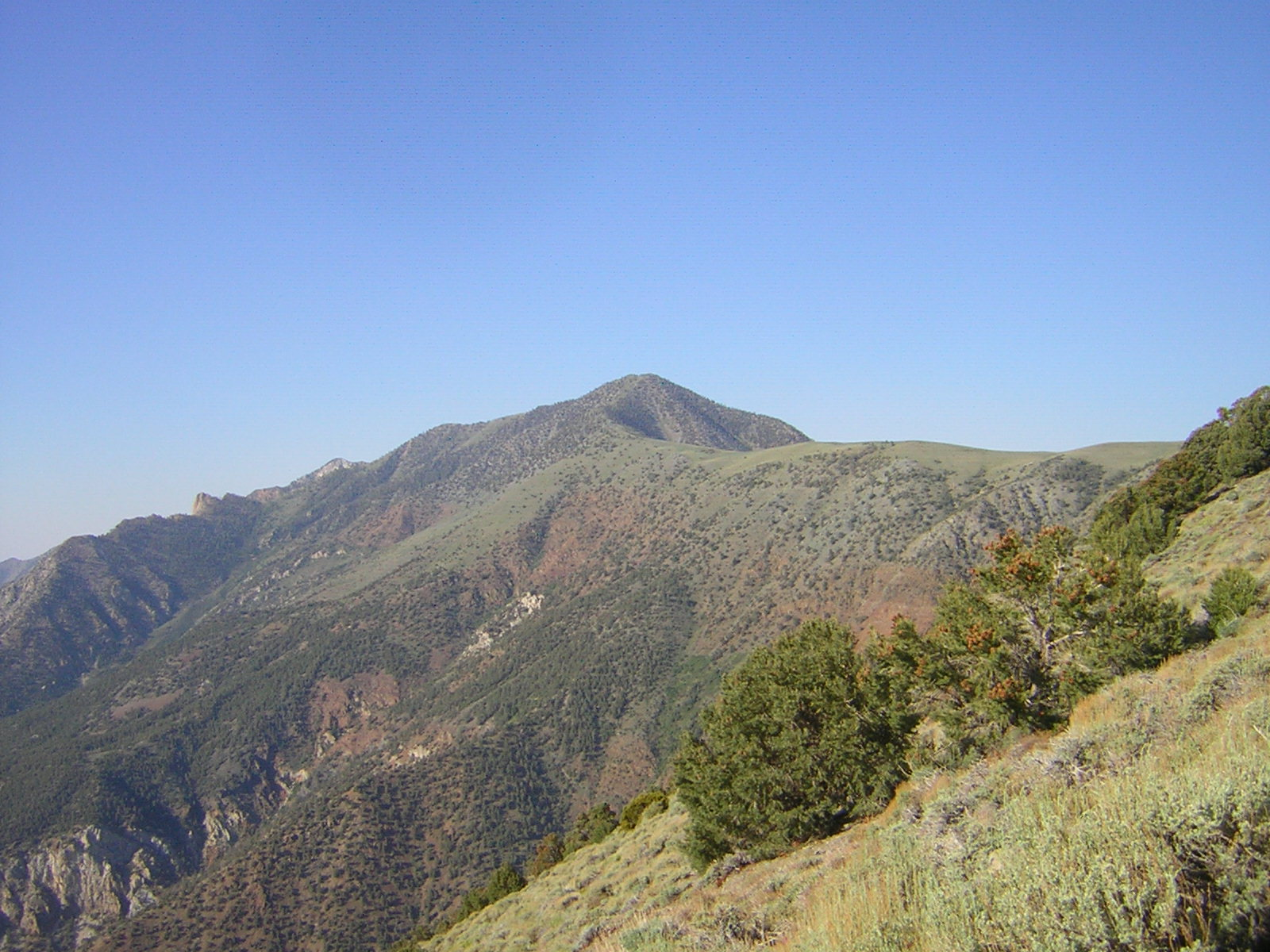
Telescope Peak

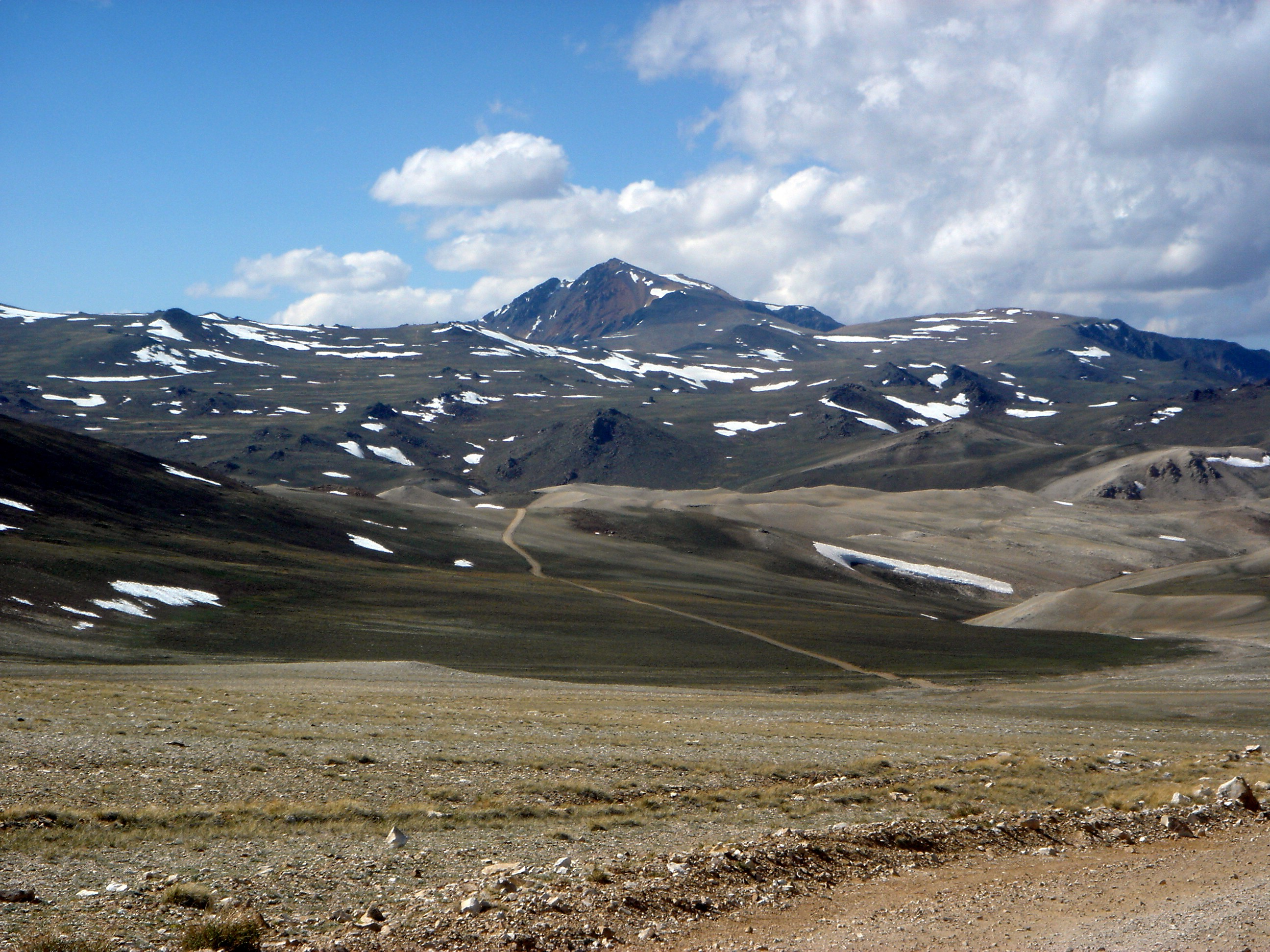
White Mountain Peak

- Acker Peak
- Acrodectes Peak
- Adams Peak
- Alamo Mountain
- Amelia Earhart Peak
- Anderson Peak
- Anderson Peak (Placer County)
- Angel Wings
- Aperture Peak
- Arlington Peak
- Ash Creek Butte
- Avawatz Peak
- Babbitt Peak
- Bald Eagle Mountain
- Bear Claw Spire
- Bear Mountain
- Big Maria Mountains High Point
- Big Pine Mountain
- Birch Mountain
- Black Butte (Chocolate Mountains)
- Black Butte (Northern California Coast Range)
- Black Giant
- Black Kaweah
- Black Mountain
- Black Mountain (Mono County)
- Black Mountain
- Blacktop Peak
- Boulder Peak
- Breckenridge Mountain
- Brown Peak
- Bully Choop Mountain
- Burney Mountain
- Burnt Peak
- Butt Mountain
- Cady Peak
- Cahto Peak
- Calabasas Peak
- Caltech Peak
- Camiaca Peak
- Cardinal Mountain
- Carson Peak
- Castle Peak
- Castle Rocks
- Cathedral Peak
- Center Peak
- Chanchelulla Peak
- Chews Ridge
- Cinder Cone
- Cirque Peak
- Clark Mountain
- Cloudripper
- Clyde Spires
- Cobb Mountain
- Cobblestone Mountain
- Colosseum Mountain
- Columbine Peak
- Condor Peak
- Cone Peak
- Copernicus Peak
- Coso Peak
- Cottonwood Peak
- Cow Mountain
- Coyote Mountain
- Crater Mountain
- Crater Peak
- Crown Point
- Crystal Crag
- Cuyamaca Peak
- Deadwood Peak
- Devils Crags
- Devils Peak, summit of Santa Cruz Island and highest summit of the Channel Islands of California
- Dicks Butte
- Dicks Peak
- Disappointment Peak
- Dixie Mountain
- Dome Mountain (Los Angeles County)
- Donner Peak
- Double Mountain
- Double Peak (San Diego County, California)
- Dragon Peak
- Dry Mountain
- Eagle Crags
- Eagle Mountain
- Eagle Peak
- East Vidette
- Edgar Peak
- El Capitan
- Elephants Back
- Elsinore Peak
- Emerald Peak
- Eocene Peak
- Epidote Peak
- Estelle Mountain
- Falcor Peak
- Feather Peak
- Fin Dome
- Finger Peaks
- Fletcher Peak
- Forsyth Peak
- Four Gables
- Fox Mountain
- Frazier Mountain
- Fredonyer Peak
- Freel Peak
- Fremont Peak
- Fresno Dome
- Funeral Peak
- Gabbro Peak
- Gale Peak
- Gaylor Peak
- Gemini
- George R. Stewart Peak
- Gilcrest Peak
- Giraud Peak
- Glass Mountain
- Goat Mountain
- Goodale Mountain
- Goosenest
- Grand Sentinel
- Granite Dome
- Granite Mountain (Riverside County, California)
- Granite Mountain (San Bernardino County, California)
- Granite Peak (Trinity County, California)
- Graveyard Peak
- Gray Peak
- Grouse Mountain
- Half Dome
- Hamilton Dome
- Hawkins Peak
- Hawksbeak Peak
- Hayfork Bally
- Herlihy Peak
- Highland Peak
- Hilton Peak
- Hines Peak
- Hoosimbim Mountain
- Hot Springs Mountain
- Hot Springs Peak
- Hull Mountain
- Hunewill Peak
- Hurd Peak
- Incredible Hulk
- Independence Peak
- Indian Creek Baldy
- Iron Mountain (Ritter Range)
- Iron Peak
- Jakes Peak
- Jobs Peak
- Jobs Sister
- Joe Devel Peak
- Josephine Peak
- Junipero Serra Peak
- Kearsarge Peak
- Kearsarge Pinnacles
- Keddie Peak
- Kennedy Mountain
- Kennedy Peak
- Kern Peak
- Kern Point
- Kettle Benchmark
- Kettle Peak
- Keynot Peak
- King Peak
- Kingston Peak
- Kuna Peak
- La Cumbre Peak
- Langille Peak
- Lassen Peak, active lava dome
- Last Chance Mountain
- Lawson Peak
- Leavitt Peak
- Lee Vining Peak
- Lembert Dome
- Liberty Cap
- Lion Rock
- Lippincott Mountain
- Loma Prieta
- Lookout Peak
- Lyon Peak
- Madera Peak
- Maggies Peak
- Mammoth Mountain
- Manly Peak
- Marion Peak
- Matterhorn Peak
- Maturango Peak
- Medicine Lake Volcano, shield volcano
- Merriam Peak
- Middle Palisade
- Midway Mountain
- Milk Ranch Peak
- Minarets
- Mission Peak
- Mokelumne Peak
- Monrovia Peak
- Montgomery Peak
- Mount Abbot
- Mount Ansel Adams
- Mount Baden-Powell
- Mount Bago
- Mount Baldwin
- Mount Baxter
- Mount Bolton Brown
- Mount Bradley (Inyo County, California)
- Mount Bradley (Siskiyou County, California)
- Mount Carillon
- Mount Carl Heller
- Mount Cedric Wright
- Mount Chamberlin (California)
- Mount Conness
- Mount Corcoran
- Mount Crocker
- Mount Dade
- Mount Dana
- Mount Darwin
- Mount Davis
- Mount Diablo
- Mount Disappointment
- Mount Dubois
- Mount Eddy, highest summit of the Klamath Mountains
- Mount Eisen
- Mount Fiske
- Mount Gabb
- Mount Gayley
- Mount Genevra
- Mount George Davis
- Mount Gibbs
- Mount Gilbert
- Mount Goode
- Mount Haeckel
- Mount Hale
- Mount Hamilton
- Mount Harrington
- Mount Henry
- Mount Hilgard
- Mount Hitchcock
- Mount Hoffmann
- Mount Hood
- Mount Hooper
- Mount Hopkins
- Mount Humphreys
- Mount Huntington
- Mount Ickes
- Mount Ingalls
- Mount Izaak Walton
- Mount Jepson
- Mount Johnson
- Mount Jordan
- Mount Judah
- Mount Julius Caesar
- Mount Kaweah
- Mount Keith
- Mount Lamarck
- Mount Langley
- Mount Lassic, (Signal Mountain)
- Mount Lawlor
- Mount Lee
- Mount Lewis
- Mount Lincoln
- Mount Lola
- Mount Lyell
- Mount McGee
- Mount McDuffie
- Mount Mills
- Mount Morgan (Inyo County, California)
- Mount Morgan (Mono County, California)
- Mount Morrison
- Mount Muir
- Mount Newcomb
- Mount Orizaba, summit of Santa Catalina Island
- Mount Patterson
- Mount Perkins
- Mount Pickering
- Mount Pinchot
- Mount Pinos
- Mount Powell
- Mount Prater
- Mount Randy Morgenson
- Mount Reinstein
- Mount Ritter
- Mount Rixford
- Mount Robinson
- Mount Ruskin
- Mount Russell
- Mount San Antonio, known locally as Mount Baldy
- Mount San Gorgonio
- Mount Scowden
- Mount Senger
- Mount Shakspere
- Mount Shasta - active stratovolcano that is the highest summit of the California Cascade Range
- Mount Shinn
- Mount Sill
- Mount Stanford (North)
- Mount Stanford (South)
- Mount Starr
- Mount Tallac
- Mount Tamalpais
- Mount Thompson
- Mount Tinemaha
- Mount Tom
- Mount Tyndall
- Mount Umunhum
- Mount Veeder
- Mount Versteeg
- Mount Wallace
- Mount Warlow
- Mount Warren
- Mount Watkins
- **Mount Whitney**, highest summit of the Sierra Nevada, the State of California, and the contiguous United States
- Mount Williamson
- Mount Wilson
- Mount Wood
- Mount Wynne
- Mount Young
- Muriel Peak
- Needle Peak
- Negro Butte
- New York Mountains High Point
- Night Cap Peak
- Nopah Range High Point
- North Guard
- North Palisade
- North Yolla Bolly Mountain
- Observation Peak
- Olancha Peak
- Old Woman Mountains
- Ord Mountains
- Owens Peak
- Page Peaks
- Painted Lady
- Palomar Mountain
- Parker Peak
- Peter Peak
- Pickaninny Buttes
- Picket Guard Peak
- Picture Peak
- Picture Puzzle
- Pilot Knob (Fresno County)
- Pine Mountain
- Pinyon Peak
- Piute Peak
- Pointless Peak
- Potato Peak
- Preston Peak
- Pyramid Peak
- Pyramid Peak (Fresno County)
- Quail Mountain
- Rafferty Peak
- Rainbow Ridge
- Raymond Peak
- Recess Peak
- Red and White Mountain
- Red Kaweah
- Red Peak (El Dorado County, California)
- Red Peak (Madera County, California)
- Red Slate Mountain
- Resting Spring Range High Point
- Reyes Peak
- Reynolds Peak
- Robinson Peak
- Rogers Peak
- Round Top
- Royce Peak
- Russian Peak
- Salmon Mountain
- San Benito Mountain
- San Gorgonio Mountain, highest summit of the Transverse Ranges
- San Jacinto Peak
- San Mateo Peak
- San Rafael Mountains
- Sandstone Peak
- Sanhedrin Mountain
- Santa Ynez Peak
- Santiago Peak
- Sawmill Point
- Scylla
- Seven Gables
- Sheep Hole Mountains High Point
- Sierra Buttes
- Silver Peak (Alpine County)
- Silver Peak (El Dorado County)
- Silver Peak (Fresno County)
- Sirretta Peak
- Slate Mountain
- Smith Peak
- Snow Mountain
- Sonora Peak
- South Butte
- South Guard
- South Yolla Bolly Mountain, highest summit of the Northern California Coast Range
- Spectre Peak
- Split Mountain
- Stanton Peak
- State Peak
- Stevens Peak
- Straw Peak
- Striped Mountain
- Telescope Peak
- The Citadel
- The Hermit
- The Nipple
- The Sphinx
- The Three Chimneys
- The Thumb
- Thirst Benchmark, summit of San Clemente Island
- Thompson Peak
- Thor Peak
- Thunderbolt Peak
- Tiefort Mountains High Point
- Tinker Knob
- Tin Mountain
- Toro Peak
- Tower Peak
- Trojan Peak
- Tunnabora Peak
- Turtle Mountains High Point
- Twin Peaks (Placer County)
- Twin Peaks
- Vandever Mountain
- Vennacher Needle
- Victoria Peak
- Volcanic Ridge
- Warren Peak
- Washeshu Peak
- Waucoba Mountain
- Wells Peak
- West Vidette
- Whaleback
- Whale Peak
- Wheel Mountain
- Whipple Mountains High Point
- White Mountain Peak
- White Top Mountain
- Widow Mountain
- Wildrose Peak
- Willow Creek Mountain
- Ycatapom Peak

=== Colorado ===
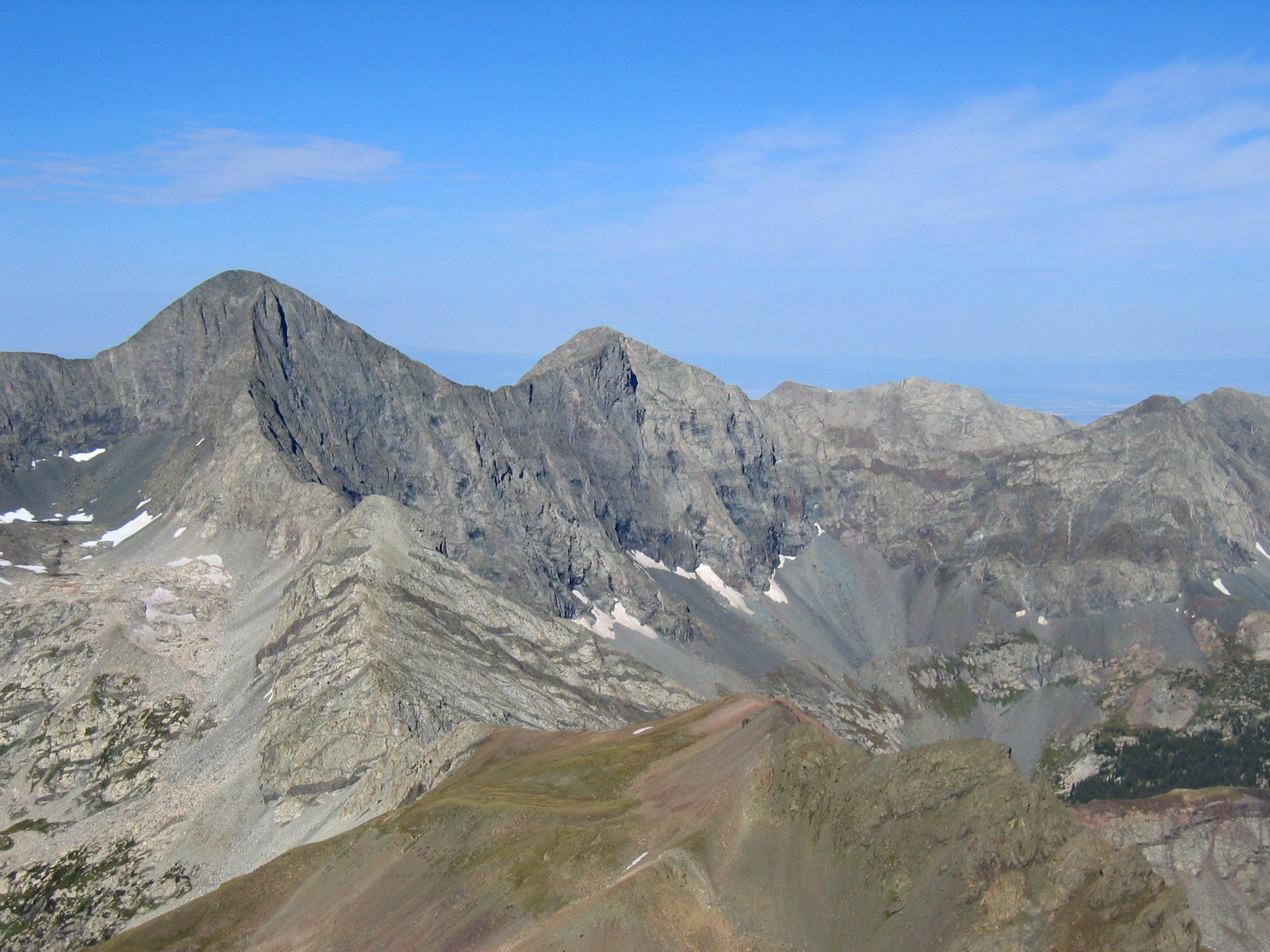
Blanca Peak

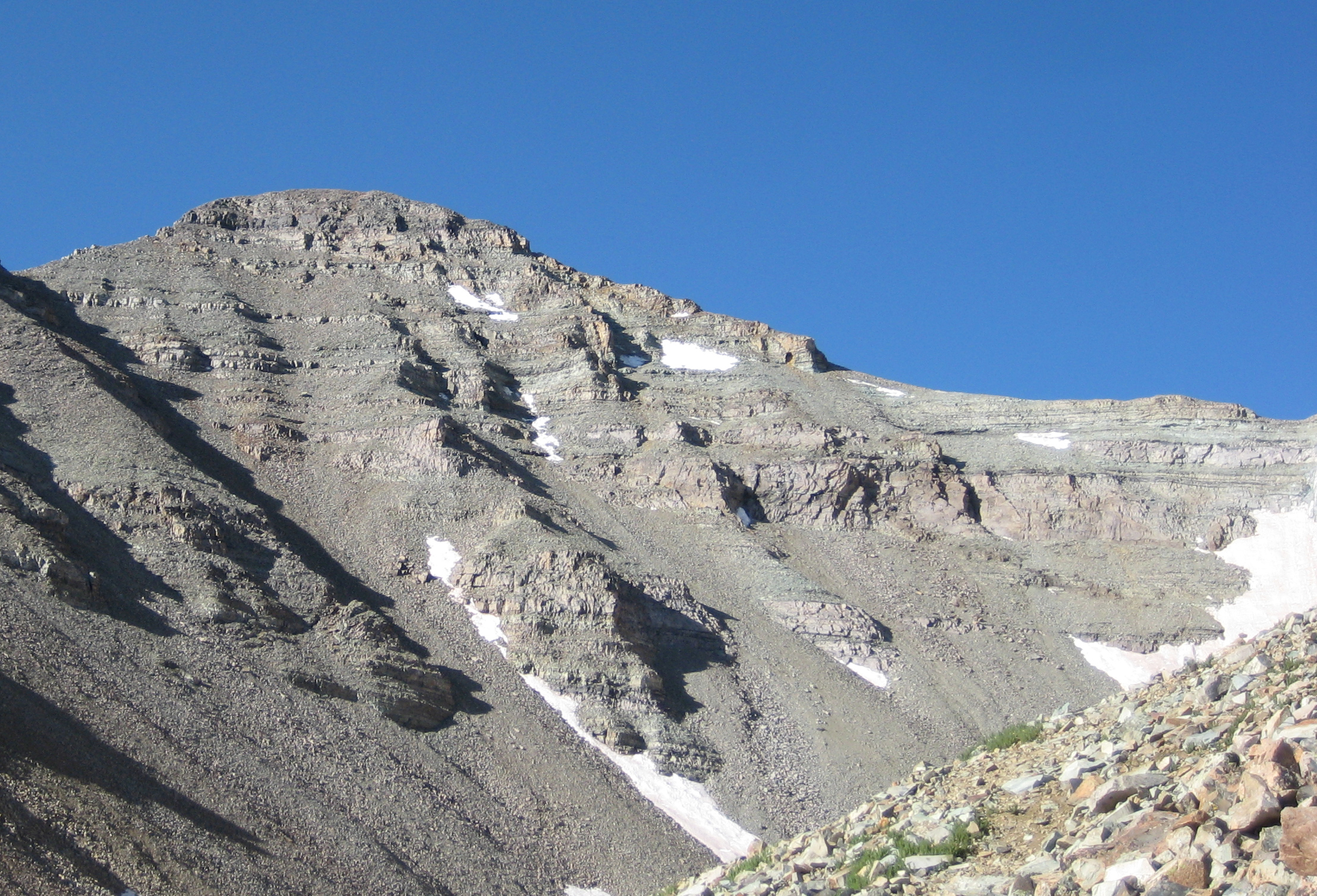
Castle Peak

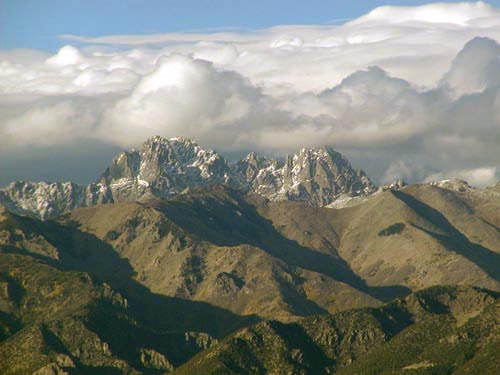
Crestone Peak

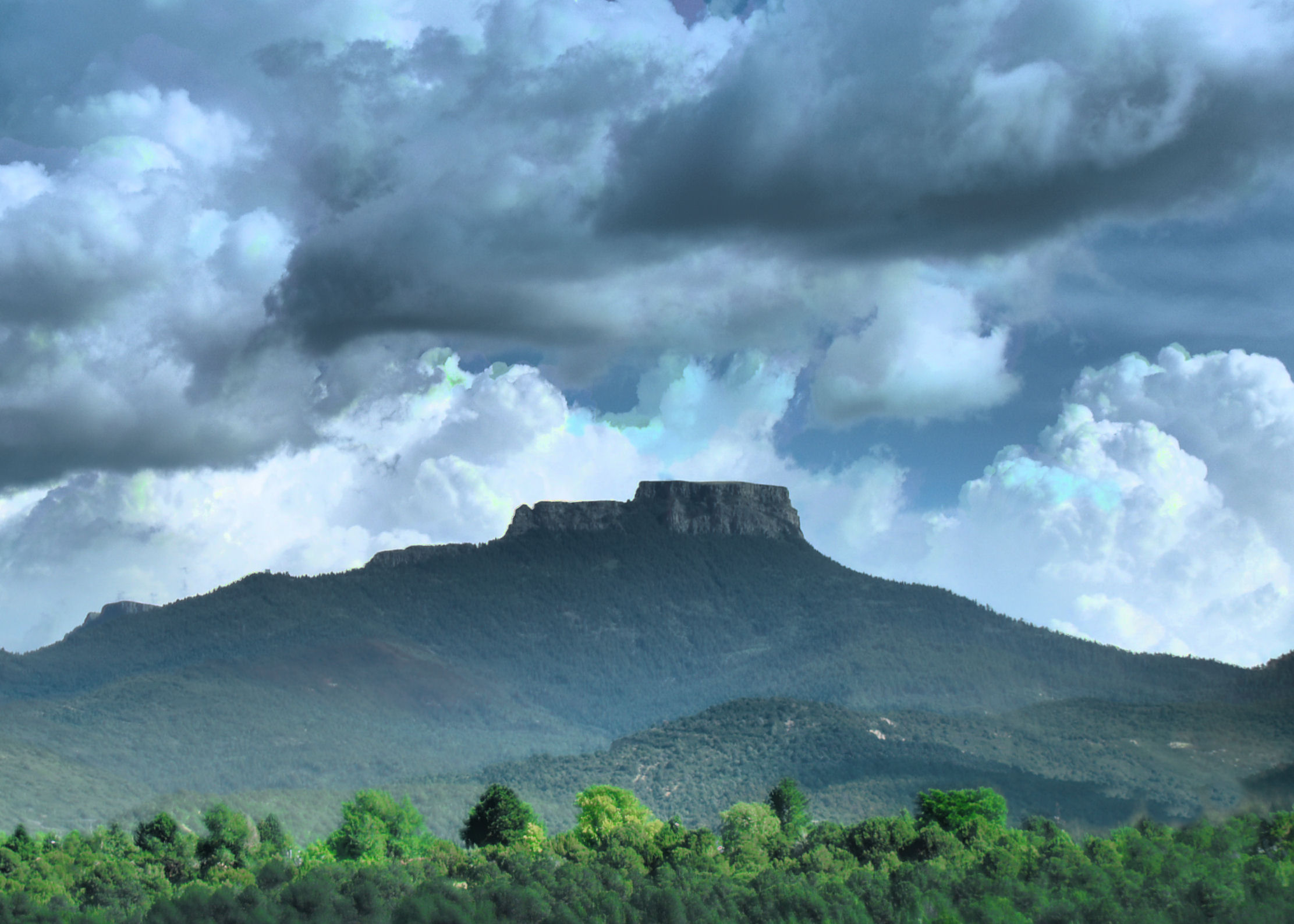
Fishers Peak

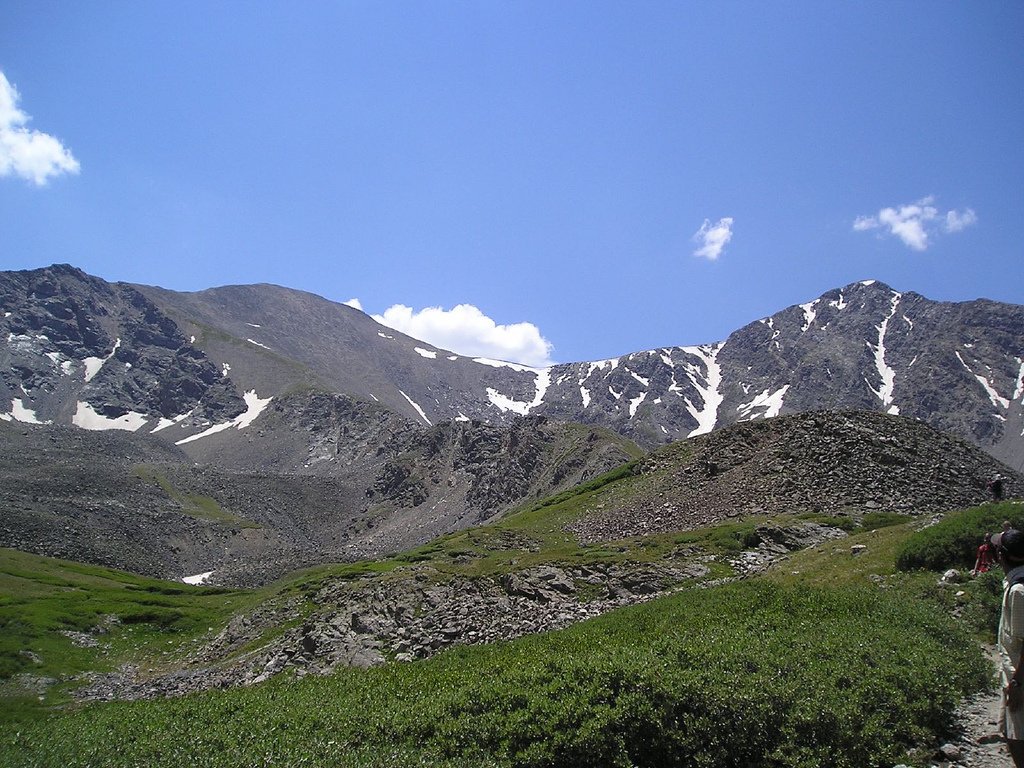
Grays Peak

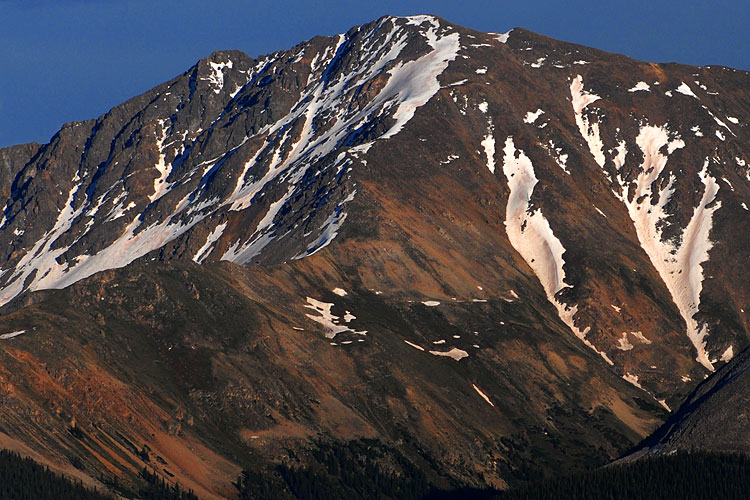
La Plata Peak

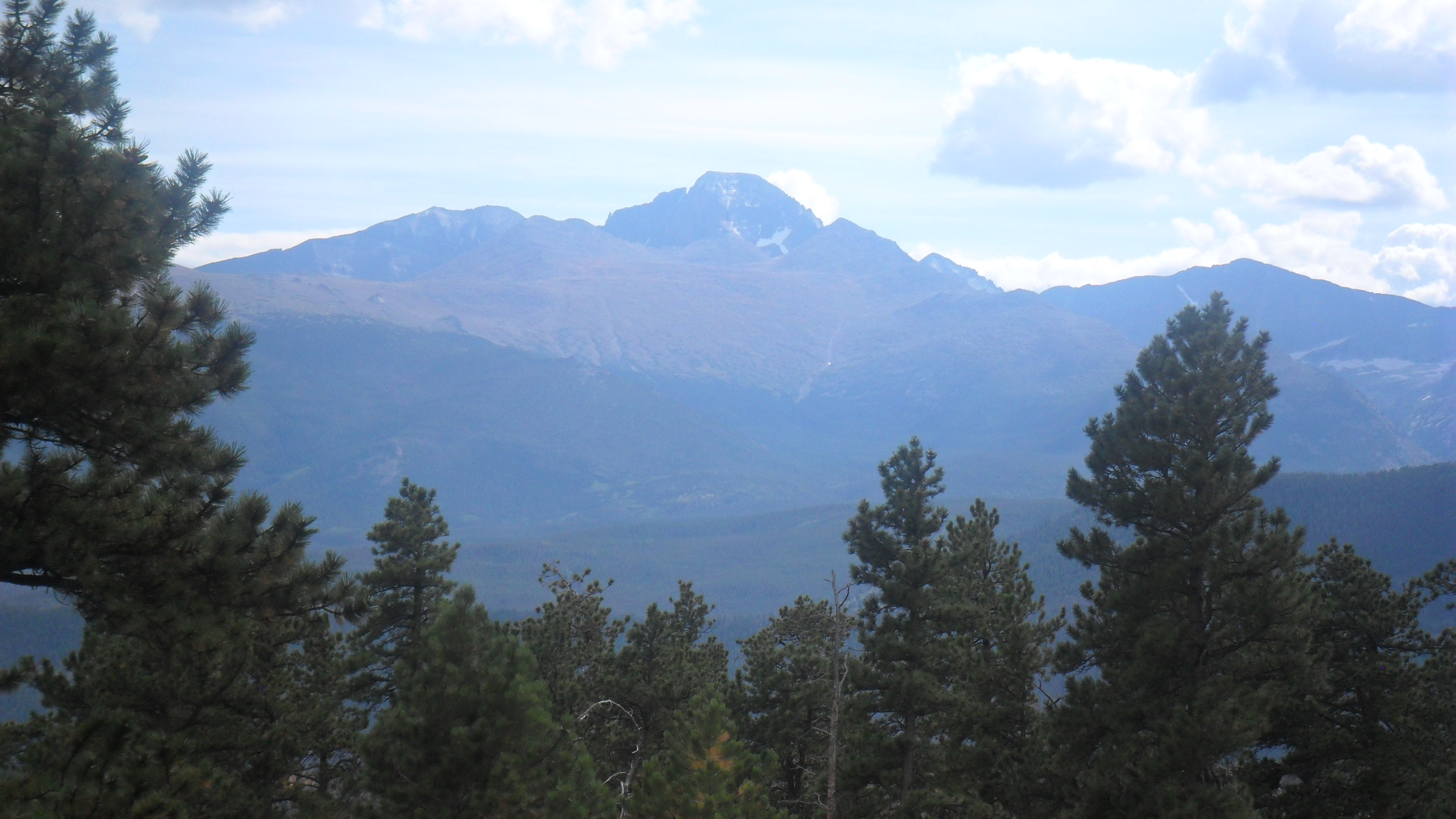
Longs Peak

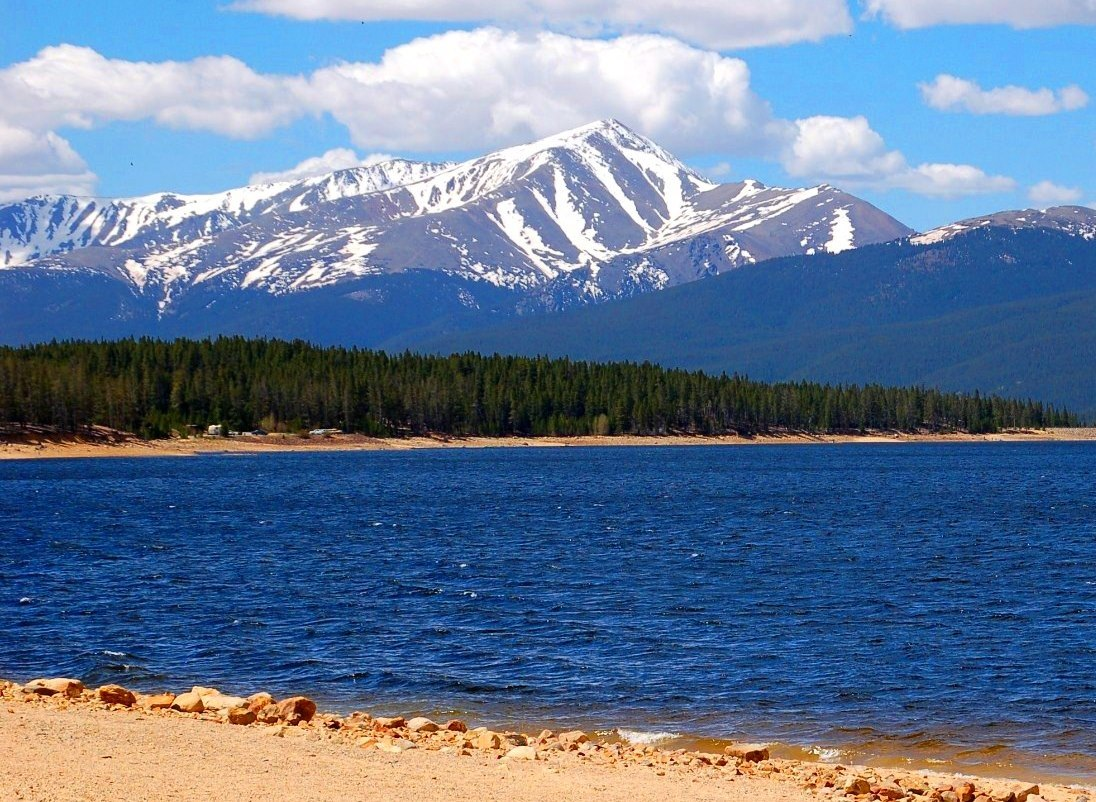
Mount Elbert

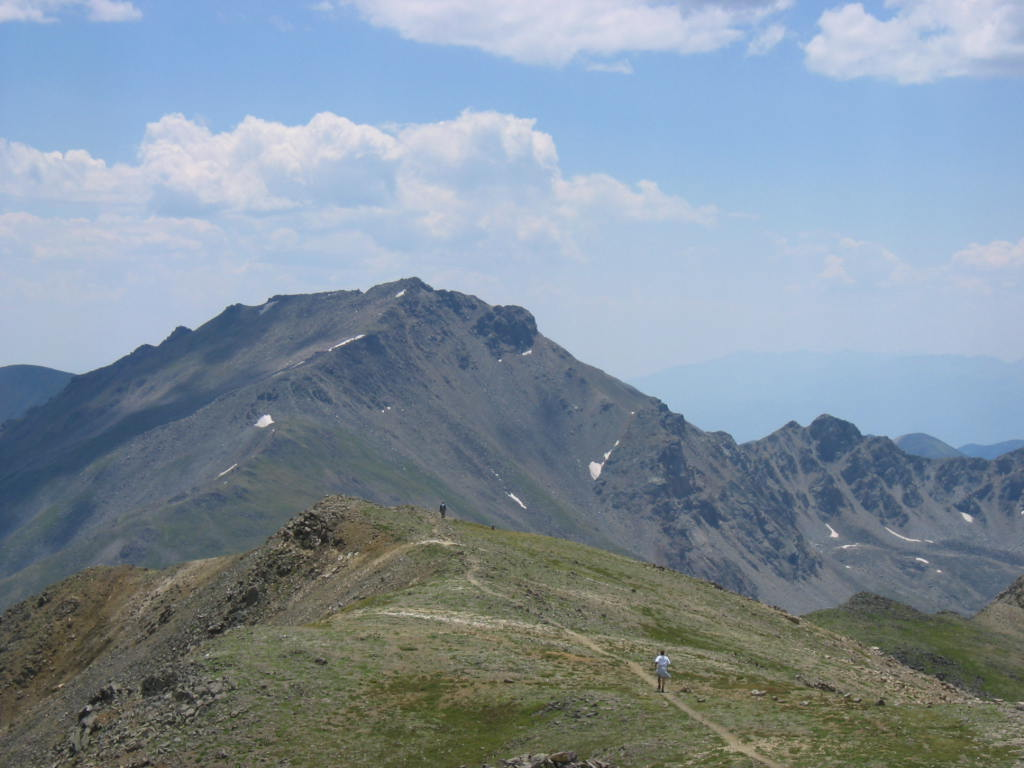
Mount Harvard

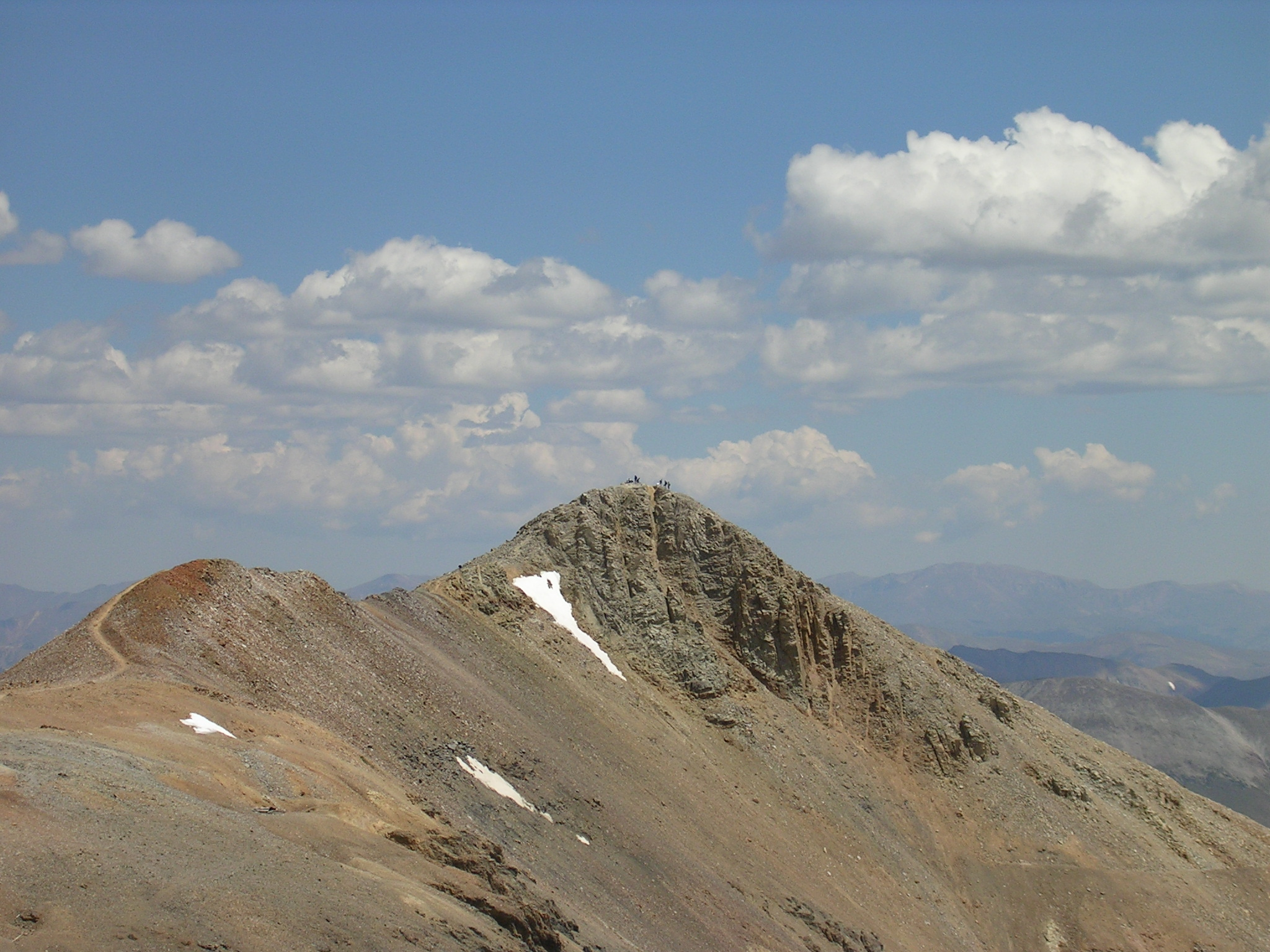
Mount Lincoln

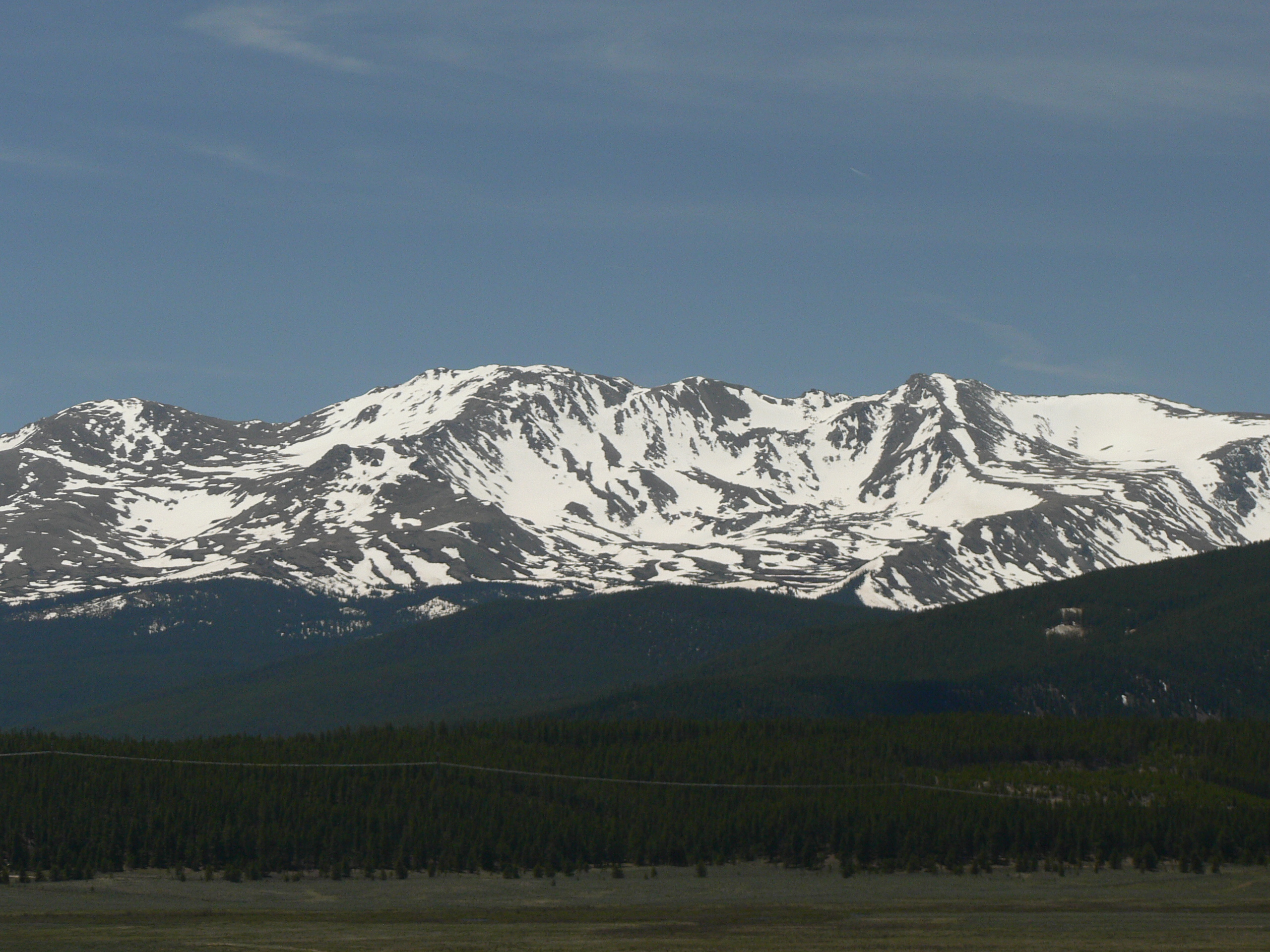
Mount Massive

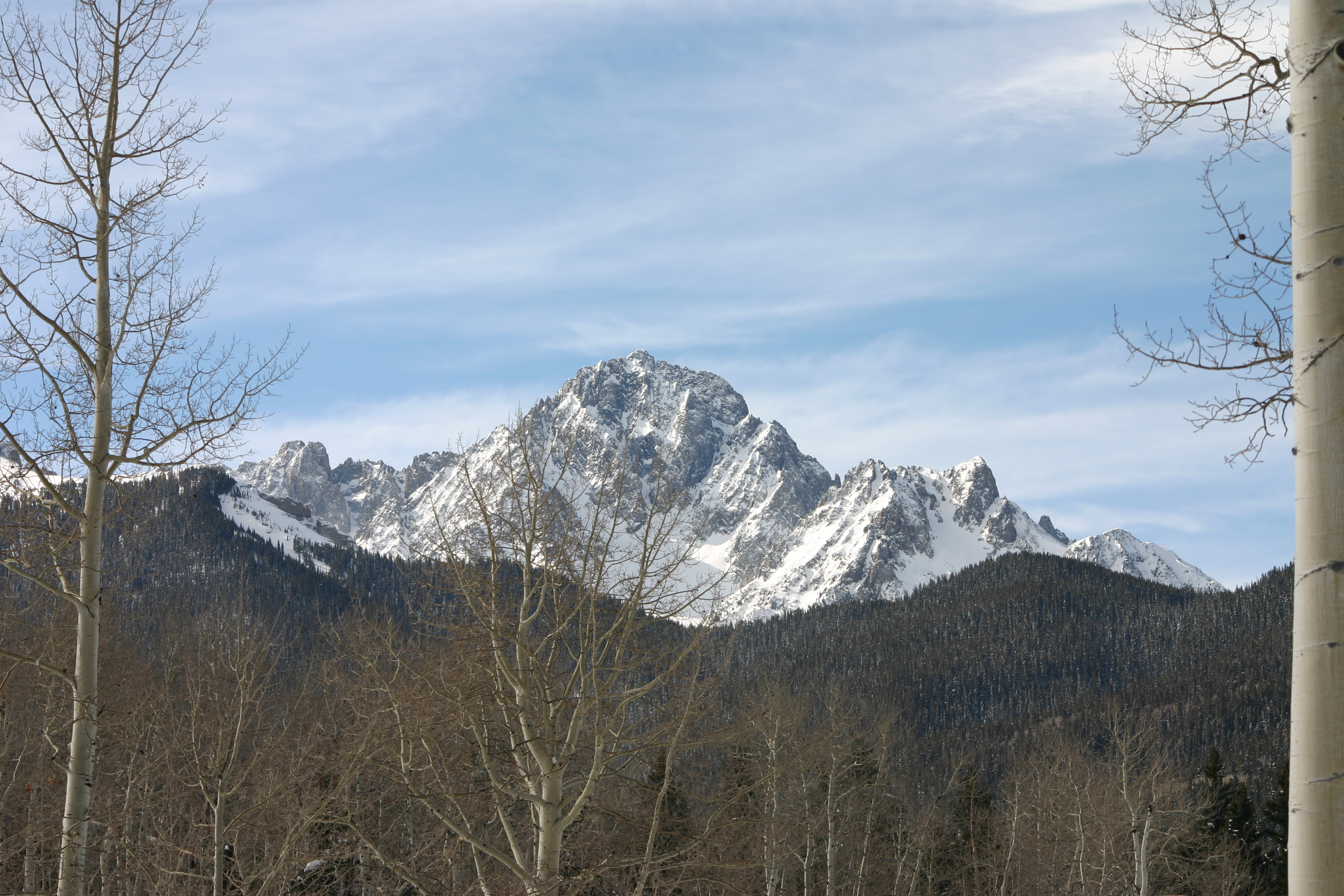
Mount Sneffels

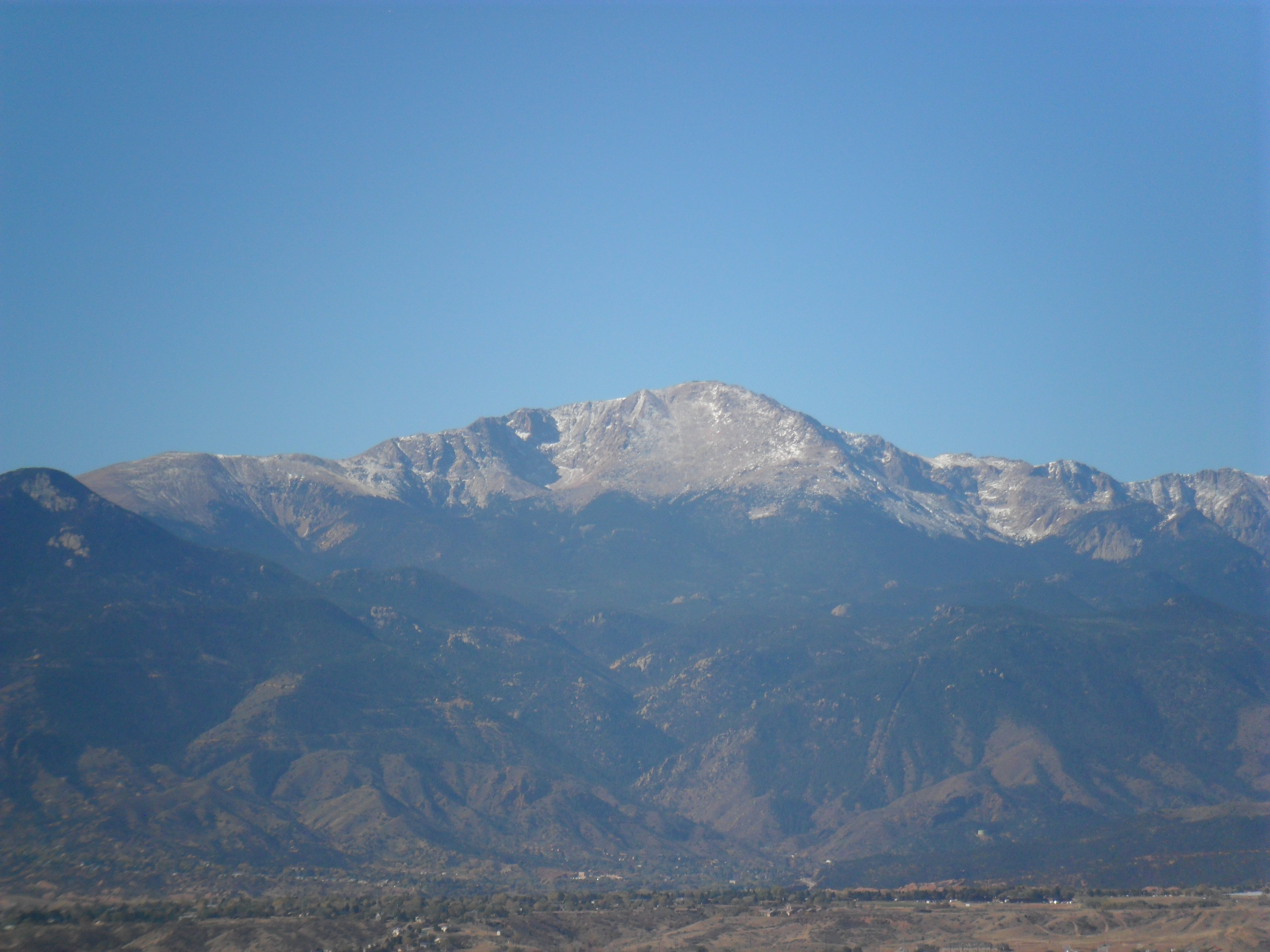
Pikes Peak

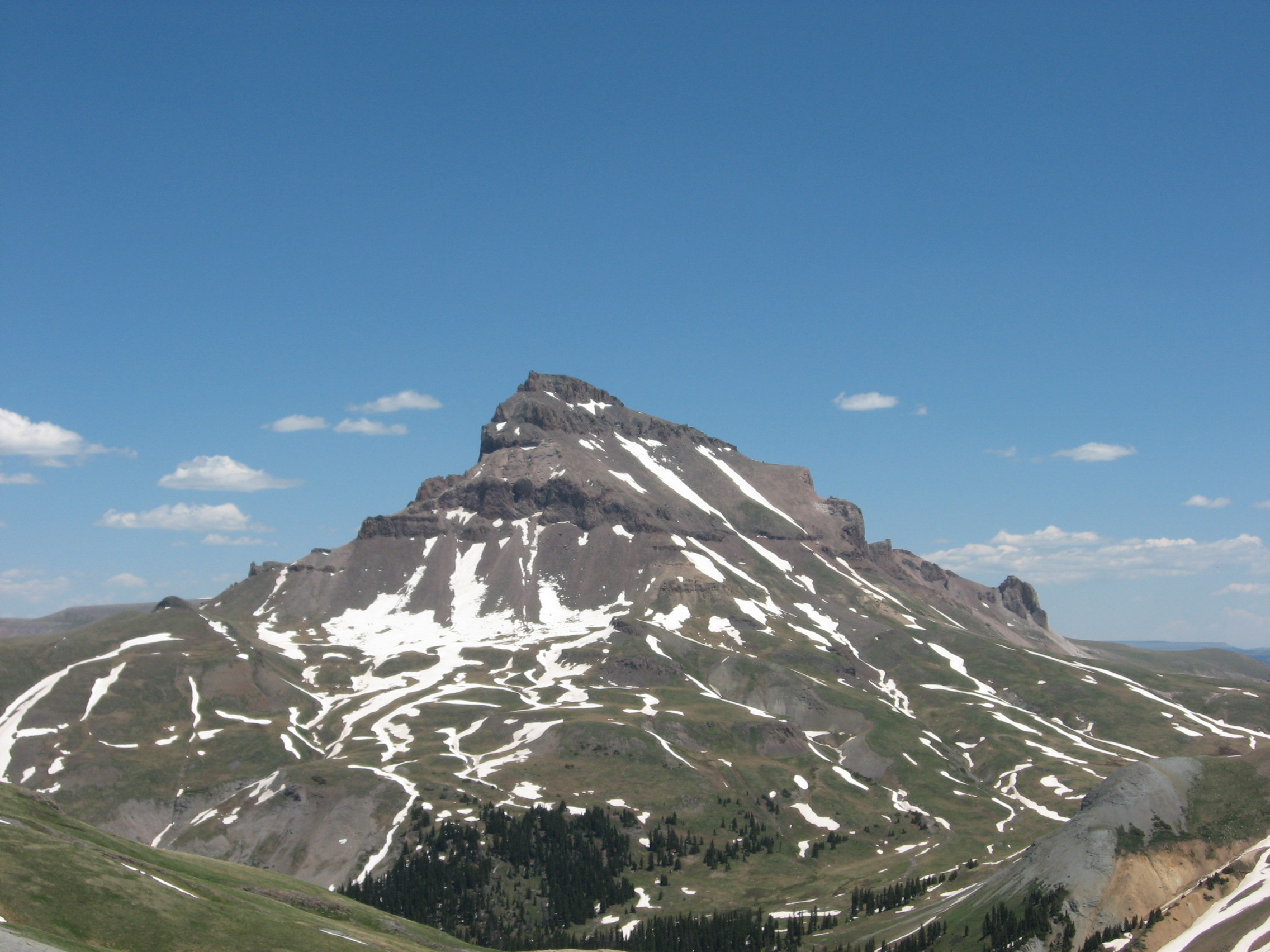
Uncompahgre Peak

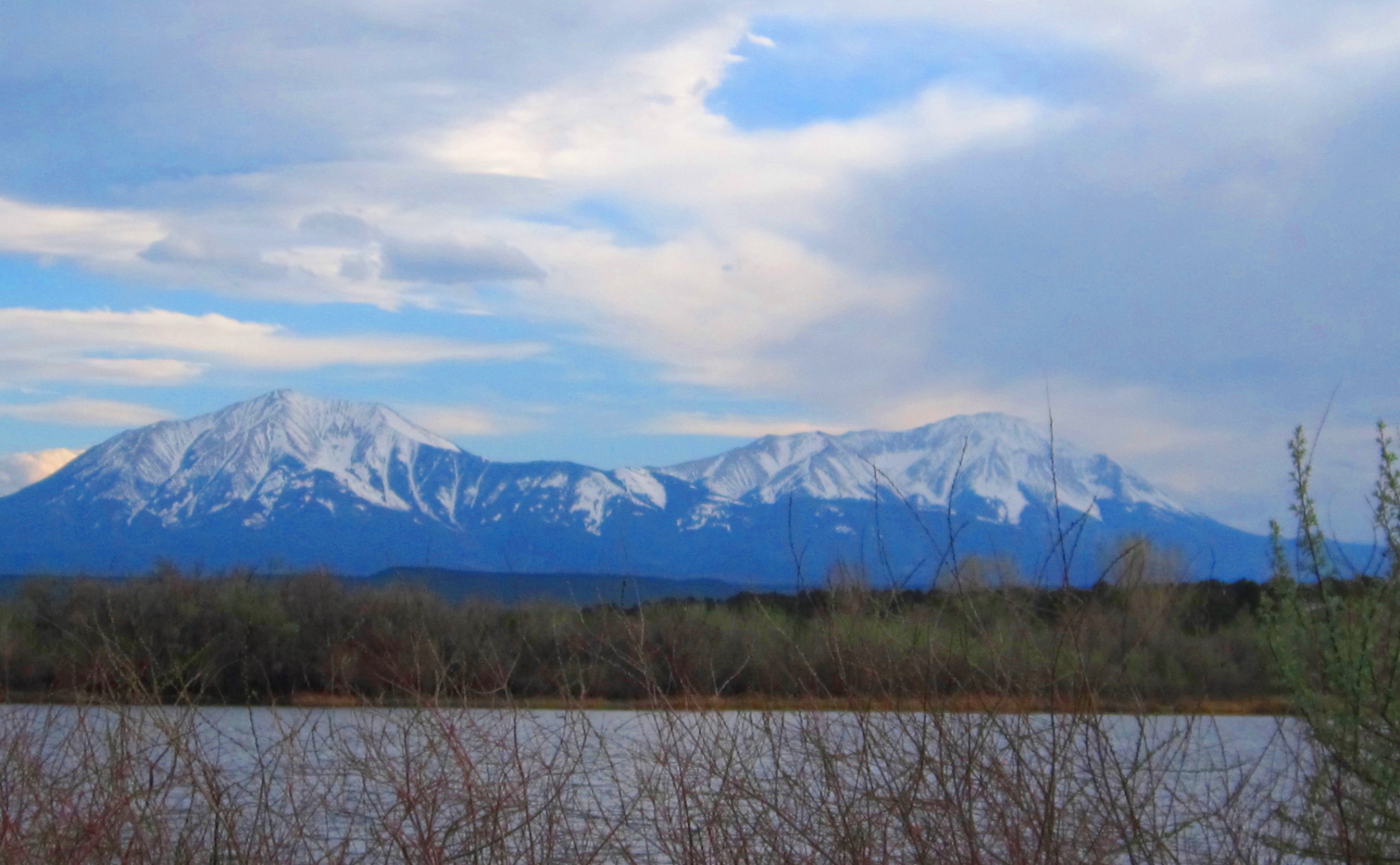
Spanish Peaks

- Abrams Mountain 12,801'
- Afley Peak 12,646'
- Ajax Peak 12,785'
- American Peak 13,806'
- Amherst Mountain 13,165'
- Anthracite Range High Point 12,394'
- Antora Peak 13,275'
- Apache Peak 13,441'
- Argentine Peak 13,743'
- Arrow Peak 13,809'
- Aspen Mountain 10,705'
- Atlantic Peak
- Aztec Mountain 13,310'
- Babcock Peak 13,161'
- Badger Mountain 11,295'
- Baker Mountain 12,410'
- Bald Mountain 13,690'
- Bard Peak 13,647'
- Bear Mountain 12,987'
- Bear Peak 8,459'
- Bennett Peak 13,209'
- Berrian Mountain 9,151'
- Bill Williams Peak 13,389' – highest summit of the Williams Mountains
- Bison Mountain 12,432' – highest summit of the Tarryall Mountains
- Black Mountain (Elkhead Mountains) 10,865'
- Black Mountain (South Park Hills) 11,649'
- Blair Mountain 11,465' – highest summit of the White River Plateau
- Blanca Peak 14,351' – highest summit of the Sangre de Cristo Mountains
- Blanco Point 12,033'
- Blodgett Peak 9,444'
- Boreas Mountain 13,082'
- Bowen Mountain 12,524'
- Braddock Peak 11,972'
- Bristol Head 12,712'
- Broken Hand Peak 13,573'
- Brown Mountain 13,347'
- Buffalo Mountain 12,781'
- Buffalo Peak 11,594'
- Bushnell Peak 13,110'
- Calf Creek Plateau 12,661'
- California Peak 13,855'
- Canby Mountain 13,478'
- Cannibal Plateau 12,533'
- Capitol Peak 14,137'
- Carbon Peak 12,088'
- Carbonate Mountain 13,670'
- Carson Peak 13,662'
- Cascade Mountain 12,326'
- Casco Peak 13,915'
- Castle Peak (Elk Mountains) 14,279' – highest summit of the Elk Mountains
- Castle Peak (Sawatch Range) 11,305'
- Castle Rock (San Juan Mountains) 11,458'
- Cathedral Peak 13,950'
- Centennial Peak 13,062'
- Chair Mountain 12,727'
- Chalk Benchmark 12,038'
- Challenger Point 14,087'
- Cheyenne Mountain 9,570'
- Chicago Peak 13,385'
- Chief Cheley Peak 12,809'
- Chiefs Head Peak 13,577'
- Chimney Rock 11,781'
- Chipeta Mountain 13,472'
- Cinnamon Mountain 13,336'
- Cirque Mountain 13,686'
- Clark Peak 12,960' – highest summit of the Medicine Bow Mountains
- Cleveland Peak 13,414'
- Clinton Peak 13,864'
- Cochetopa Dome 11,138'
- Colony Baldy 13,705'
- Columbia Point 13,986'
- Columbus Mountain 10,258'
- Conejos Peak 13,179'
- Conundrum Peak 14,067'
- Cottonwood Peak 13,588'
- Courthouse Mountain 12,152'
- Coxcomb Peak 13,656'
- Crater Peak 11,333' – highest summit of Grand Mesa
- Crested Butte 12,168'
- Crestone Needle 14,203'
- Crestone Peak 14,300' – highest summit of the Crestones
- Crestone East Peak 14,266'
- Cronin Peak 13,877'
- Cross Mountain 12,703'
- Crystal Peak 13,859'
- Crystal Peak 12,777'
- Culebra Peak 14,053' – highest summit of the Culebra Range
- Dallas Peak 13,815'
- Darley Mountain 13,260'
- Dawson Butte 7,474'
- De Anza Peak (Culebra Range)
- De Anza Peak (Sangre de Cristo Range)
- Devils Head 9,749' – highest summit of the Rampart Range
- Devils Playground 13,075'
- Diamond Peak 9,665'
- Diorite Peak 12,761'
- Dolores Peak 13,296'
- Dome Mountain 13,379'
- Dunsinane Mountain 12,742'
- Dyer Mountain 13,862'
- Eagles Nest 13,419'
- East Beckwith Mountain 12,441'
- East Spanish Peak 12,688'
- El Diente Peak 14,165'
- Eldorado Mountain 8,344'
- Electric Peak (San Juan Mountains)
- Electric Peak (Sangre de Cristo Range)
- Elk Mountain 11,424' (Rabbit Ears Range)
- Elk Mountain 8,727' (Elkhead Mountains)
- Ellingwood Point 14,048'
- Elliott Mountain 12,346'
- Emerald Peak 13,911'
- Emery Peak 13,321'
- Emma Burr Mountain 13,544'
- Engelmann Peak 13,368'
- Engineer Mountain 13,225'
- Engineer Mountain 12,968'
- Ervin Peak 13,538'
- Eureka Mountain 13,507'
- Fairchild Mountain 13,508'
- Fairview Peak 13,214'
- Fishers Peak 9,633' – highest summit of Raton Mesa and easternmost summit of the Rocky Mountains
- Flagstaff Mountain 6,983'
- Flat Top Mountain 12,361' – highest summit of the Flat Tops
- Fletcher Mountain 13,958'
- Fluted Peak 13,554'
- Fools Peak 12,954'
- French Mountain 13,966'
- Galena Peak 12,461'
- Garfield Peak 13,787'
- Geissler Mountain 13,381'
- Gemini Peak
- Gilpin Peak 13,700'
- Gladstone Peak 13,919'
- Goat Hill 5,604'
- Golden Horn 13,780'
- Gothic Mountain 12,631'
- Graham Peak 12,536'
- Grand Hogback
- Grand Turk 13,167'
- Grannys Nipple
- Gravel Mountain 13,596'
- Grayrock Peak 12,504'
- Grays Peak 14,278' – highest summit of the Front Range and highest point on the Continental Divide of North America
- Graystone Peak 13,489'
- Green Knoll 12,297'
- Green Mountain (Front Range) 8,148'
- Green Mountain (Front Range Rhills) 6,854'
- Green Mountain (Kenosha Mountains) 10,427'
- Greenhalgh Mountain 13,220'
- Greenhorn Mountain 12,352' – highest summit of the Wet Mountains
- Greyrock Mountain 7,616'
- Grizzly Peak (Collegiate Peaks) 13,995'
- Grizzly Peak (San Juan Mountains) 13,738'
- Grizzly Peak (Front Range) 13,433'
- Grizzly Peak (Sawatch Range) 13,309'
- Grizzly Peak (Needle Mountains)
- Hagerman Peak
- Hahns Peak 10,843'
- Hagues Peak 13,573'
- Half Peak 13,848' – highest summit of the East Central San Juan Mountains
- Hallett Peak 12,720'
- Handies Peak 14,058'
- Hayden Peak (Sneffels Range) 12,987'
- Hayden Peak (Elk Mountains) 13,570'
- Hayden Spire 12,480'
- Henry Mountain 13,261'
- Hesperus Mountain 13,237' – highest summit of the La Plata Mountains
- Highland Peak 12,381'
- Hilliard Peak 13,422'
- Horn Peak 13,450'
- Horse Mountain 9,952'
- Horsefly Peak 10,353' – highest summit of the Uncompahgre Plateau
- Horseshoe Mountain 13,905'
- Horsetooth Mountain 7,259'
- Howard Mountain 12,826'
- Huerfano Butte 6,174'
- Humboldt Peak 14,070'
- Hunter Peak 13,506'
- Huntsman Ridge 11,858'
- Hunts Peak 13,071'
- Huron Peak 14,012'
- Hurricane Peak 13,447'
- Ice Mountain 13,958'
- Iowa Peak
- Iron Mountain (Never Summer Mountains) 12,270'
- Iron Mountain (Sangre de Cristo Range) 11,416'
- Irving Peak 13,216'
- Italian Mountain 13,385'
- Jacque Peak 13,211'
- Jagged Mountain 13,830'
- James Peak 13,299'
- Jones Mountain 13,866'
- Jones Mountain (Sawatch Range) 13,218'
- Jupiter Mountain 13,836'
- Keefe Peak 13,532'
- Kendall Peak 13,455'
- Kit Carson Mountain 14,171'
- Knights Peak 10499'
- Knobby Crest 12,434' – highest summit of the Kenosha Mountains
- La Plata Peak 14,343' – fifth highest summit of the Rocky Mountains and Colorado
- Lavender Peak 13,233'
- Lead Mountain (Custer County, Colorado)
- Lead Mountain (Grand County, Colorado)
- Leon Peak 11,240'
- Little Bear Peak 14,043'
- Little Cone 11,988'
- Little Giant Peak 13,417'
- Lizard Head 13,119'
- Lone Cone 12,618'
- Lone Eagle Peak 11,946'
- Long Branch Baldy 11,982' – highest summit of the Cochetopa Hills
- Long Scraggy Peak 8,796'
- Longs Peak 14,259' – highest summit of the northern Front Range
- Lookout Mountain 7,377'
- Lookout Peak 13,661'
- Lulu Mountain 12,217'
- Malemute Peak 13,321'
- Marcellina Mountain 11,353'
- Maroon Peak 14,163'
- Matchless Mountain 12,389'
- Matterhorn Peak 13,596'
- McCurdy Mountain 12,172'
- McHenrys Peak 13,327'
- Mears Peak 13,496'
- Menefee Peak 8,832'
- Meridian Peak 12,432'
- Methodist Mountain 11,713'
- Middle Peak 13,306'
- Milwaukee Peak 13,522'
- Missouri Mountain 14,074'
- Mount Adams 13,937'
- Mount Aetna 13,745'
- Mount Alice 13,315'
- Mount Antero 14,276' – highest summit of the southern Sawatch Range
- Mount Arkansas 13,795'
- Mount Audubon 13,229'
- Mount Bailey 9,089'
- Mount Belford 14,203'
- Mount Bethel 12,705'
- Mount Bierstadt 14,065'
- Mount Blaurock 13,623'
- Mount Blue Sky 14,271' – highest summit of the Chicago Peaks
- Mount Bross 14,178'
- Mount Buckskin 13,872'
- Mount Cameron 14,238'
- Mount Champion 13,646'
- Mount Chapin 12,454'
- Mount Chiquita 13,075'
- Mount Cirrus 12,808'
- Mount Columbia 14,077'
- Mount Craig 12,007'
- Mount Cumulus 12,729'
- Mount Daly 13,323'
- Mount Democrat 14,155'
- Mount Edwards 13,856'
- **Mount Elbert** 14,440' – highest summit of the Sawatch Range, the Rocky Mountains of North America, and Colorado
- Mount Emma 13,581'
- Mount Emmons 12,401'
- Mount Eolus 14,090'
- Mount Evans (Mosquito Range)
- Mount Garfield (San Juan County, Colorado) 13,074'
- Mount Guero 12,058'
- Mount Gunnison 12,725'
- Mount Guyot 13,376'
- Mount Harvard 14,421' – highest summit of the Collegiate Peaks
- Mount Herard 13,345'
- Mount Hope 13,939'
- Mount Ida 12,865'
- Mount Jackson 13,676'
- Mount Jasper 12,923'
- Mount Julian 12,933'
- Mount Lamborn 11,402'
- Mount Lincoln 14,293' – highest summit of the Mosquito Range
- Mount Lindsey 14,048
- Mount Logan (Garfield County, Colorado) 8,413'
- Mount Mahler 12,497'
- Mount Massive 14,428' – second highest summit of the Rocky Mountains and Colorado
- Mount McConnel 8,012'
- Mount Meeker 13,916'
- Mount Mestas 11,573'
- Mount Morrison 7,881'
- Mount Moss 13,192'
- Mount of the Holy Cross 14,011' – highest summit of the northern Sawatch Range
- Mount Nimbus 12,721'
- Mount Oklahoma 13,852'
- Mount Oso 13,690'
- Mount Otto 12,865'
- Mount Ouray 13,961' – highest summit of the far southern Sawatch Range
- Mount Owen 13,070' – highest summit of the Ruby Range
- Mount Oxford 14,160'
- Mount Parnassus 13,580'
- Mount Powell 13,586' – highest summit of the Gore Range
- Mount Princeton 14,204'
- Mount Richthofen 12,945' – highest summit of the Never Summer Mountains
- Mount Ridgway 13,468'
- Mount Rosa 11,504'
- Mount Shavano 14,235'
- Mount Sheridan 13,748'
- Mount Sherman 14,043'
- Mount Silverheels 13,829'
- Mount Sneffels 14,158' – highest summit of the Sneffels Range
- Mount Sniktau 13,240'
- Mount Sopris 12,958'
- Mount Spalding
- Mount Stratus 12,534'
- Mount Toll 12,979'
- Mount Tweto 13,672'
- Mount Werner 10,570'
- Mount White 13,667'
- Mount Wilson 14,252' – highest summit of the San Miguel Mountains
- Mount Yale 14,202'
- Mount Zion 7,062'
- Mount Zirkel 12,185' – highest summit of the Park Range
- Mount Zwischen 12,011'
- Mummy Mountain 13,430'
- Navajo Peak 13,409'
- Needle Rock 7,797'
- Never Summer Peak 12,452'
- Niagara Peak 13,812'
- Nokhu Crags 12,490'
- North Arapaho Peak 13,508' – highest summit of the Indian Peaks
- North Eolus 14,045'
- North Mamm Peak 11,129'
- North Pole Peak 12,208'
- North Maroon Peak 14,019'
- North Star Mountain 13,614'
- North Table Mountain 6,555'
- Notch Mountain 13,243'
- Organ Mountain 13,032'
- Otis Peak 12,486'
- Ouray Peak 12,963'
- Pacific Peak 13,957'
- Pagoda Mountain 13,497'
- Paiute Peak 13,088'
- Palmyra Peak 13,319'
- Parika Peak 12,402'
- Park Cone 12,106'
- Parkview Mountain 12,301' – highest summit of the Rabbit Ears Range
- Parry Peak 13,397'
- Pawnee Peak 12,943'
- Peak 10 13,640'
- Peak One 12,805'
- Peak 13762 13,769'
- Pearl Mountain 13,379'
- Petit Grepon (spire) 12,305'
- Pettingell Peak 13,559'
- Phoenix Peak 13,902' – highest summit of the La Garita Mountains
- Pico Aislado 13,611'
- Pigeon Peak 13,978'
- Pikes Peak 14,115' – highest summit of southern Front Range
- Pilot Knob 13,738'
- Piñon Mesa High Point 9,705'
- Pintada Mountain 12,840'
- Point Lookout 8,427'
- Potosi Peak 13,786'
- Precipice Peak 13,144'
- Proposal Peak 13,339'
- Ptarmigan Peak 12,504' – highest summit of South Williams Fork Mountains
- Puma Peak 11,575'
- Purple Mountain 12,958'
- Purple Peak 12,800'
- Pyramid Peak 14,025'
- Quail Mountain 13,465'
- Quandary Peak 14,271' – highest summit of the Tenmile Range
- Red Mountain (Culebra Range) 13,914'
- Red Mountain (Never Summer Mountains)
- Red Mountain Number 1 (San Juan Mountains) 12,598'
- Red Mountain Number 2 (San Juan Mountains) 12,225'
- Red Mountain Number 3 (San Juan Mountains) 12,896'
- Red Peak (Front Range)
- Red Peak (Gore Range)
- Red Table Mountain 12,043'
- Redcliff 13,642'
- Redcloud Peak 14,041'
- Rinker Peak 13,789'
- Rio Grande Pyramid 13,827'
- Rito Alto Peak 13,803'
- Ruby Mountain 13,277'
- San Luis Peak 14,022'
- Sand Mountain North 10,884' – highest summit of the Elkhead Mountains
- Sawtooth Mountain 12,304'
- Sawtooth Mountain 12,153'
- Sayres Benchmark 13,746'
- Seven Utes Mountain 11,478'
- Sharkstooth Peak 11,691'
- Shawnee Peak 11,932'
- Sheep Mountain (Gunnison County)
- Sheep Mountain (San Juan County)
- Sheep Mountain (San Miguel Mountains) 13,188'
- Shoshoni Peak 12,967'
- Sievers Mountain 12,786'
- Silver King Peak 13,769'
- Silver Mountain (Huerfano County) 10,525'
- Silver Mountain (San Miguel County) 13,470'
- Sleeping Sexton 13,457'
- Sleepy Cat Peak 10,853'
- Snowdon Peak 13,077'
- Snowmass Mountain 14,099'
- Snowmass Peak 13,627'
- South Bald Mountain 11,009' – highest summit of the Laramie Mountains
- South Bross Peak 14,027'
- South River Peak 13,154'
- South Table Mountain 6,338'
- Specimen Mountain 12,494'
- Spiller Peak 13,123'
- Sprague Mountain 12,713'
- Spread Eagle Peak 13,423'
- Square Top Mountain 13,794'
- Star Mountain 12,941'
- Star Peak 13,527'
- Static Peak 12,580'
- Stewart Peak 13,990'
- Stones Peak 12,922'
- Stony Mountain 12,698'
- Storm King Mountain 8,797'
- Storm Peak (Front Range)
- Storm Peak 13,495'
- Sugarloaf Mountain
- Sultan Mountain 13,373'
- Summit Peak 13,308' – highest summit of the southern San Juan Mountains
- Sunlight Peak 14,065'
- Sunlight Spire 14,001'
- Sunshine Mountain 12,930'
- Sunshine Mountain 13,329'
- Sunshine Peak 14,007'
- Tabeguache Peak 14,162'
- Tanks Peak 8,726'
- Taylor Peak 13,158'
- Taylor Peak (Gunnison County) 13,435'
- Teakettle Mountain 13,825'
- Tenmile Peak 12,938'
- Terra Tomah Mountain 12,718'
- Terrible Mountain
- Thatchtop 12,668'
- The Castles 12,296'
- The Diamond (escarpment)
- The Horns (outcrop) 9,226'
- The Sawtooth (arête) 13,786'
- The Sharkstooth 12,630'
- The Spider 12,695'
- Thirtynine Mile Mountain 11,553'
- Thunder Butte 9,837' – highest summit of the Rampart Range
- Thunder Mountain 13,108'
- Tijeras Peak 13,610'
- Tomichi Dome 11,471'
- Torreys Peak 14,274'
- Tower Mountain 13,558'
- Traver Peak
- Treasure Mountain 13,535'
- Trinity Peaks
- Turner Peak 13,233'
- Turret Peak 13,841'
- Tuttle Mountain 13,208'
- Twilight Peak 13,163' – highest summit of the West Needle Mountains
- Twining Peak 13,711'
- Twin Peaks 13,341'
- Twin Peaks 10,970'
- Twin Peaks 13,580'
- Twin Sisters 13,432'
- Twin Sisters Peaks 11,433'
- Two Buttes 4,713'
- Ulysses S Grant Peak 13,767'
- Uncompahgre Peak 14,321' – highest summit of the San Juan Mountains
- United States Mountain 13,036'
- Ute Peak 9,984' – highest summit of the Ute Mountains
- Vermilion Peak 13,900'
- Vestal Peak 13,870' – highest summit of the Grenadier Range
- Wasatch Mountain 13,555'
- Waugh Mountain 11,716' – highest summit of the South Park Hills
- West Beckwith Mountain 12,185'
- West Buffalo Peak 13,332'
- West Elk Peak 13,042' – highest summit of the West Elk Mountains
- West Spanish Peak 13,631' – highest summit of the Spanish Peaks
- Wetterhorn Peak 14,021'
- Wheeler Mountain 13,690'
- Whetstone Mountain 12,527'
- Whitecross Mountain 13,553'
- Whitehouse Mountain 13,492'
- Wildhorse Peak 13,266'
- Williams Peak 11,620'
- Wilson Peak 14,023'
- Windom Peak 14,093' – highest summit of the Needle Mountains
- Windy Peak 11,970'
- Winfield Peak 13,084'
- Wood Mountain 13,682'
- Ypsilon Mountain 13,520'
- Zenobia Peak 9,022' – highest summit of the far eastern Uinta Mountains

=== Connecticut ===
- Bear Mountain
- Mount Sanford
- The southern flank of **Mount Frissell** is the highest point of the State of Connecticut.

=== Georgia ===
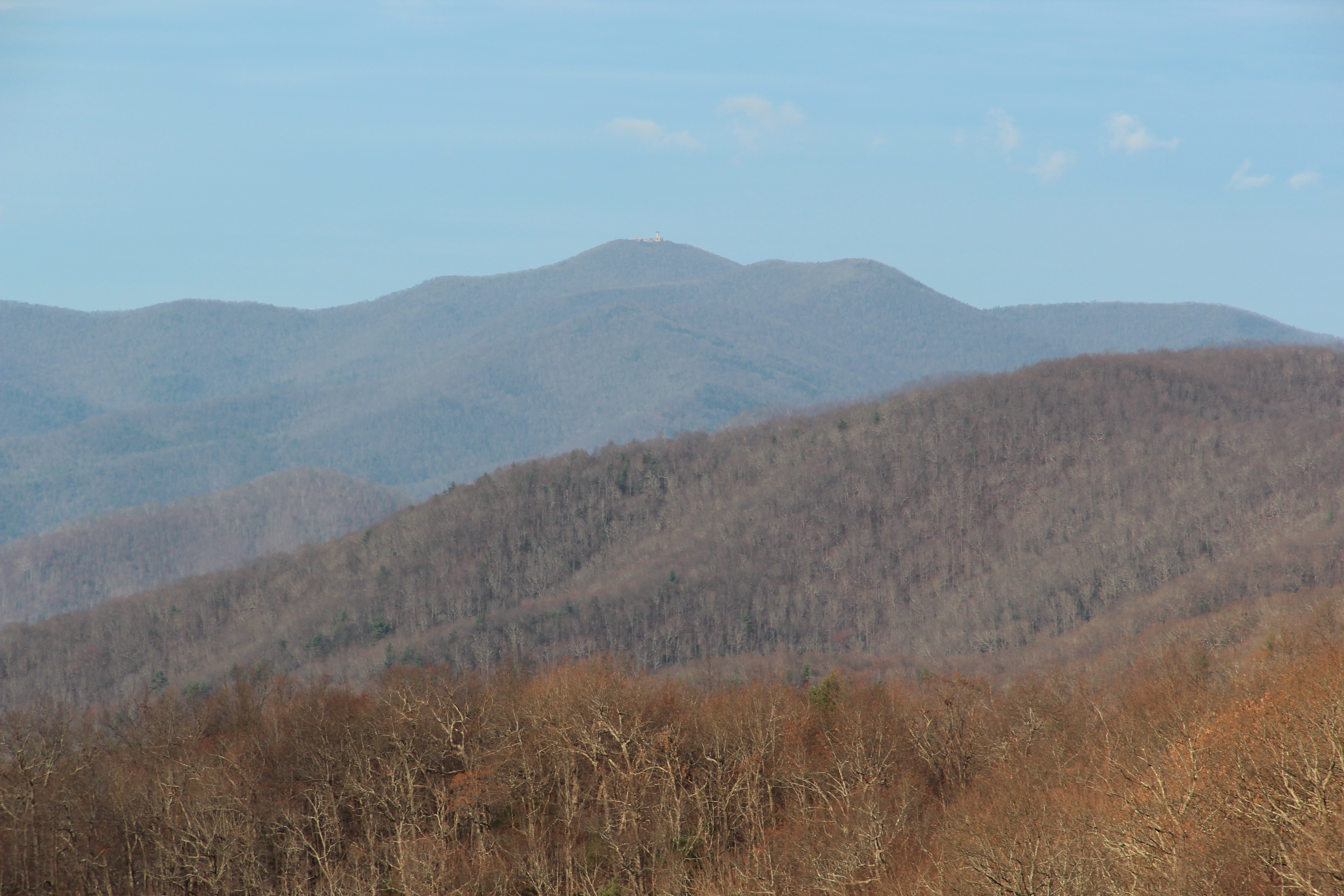
Brasstown Bald

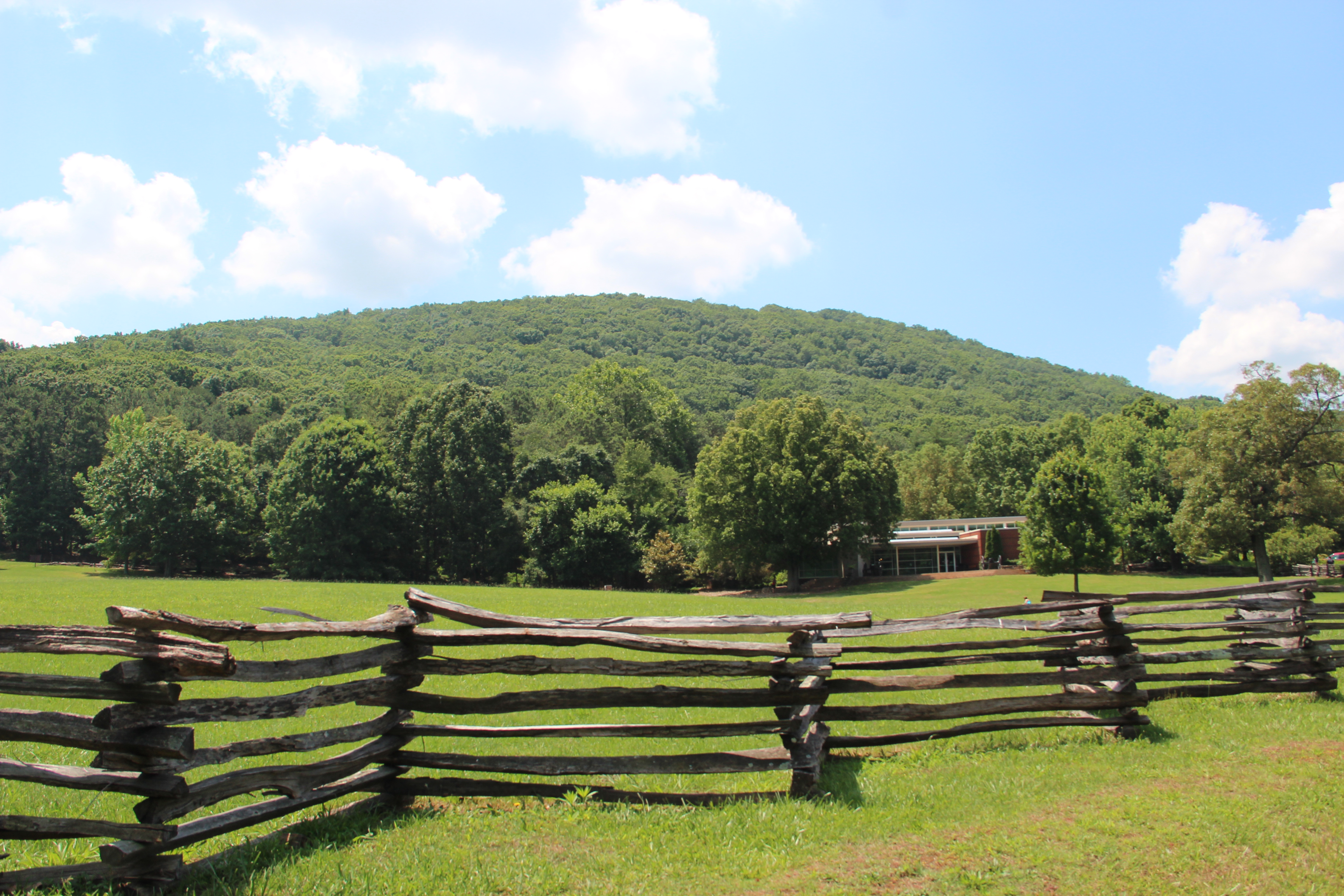
Kennesaw Mountain

- Arabia Mountain
- Big Bald Mountain
- Black Mountain
- Blood Mountain
- **Brasstown Bald**, highest summit of the U.S. state of Georgia
- Coosa Bald
- Cowrock Mountain
- Currahee Mountain
- Dick's Knob
- Double Spring Knob
- Flat Top
- Glade Mountain
- Grassy Ridge
- Hightower Bald
- Horsetrough Mountain
- Kennesaw Mountain
- Levelland Mountain
- Little Kennesaw Mountain
- Lookout Mountain
- Mount Oglethorpe
- Pine Mountain
- Rabun Bald
- Rich Knob
- Rich Mountain
- Rock Mountain
- Rocky Knob
- Rocky Mountain
- Screamer Mountain
- Slaughter Mountain
- Springer Mountain
- Stone Mountain
- Sweat Mountain
- Three Sisters
- Tray Mountain
- Unicoi Range
- Wildcat Mountain
- Wolfpen Ridge
- Yonah Mountain
- Young Lick

=== Guam ===
- Mount Alifan, summit of the Island of Guam
- Mount Almagosa, summit of the Island of Guam and the 4th highest summit of the Territory of Guam
- Mount Bolanos, summit of the Island of Guam and the 3rd highest summit of the Territory of Guam
- Mount Jumullong Manglo, summit of the Island of Guam and the 2nd highest summit of the Territory of Guam
- **Mount Lamlam**, summit of the Island of Guam and the highest summit of the Territory of Guam

=== Hawaiʻi ===
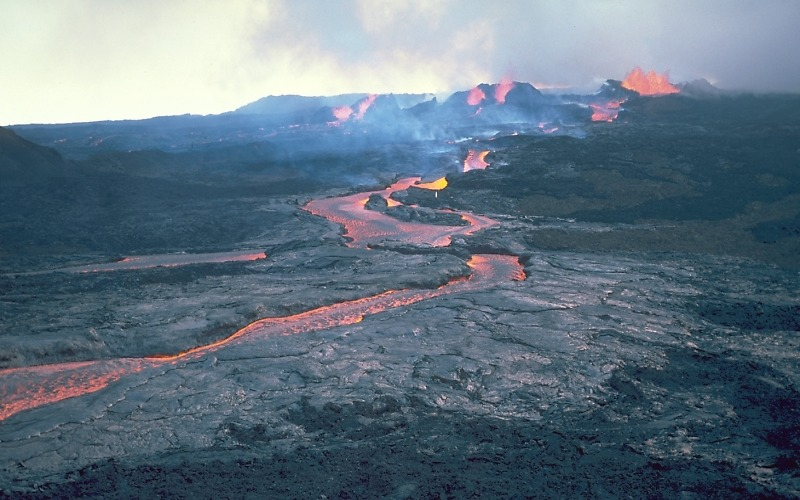
Mauna Loa

- Haleakalā, shield volcano that is the summit of the Island of Maui
- Hualālai, shield volcano on the Island of Hawaiʻi
- Kaʻala, shield volcano that is the summit of the Island of Oʻahu
- Kamakou, shield volcano that is the summit of the Island of Molokaʻi
- Kawaikini, shield volcano that is the summit of the Island of Kauaʻi
- Kīlauea, active shield volcano on the Island of Hawaiʻi
- Kohala, shield volcano on the Island of Hawaiʻi
- Lānaʻihale, shield volcano that is the summit of the Island of Lānaʻi
- **Mauna Kea**, shield volcano that is the summit of the Island of Hawaiʻi, the highest summit of the State of Hawaiʻi, and the tallest mountain on Earth as measured from base to summit
- Mauna Loa, active shield volcano that is the most voluminous mountain on Earth
- Puʻu Aliʻi, summit of the Island of Molokaʻi
- Puʻu Kukui, shield volcano on the Island of Maui
- Tantalus, cinder cone on the Island of Oʻahu

=== Idaho ===
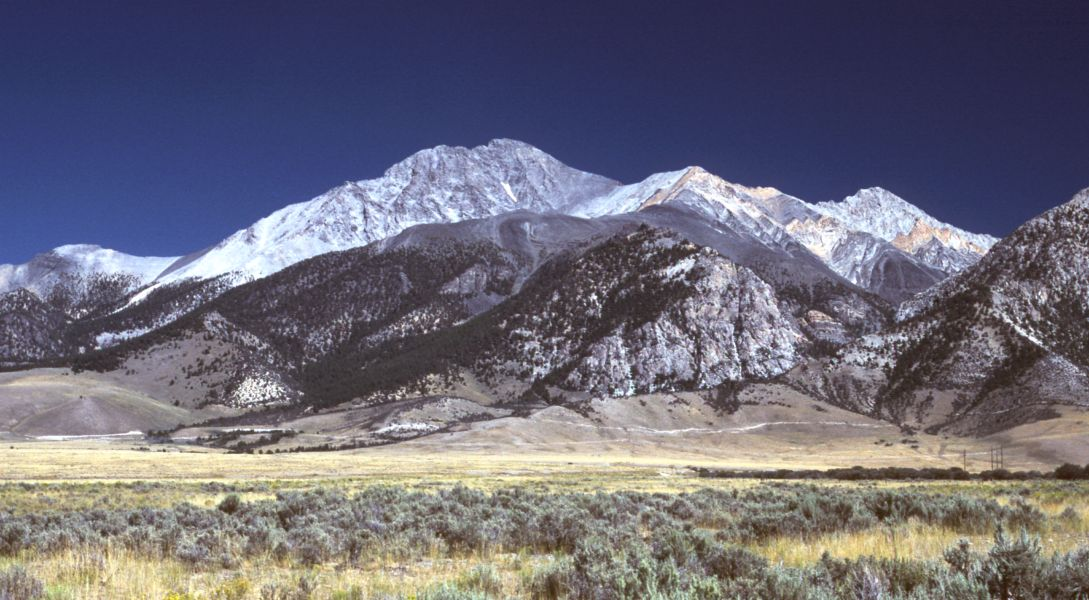
Borah Peak

- Big Baldy
- Big Dick Point
- Black Pine Mountains High Point
- Blizzard Mountain
- Bonneville Peak, highest summit of the Portneuf Range
- **Borah Peak**, highest summit of the Lost River Range and the State of Idaho
- Boulder Peak
- Buffalo Hump
- Cache Peak
- Caribou Mountain, highest summit of the Caribou Range
- Castle Peak, highest summit of the White Cloud Mountains
- Chimney Rock
- Cinnabar Mountain
- Deep Creek Peak, highest summit of the Deep Creek Mountains
- Diamond Peak, highest summit of the Lemhi Range
- Doublespring Peak
- Easley Peak
- East Butte
- Elkhorn Peak
- Fishfin Ridge
- Freeman Peak
- Galena Peak
- Grandjean Peak
- He Devil
- Hyndman Peak, highest summit of the Pioneer Mountains
- Kings Peak
- Larkins Peak
- Leatherman Peak
- Little Regret Peak
- Meade Peak, highest summit of the Peale Mountains
- Mica Peak- consists of two peaks, one in Idaho, and one in Washington.
- Middle Butte
- Monte Verita
- Mount Corruption
- Mount Cramer
- Mount Heyburn
- Mount Jefferson
- Mount McCaleb
- Mount McGuire
- Mount Morrison
- Mystery Mountain
- North Loon Mountain
- North Raker
- Oxford Peak, highest summit of the Bannock Range
- Queen Mountain
- Ryan Peak, highest summit of the Boulder Mountains
- Sacajawea Peak
- Saviers Peak, highest summit of the Smoky Mountains
- Scotchman Peak
- Scott Peak
- Sedgwick Peak
- Silver Peak
- Smoky Dome, highest summit of the Soldier Mountains
- Snowy Top
- South Lost River High Point
- Stripe Mountain
- Sturgill Peak
- The General
- Thompson Peak, highest summit of the Sawtooth Mountains
- Tohobit Peak
- USGS Peak
- White Cap Peak
- White Mountain West
- Williams Peak

=== Illinois ===
- Bald Knob
- **Charles Mound**, highest summit of the State of Illinois
- Chestnut Mountain

=== Kansas ===
- **Mount Sunflower**, highest summit of the State of Kansas
- Flint Hills
- Red Hills
- Mount Oread
- Mount Bleu
- Well’s Overlook

=== Kentucky ===
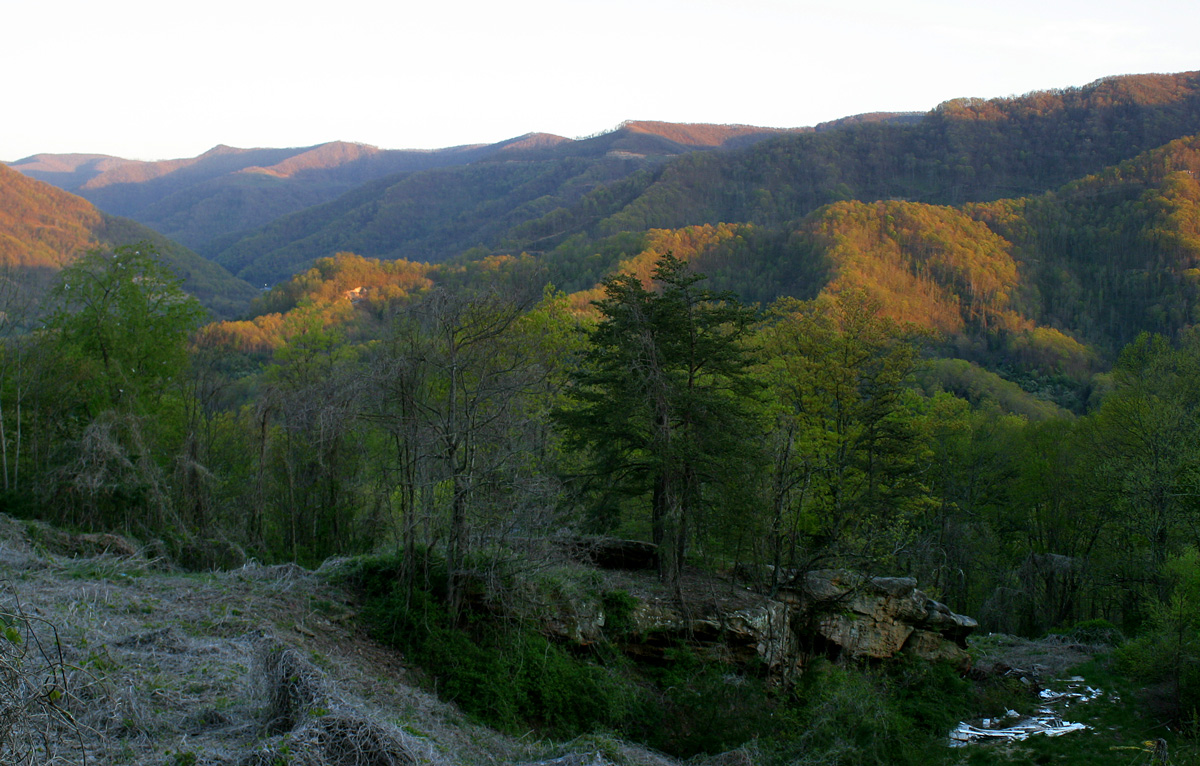
Black Mountain

- **Black Mountain**, highest summit of the Commonwealth of Kentucky
- Frenchman Knob
- Indian Hill (Edmonson County, Kentucky)
- Whoopee Hill
- Tri-State Peak
- Stuffley Knob (Johnson County, Kentucky)
- Pine Mountain

=== Louisiana ===
- **Driskill Mountain**, highest summit of the State of Louisiana

=== Maine ===
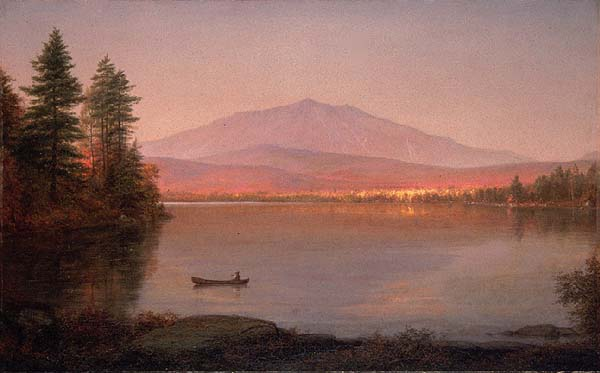
Katahdin

- Cadillac Mountain, summit of Mount Desert Island
- **Katahdin**, highest summit of the State of Maine
- Mount Jefferson
- Mount Bigelow
- Shawnee Peak, Bridgton, Maine
- Sugarloaf Mountain
- Mount Abraham
- Baldpate Mountain
- Crocker Mountain
- Old Speck Mountain
- North Brother

=== Maryland ===
- Backbone Mountain
- Catoctin Mountain
- Dans Mountain
- Evitts Mountain
- **Hoye-Crest**, highest summit of the State of Maryland
- Negro Mountain
- Polish Mountain
- Sideling Hill
- South Mountain
- Sugarloaf Mountain

=== Massachusetts ===
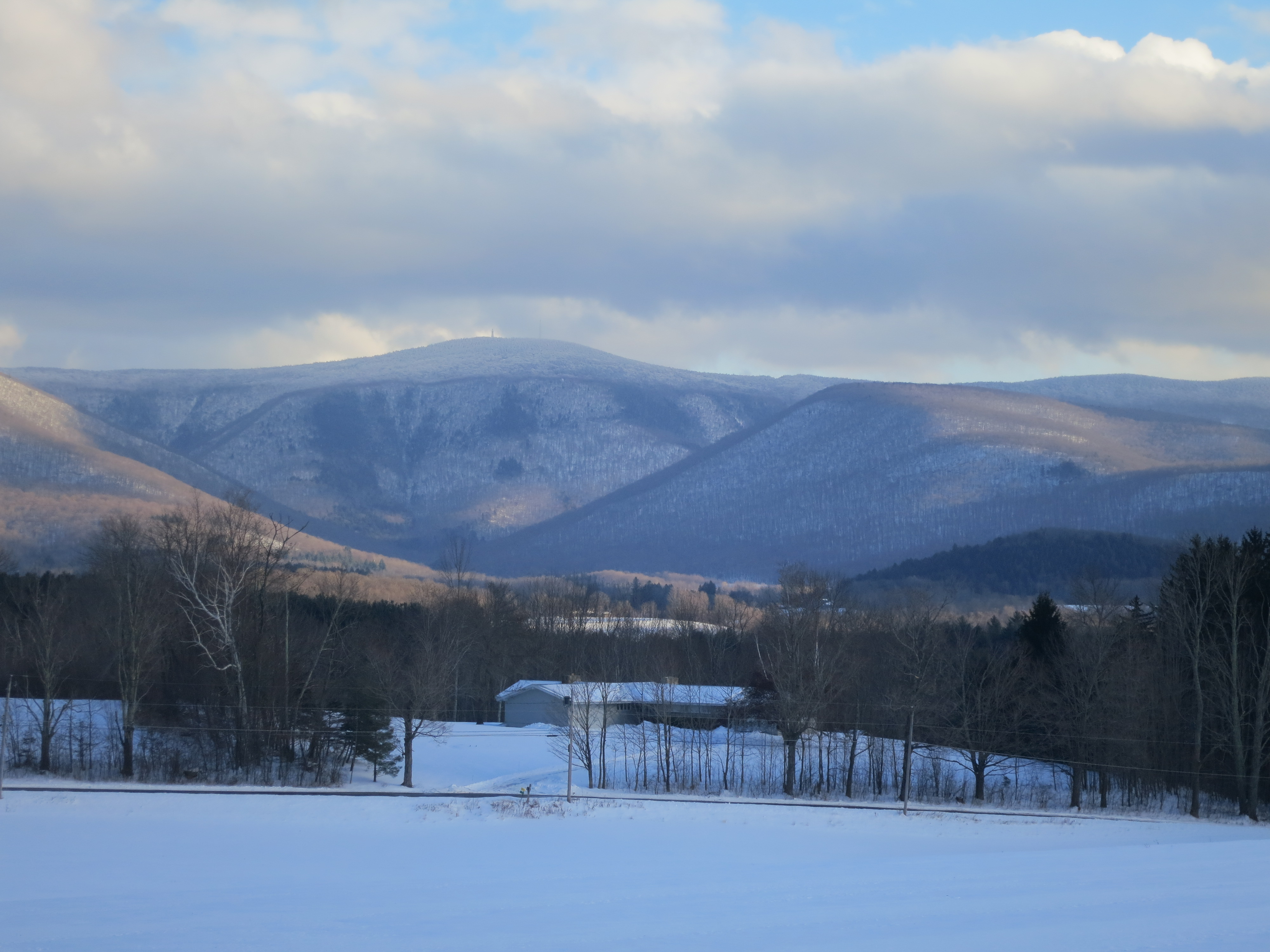
Mount Greylock

- Bakke Mountain
- Mount Everett
- **Mount Greylock**, highest summit of the Commonwealth of Massachusetts
- Mount Jefferson
- Mount Tom
- Tekoa Mountain
- Tower Mountain
- Mount Wachusett

=== Michigan ===
- **Mount Arvon**, highest summit of the State of Michigan
- Mount Curwood
- Mount Desor
- Huron Mountains
- Porcupine Mountains

=== Minnesota ===
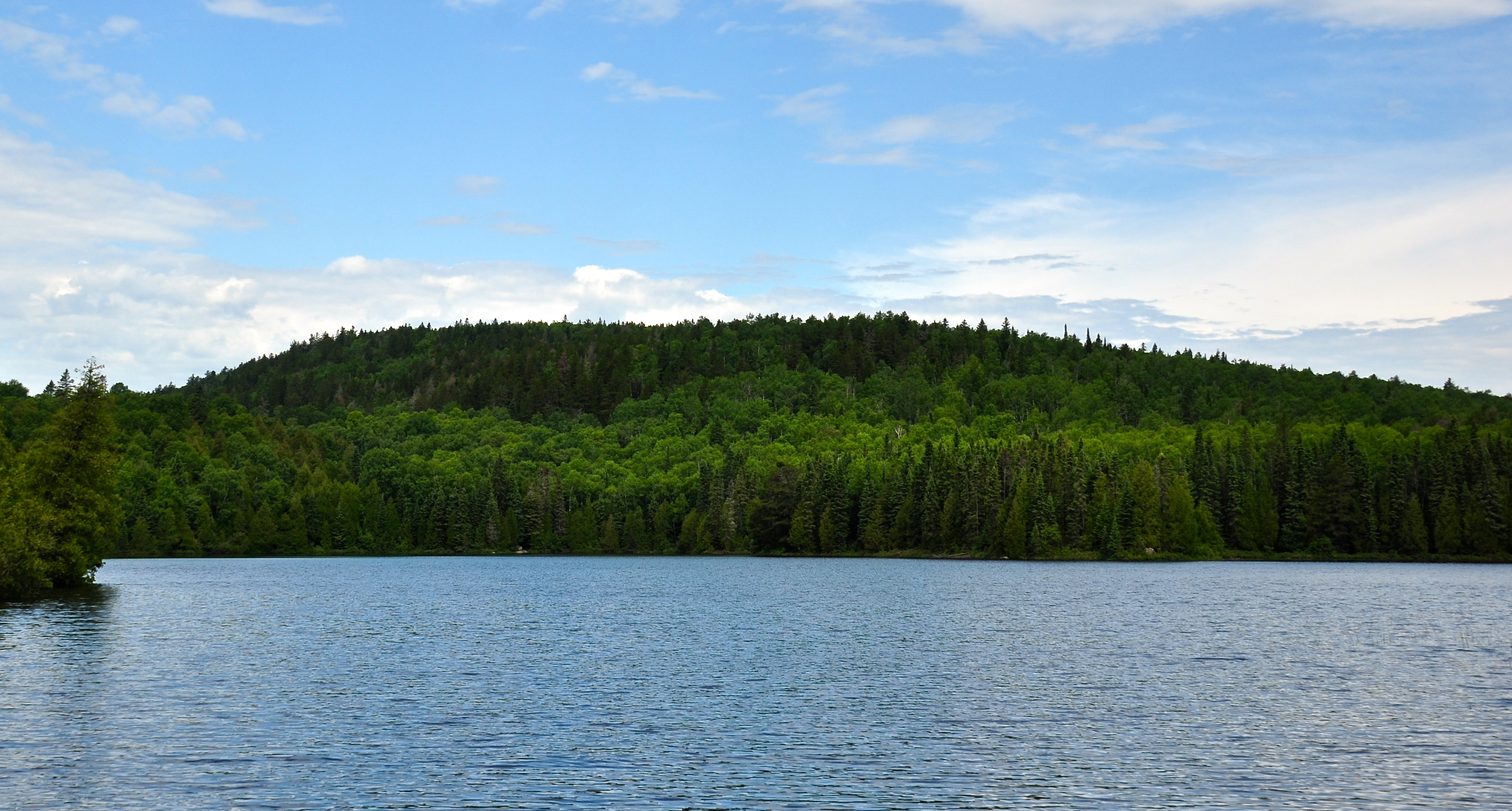
Eagle Mountain

- **Eagle Mountain**, highest summit of the State of Minnesota
- Disappointment Mountain

=== Mississippi ===
- **Woodall Mountain**, highest summit of the State of Mississippi

=== Missouri ===
- Bell Mountain
- Ozark Mountain
- **Taum Sauk Mountain**, highest summit of the State of Missouri
- Wildcat Mountain

=== Montana ===
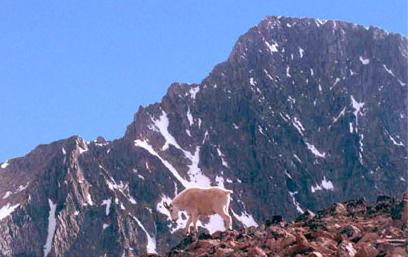
Granite Peak

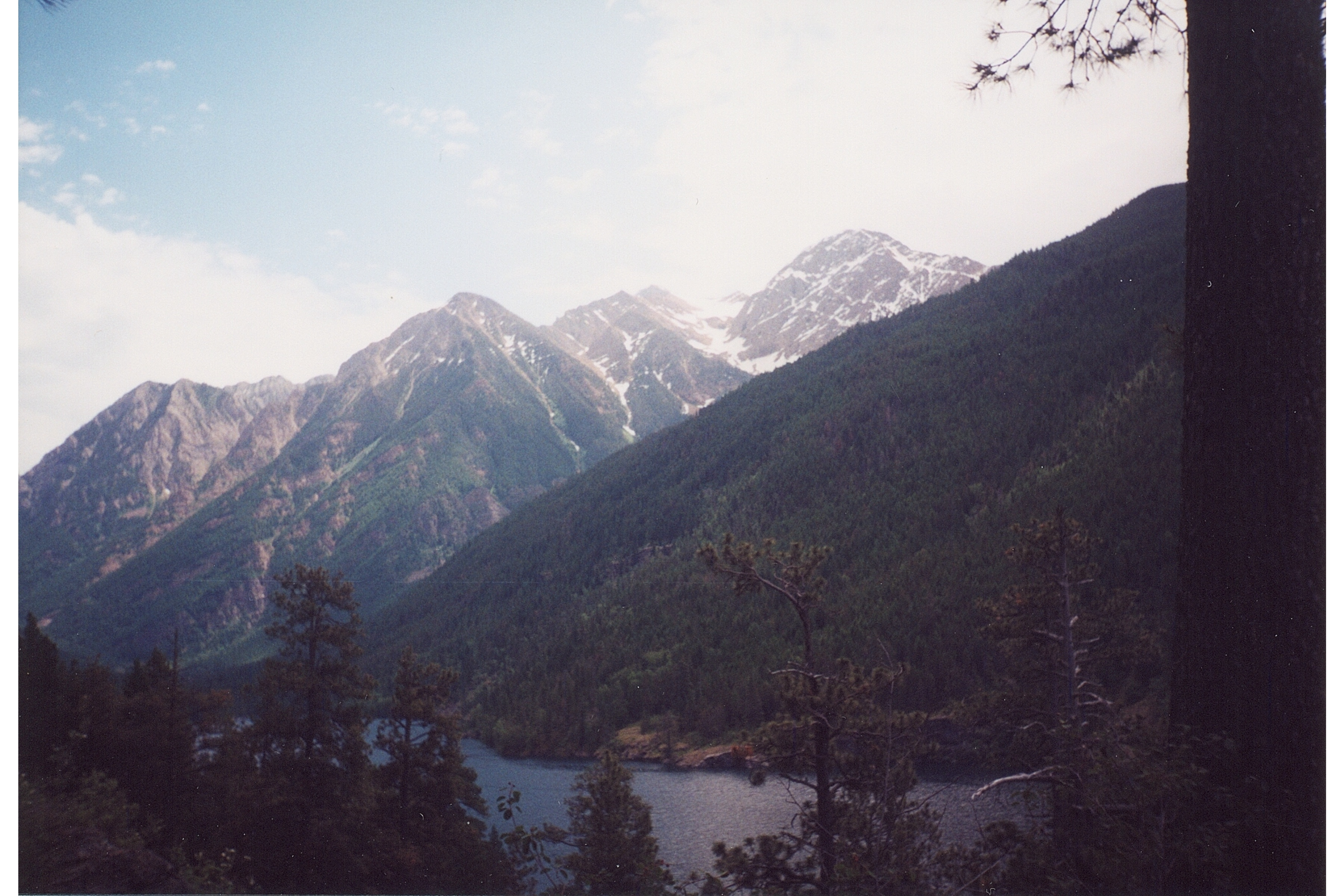
McDonald Peak

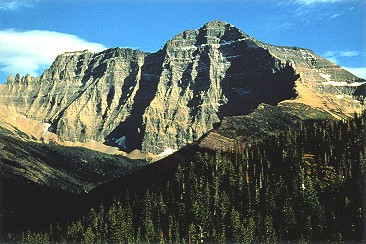
Mount Cleveland

- A Peak
- Ahern Peak, Glacier National Park
- Allen Mountain, Glacier National Park
- Almost-a-Dog Mountain, Glacier National Park
- Amphitheater Mountain, Glacier National Park
- Anaconda Peak, Glacier National Park
- Angel Wing, Glacier National Park
- Apikuni Mountain, Glacier National Park
- Appistoki Peak, Glacier National Park
- Argosy Mountain
- Ash Mountain
- Bad Marriage Mountain, Glacier National Park
- Baldy Mountain (Bearpaw Mountains)
- Baldy Mountain (Idaho/Montana)
- Baldy Mountain (Salish Mountains)
- Battlement Mountain, Glacier National Park
- Bear Mountain, Glacier National Park
- Bearhat Mountain, Glacier National Park
- Bearhead Mountain, Glacier National Park
- Beehive Peak
- Big Baldy Mountains
- Big Horn Peak
- Big Pryor Mountain
- Bishops Cap, Glacier National Park
- Black Butte
- Black Mountain
- Blackfoot Mountain, Glacier National Park
- Blaze Mountain
- Blue Mountain
- Boat Mountain
- Boulder Peak, Glacier National Park
- Brave Dog Mountain, Glacier National Park
- Calf Robe Mountain, Glacier National Park
- Campbell Mountain, Glacier National Park
- Caper Peak, Glacier National Park
- Capitol Mountain
- Castle Mountain
- Castle Reef
- Cathedral Peak, Glacier National Park
- Cedar Mountain
- Chapman Peak, Glacier National Park
- Charlotte Peak
- Chief Mountain, Glacier National Park
- Choteau Mountain
- Church Butte, Glacier National Park
- Citadel Mountain, Glacier National Park
- Citadel Peaks, Glacier National Park
- Clements Mountain, Glacier National Park
- Cloudcroft Peaks, Glacier National Park
- Clyde Peak, Glacier National Park
- Como Peaks
- Cracker Peak, Glacier National Park
- Crazy Peak
- Crow Peak
- Crowfeet Mountain, Glacier National Park
- Crown Butte
- Crypt Peak, Glacier National Park
- Curly Bear Mountain, Glacier National Park
- Cutoff Mountain
- Divide Mountain, Glacier National Park
- Dragons Tail, Glacier National Park
- Eagle Plume Mountain, Glacier National Park
- Eagle Ribs Mountain, Glacier National Park
- Eaglehead Mountain, Glacier National Park
- Ear Mountain
- East Flattop Mountain, Glacier National Park
- Edwards Mountain, Glacier National Park
- Electric Peak
- Elephant Peak
- Elk Mountain, Glacier National Park
- Engle Peak
- Fisher Mountain
- Flat Top Mountain
- Flinsch Peak, Glacier National Park
- Fusillade Mountain, Glacier National Park
- Gable Mountain, Glacier National Park
- Gable Peaks
- Gallatin Peak
- Gardner Point, Glacier National Park
- Garfield Mountain
- Goat Haunt Mountain, Glacier National Park
- Goat Mountain, Glacier National Park
- Going to the Sun Mountain, Glacier National Park
- Gold Butte
- **Granite Peak**, highest summit of the State of Montana
- Greathouse Peak
- Great Northern Mountain
- Grizzly Mountain, Glacier National Park
- Gunsight Mountain, Glacier National Park
- Hardscrabble Peak
- Haugan Mountain
- Haystack Butte, Glacier National Park
- Heavenly Twins
- Heavens Peak, Glacier National Park
- Henderson Mountain
- Highwood Baldy
- Hilgard Peak
- Holland Peak
- Hollowtop Mountain
- Homer Youngs Peak
- Ibex Peak
- Iceberg Peak, Glacier National Park
- Ipasha Peak, Glacier National Park
- Jumbo Mountain, Powell County
- Kaina Mountain, Glacier National Park
- Kaiser Point, Glacier National Park
- Kinnerly Peak, Glacier National Park
- Kintla Peak, highest summit in the Livingston Range, Glacier National Park
- Kootenai Peak, Glacier National Park
- Kupunkamint Mountain, Glacier National Park
- Little Chief Mountain, Glacier National Park
- Little Dog Mountain, Glacier National Park
- Little Matterhorn, Glacier National Park
- Logging Mountain, Glacier National Park
- Lonesome Mountain
- Lone Walker Mountain, Glacier National Park
- Long Knife Peak, highest summit in the Clark Range Glacier National Park
- Longfellow Peak, Glacier National Park
- Mad Wolf Mountain, Glacier National Park
- Mahtotopa Mountain, Glacier National Park
- Matahpi Peak, Glacier National Park
- McClintock Peak, Glacier National Park
- McDonald Peak, highest summit of the Mission Mountains
- McLeod Peak
- McPartland Mountain, Glacier National Park
- Medicine Grizzly Peak, Glacier National Park
- Medicine Owl Peak, Glacier National Park
- Miche Wabun Peak, Glacier National Park
- Miller Mountain
- Mount Abundance
- Mount Blackmore
- Mount Bole
- Mount Brown, Glacier National Park
- Mount Brown, Sweet Grass Hills
- Mount Cannon, Glacier National Park
- Mount Carter, Glacier National Park
- Mount Cleveland, highest summit in the Lewis Range, Glacier National Park
- Mount Custer, Glacier National Park
- Mount Delano
- Mount Despair, Glacier National Park
- Mount Doody, Glacier National Park
- Mount Edith
- Mount Ellsworth, Glacier National Park
- Mount Frazier
- Mount Geduhn, Glacier National Park
- Mount Gould, Glacier National Park
- Mount Grant
- Mount Headley
- Mount Helen, Glacier National Park
- Mount Henkel, Glacier National Park
- Mount Henry, Glacier National Park
- Mount Jackson (Montana), Glacier National Park
- Mount James, Glacier National Park
- Mount Jefferson, Bitterroot Range
- Mount Jefferson, Tobacco Root Mountains
- Mount Kipp, Glacier National Park
- Mount Lebanon
- Mount Logan, Glacier National Park
- Mount Merritt, Glacier National Park
- Mount Morgan, Glacier National Park
- Mount Oberlin, Glacier National Park
- Mount Peabody, Glacier National Park
- Mount Phillips, Glacier National Park
- Mount Pinchot, Glacier National Park
- Mount Powell - highest summit of the Flint Creek Range
- Mount Powell in Powell County, Montana
- Mount Rockwell, Glacier National Park
- Mount Saint Nicholas, Glacier National Park
- Mount Siyeh, Glacier National Park
- Mount Stimson, Glacier National Park
- Mount Thompson, Glacier National Park
- Mount Vaught, Glacier National Park
- Mount Wilbur, Glacier National Park
- Mount Wood
- Nahsukin Mountain, Glacier National Park
- Natoas Peak, Glacier National Park
- Naya Nuki Peak
- Norris Mountain, Glacier National Park
- Northwest Peak
- Numa Peak, Glacier National Park
- Nyack Mountain
- O'Brien Mountain
- Ojibway Peak
- Old Baldy
- Old Man of the Hills
- Parke Peak, Glacier National Park
- Paul Bunyans Cabin, Glacier National Park
- Penrose Peak
- Pentagon Mountain
- Peril Peak, Glacier National Park
- Piegan Mountain, Glacier National Park
- Pollock Mountain, Glacier National Park
- Pomp Peak
- Porcupine Ridge, Glacier National Park
- Pyramid Peak, Glacier National Park
- Rainbow Peak, Glacier National Park
- Ramshorn Peak
- Razoredge Mountain, Glacier National Park
- Red Crow Mountain, Glacier National Park
- Red Mountain, Glacier National Park
- Red Mountain, Lewis and Clark County
- Red Eagle Mountain, Glacier National Park
- Redhorn Peak, Glacier National Park
- Reuter Peak, Glacier National Park
- Reynolds Mountain, Glacier National Park
- Rising Wolf Mountain, Glacier National Park
- Robinson Mountain
- Rock Peak
- Rocky Mountain
- Ross Peak
- Sacagawea Peak
- Saddle Peak
- Saint Joseph Peak
- Saint Mary Peak
- Saint Paul Peak
- Sarcee Mountain, Glacier National Park
- Sawtooth Ridge
- Scenic Point, Glacier National Park
- Scotch Bonnet Mountain
- Sentinel Mountain, Glacier National Park
- Seward Mountain, Glacier National Park
- Shaheeya Peak, Glacier National Park
- Sheep Mountain, Glacier National Park
- Sheep Mountain, Absaroka Range
- Sheep Mountain, Beartooth Mountains
- Sheep Mountain, Gallatin Range
- Sherburne Peak, Glacier National Park
- Sinopah Mountain, Glacier National Park
- Snowshoe Peak, highest summit in the Cabinet Mountains
- South Sheep Mountain
- Split Mountain, Glacier National Park
- Spot Mountain, Glacier National Park
- Square Peak, Glacier National Park
- Squaw Peak
- Steamboat Mountain
- Stoney Indian Peaks, Glacier National Park
- Summit Mountain, Glacier National Park
- Sunset Peak
- Swiftcurrent Mountain, Glacier National Park
- Table Mountain
- Taylor Mountain
- The Guardhouse, Glacier National Park
- Thunderbird Mountain, Glacier National Park
- Thunder Mountain
- Tinkham Mountain, Glacier National Park
- Trapper Peak
- Triple Divide Peak, Glacier National Park
- Tumble Mountain
- Tweedy Mountain
- Union Mountain
- Vigil Peak, Glacier National Park
- Vulture Peak, Glacier National Park
- Wahcheechee Mountain, Glacier National Park
- Walton Mountain, Glacier National Park
- West Butte
- West Goat Peak
- White Calf Mountain, Glacier National Park
- Wolf Mountain
- Wolftail Mountain, Glacier National Park
- Wynn Mountain, Glacier National Park
- Yellow Mountain, Glacier National Park

=== Nebraska ===
- Bighorn Mountain
- Scotts Bluff
- Wildcat Hills

=== Nevada ===
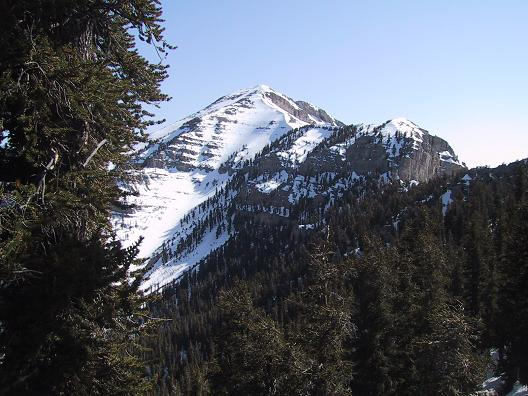
Mount Charleston

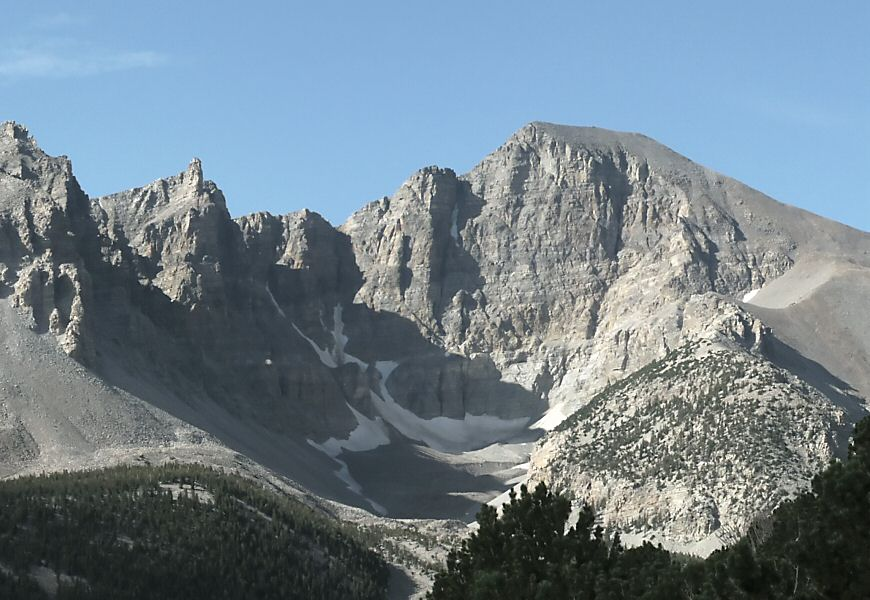
Wheeler Peak

- Arc Dome
- Baker Peak
- Bens Peak
- **Boundary Peak**, highest summit of the State of Nevada
- Bridge Mountain
- Granite Peak
- Harris Mountain
- Hayford Peak
- Humboldt Peak
- Keas Peak
- King Peak
- Kumiva Peak
- Lake Peak
- Liberty Peak
- Lincoln Peak
- Luxor Peak
- Macks Peak
- Matterhorn
- Meeker Peak
- Mount Charleston
- Mount Fitzgerald
- Mount Grafton
- Mount Houghton
- Mount Jefferson
- Mount Limbo
- Mount Moriah
- Mount Neva
- Mount Wilson
- Mummy Mountain
- Big Bald Mountain
- Little Bald Mountain
- North Schell Peak
- Old Razorback Mountain
- Pilot Peak
- Purgatory Peak
- Pyramid Peak
- Rainbow Mountain
- Relay Peak
- Rose Knob Peak
- Ruby Dome
- Selenite Peak
- Snow Lake Peak
- Star Peak
- Tamarack Peak
- The Sisters
- Thomas Peak
- Tikaboo Peak
- Tipton Peak
- Turtlehead Mountain
- Ward Mountain
- Wheeler Peak
- Worthington Peak

=== New Hampshire ===
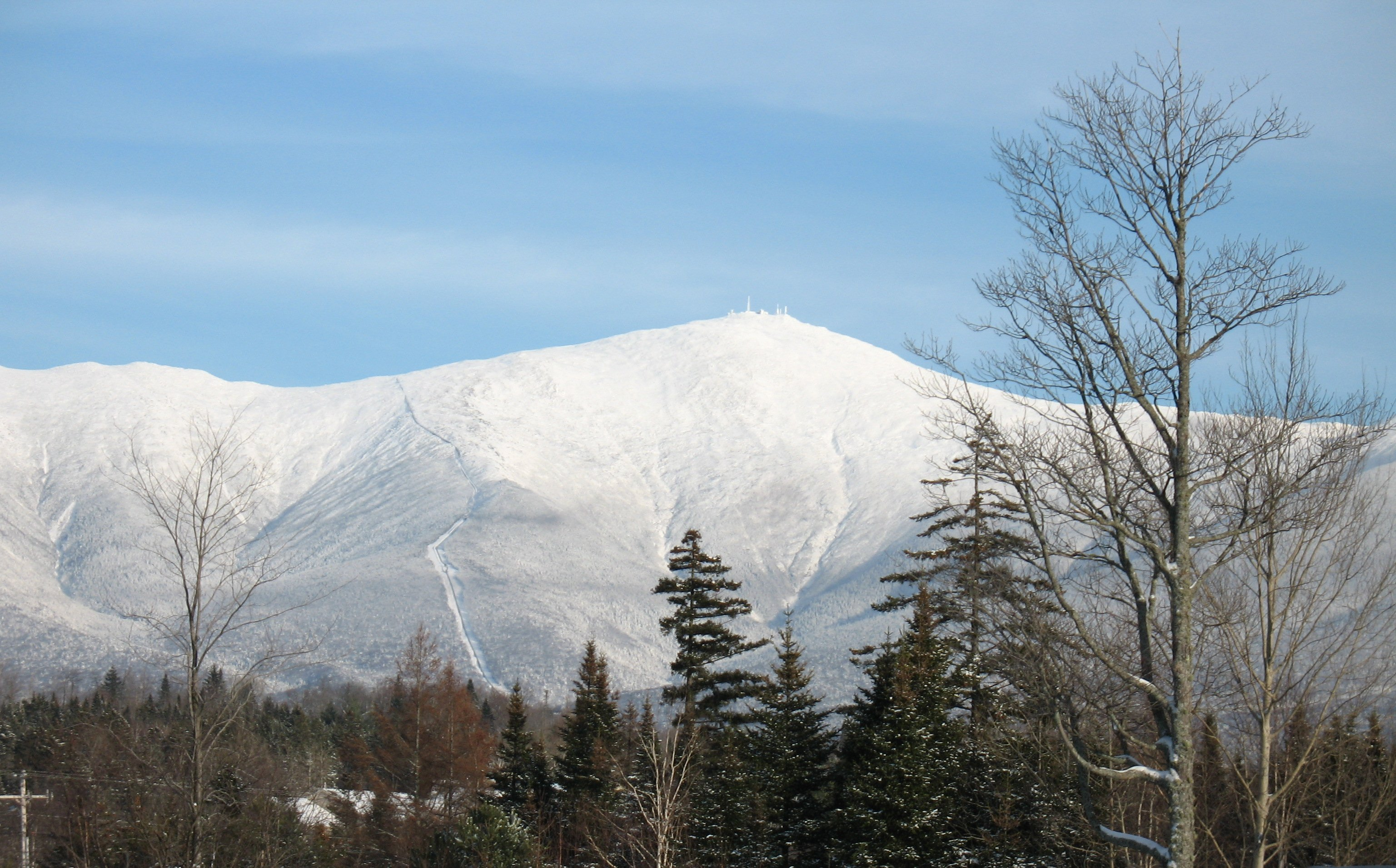
Mount Washington

- Mount Adams
- Mount Clay
- Mount Chocorua
- Mount Eisenhower
- Mount Jefferson
- Mount Lafayette
- Mount Madison
- Mount Monadnock
- Mount Monroe
- Mount Moosilauke
- Mount Sunapee
- **Mount Washington**, highest summit of the White Mountains, the State of New Hampshire, and the northeastern United States

=== New Jersey ===
- **High Point**, highest summit of the Kittatinny Mountains and the State of New Jersey
- Kikeout Mountain
- Pohatcong Mountain
- Mount Tammany
- Windbeam Mountain
- Ramapo Mountains

=== New Mexico ===
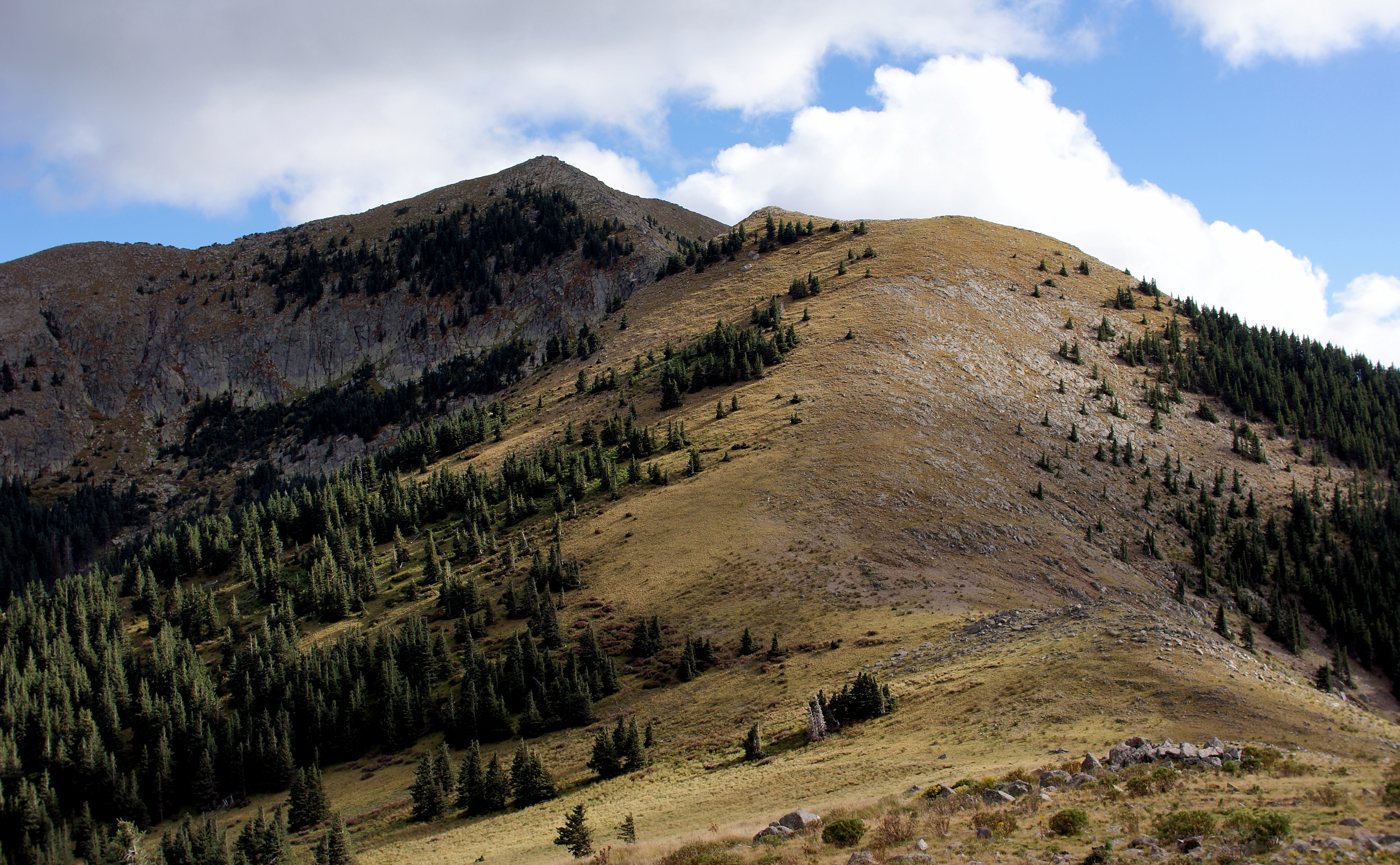
Sierra Blanca Peak

- Baldy Mountain, highest summit of the Cimarron Range
- Bennett Peak
- Big Hatchet Peak
- Carrizo Peak
- Gold Hill
- Lake Fork Peak
- Laughlin Peak
- Mount Phillips
- Pueblo Peak
- San Antonio Mountain
- Sandia Crest
- Santa Fe Baldy
- Sierra Blanca Peak, highest summit of the Sacramento Mountains
- Mount Taylor
- Truchas Peak, highest summit of the Santa Fe Mountains
- Ute Mountain
- Vallecito Mountain
- Venado Peak
- Mount Walter
- **Wheeler Peak**, highest summit of the Taos Mountains and the State of New Mexico, and the southernmost 4000 meter peak of the Rocky Mountains
- Whitewater Baldy, highest summit of the Mogollon Mountains
- Zeller Peak

=== New York ===
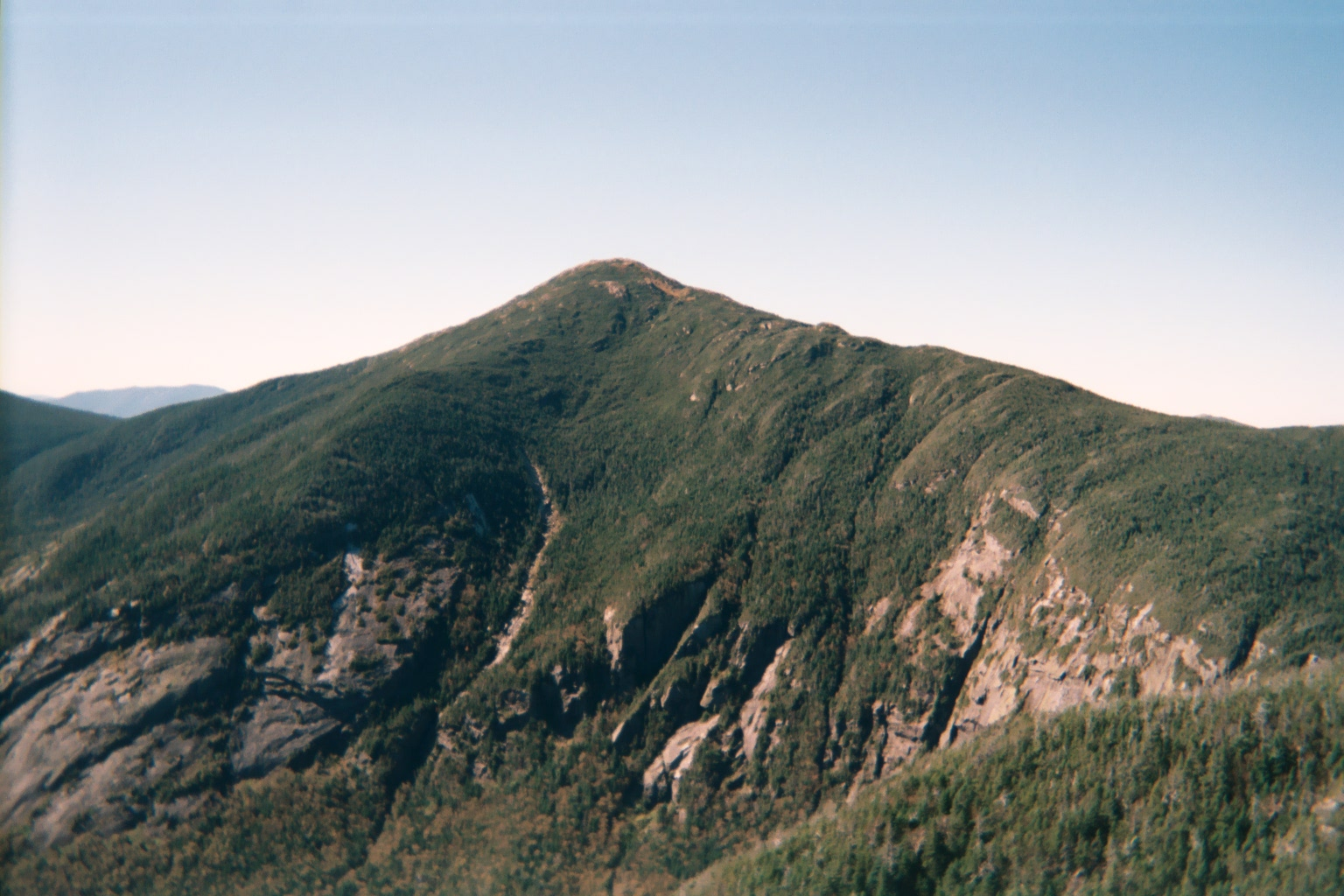
Mount Marcy

- Algonquin Peak
- Anthony's Nose
- Beacon Mountain
- Bear Mountain
- Breakneck Ridge
- Bull Hill
- Cascade Mountain
- Dix Mountain
- Hunter Mountain
- Kaaterskill High Peak
- Mount Adams
- Mount Colden
- Mount Colvin
- Mount Haystack
- Mount Jefferson
- **Mount Marcy**, highest summit of the Adirondack Mountains and the State of New York
- Mount Skylight
- North Mountain
- Porter Mountain
- Schunemunk Mountain
- Slide Mountain, highest summit of the Catskill Mountains
- Storm King Mountain
- Todt Hill, summit of Staten Island
- Whiteface Mountain
- Windham Mountain
- Wright Peak
- Giant Mountain

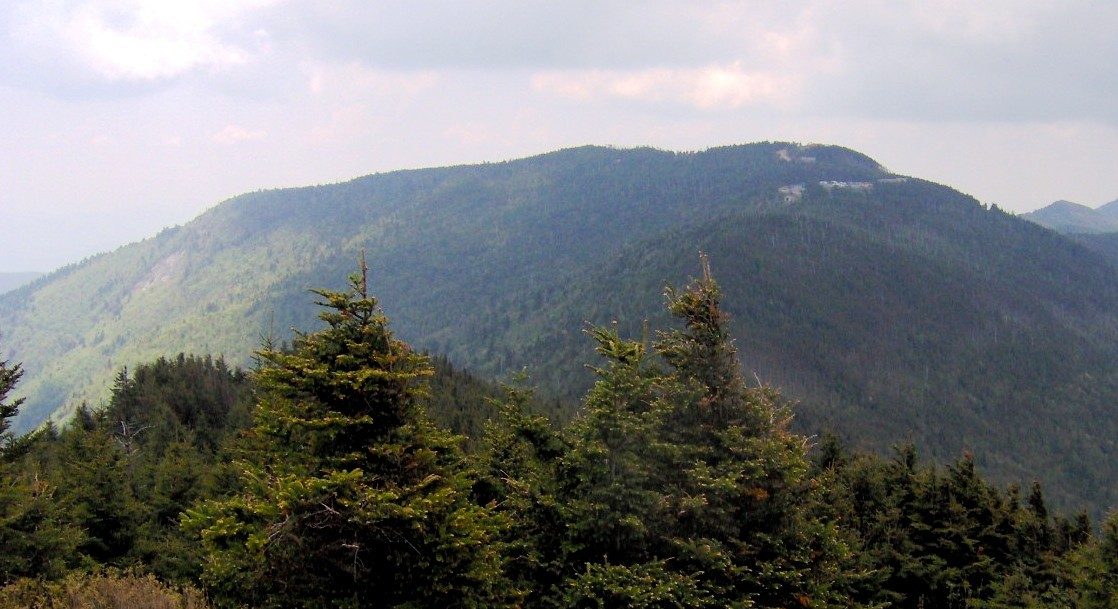
Mount Mitchell

=== North Carolina ===
- Bee Mountain
- Beech Mountain
- Big Butt Mountain
- Big Yellow Mountain
- Black Mountains
- Blue Ridge Mountains
- Brushy Mountains
- Kuwohi
- Crowders Mountain
- Grandfather Mountain
- Grandmother Mountain
- Great Smoky Mountains
- Hanging Rock
- Hanging Rock State Park
- Hibriten Mountain
- King's Pinnacle
- Little Yellow Mountain
- Morrow Mountain
- Mount Jefferson
- **Mount Mitchell**, highest summit of the Appalachian Mountains, the State of North Carolina, and the eastern United States
- Occoneechee Mountain
- Old Butt Knob
- Peak Mountain
- Pilot Mountain
- Pixie Mountain
- Saura Mountains
- Stone Mountain
- Sugar Mountain
- Three Top Mountain
- Uwharrie Mountains
- Whiteside Mountain
- Woody's Knob

=== North Dakota ===
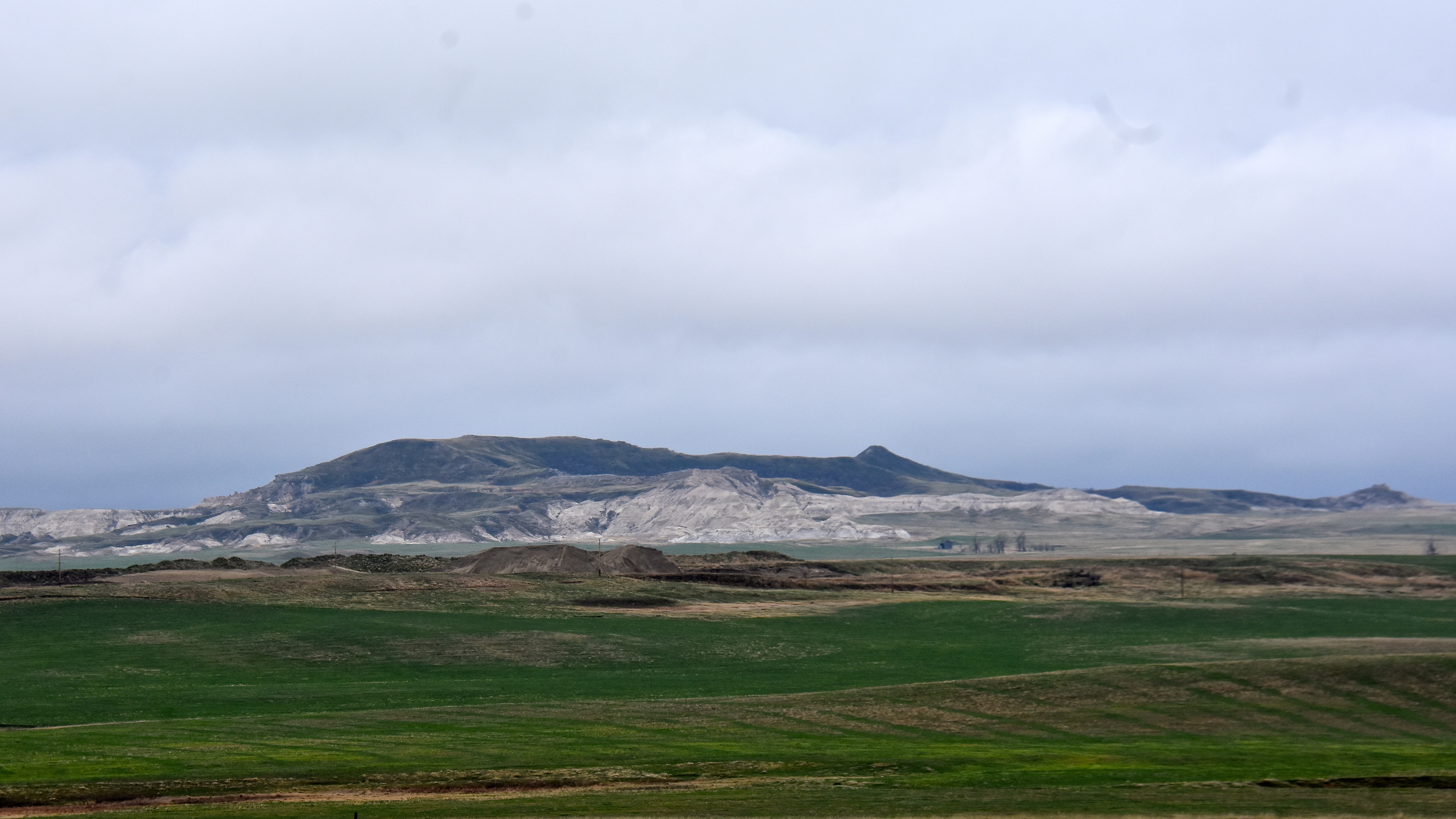
White Butte

- **White Butte**, highest summit of the State of North Dakota

=== Northern Mariana Islands ===
- **Agrihan** — an unnamed point on the Island of Agrihan is the highest summit of the Commonwealth of the Northern Mariana Islands
- North Pagan, summit of Pagan Island

=== Ohio ===
- **Campbell Hill**, highest summit of the State of Ohio
- Behm Mountain | Adams | OH
- Black Mountain | Pickaway I OH
- Chestnuts Mountain | Pike | OH
- Daniels Mountain | Lake | OH
- Gildersleeve Mountain | Lake | OH
- Irons Mountain | Highland | OH
- Little Copperas Mountain | Ross | OH
- Little Mountain | Geauga | OH
- Maggies Mountain | Harrison | OH
- Matties Mountain | Harrison | OH
- Palmer Mountain | Pike | OH
- Palmers Mountain | Highland | OH
- Peach Mountain | Adams | OH
- Renoes Mountain | Pike | OH
- Rileys Mountain | Pike | OH
- Shepherds Mountain | Pike | OH
- Star Mountain | Pike | OH
- Tener Mountain | Adams | OH
- Wills Mountain | Harrison | OH

=== Oklahoma ===
- Big Mountain (Oklahoma)
- **Black Mesa (Oklahoma, Colorado, New Mexico)**, the highest summit in Oklahoma
- Cavanal Hill
- Mount Pinchot (Oklahoma)
- Rich Mountain (Arkansas–Oklahoma)
- Mount Scott (Oklahoma)
- Sugar Loaf Mountain (Oklahoma)
- Wilton Mountain

=== Oregon ===
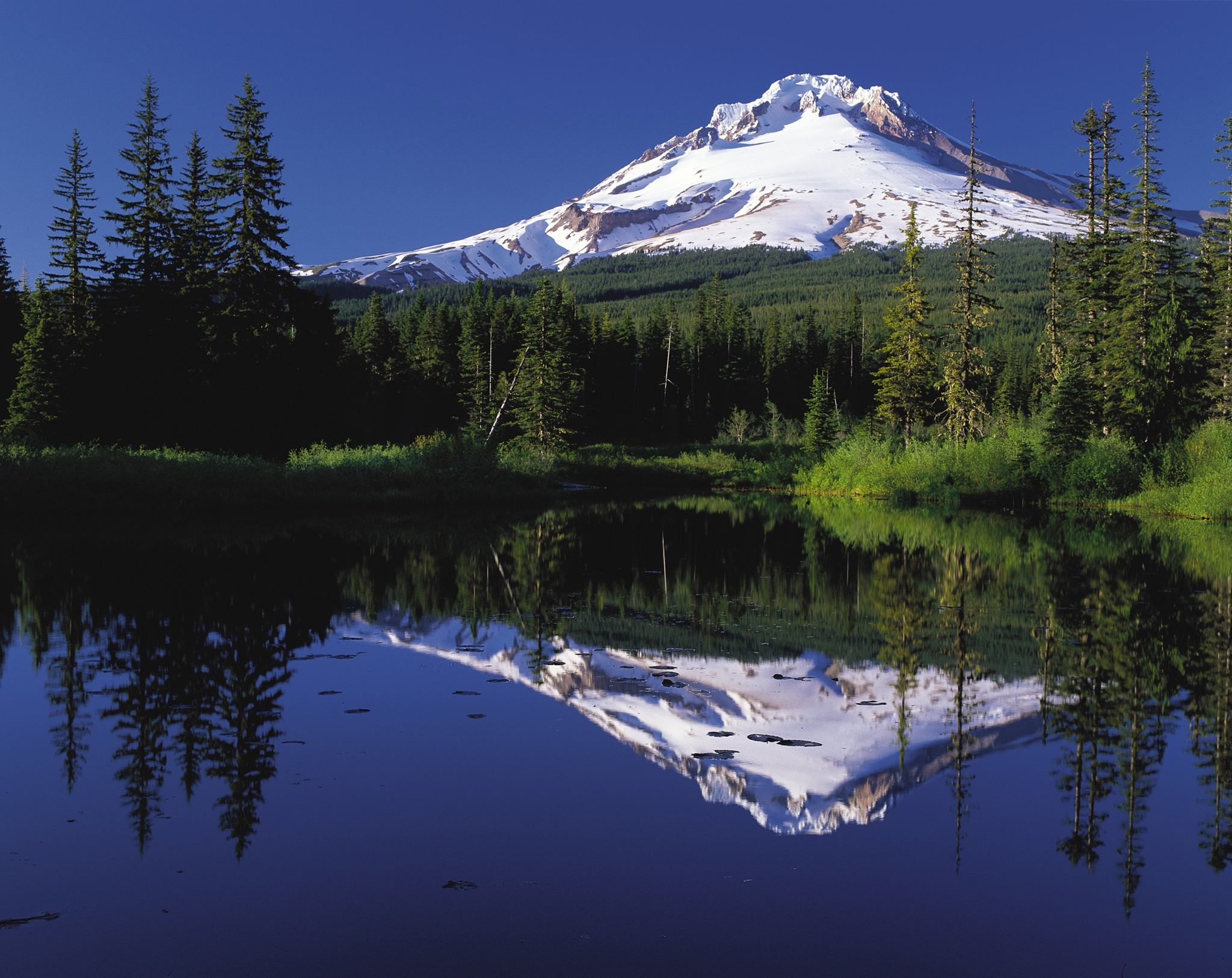
Mount Hood

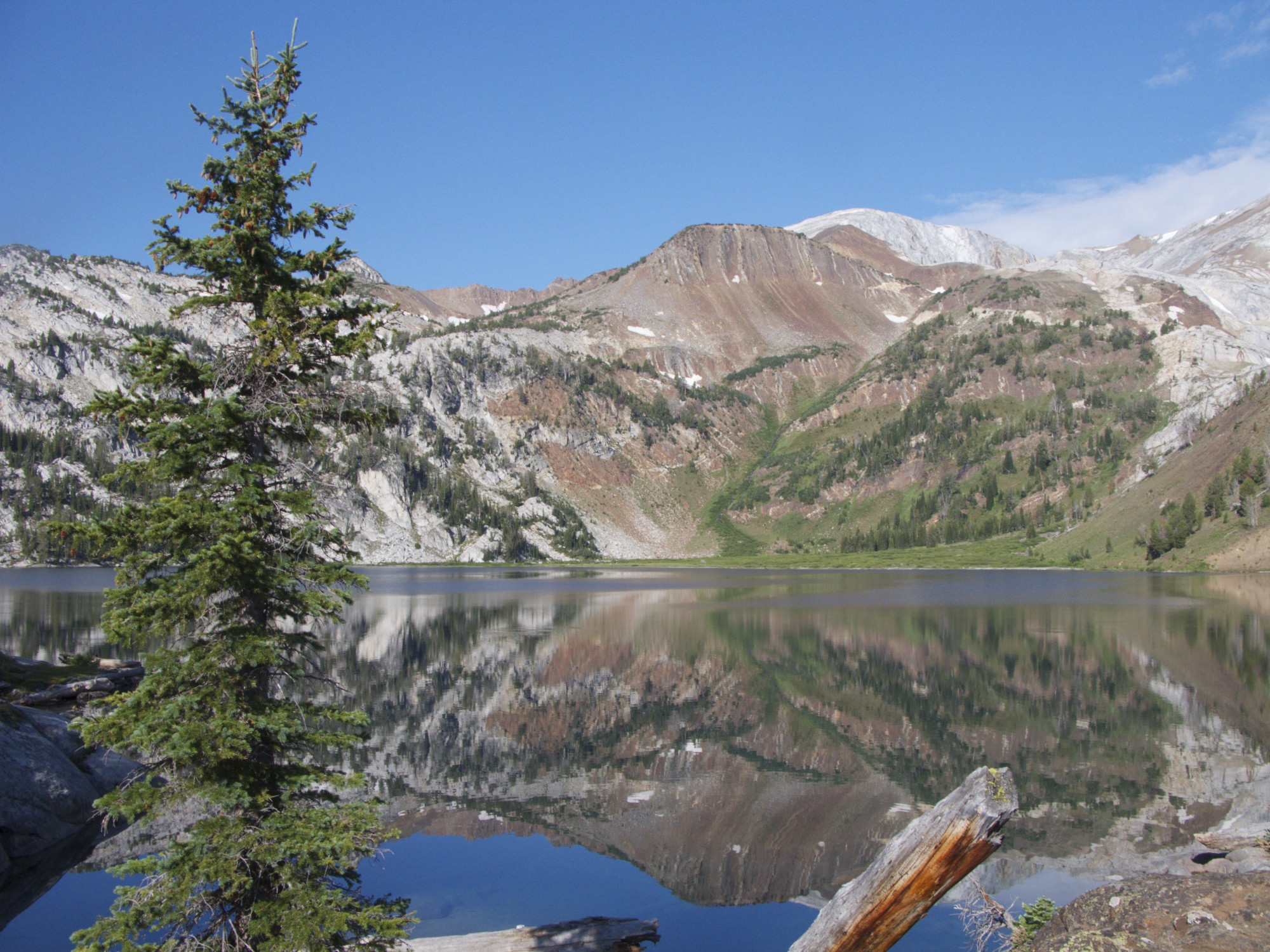
Sacajawea Peak

- Applegate Peak, an andesitic volcanic peak on Crater Lake
- Boccard Point
- Bonneville Mountain
- Chief Joseph Mountain
- Cornucopia Peak
- Craig Mountain
- Crane Mountain
- Cusick Mountain
- Glacier Peak
- Grizzly Mountain
- Hillman Peak, a stratovolcano and subvent volcano of Mount Mazama
- Hogback Mountain (Klamath County)
- Hood River Mountain, Hood River County, Columbia Gorge
- Keel Mountain
- Krag Peak
- Llao Rock, a lava flow and shield volcano on Crater Lake
- Marys Peak
- Matterhorn
- Mount Bachelor, stratovolcano
- Mount Bailey, shield volcano
- Mount Bolivar, highest summit of the Oregon Coast Range
- Mount Chinidere, Cascade Range
- Mount Defiance, in the Columbia Gorge, Cascade Range, an old shield volcano
- **Mount Hood**, active stratovolcano that is the highest summit of the state of Oregon
- Mount Howard
- Mount Jefferson, stratovolcano
- Mount Mazama, a collapsed stratovolcano with a crater lake, named Crater Lake
- Mount McLoughlin, stratovolcano and lava cone
- Mount Mitchell
- Mount Tabor (Oregon), an extinct volcanic cinder cone
- Mount Thielsen, an extinct shield volcano
- Mount Washington, shield volcano
- Needle Point
- Newberry Volcano, shield volcano
- Pine Mountain, a pyroclastic cone with a space observatory
- Pueblo Mountain, highest in the Pueblo Mountains, a volcanically formed range
- Rogers Peak
- Sacajawea Peak, highest in the Wallowa Mountains
- Sawtooth Peak
- Shellrock Mountain Cascade Range
- South Sister, one of the three stratovolcanoes (is a stratovolcano itself) and shield volcano, and third-highest peak in Oregon
- Steens Mountain, an old shield volcano
- Three Fingered Jack, shield volcano
- Three Sisters
- Tomlike Mountain Cascade Range
- Underwood Mountain Cascade Range
- Wind Mountain Cascade Range

=== Pennsylvania ===
- Mount Ararat
- Bald Eagle Mountain
- Big Mountain
- Blue Knob
- Brush Mountain
- Butler Knob
- Camelback Mountain (Big Pocono)
- Hawk Mountain
- Martin Hill
- Miller Mountain
- **Mount Davis**, highest summit of the Commonwealth of Pennsylvania
- Nittany Mountain
- Pine Knob
- Schaefer Head
- Sideling Hill
- South Mountain
- Tuscarora Mountain
- Tussey Mountain
- Wills Mountain

=== Puerto Rico ===
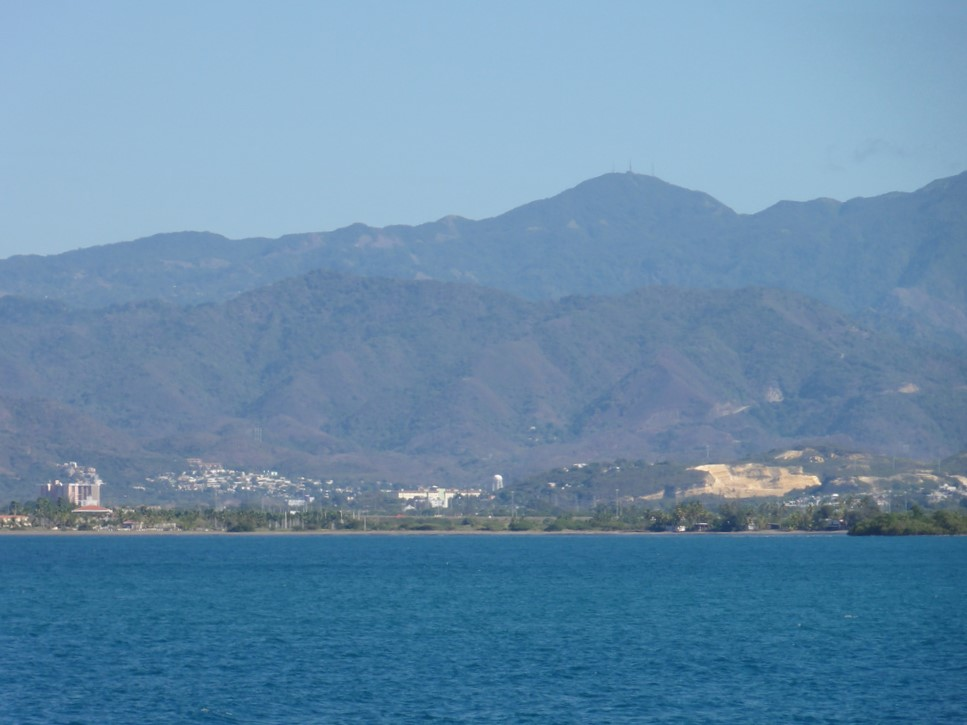
Cerro de Punta

- **Cerro de Punta**, the highest summit in Puerto Rico
- Cerro Doña Juana
- Cerro El Bolo
- Cerro Las Tetas
- Cerro Maravilla
- Cerro Rosa
- El Yunque
- Monte Guilarte
- Monte Jayuya
- Tres Picachos

=== South Carolina ===
- **Sassafras Mountain**, highest summit of the State of South Carolina

=== South Dakota ===
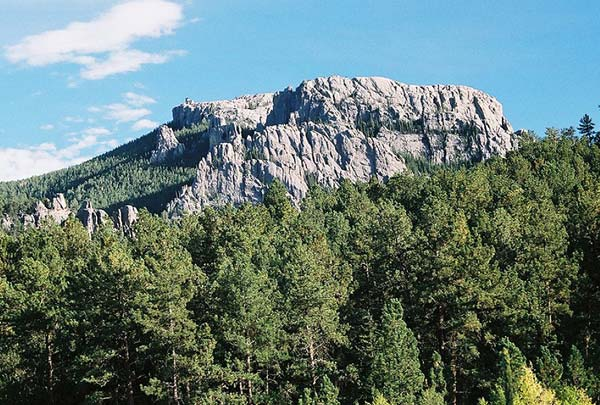
Black Elk Peak

- **Black Elk Peak**, highest summit of the Black Hills and the State of South Dakota and the easternmost 2200 meter peak of the United States
- Bear Mountain

=== Tennessee ===
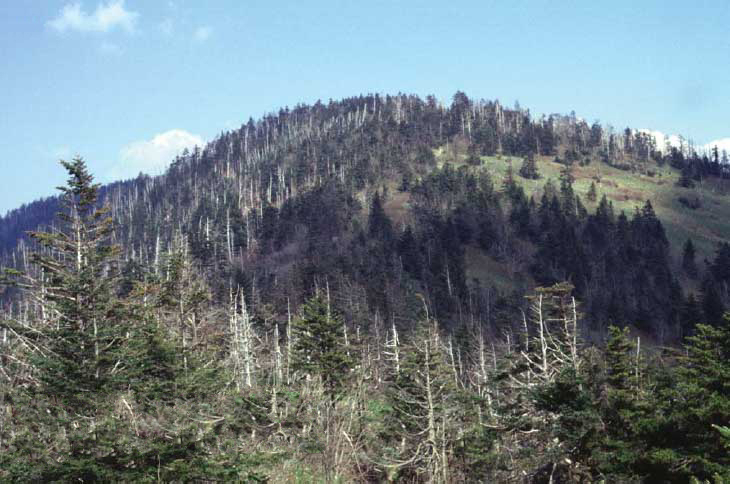
Kuwohi

- Bays Mountain
- Big Frog Mountain
- Blue Ridge Mountains
- Chilhowee Mountain
- Clinch Mountain
- Coon Butt
- Cumberland Plateau
- Frozen Head
- Gregory Bald
- Harris Mountain
- Highland Rim
- Holston Mountain
- **Kuwohi**, highest summit of the Great Smoky Mountains and the State of Tennessee
- Lookout Mountain
- Little Mountain
- Mount Chapman
- Mount Collins
- Mount Evil
- Mount Guyot
- Mount Kephart
- Mount Le Conte
- Mount Sequoyah
- Pilot Knob
- Roan High Knob
- Short Mountain
- Silers Bald
- Smoky Mountains
- Spence Field
- Tricorner Knob

=== Texas ===
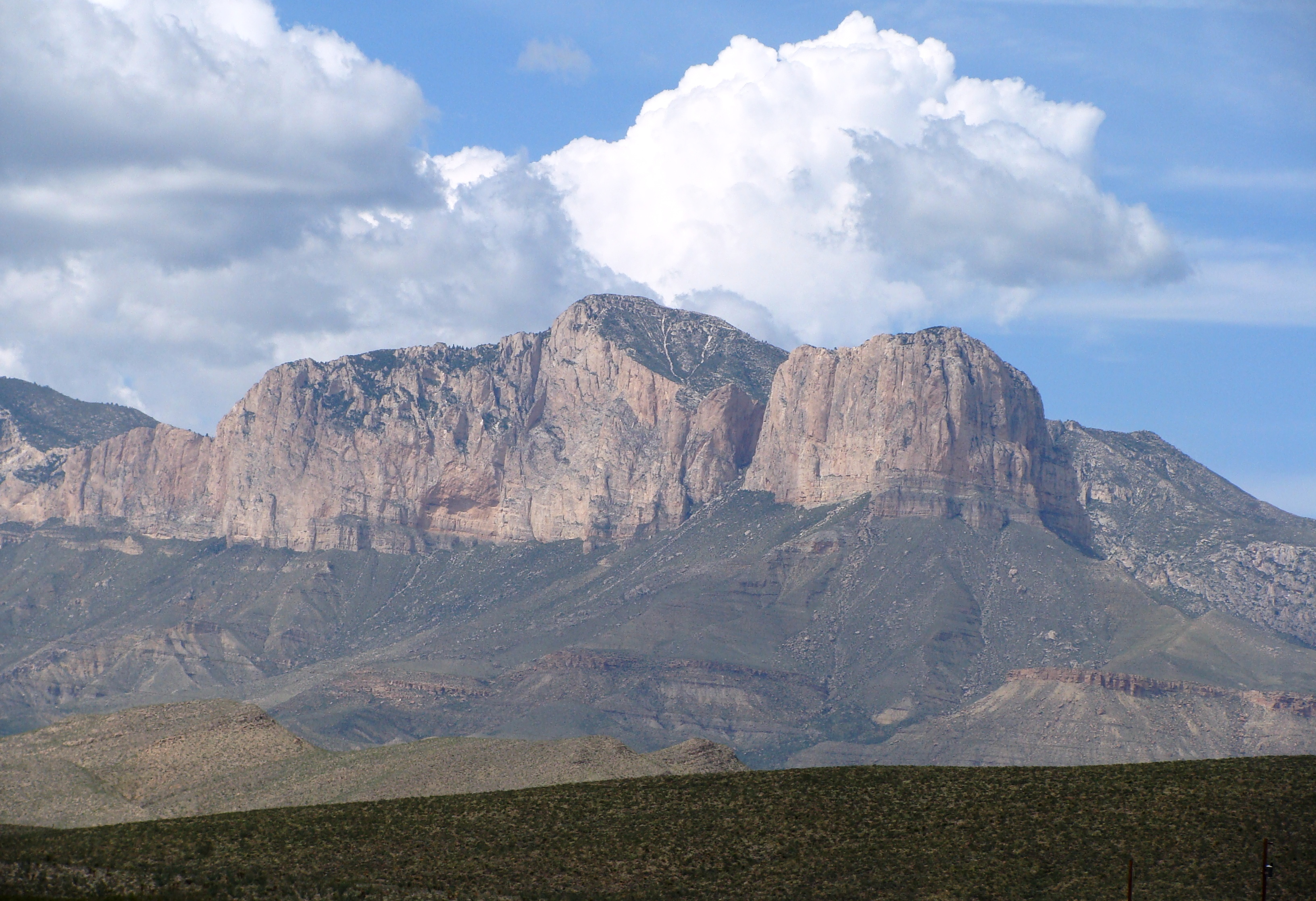
Guadalupe Peak

- Baldy Peak
- Bartlett Peak
- Bee Mountain
- Black Mountain
- Burro Mesa
- Carter Peak
- Casa Grande Peak
- Cerro Alto Mountain
- Cerro Castellan
- Cerro de las Burras
- Crown Mountain
- El Capitan
- Elephant Tusk
- Emory Peak, highest summit of the Chisos Mountains
- Enchanted Rock
- Goat Mountain
- **Guadalupe Peak**, highest summit of the Guadalupe Mountains and the State of Texas
- Hairy Knob
- Hunter Peak
- Kit Mountain
- Little Christmas Mountain
- Lost Mine Peak
- Mount Huffman
- Mule Ear Peaks
- Needle Peak
- North Franklin Mountain
- Nugent Mountain
- Packsaddle Mountain (Brewster County)
- Packsaddle Mountain (Llano County)
- Panther Peak
- Pummel Peak
- Santiago Peak
- Shumard Peak
- Sierra Blanca
- Tackett Mountain
- Three Dike Hill
- Toll Mountain
- Townsend Point
- Trap Mountain
- Tule Mountain
- Vernon Bailey Peak
- Ward Mountain
- Willow Mountain
- Wright Mountain

=== Utah ===
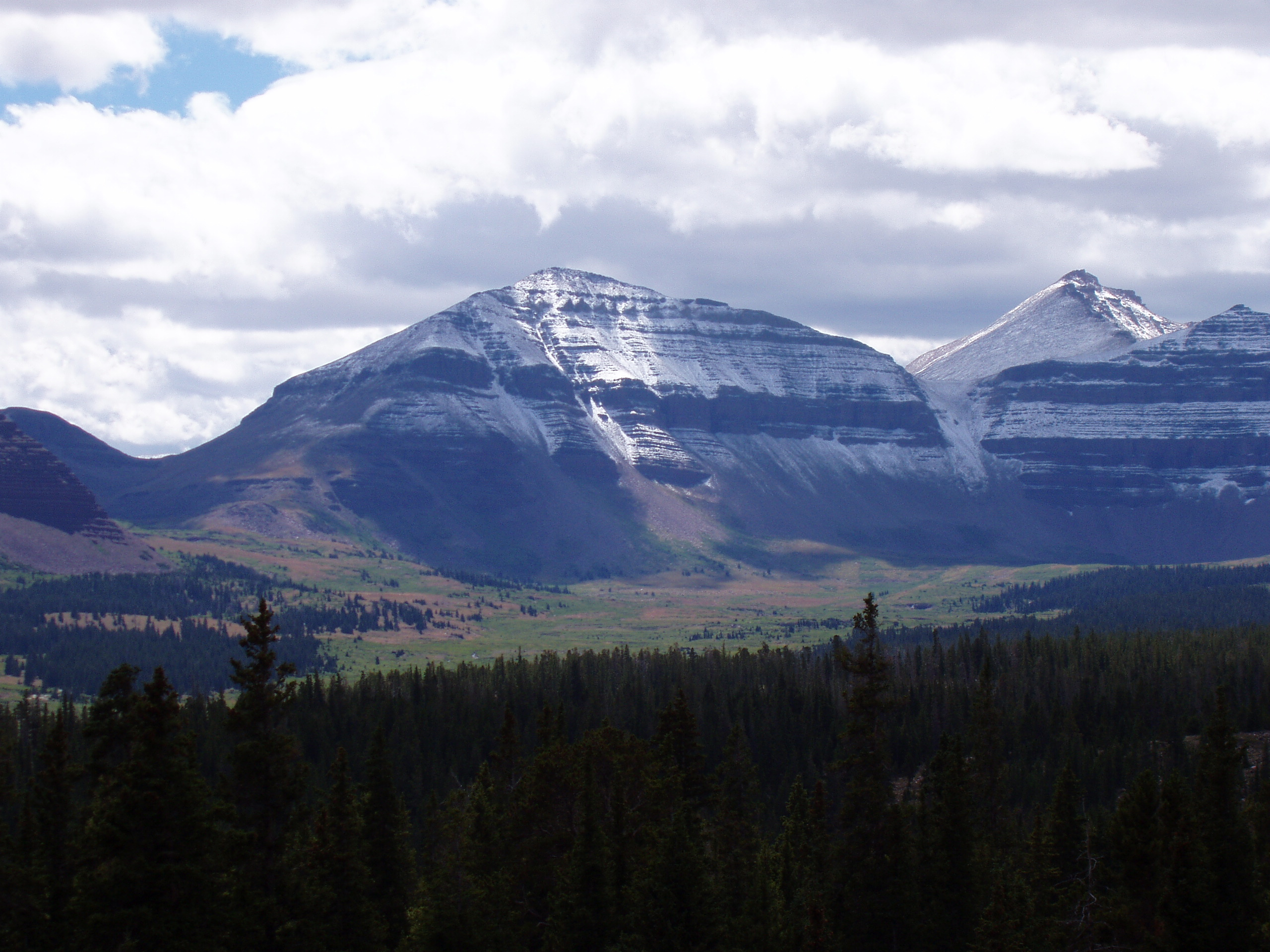
Kings Peak

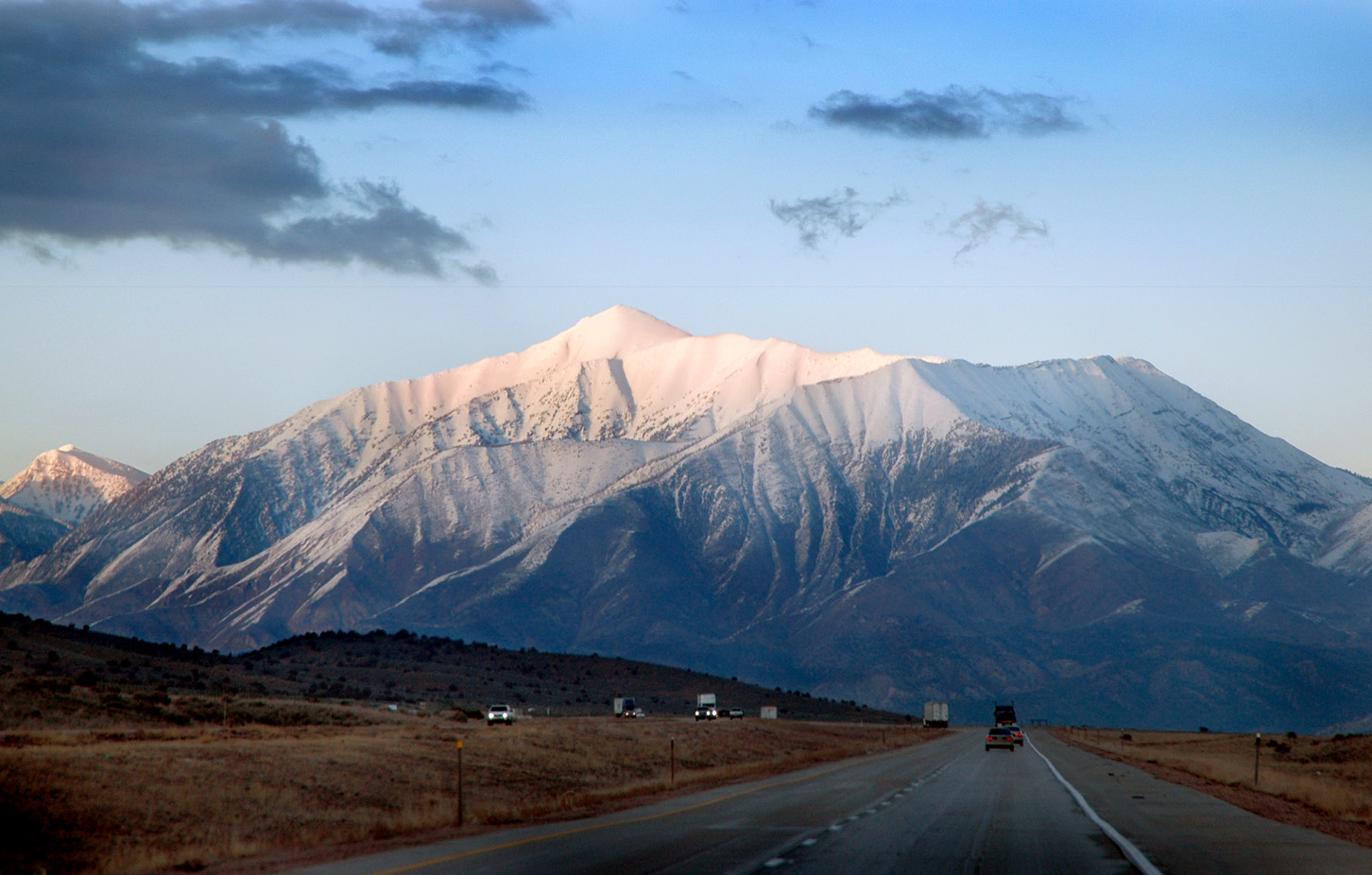
Mount Nebo

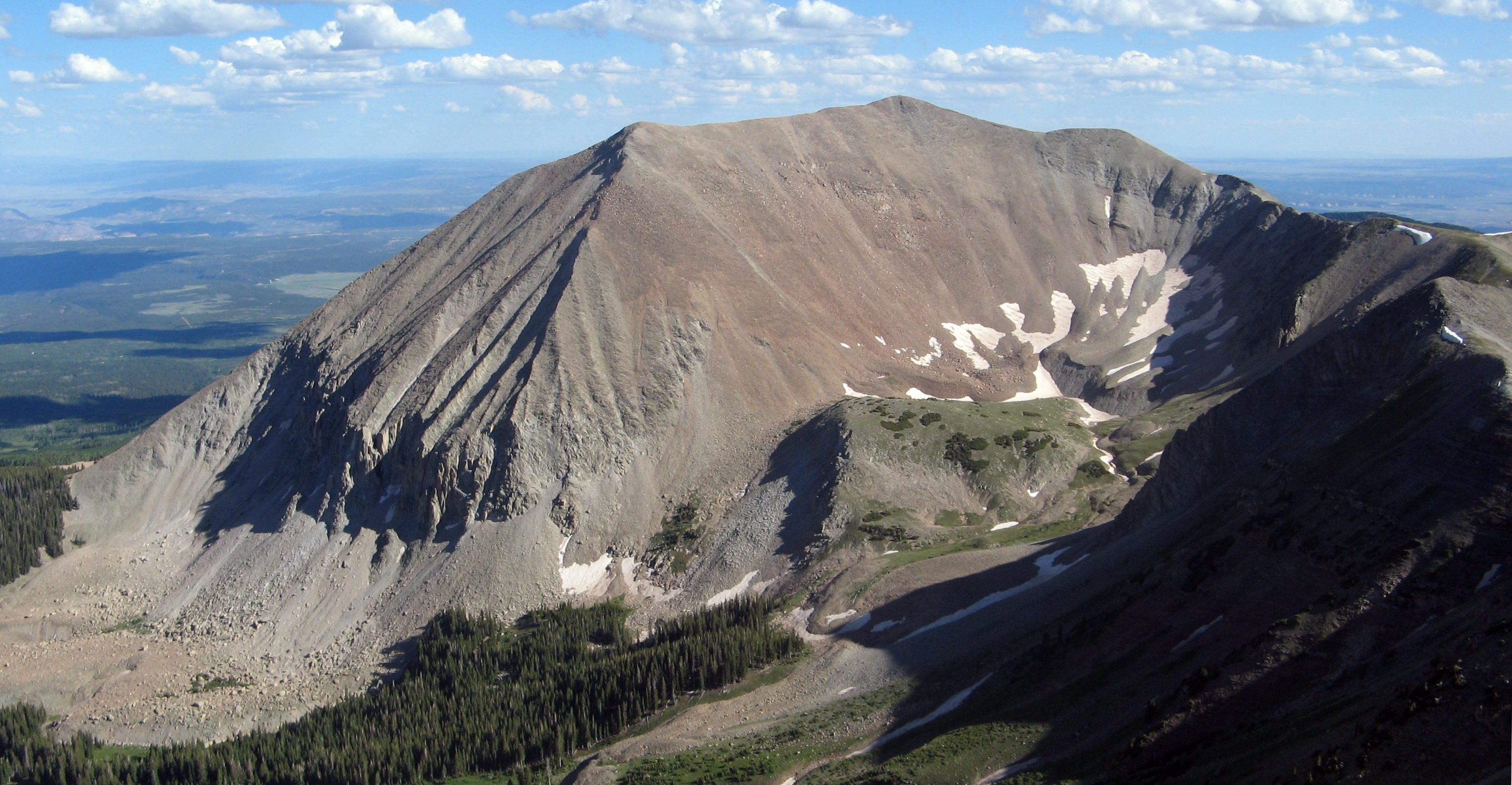
Mount Peale

- Abajo Peak
- Abraham Peak
- Adobe Mesa
- Aires Butte
- Altar of Sacrifice
- Ant Hill
- Assembly Hall Peak
- Bald Mountain
- Battleship Butte
- Beatty Point
- Bee Hive (peak)
- Ben Lomond Mountain (Utah)
- Boulder Mountain
- Bountiful Peak
- Box Elder Peak
- Brian Head
- Bridge Mountain
- Brighams Tomb
- Broken Tooth
- Bull Mountain
- The Castle
- Castle Dome
- Cathedral Mountain (Capitol Reef National Park)
- Cathedral Mountain (Zion National Park)
- Cathedral, The
- Checkerboard Mesa
- Clayton Peak
- Cobb Peak
- Crazy Quilt Mesa
- Dead Horse Peak
- Deer Trail Mountain
- Deertrap Mountain
- Delano Peak
- Deseret Peak
- Dromedary Peak
- Dunn Benchmark
- Eagle Crags
- Eagle Mesa
- The East Temple
- Explorer Peak
- Ferns Nipple
- Flat Top Mountain
- Gilbert Peak
- Gobblers Knob
- Graham Peak
- Grandeur Peak
- Grandview Peak
- Greatheart Mesa
- Gunnison Butte
- Hayden Peak
- Haystack Peak
- Henrys Fork Peak
- Hilgard Mountain
- Ibapah Peak
- Inclined Temple
- Isaac Peak
- Ivins Mountain
- Jacob Peak
- Jenkins Peak
- Johnson Mountain
- Kelsey Peak
- Kesler Peak
- **Kings Peak**, highest summit of the Uinta Mountains, the Western Rocky Mountains, and the State of Utah
- Kweeyahgut Peak
- Lady Mountain
- Logan Peak
- Lowe Peak
- Mahogany Mountain
- Meridian Tower
- Mountain of Mystery
- Mountain of the Sun
- Mount Aire
- Mount Baldy
- Mount Belknap
- Mount Beulah
- Mount Brigham
- Mount Ellen
- Mount Ellsworth
- Mount Hillers
- Mount Majestic
- Mount Marsell
- Mount Mellenthin
- Mount Millicent
- Mount Moroni
- Mount Nebo, highest summit of the Wasatch Mountains
- Mount Ogden
- Mount Olympus
- Mount Peale, highest summit of the La Sal Mountains
- Mount Pennell
- Mount Raymond
- Mount Spry
- Mount Timpanogos
- Mount Tukuhnikivatz
- Mount Waas
- Mount Watson
- Mount Wolverine
- Muffin Butte
- Nagunt Mesa
- Naomi Peak, highest summit of the Bear River Mountains
- Navajo Mountain
- Nelson Peak
- Nippletop
- Northgate Peaks
- North Guardian Angel
- Notch Mountain
- Observation Point
- Ostler Peak
- O'Sullivan Peak
- Pine Valley Peak
- Provo Peak
- Red Arch Mountain
- Red Castle
- Reids Peak
- Rishel Peak
- Rotten Tooth
- Salt Benchmark, highest summit of the San Pitch Mountains
- Sawtooth Mountain
- The Sentinel
- Sentinel Mesa
- Shunesburg Mountain
- Signal Peak (Utah)
- Smithsonian Butte
- S.O.B. Hill
- South Guardian Angel
- South Tent Mountain
- Spanish Fork Peak
- Split Mountain
- Strawberry Peak, highest summit of the Roan Cliffs
- Sugarloaf Mountain
- The Sundial
- Sunset Peak
- Swasey Peak
- Tabernacle Dome
- Temple Mountain
- Tetzlaff Peak
- Thousand Lake Mountain
- Timber Top Mountain
- Twin Brothers
- Twin Peaks
  - American Fork Twin Peaks
  - Broads Fork Twin Peaks
  - Avenues Twin Peaks
- Volcano Peak
- Wasatch Peak
- The Watchman
- The West Temple
- Willard Peak
- Window Blind Peak
- Wire Mountain
- The Witch Head
- Yard Peak

=== Vermont ===
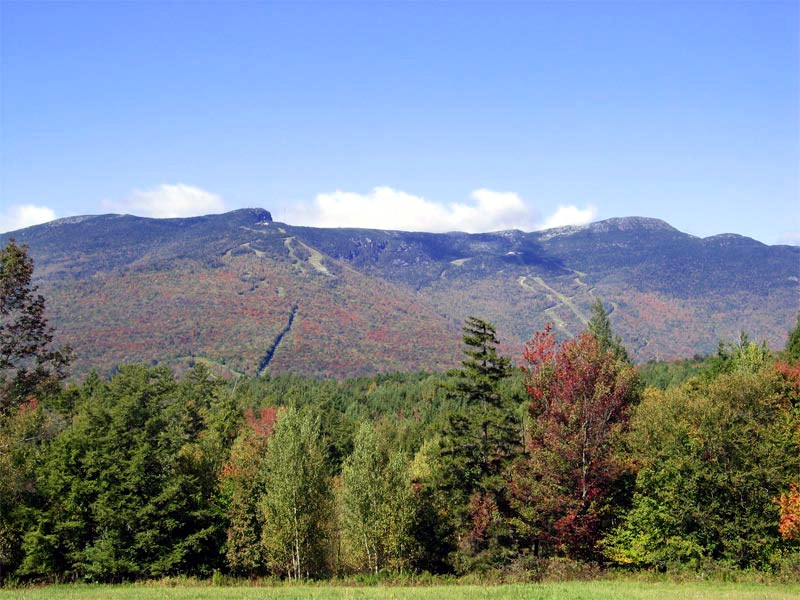
Mount Mansfield

- Burke Mountain
- Big Jay
- Bread Loaf Mountain
- Camel's Hump
- Dorset Mountain
- Equinox Mountain
- Haystack Mountain
- Jay Peak
- Killington Peak
- Mount Abraham
- Mount Ascutney
- Mount Ellen
- **Mount Mansfield**, highest summit of the Green Mountains and the State of Vermont
- Mount Hor
- Mount Pisgah
- Mount Snow
- Stratton Mountain

=== Virgin Islands (U.S.) ===
- Bordeaux Mountain, summit of the Island of Saint John
- Crown Mountain, summit of the Island of Saint Thomas and the highest summit of the United States Virgin Islands
- Mount Eagle, summit of the Island of Saint Croix

=== Virginia ===
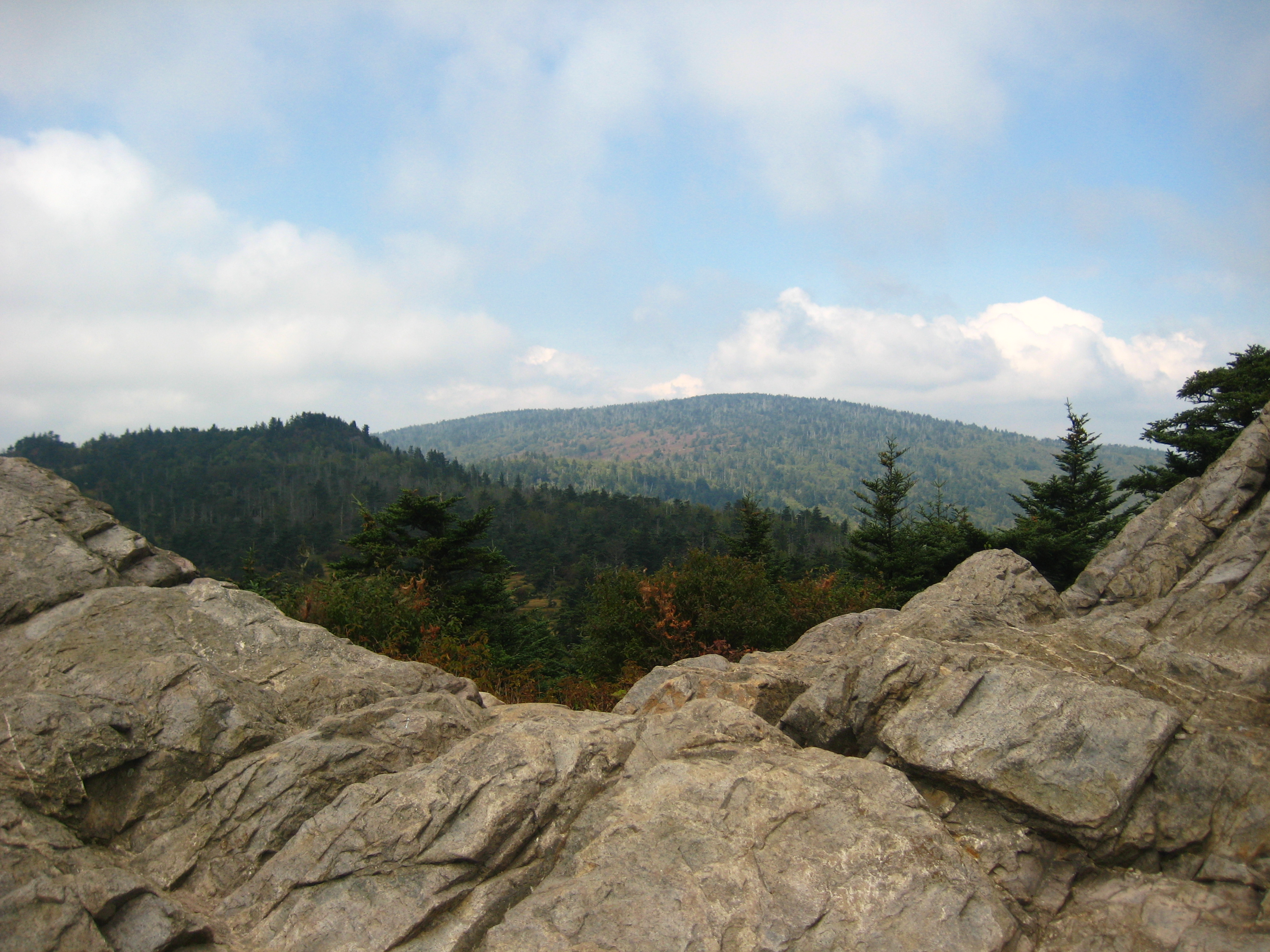
Mount Rogers

- Apple Orchard Mountain
- Bald Knob
- Balsam Beartown Mountain
- Beartown Mountain
- Bull Run Mountain
- Catoctin Mountain
- Clinch Mountain
- Elliott Knob
- Great North Mountain
- Hawksbill Mountain
- High Knob
- Massanutten Mountain
- Mount Jefferson
- **Mount Rogers**, highest summit of the Commonwealth of Virginia
- North Mountain
- Old Rag Mountain
- Peaks of Otter
- Powell Mountain
- Short Hill Mountain
- Reddish Knob
- Whitetop Mountain

=== Washington ===
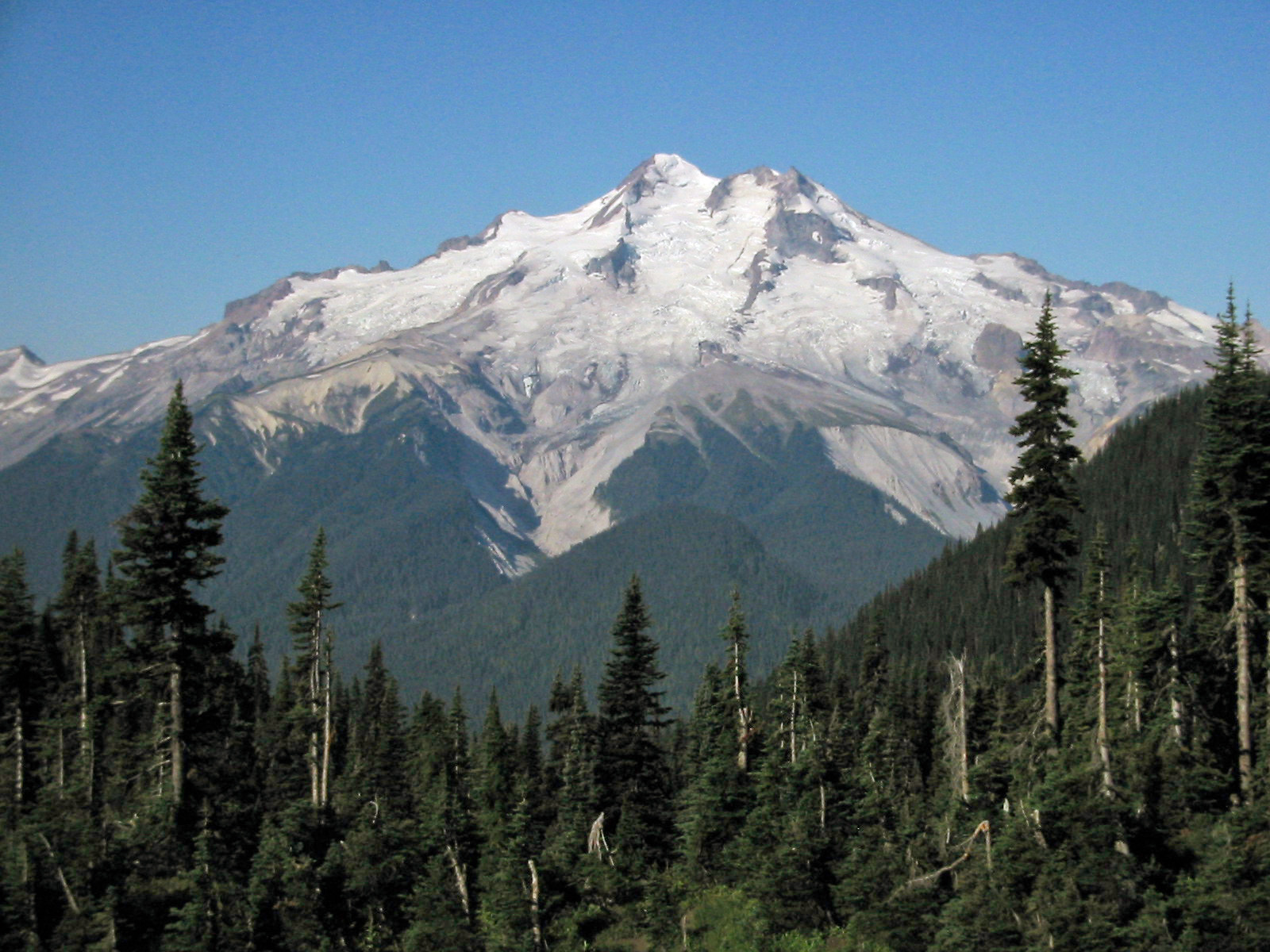
Glacier Peak

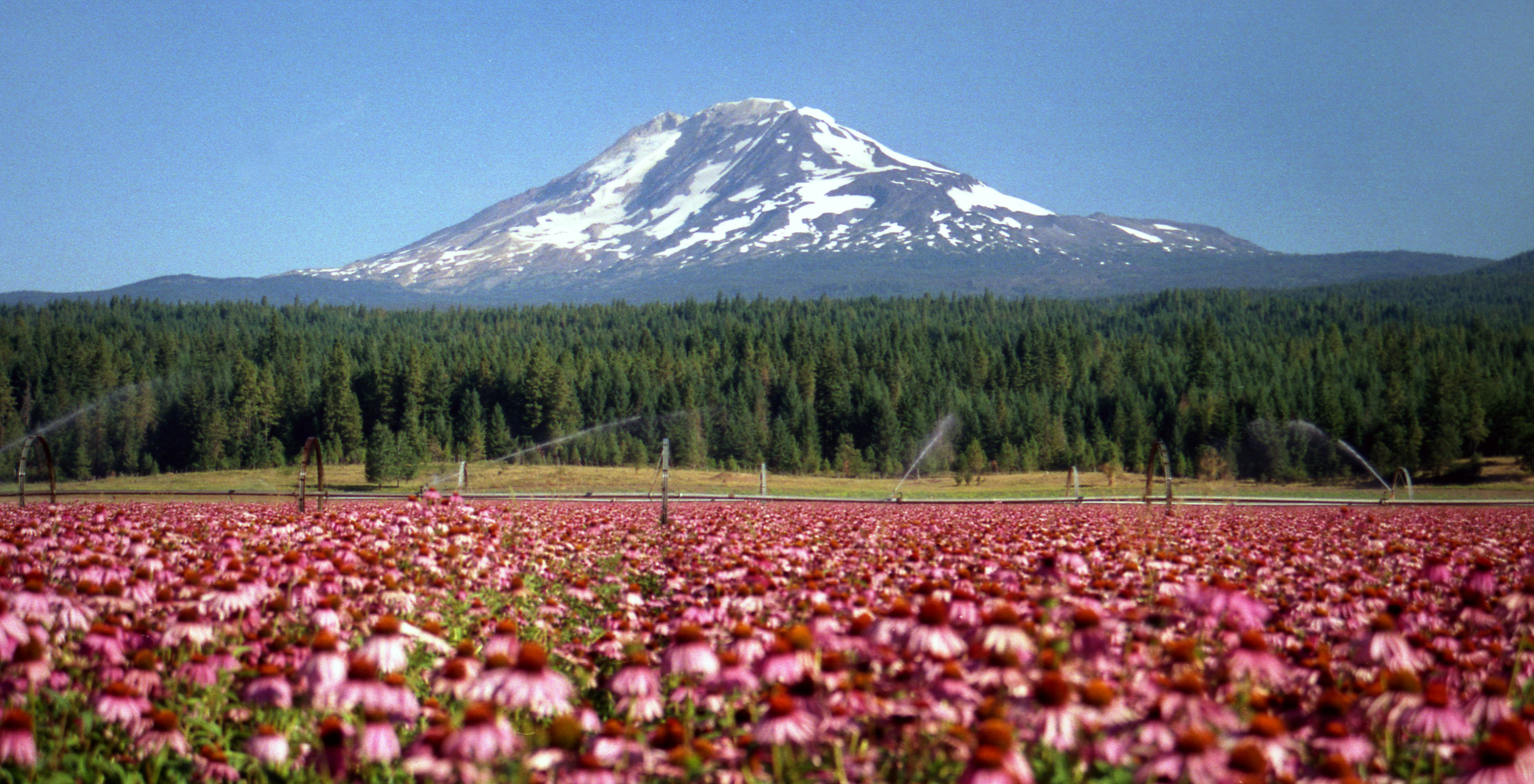
Mount Adams

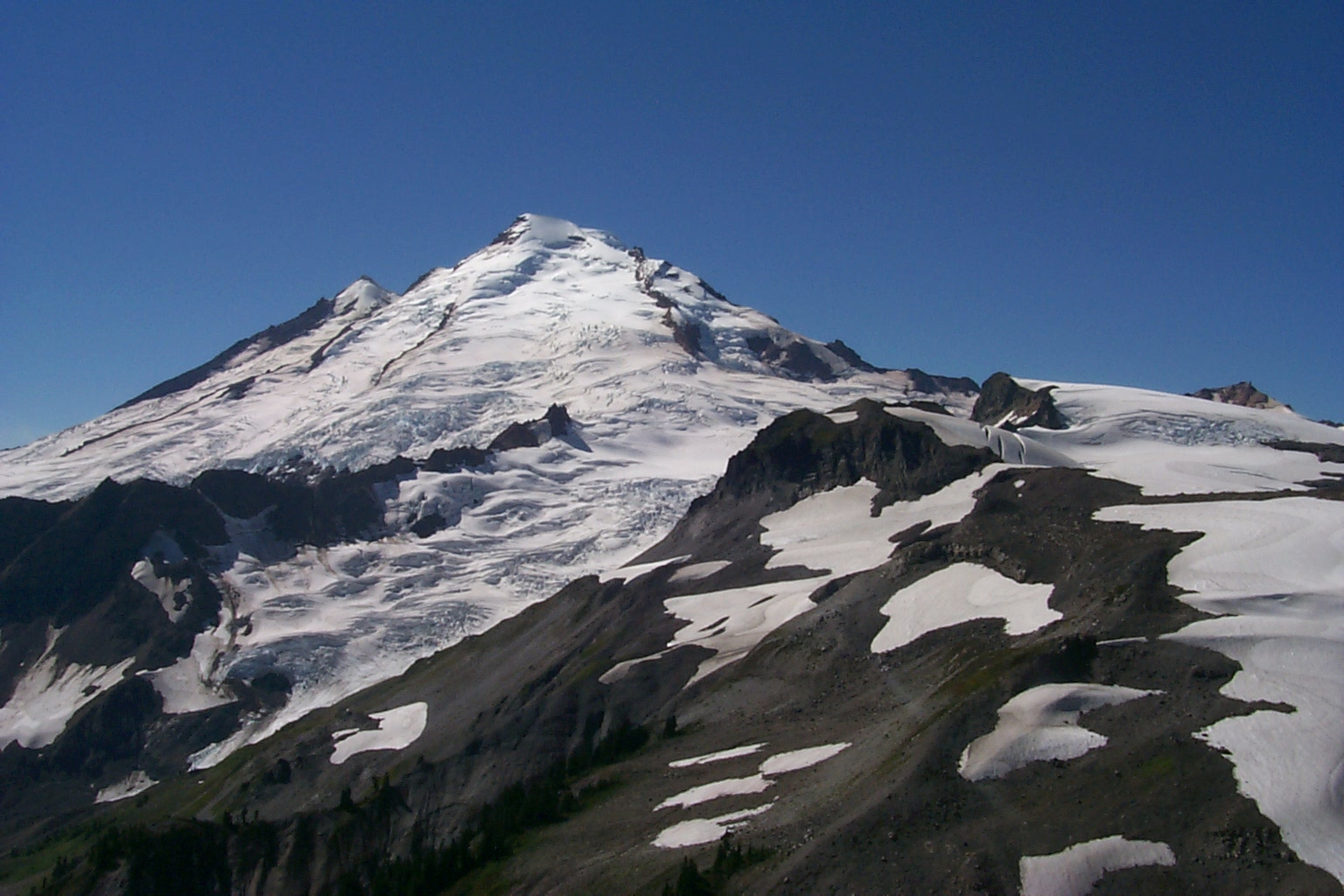
Mount Baker

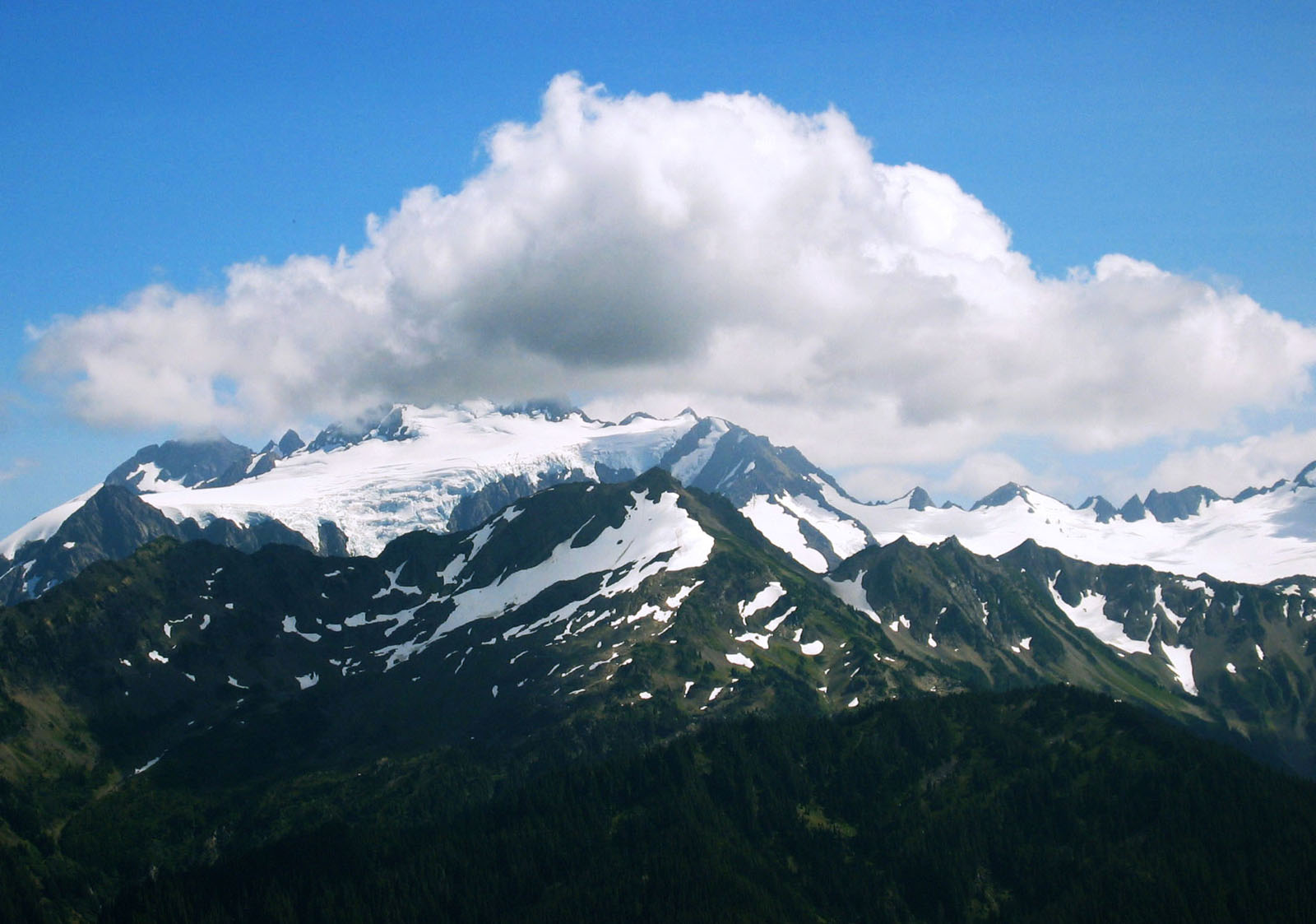
Mount Olympus

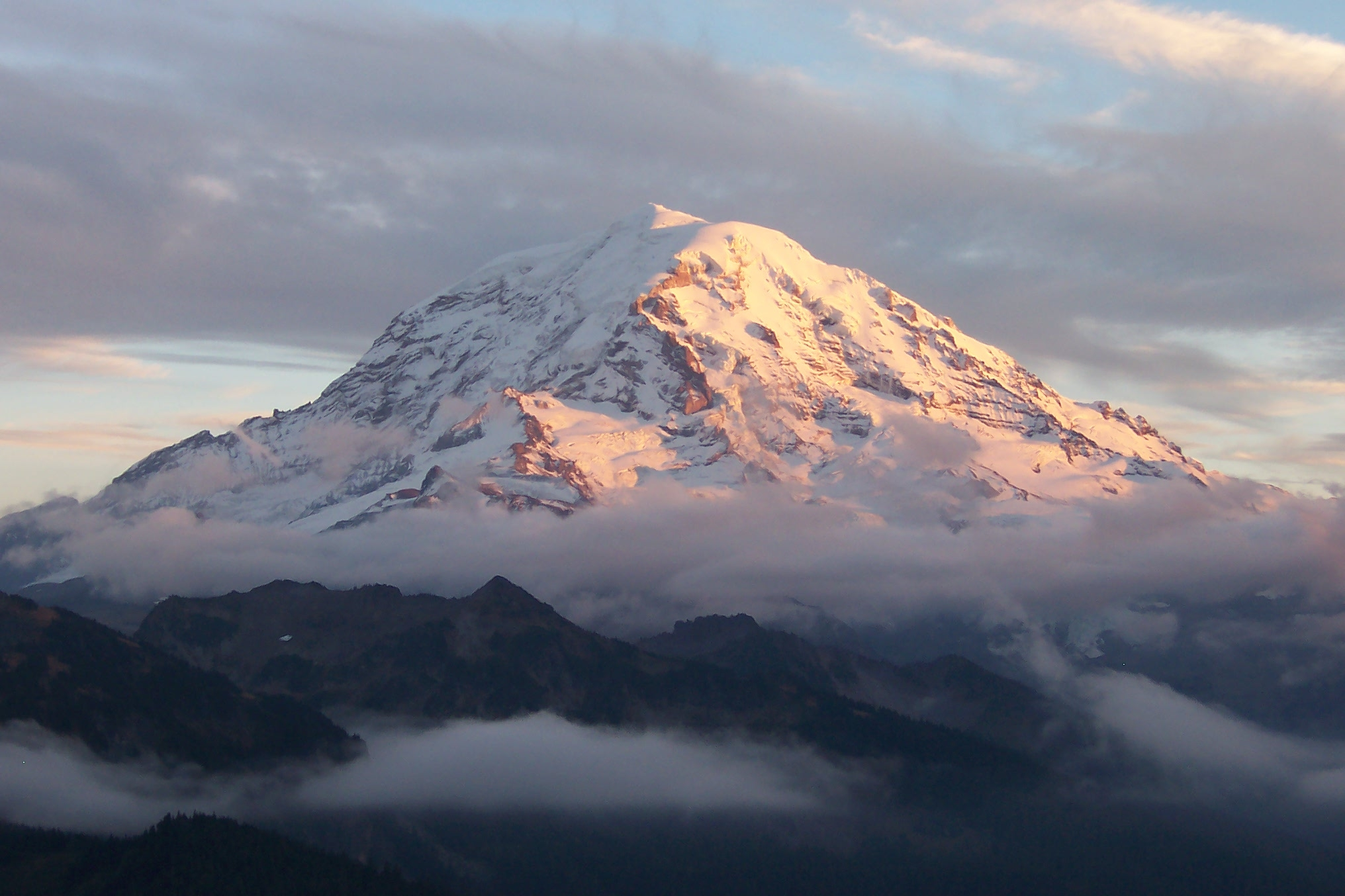
Mount Rainier

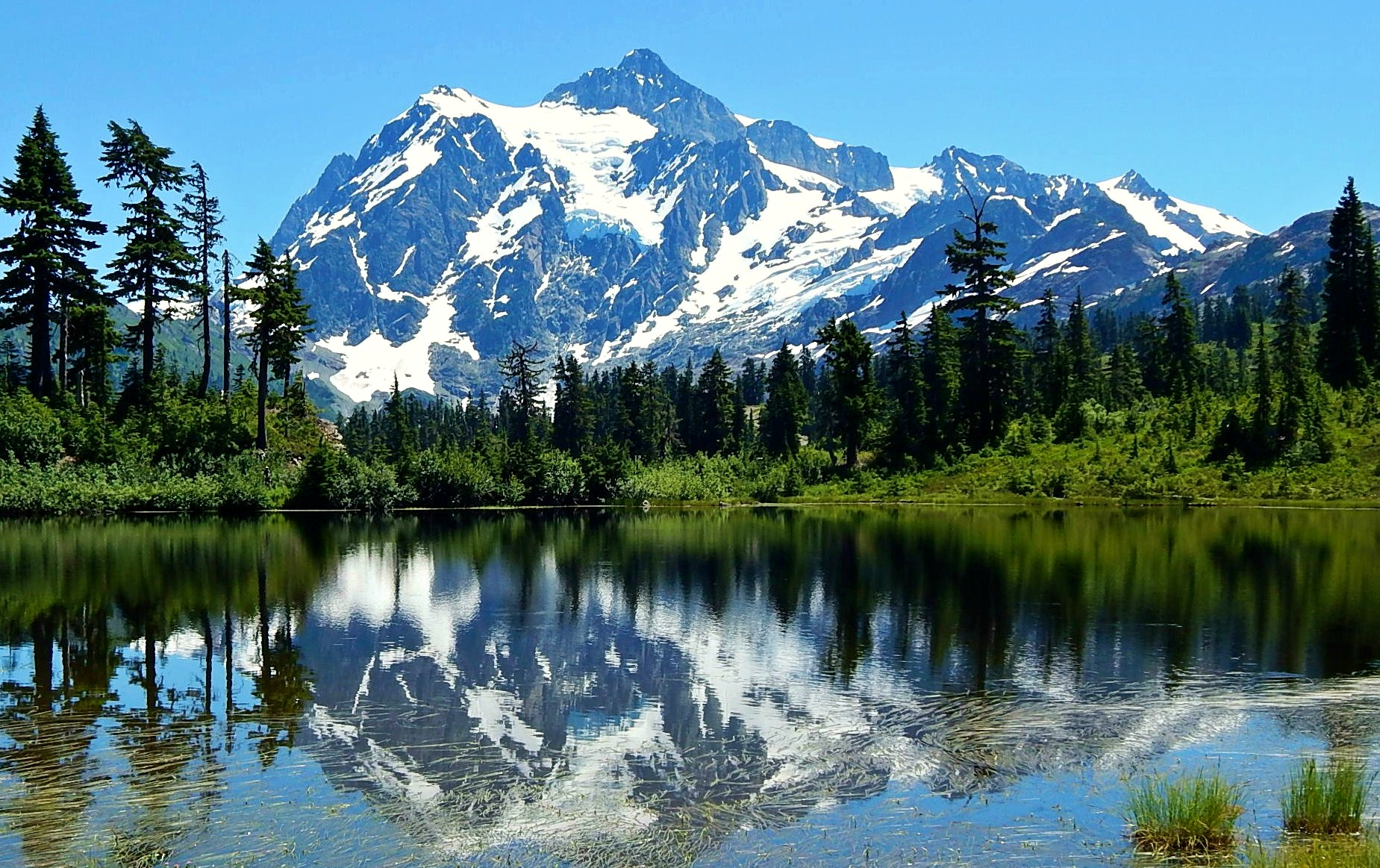
Mount Shuksan

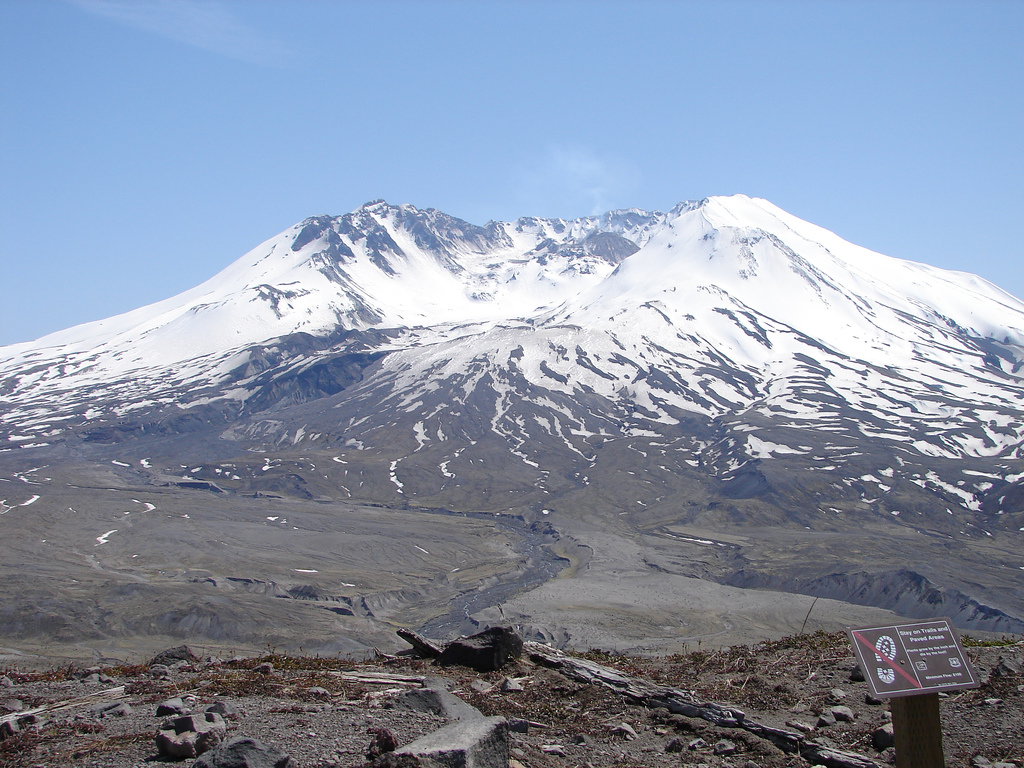
Mount St. Helens

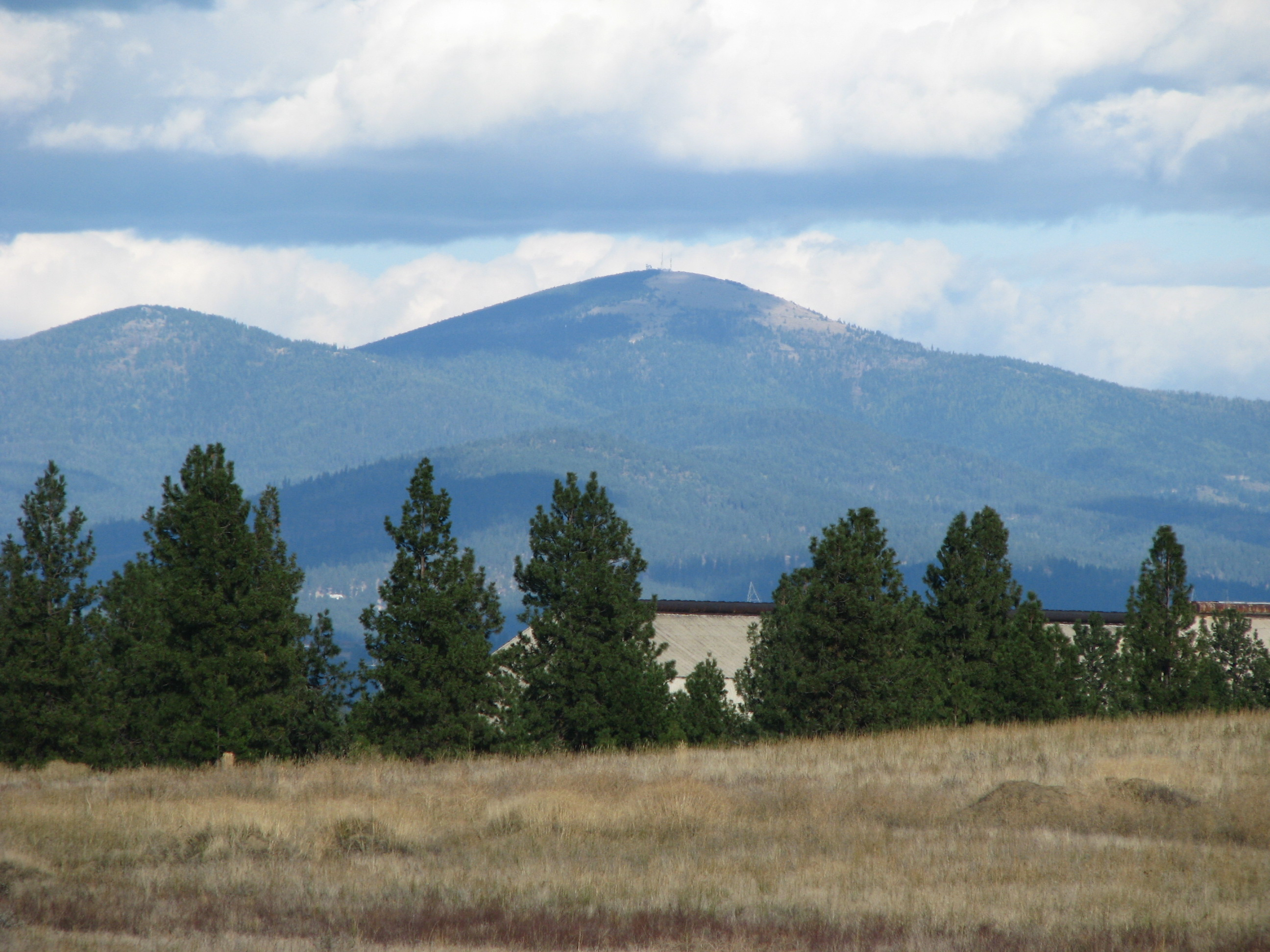
Mount Spokane

- Abercrombie Mountain
- Abiel Peak
- Adelaide Peak
- Agnes Mountain
- Alaska Mountain
- Alta Mountain
- American Border Peak
- Amphitheater Mountain
- Antler Peak
- Apex Mountain
- Argonaut Peak
- Aries
- Arrowhead Mountain
- Athena
- Azurite Peak
- Bacon Peak
- Baekos Peak
- Bald Eagle Peak
- Bandit Peak
- Bannock Mountain
- Bear Mountain
- Bearcat Ridge
- Bearpaw Mountain
- Bears Breast Mountain
- Bedal Peak
- Beebe Mountain
- Bessemer Mountain
- Big Bear Mountain
- Big Chiwaukum
- Big Craggy Peak
- Big Devil Peak
- Big Jim Mountain
- Big Kangaroo
- Big Lou
- Big Snow Mountain
- Bills Peak
- Bismarck Peak
- Black Mountain
- Black Peak
- Blackbeard Peak
- Blue Lake Peak
- Blue Mountain
- Bonanza Peak
- Boston Peak
- Boulder Ridge
- Brahma Peak
- Buck Mountain
- Buckner Mountain
- Bulls Tooth
- Burnt Boot Peak
- Burroughs Mountain
- Cadet Peak
- Colquhoun Peak
- Camp Robber Peak
- Cape Horn
- Cardinal Peak
- Carne Mountain
- Cascade Peak
- Cashmere Mountain
- Castle Mountain
- Castle Peak
- Castle Peak (Cowlitz County, Washington)
- Castle Rock (Chelan County)
- Cathedral Peak
- Cathedral Rock
- Cat Peak
- Chair Peak
- Chikamin Peak
- Chilly Peak
- Chimney Peak
- Chiwawa Mountain
- Chutla Peak
- Cirque Mountain
- Cloudy Peak
- Colchuck Balanced Rock
- Colchuck Peak
- Coldwater Peak
- Colonial Peak
- Cone Mountain
- Constitution Crags
- Copper Mountain (Mason County, Washington)
- Copper Mountain (Pierce County, Washington)
- Copper Peak
- Corteo Peak
- Courtney Peak
- Cowboy Mountain
- Crater Mountain
- Crescent Mountain
- Crooked Bum
- Crystal Peak
- Crystal Peak (Olympic Mountains)
- Cutthroat Peak
- Damnation Peak
- Davis Peak
- Del Campo Peak
- Denny Mountain
- Desolation Peak
- Devils Peak
- Devils Thumb
- Devore Peak
- Dip Top Peak
- Dirty Harry's Peak
- Dodger Point
- Dog Mountain
- Dome Peak
- Dorado Needle
- Dragontail Peak
- Dumbell Mountain
- Dungeon Peak
- Earl Peak
- Early Morning Spire
- Early Winters Spires
- Easy Peak
- Edward Peak
- Eightmile Mountain
- Eldorado Peak
- Electric Butte
- Elephant Butte
- Elija Ridge
- Elk Mountain (Clallam County, Washington)
- Emerald Peak
- Esmeralda Peaks
- Fay Peak
- Fifth of July Mountain
- Finney Peak
- Fisher Peak
- Foggy Peak
- Forbidden Peak, in North Cascades National Park
- Fortune Peak
- Four Brothers
- French Cabin Mountain
- Frisco Mountain
- Gabriel Peak
- Gamma Peak
- Gardner Mountain
- Garfield Mountain
- Genesis Peak
- Gilbert Peak
- Gilhooley Tower
- Glacier Peak, stratovolcano, highest point of Snohomish County
- Glee Peak
- Glory Mountain
- Goat Island Mountain
- Golden Horn
- Goode Mountain
- Gothic Peak
- Granite Mountain (Wenatchee Mountains)
- Granite Mountain (Whatcom County, Washington)
- Grasshopper Peak
- Gray Peak
- Graybeard Peak
- Green Mountain (King County, Washington)
- Green Mountain (Snohomish County, Washington)
- Grindstone Mountain
- Gunn Peak
- Guye Peak
- Hagan Mountain
- Half Moon (Washington)
- Hal Foss Peak
- Hall Peak
- Hannegan Peak
- Harding Mountain
- Hawkins Mountain
- Helmet Butte
- Hibox Mountain
- Hidden Lake Peaks
- Himmelhorn
- Hinkhouse Peak
- Hock Mountain
- Holliway Mountain
- Hoodoo Peak
- Hozomeen Mountain
- Huckleberry Mountain
- Humpback Mountain
- Hurricane Hill
- Ice Box
- Icy Peak
- Indecision Peak
- Indian Head Peak
- Indian Mountain
- Ingalls Peak
- Inner Constance
- Inspiration Peak
- Iron Cap Mountain
- Iron Mountain (Jefferson County, Washington)
- Iron Mountain (Pierce County, Washington)
- Jack Mountain
- Jackita Ridge
- Jefferson Peak
- Jim Hill Mountain
- Johannesburg Mountain
- Johnson Mountain (Washington)
- Jove Peak
- Jumbo Mountain
- Jumbo Peak
- Kaleetan Peak
- Kamiak Butte
- Kelly Butte
- Kennedy Peak
- Kimtah Peak
- Kitling Peak
- Klawatti Peak
- Kodak Peak
- Kololo Peaks
- Krell Hill
- Kyes Peak
- La Bohn Peak
- Labyrinth Mountain
- Ladies Peak
- Lane Peak
- Le Conte Mountain
- Liberty Bell Mountain
- Liberty Mountain
- Lichtenberg Mountain
- Little Big Chief Mountain
- Little Devil Peak
- Little Jack
- Little Tahoma Peak
- Logger Butte
- Lookout Mountain
- Lost Peak
- Lost Peak (Jefferson County, Washington)
- Luahna Peak
- Ludden Peak
- Luna Peak
- Mac Peak
- Magic Mountain
- Maiden Peak
- Mailbox Peak
- Majestic Mountain
- Malachite Peak
- Mantis Peak
- Maple Mountain
- Marcus Peak
- Martin Peak
- Martin Peak (Methow Mountains)
- Martin Peak (Olympic Mountains)
- McCartney Peak
- McClellan Butte
- McGregor Mountain
- McKay Ridge
- McLeod Mountain
- McMillan Spire
- McNeeley Peak
- Merchant Peak
- Mesahchie Peak
- Mica Peak, consists of two peaks, one in Idaho, and one in Washington.
- Middle Peak
- Mineral Mountain
- Minnie Peak
- Mix-up Peak
- Monument Peak
- Moolock Mountain
- Morning Star Peak
- Mother Lode
- Mother Mountain
- Mount Adams, stratovolcano
- Mount Aix
- Mount Anderson
- Mount Ann
- Mount Appleton
- Mount Arriva
- Mount Baker, active stratovolcano, highest point of Whatcom County
- Mount Ballard
- Mount Baring
- Mount Barnes
- Mount Benzarino
- Mount Berge
- Mount Bigelow
- Mount Blum, in North Cascades National Park
- Mount Bretherton
- Mount Buckindy
- Mount Bullen
- Mount Cameron
- Mount Carrie
- Mount Carru
- Mount Challenger
- Mount Chardonnay
- Mount Chaval
- Mount Childs
- Mount Christie
- Mount Clark
- Mount Claywood
- Mount Constance
- Mount Constitution, summit of Orcas Island
- Mount Crowder
- Mount Cruiser
- Mount Dana
- Mount Daniel, highest point of King County
- Mount David
- Mount Deception
- Mount Defiance
- Mount Degenhardt
- Mount Delabarre
- Mount Despair
- Mount Dickerman
- Mount Elk Lick
- Mount Erie, summit of Fidalgo Island
- Mount Fairchild
- Mount Fernow
- Mount Fernow (King County, Washington)
- Mount Ferry
- Mount Fitzhenry
- Mount Forgotten
- Mount Formidable
- Mount Fricaba
- Mount Fromme
- Mount Fury
- Mount Hardy
- Mount Henderson
- Mount Hermann
- Mount Higgins
- Mount Hopper
- Mount Horrible
- Mount Howard
- Mount Index
- Mount Johnson
- Mount Jupiter
- Mount Kent
- Mount Kit Carson
- Mount LaCrosse
- Mount Larrabee
- Mount Lago
- Mount Lawson
- Mount Lena
- Mount Lincoln
- Mount Logan
- Mount Margaret
- Mount Mastiff
- Mount Mathias
- Mount Maude
- Mount Meany
- Mount Misch
- Mount Mitchell
- Mount Mystery
- Mount Norton
- Mount Noyes
- Mount Olympus, highest summit of Olympic Mountains
- Mount Pershing
- Mount Persis
- Mount Pilchuck
- Mount Prophet
- Mount Pugh
- Mount Pulitzer
- Mount Queets
- **Mount Rainier**, active stratovolcano that is the highest summit of the Cascade Mountains and Washington
- Mount Redoubt
- Mount Roosevelt
- Mount Rose
- Mount Ross
- Mount Saul
- Mount Scott
- Mount Seattle
- Mount Sefrit
- Mount Shuksan
- Mount Si
- Mount Spickard
- Mount Spokane
- Mount St. Helens, active stratovolcano that erupted violently on 1980-05-18
- Mount Steel
- Mount Stone
- Mount Stuart
- Mount Terror
- Mount Thomson
- Mount Tom
- Mount Tommy Thompson
- Mount Torment
- Mount Triumph
- Mount Walkinshaw
- Mount Washington (Cascades)
- Mount Washington
- Mount Watson
- Mount Whittier
- Mount Wilder
- Mount Winthrop
- Mount Worthington
- Mount Wow
- Mount Zindorf
- Mox Peaks
- Muncaster Mountain
- Napeequa Peak
- Navaho Peak
- Nodoubt Peak
- North Big Bosom Butte
- North Gardner Mountain
- North Lookout Mountain, known locally as Galbraith Mountain
- North Star Mountain
- Obstruction Peak
- Old Desolate
- O'Neil Peak
- Oregon Butte
- Osceola Peak
- Painted Mountain
- Palisades Peak
- Paul Bunyans Stump
- Pasayten Peak
- Pelton Peak
- Perdition Peak
- Petunia Peak
- Pica Peak
- Pierce Mountain
- Pinnacle Mountain
- Pinnacle Peak (King County, Washington)
- Pinnacle Peak (Lewis County, Washington)
- Pinnacle Peak (Whatcom County, Washington)
- Piro's Spire
- Plummer Peak
- Plummer Mountain
- Pocket Peak
- Porcupine Peak
- Portal Peak
- Powder Mountain
- Prairie Mountain
- Pyramid Peak (Pierce County, Washington)
- Pyramid Peak (Whatcom County, Washington)
- Rainy Peak
- Rampart Ridge (Washington)
- Rattlesnake Mountain
- Rattlesnake Ridge
- Red Face Mountain
- Red Mountain (Skagit County, Washington)
- Remmel Mountain
- Repulse Peak
- Rhino Butte
- Riddle Peaks
- Robinson Mountain
- Rock Mountain
- Rocky Peak
- Ruby Mountain
- Ruth Mountain
- Ruth Peak
- Sahale Mountain
- Saska Peak
- Sauk Mountain
- Scorpion Mountain
- Sentinel Peak
- Sentinel Peak (Jefferson County, Washington)
- Seven Fingered Jack
- Seymour Peak
- Sharkfin Tower
- Sheep Mountain (Okanogan County, Washington)
- Sheep Mountain
- Sherman Peak
- Sherpa Peak
- Shull Mountain
- Silver Eagle Peak
- Silver Star Mountain, in Okanogan County
- Silvertip Peak
- Sitting Bull Mountain
- Skagit Peak
- Skykomish Peak
- Skyscraper Mountain
- Slate Peak
- Sleeping Beauty
- Sloan Peak
- Sluiskin Mountain
- Snoqualmie Mountain
- Snowfield Peak
- Snowgrass Mountain
- Snowking Mountain
- Sourdough Mountain
- Spark Plug Mountain
- Spectacle Buttes
- Sperry Peak
- Spider Mountain
- Spire Mountain
- Spratt Mountain
- Stephen Peak
- Steptoe Butte
- Styloid Peak
- Summit Chief Mountain
- Sundial
- Sunrise Peak
- Surprise Mountain
- Switchback Peak
- Syncline Mountain
- Tahtlum Peak
- Tamarack Peak
- Tatie Peak
- Teanaway Peak
- Tekoa Mountain
- Tenpeak Mountain
- Terrace Mountain
- The Brothers
- The Chopping Block
- The Cradle
- The Dome
- The Needles
- The Pulpit
- The Roost
- The Temple
- The Triad
- Thor Peak
- Three Brothers
- Three Fingers
- Three Queens
- Three Wives
- Thunder Mountain
- Tieton Peak
- Tiffany Mountain
- Tinkham Peak
- Tolmie Peak
- Tomyhoi Peak
- Trapper Mountain
- Trappers Peak
- Treen Peak
- Trico Mountain
- Tricouni Peak
- Tumtum Peak
- Tupshin Peak
- Twin Needles
- Twin Sisters Mountain
- Twisp Mountain
- Tyler Peak
- Underwood Mountain
- Unicorn Peak
- Unicorn Peak, (Olympic Mountains)
- Wallaby Peak
- Warrior Peak
- Wedge Mountain
- Welch Peaks
- West Peak
- Whatcom Peak
- Whistler Mountain
- Witches Tower
- White Chuck Mountain
- White Goat Mountain
- White Mountain (Olympic Mountains)
- White Mountain
- Whitehorse Mountain
- Whittier Peak
- Wild Goat Peak
- Wilmans Peaks
- Wind Mountain
- Windy Peak
- Woden
- Wright Mountain
- Yakima Peak
- Yellow Aster Butte

=== West Virginia ===
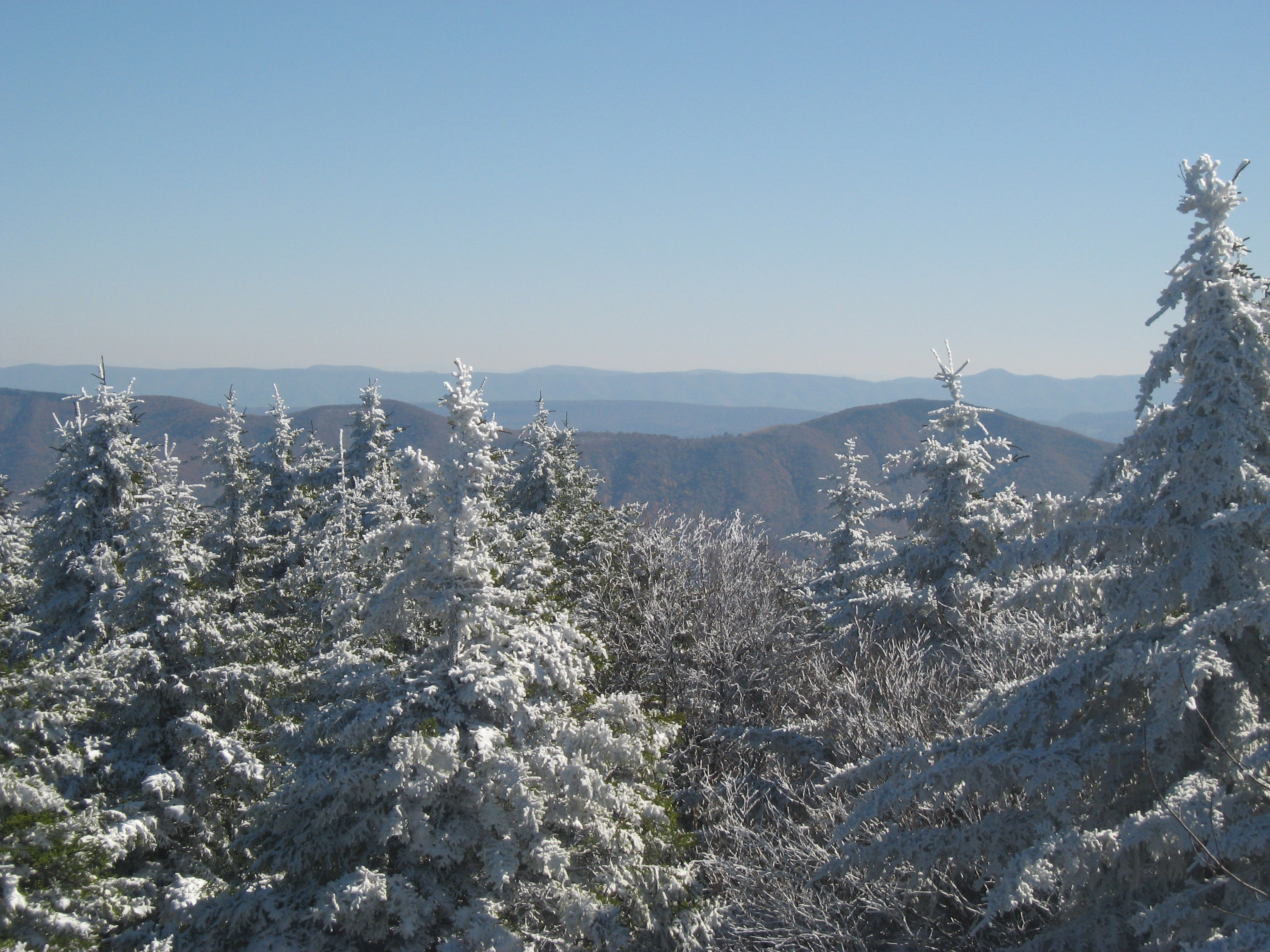
Spruce Knob

* Allegheny Mountain
- Back Allegheny Mountain
- Baker Mountain
- Bald Knob
- Big Schloss
- Cacapon Mountain
- Castle Mountain (Pendleton County, West Virginia)
- Cheat Mountain
- Cooper Mountain
- Great North Mountain
- Knobly Mountain
- Little Cacapon Mountain
- Mill Creek Mountain
- Mount Porte Crayon
- Nathaniel Mountain
- North Fork Mountain
- North Mountain
- North River Mountain
- Patterson Creek Mountain
- Reddish Knob
- Saddle Mountain
- Shavers Mountain
- Sideling Hill
- Sleepy Creek Mountain
- South Branch Mountain
- Spring Gap Mountain
- **Spruce Knob**, highest summit of the Allegheny Mountains and the State of West Virginia
- Third Hill Mountain

=== Wisconsin ===
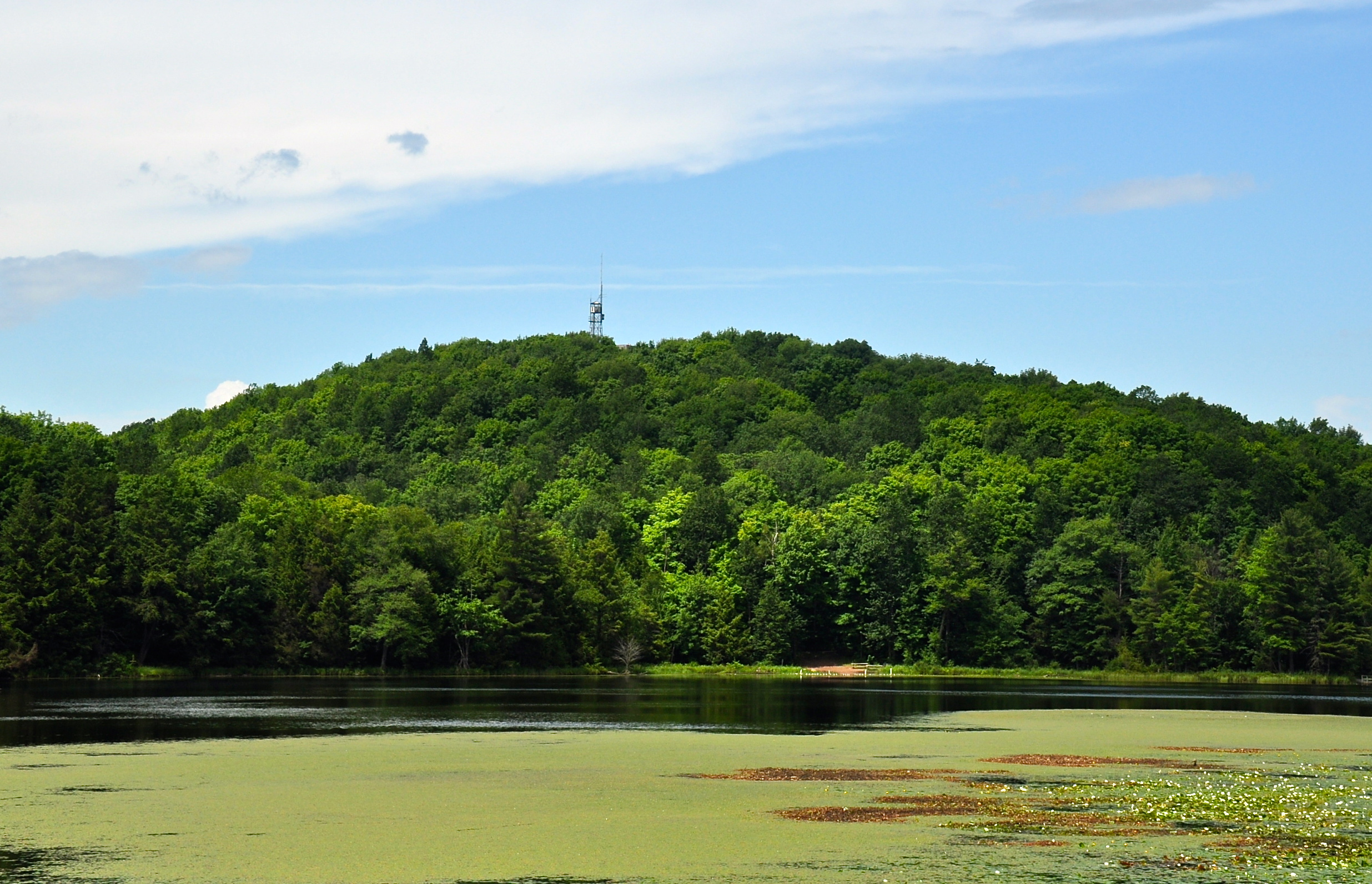
Timms Hill

- Baraboo Range
- Blue Mounds, highest summit of the Ocooch Mountains
- Belmont Mound, (Ocooch Mountains)
- Mount Pisgah
- Platte Mound, (Ocooch Mountains)
- Wildcat Mountain
- Ocooch Mountains, highest and most rugged part of the Driftless Area of the upper Midwest.
- Penokee Mountains, an ancient heavily eroded mountain range spanning northern Wisconsin and Michigan
- Rib Mountain
- **Timms Hill**, highest summit of the State of Wisconsin

=== Wyoming ===
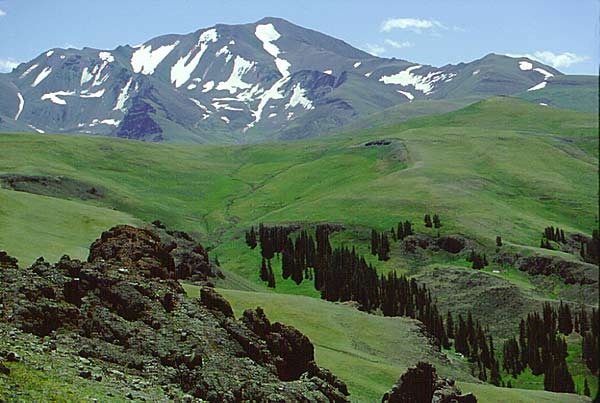
Francs Peak

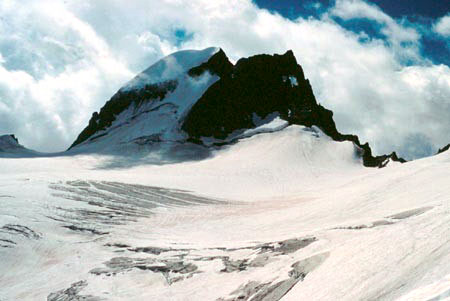
Gannett Peak

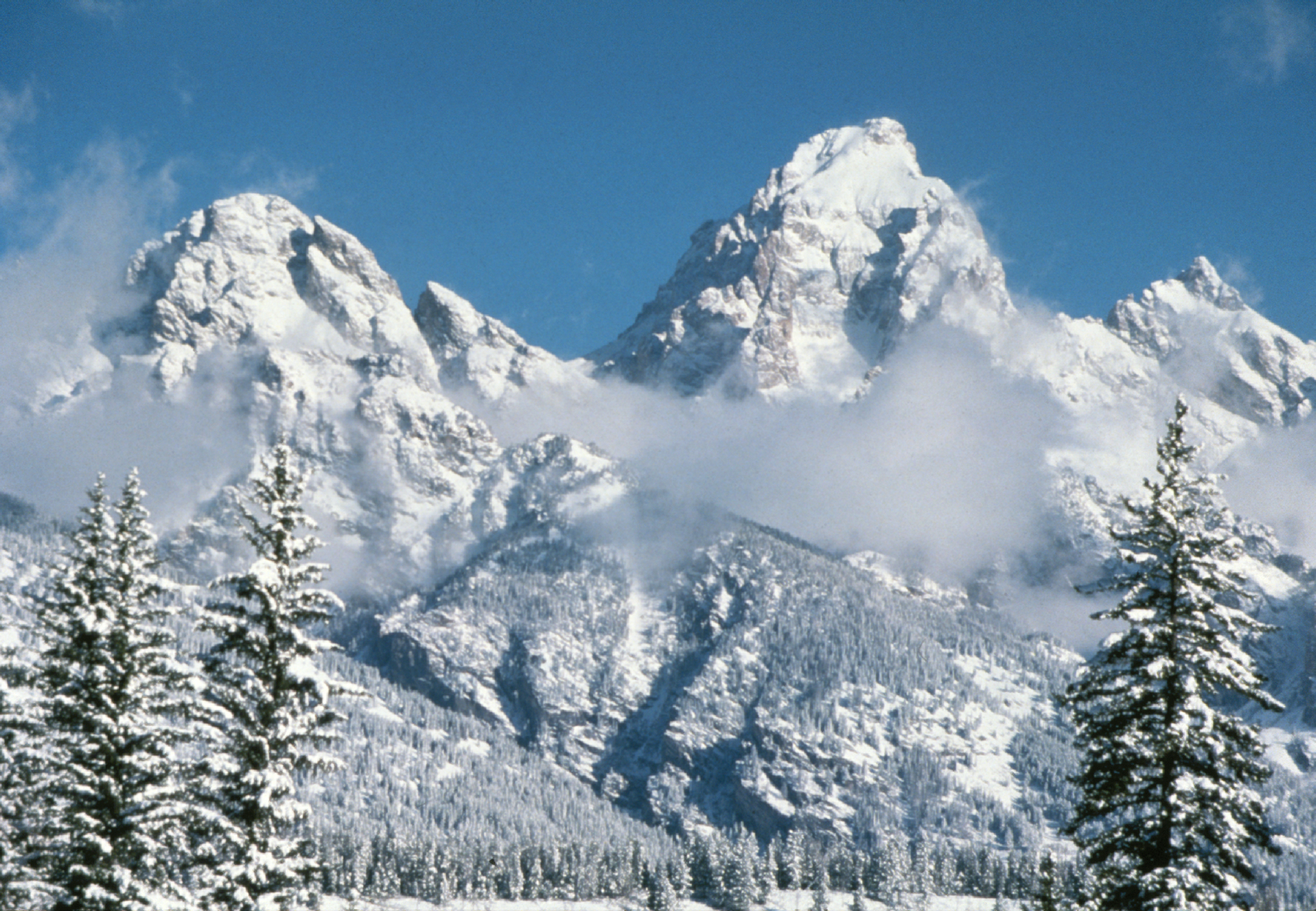
Grand Teton

- Amphitheater Mountain
- Atlantic Peak
- Bastion Peak
- Beaver Mountain
- Bivouac Peak
- Black Tooth Mountain
- Bollinger Peak
- Bomber Mountain
- Brown Cliff North
- Buck Mountain
- Bunsen Peak
- Carter Mountain
- Casper Mountain
- Cedar Mountain
- Cloud Peak, highest summit of the Big Horn Mountains and the northernmost 4000 meter peak of the Rocky Mountains
- Cloudveil Dome
- Darwin Peak
- Disappointment Peak
- Doane Peak
- Doublet Peak
- Doubletop Peak
- Eagle Peak, highest summit of Yellowstone National Park
- Eagles Rest Peak
- Elk Mountain (Carbon County, Wyoming)
- Elk Mountain (Teton County, Wyoming)
- Ferris Mountain
- Forellen Peak
- Fossil Mountain
- Francs Peak
- Fremont Peak
- **Gannett Peak**, highest summit of the Wind River Range, the Central Rocky Mountains, and the State of Wyoming
- Garfield Peak
- Grand Teton, highest summit of the Teton Range and the westernmost 4000 meter peak of the Rocky Mountains
- Gray Peak
- Harrower Peak
- Haystack Mountain
- Heart Mountain
- Hellroaring Mountain
- Hobbs Peak
- Hodges Peak
- Hoodoo Peak
- Hurricane Mesa
- Indian Peak
- Jackson Peak
- Jim Mountain
- Ladd Peak
- Laramie Peak
- Lizard Head Peak
- Loaf Mountain
- Man Peak
- Medicine Bow Peak
- Middle Teton
- Missouri Buttes
- Mount Febbas
- Mount Fitzpatrick, highest summit of the Salt River Range
- Mount Geikie
- Mount Helen
- Mount Humphreys
- Mount Lester
- Mount Moran
- Mount Nystrom
- Mount Owen
- Mount Sacagawea
- Mount Saint John
- Mount Warren
- Mount Washburn
- Mount Wister
- Mount Woodring
- Mount Woodrow Wilson
- Nez Perce Peak
- Owl Peak
- Penrose Peak
- Pinnacle Buttes
- Pollux Peak
- Ramshorn Peak
- Ranger Peak
- Raynolds Peak
- Rendezvous Mountain
- Republic Mountain
- Roberts Mountain
- Rockchuck Peak
- Rolling Thunder Mountain
- Saddle Mountain
- Schiestler Peak
- Signal Mountain
- Silvertip Peak
- South Teton
- Spider Peak
- Squaretop Mountain
- Static Peak
- Steeple Peak
- Sublette Mountain, highest summit of the Southern Wyoming Overthrust Belt
- Symmetry Spire
- Table Mountain
- Teepe Pillar
- Teewinot Mountain
- Thor Peak
- Tongue Butte
- Top Notch Peak
- Traverse Peak
- Trout Peak
- Two Ocean Mountain
- Virginia Peak
- Wapiti Ridge
- White Rock
- Wind River Peak
- Wyoming Peak, highest summit of the Wyoming Range
- Younts Peak

== Summit disambiguation ==
The following list includes links to disambiguation and set index articles for topographic summits of the United States with identical names. The United States Board on Geographic Names is the official authority for all United States geographic names. The United States Geological Survey Geographic Names Information System provides Internet access to these geographic names.

- Bald Eagle Mountain – 7 summits in 6 states
- Bald Knob – 142 summits in 30 states
- Bald Mountain – 303 summits in 31 states
- Baldy Mountain – 56 summits in 17 states
- Baldy Peak – 19 summits in 12 states
- Bear Mountain – 144 summits in 30 states
- Black Butte – 113 summits in 14 states
- Black Mesa – 41 summits in 7 states
- Black Mountain – 266 summits in 29 states
- Boundary Peak – 8 summits in 7 states
- Camelback Mountain – 9 summits in 6 states
- Campbell Hill – 20 summits in 15 states
- Capitol Peak – 6 summits in 5 states
- Castle Peak – 24 summits in 10 states
- Cloud Peak – 4 summits in Alaska, Michigan, and Wyoming
- Crater Peak – 8 summits in 7 states
- Crown Mountain – 6 summits in 5 states and a summit in a territory
- Diamond Peak – 22 summits in 11 states
- Eagle Mountain – 41 summits in 20 states
- Eagle Peak – 44 summits in 15 states
- El Capitan – 6 summits in 5 states
- Elk Mountain – 60 summits in 14 states
- Flat Top Mountain – 41 summits in 18 states
- Fairview Peak – 4 summits in Colorado, Nevada, and Oregon
- Fremont Peak – 7 summits in 5 states
- Gilbert Peak – 2 summits in Utah and Washington
- Glass Mountain – 3 summits in California and a summit in Oregon
- Granite Mountain – 57 summits in 17 states
- Granite Peak – 42 summits in 12 states
- Grizzly Peak – 22 summits in 7 states
- High Point – 43 summits in 19 states
- Humboldt Peak – 3 summits in California, Colorado, and Nevada
- King Peak – 3 summits in Arizona, California, and Nevada
- Kings Peak – 2 summits in Idaho and Utah
- Lookout Mountain – 113 summits in 28 states
- Matterhorn – 3 summits in Arizona, Nevada, and Oregon
- Mount Adams – 7 summits in 6 states
- Mount Bailey – 2 summits in Colorado and Oregon
- Mount Baldy 22 summits in 13 states
- Mount Cleveland – 4 summits in Alaska, Montana, and Vermont
- Mount Dana – 3 summits in Alaska, California, and Washington
- Mount Davis – 7 summits in 5 states
- Mount Douglas – 2 summits in Alaska and a summit in Montana
- Mount Ellen – 2 summits in Utah and Vermont
- Mount Hood – 3 summits in California, Massachusetts, and Oregon
- Mount Hopkins – 2 summits in Arizona and California
- Mount Jackson – 10 summits in 7 states
- Mount Jefferson – 10 summits in 10 states
- Mount Kimball – 3 summits in Alaska, Arizona, and Colorado
- Mount Lincoln – 8 summits in 7 states
- Mount Marcy – 4 summits in 4 states
- Mount Michelson – 2 summits in Alaska
- Mount Mitchell – 3 summits in North Carolina, Oregon, and Washington
- Mount Morgan – 5 summits in 4 states
- Mount Nebo – 28 summits in 20 states
- Mount Owen – 5 summits in 4 states
- Mount Powell – 5 summits in 5 states
- Mount Russell – a summit in Alaska and 2 summits in California
- Mount Sanford – 2 summits in Alaska and Connecticut
- Mount Steller – 2 summits in Alaska
- Mount Taylor – 2 summits in Nevada and New Mexico
- Mount Tom – 44 summits in 18 states
- Mount Warren – 5 summits in 5 states
- Mount Washington – 14 summits in 10 states and a summit in a territory
- Mount Wilson – 11 summits in 8 states
- Mummy Mountain – 5 summits in 5 states
- North Mountain – 25 summits in 16 states
- Mount Olympus – 9 summits in 8 states
- Pyramid Peak – 45 summits in 11 states
- Red Mountain – 160 summits in 21 states
- Rocky Mountain – 46 summits in 22 states
- Slide Mountain – 26 summits in 13 states
- Split Mountain – 12 summits in 8 states
- Stone Mountain – 31 summits in 15 states
- Storm King Mountain – 5 summits in Colorado, New York, and Washington
- Thompson Peak – 16 summits in 7 states
- Three Sisters – 17 summits in 10 states
- Treasure Mountain – 10 summits in 6 states
- Twin Peak – 6 summits in 4 states
- Twin Peaks – 106 summits in 18 states
- University Peak – 2 summits in Alaska and California
- Wheeler Peak – 6 summits in 4 states
- White Mountain – 44 summits in 19 states
- Wildcat Mountain – 43 summits in 22 states

== See also ==
- List of U.S. states and territories by elevation
- Outline of the United States
- Index of United States-related articles
- Mountain peaks of North America
  - Mountain peaks of the United States
    - Table of the highest major summits of the United States
    - Table of the ultra-prominent summits of the United States
    - Table of the most isolated major summits of the United States
    - Mountain peaks of Alaska
    - Mountain peaks of California
    - Mountain peaks of Colorado
    - Mountain peaks of Hawaii
- Fourteener
- Geography of the United States
- Geology of the United States
- Lists of mountains by region
- List of Ultras of the United States
- Category:Mountains of the United States
  - commons:Category:Mountains of the United States
