= Hawkins Mountain =

Mountain in Washington (state), United States

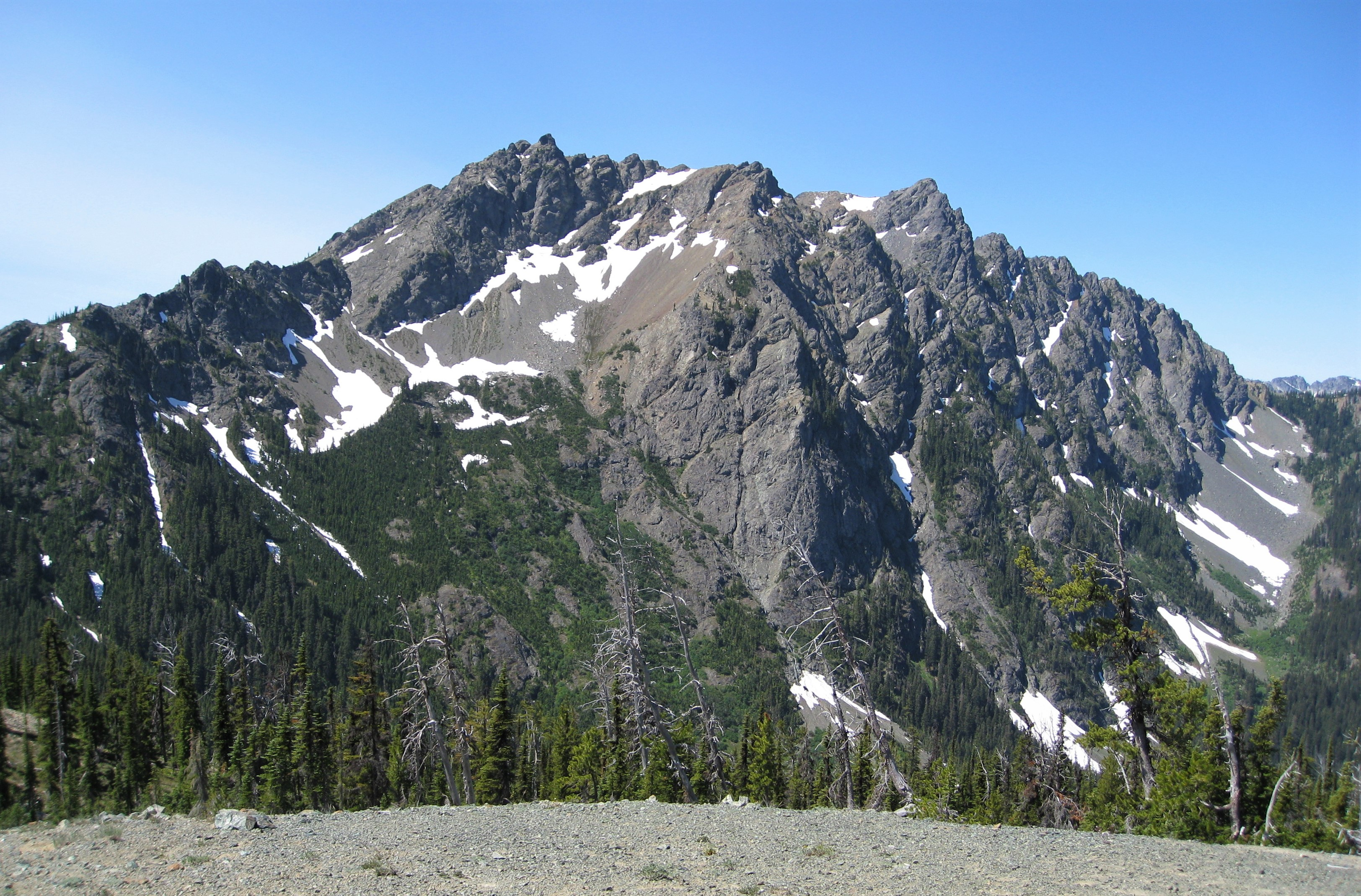
- Hawkins Mountain, northeast aspect

Highest point
- Elevation: 7,160 ft (2,180 m)
- Prominence: 1,520 ft (460 m)
- Parent peak: Ingalls Peak (7,662 ft)
- Isolation: 2.74 mi (4.41 km)
- Coordinates: 47°27′01″N 121°00′05″W

Geography
- Location within Washington (state) Location within the United States
- Country: United States
- State: Washington
- County: Kittitas
- Parent range: Wenatchee Mountains; Cascade Range
- Topo map(s): USGS Davis Peak, Mount Stuart

Geology
- Rock type(s): volcanic serpentine, basalt

Climbing
- First ascent: September 8, 1899 Bailey Willis party
- Easiest route: class 2 hiking South slope

Hawkins Mountain is a 7,160+ ft (2,180+ m) double-summit massif located in Kittitas County of Washington state. Hawkins Mountain is the sixth-highest point in the Teanaway area of the Wenatchee Mountains. The lower (7,080-ft) east summit is also known as Hawkins Thimble. Hawkins is situated three miles southwest of Ingalls Peak, and 1.7 mi (2.7 km) northwest of Esmeralda Peaks, on land managed by Wenatchee National Forest. Precipitation runoff from the peak drains into tributaries of the Teanaway River and Cle Elum River. This mountain was named for prospector Samuel S. Hawkins.

== Climate ==
Lying east of the Cascade crest, the area around Hawkins Mountain is a bit drier than areas to the west. Summers can bring warm temperatures and occasional thunderstorms. Most weather fronts originating in the Pacific Ocean travel east toward the Cascade Mountains. As fronts approach, they are forced upward by the peaks of the Cascade Range, causing them to drop their moisture in the form of rain or snow onto the Cascades (Orographic lift). As a result, the eastern slopes of the Cascades experience lower precipitation than the western slopes. During winter months, weather is usually cloudy, but due to high pressure systems over the Pacific Ocean that intensify during summer months, there is often little or no cloud cover during the summer.

== Gallery ==
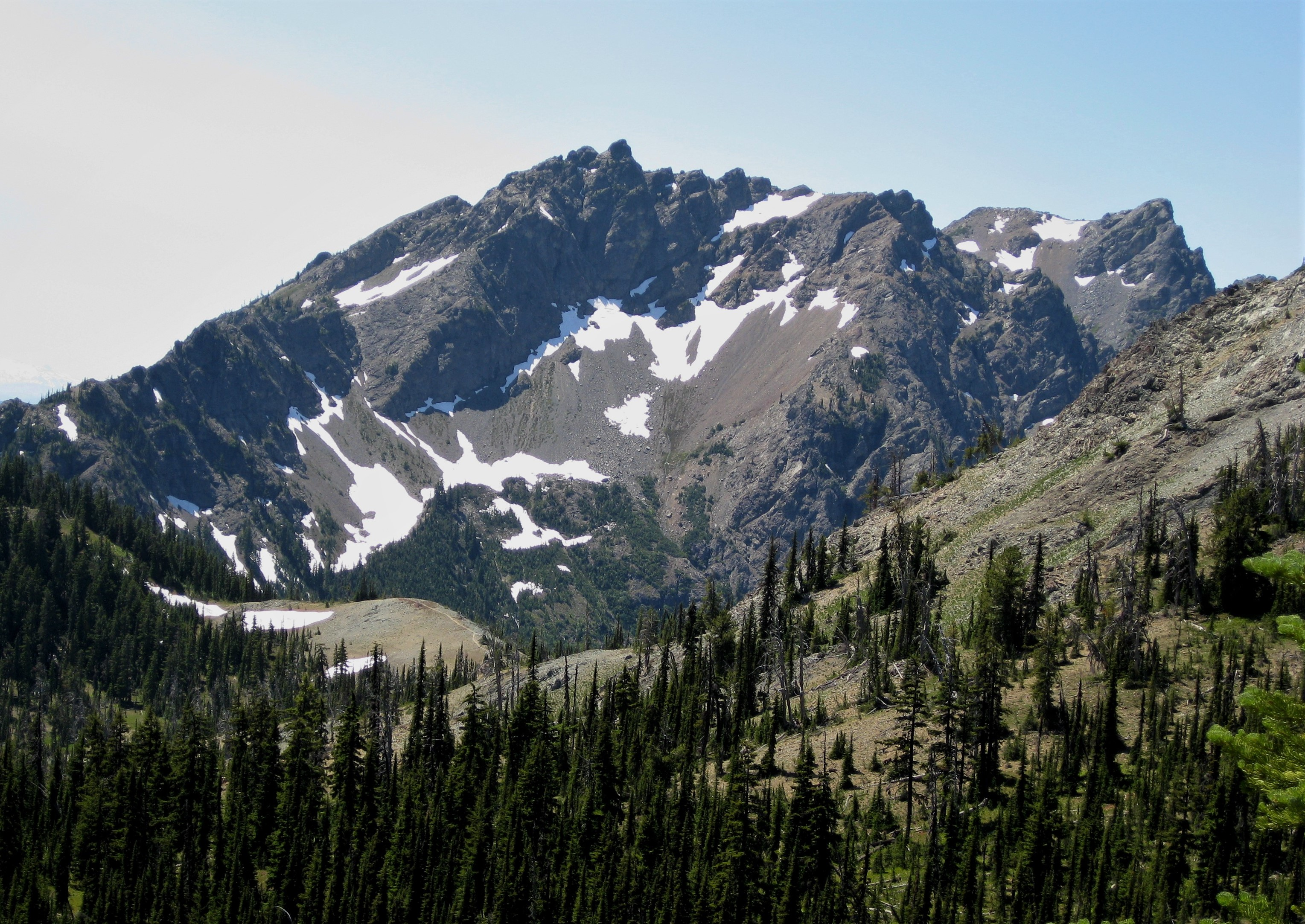
Hawkins Thimble centered, true summit to right

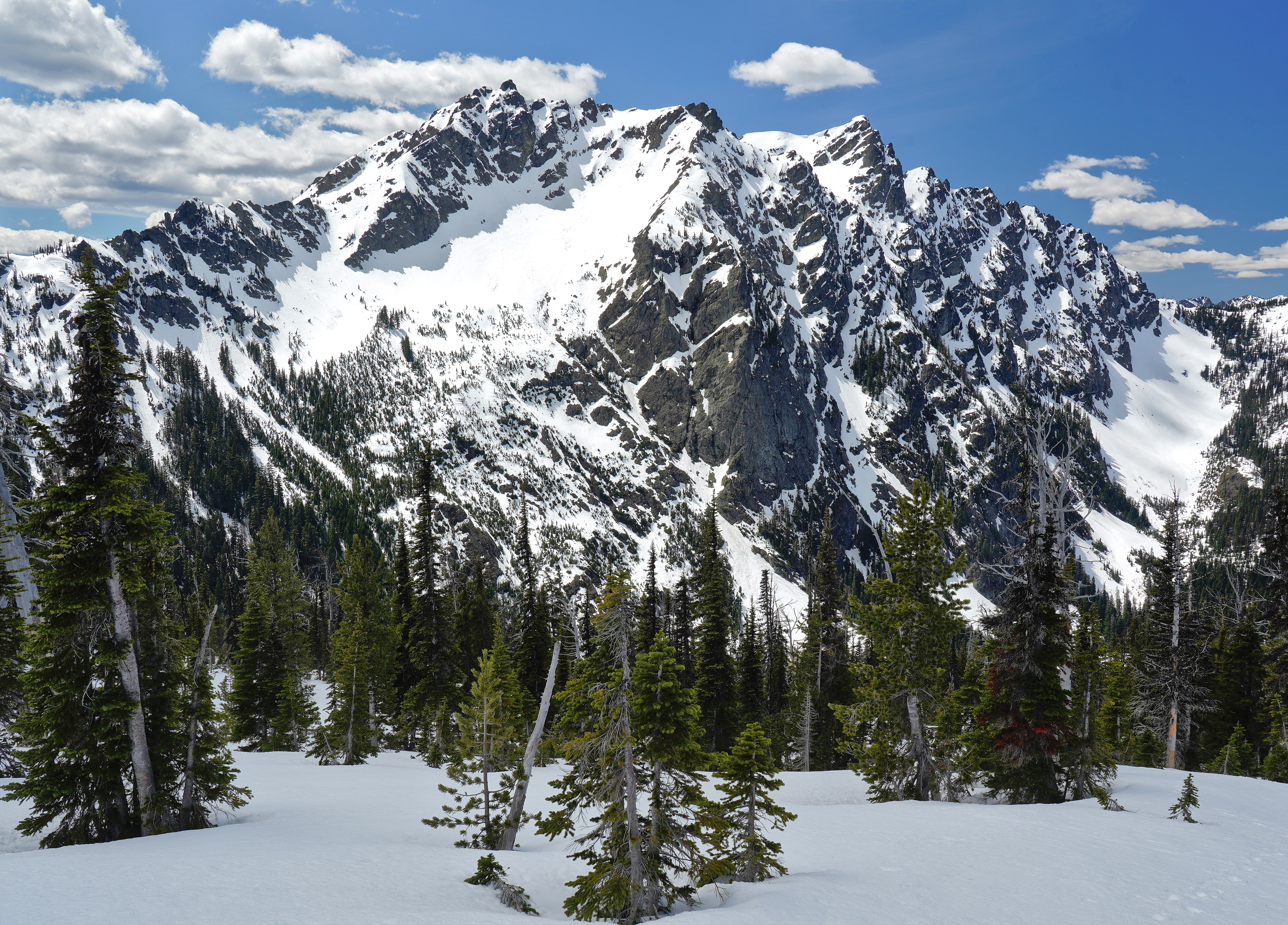
Northeast aspect

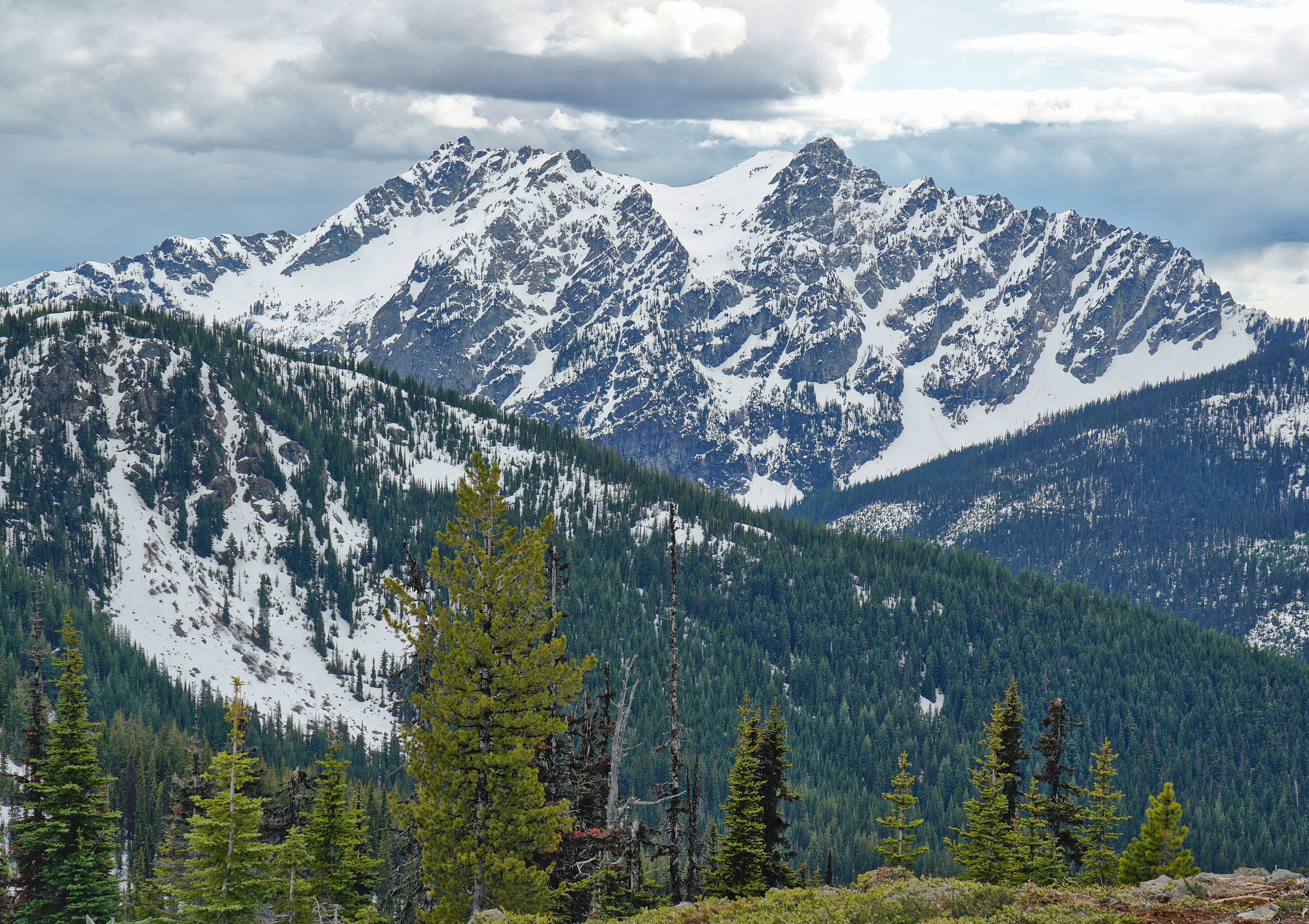
Hawkins Mountain from Van Epps Pass

== See also ==
- Geology of the Pacific Northwest
