= Esmeralda Peaks =

Mountain in Washington (state), United States

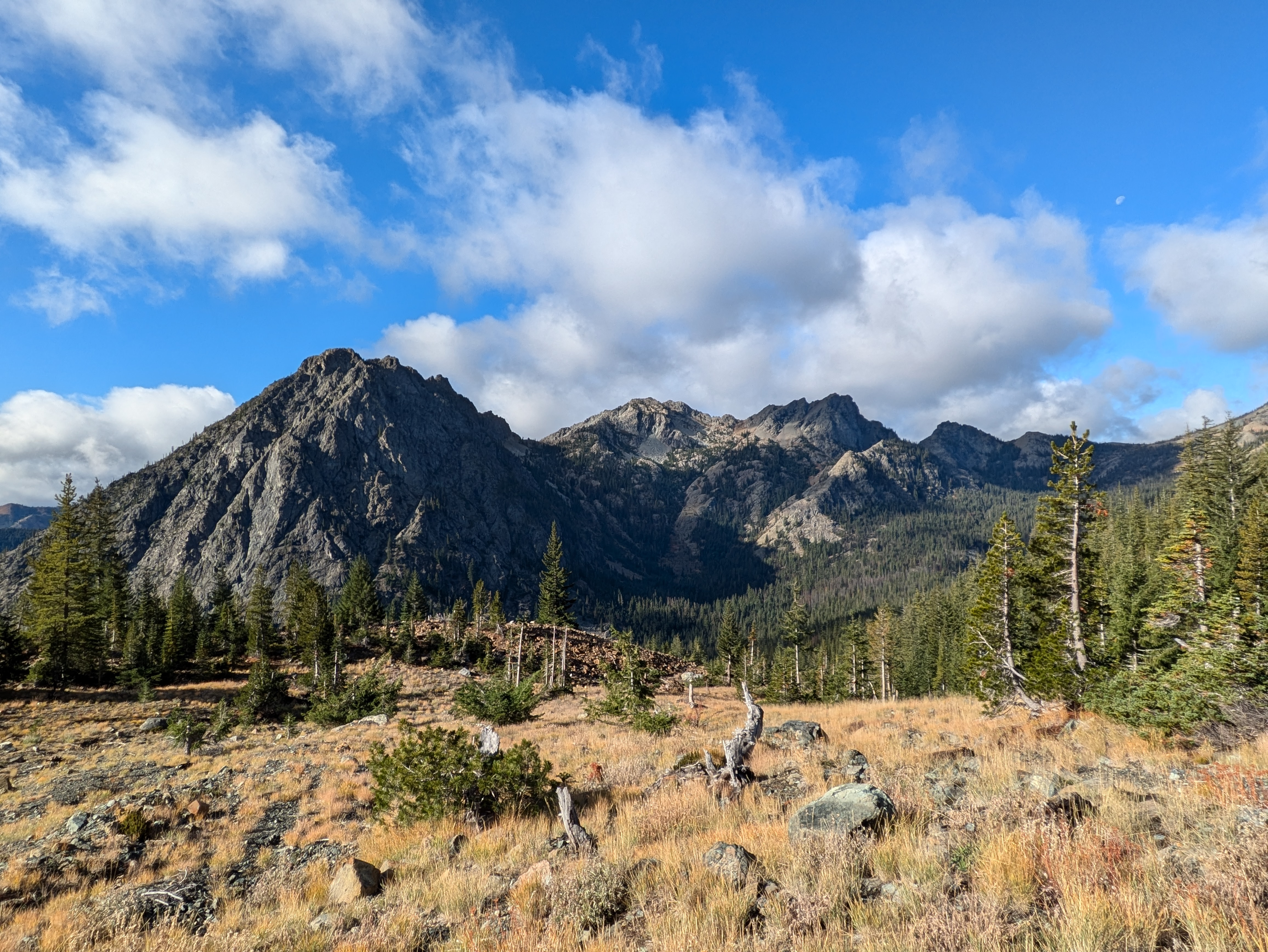
- Esmeralda Peaks from the northeast, 21 October 2024

Highest point
- Elevation: 6,765 ft (2,062 m)
- Prominence: 765 ft (233 m)
- Parent peak: Ingalls Peak (7,662 ft)
- Isolation: 1.67 mi (2.69 km)
- Coordinates: 47°26′26″N 120°58′05″W

Geography
- Location within Washington (state) Location within the United States
- Country: United States
- State: Washington
- County: Kittitas
- Parent range: Wenatchee Mountains; Cascade Range
- Topo map: USGS Mount Stuart

Climbing
- Easiest route: class 2 scrambling

Esmeralda Peaks is a 6,765 ft (2,060 m) multi-summit mountain located in Kittitas County of Washington state. Esmeralda Peaks are in the Teanaway area of the Wenatchee Mountains. Esmeralda Peaks is situated 2.4 mi (3.9 km) south of Ingalls Peak, and 1.7 mi (2.7 km) southeast of Hawkins Mountain, on land managed by Wenatchee National Forest. Precipitation runoff from the peaks drains into tributaries of the Teanaway River. This mountain's name has also been spelled Esmerelda Peaks, however Esmeralda was officially adopted in 1966 by the U.S. Board on Geographic Names.

== Climate ==
Lying east of the Cascade crest, the area around Hawkins Mountain is a bit drier than areas to the west. Summers can bring warm temperatures and occasional thunderstorms. Weather fronts originating in the Pacific Ocean travel east toward the Cascade Mountains. As fronts approach, they are forced upward by the peaks of the Cascade Range, causing them to drop their moisture in the form of rain or snow onto the Cascades (Orographic lift). As a result, the eastern slopes of the Cascades experience lower precipitation than the western slopes. During winter months, weather is usually cloudy, but due to high pressure systems over the Pacific Ocean that intensify during summer months, there is often little or no cloud cover during the summer.

== See also ==
- Geology of the Pacific Northwest

== Gallery ==
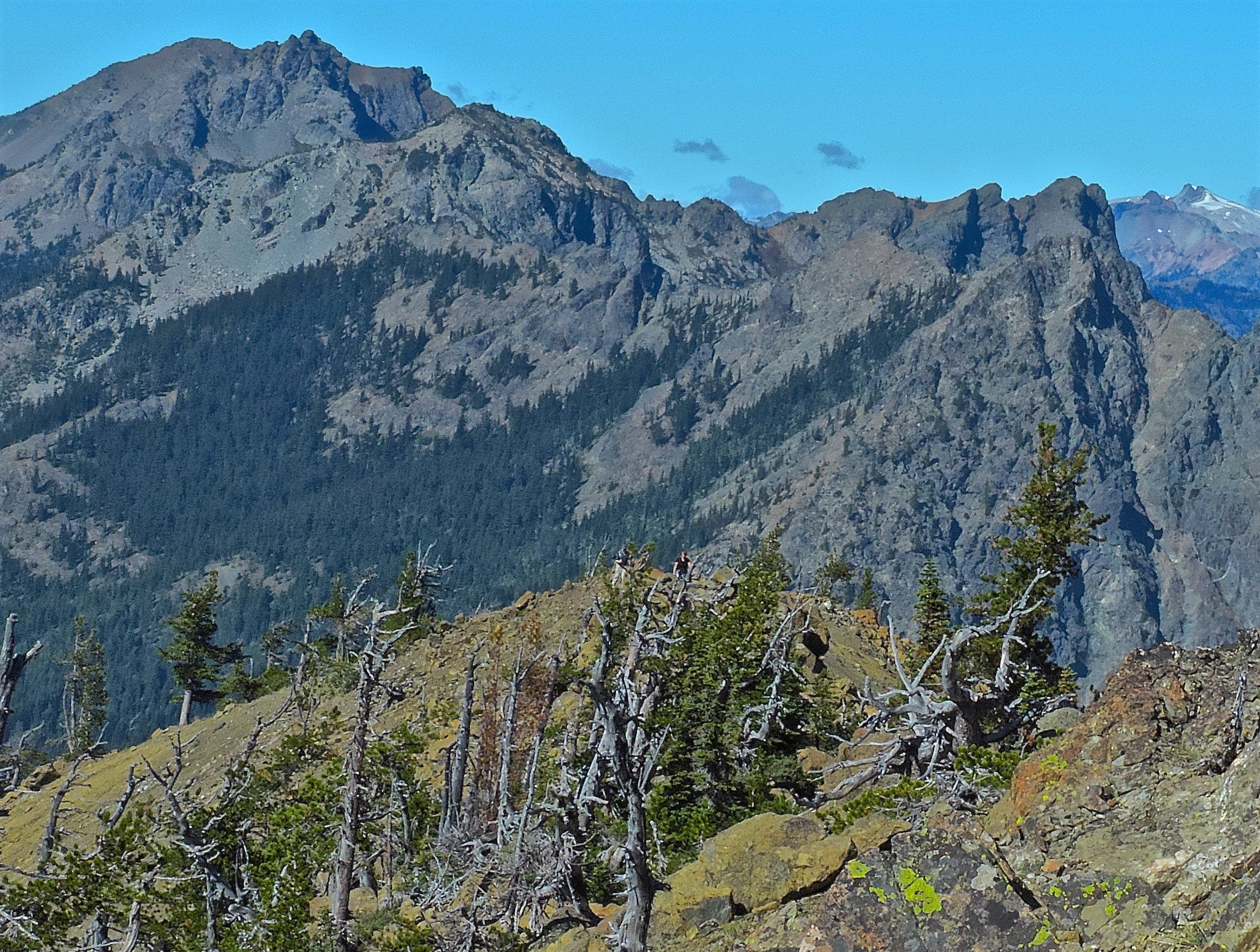
Esmeralda Peaks, with Hawkins upper left

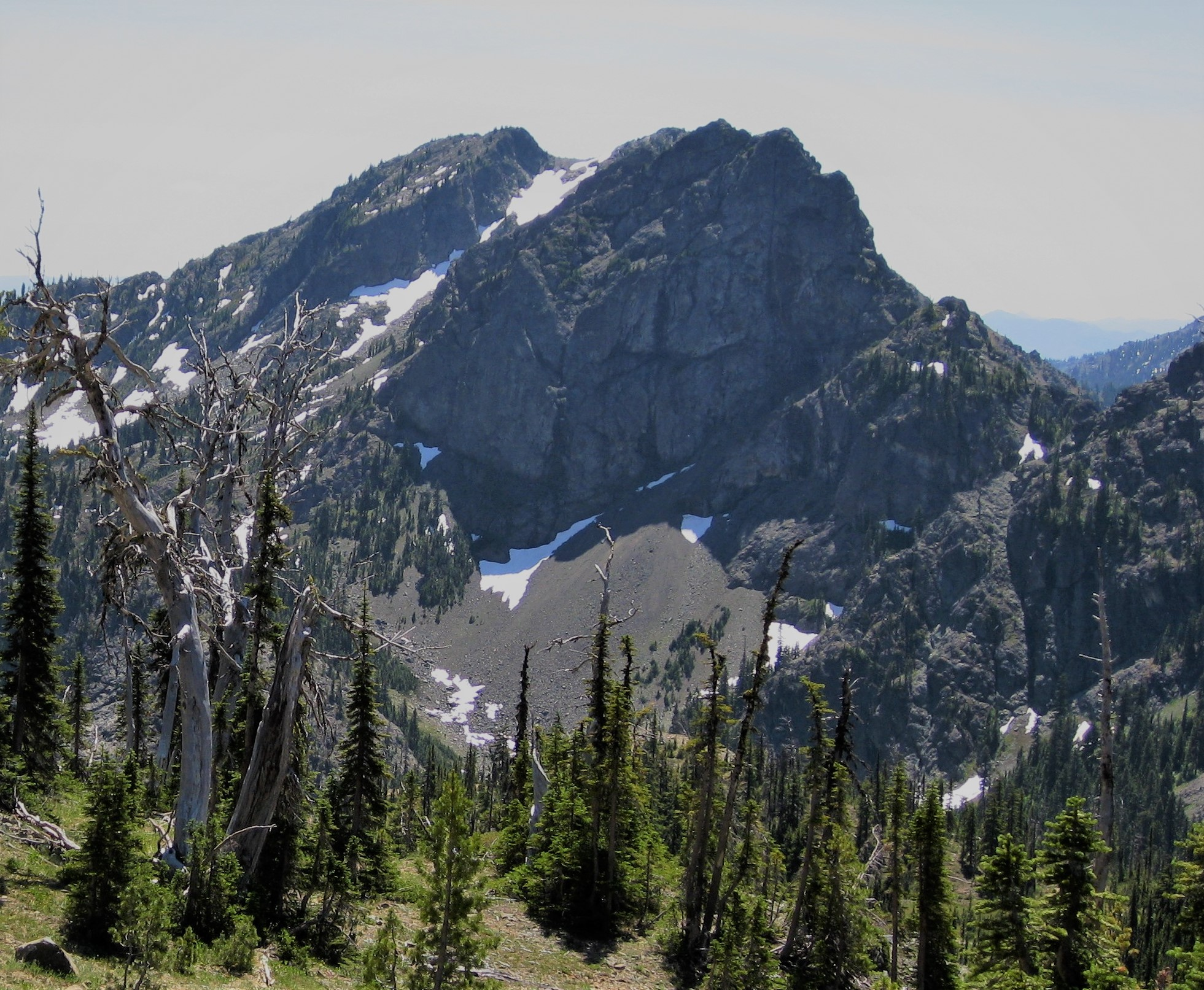
Esmeralda Peak from the north

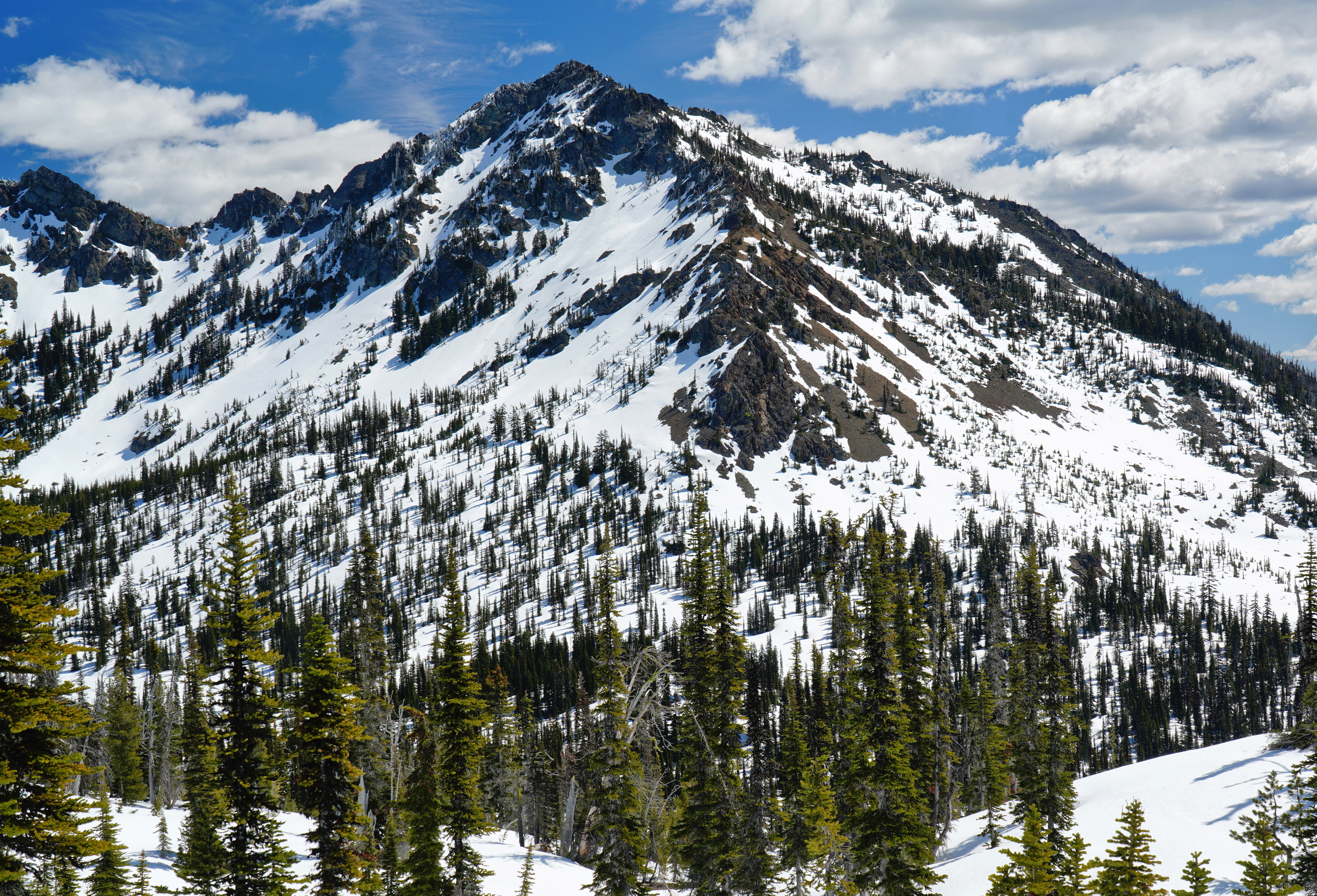
