= Fortune Peak =

Mountain in Washington (state), United States

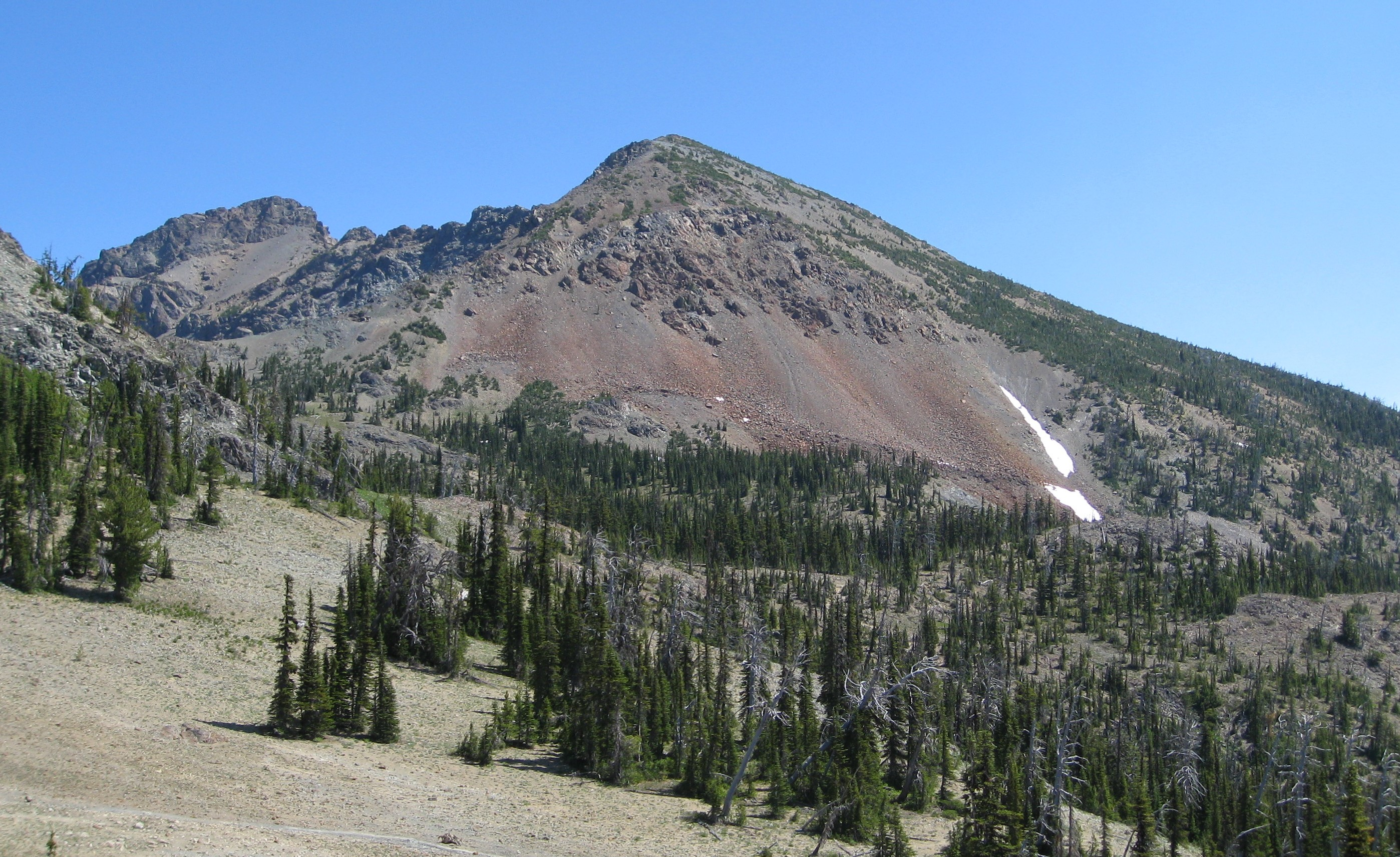
- Fortune Peak, southwest aspect

Highest point
- Elevation: 7,382 ft (2,250 m)
- Prominence: 102 ft (31 m)
- Parent peak: Ingalls Peak (7,662 ft)
- Isolation: 0.41 mi (0.66 km)
- Coordinates: 47°27′46″N 120°57′11″W

Geography
- Location within Washington (state) Location within the United States
- Country: United States
- State: Washington
- County: Chelan / Kittitas
- Protected area: Alpine Lakes Wilderness
- Parent range: Wenatchee Mountains; Cascade Range
- Topo map: USGS Mount Stuart

Geology
- Rock age: Jurassic

Climbing
- Easiest route: scrambling

Fortune Peak is a 7,382-foot (2,250-metre) mountain summit located along the common border of Kittitas County and Chelan County, in Washington state. Fortune Peak is the second-highest point in the Teanaway area of the Wenatchee Mountains. It is situated 0.74 mi (1.19 km) south-southwest of Ingalls Peak, and southwest of Lake Ingalls, on the Alpine Lakes Wilderness boundary, on land managed by Wenatchee National Forest. Precipitation runoff from the peak drains northwest into Fortune Creek, a tributary of Cle Elum River; south into tributaries of Teanaway River; or east into Ingalls Creek which is part of the Wenatchee River drainage basin. This peak is unofficially named for its position at the head of Fortune Creek. This creek was where the Queen of the Hills and Ruby Mines were located. Queen of the Hills was a lode gold mine, whereas the Ruby Mine produced antimony, copper, lead, and silver with a by-product of gold.

== Climate ==
Lying east of the Cascade crest, the area around Fortune Peak is a bit drier than areas to the west. Summers can bring warm temperatures and occasional thunderstorms. Weather fronts originating in the Pacific Ocean travel east toward the Cascade Mountains. As fronts approach, they are forced upward by the peaks of the Cascade Range, causing them to drop their moisture in the form of rain or snowfall onto the Cascades (Orographic lift). As a result, the eastern slopes of the Cascades experience lower precipitation than the western slopes. During winter months, weather is usually cloudy, but due to high pressure systems over the Pacific Ocean that intensify during summer months, there is often little or no cloud cover during the summer.

== Geology ==
The Alpine Lakes Wilderness features some of the most rugged topography in the Cascade Range with craggy peaks and ridges, deep glacial valleys, and granite walls spotted with over 700 mountain lakes. Geological events occurring many years ago created the diverse topography and drastic elevation changes over the Cascade Range leading to the various climate differences.

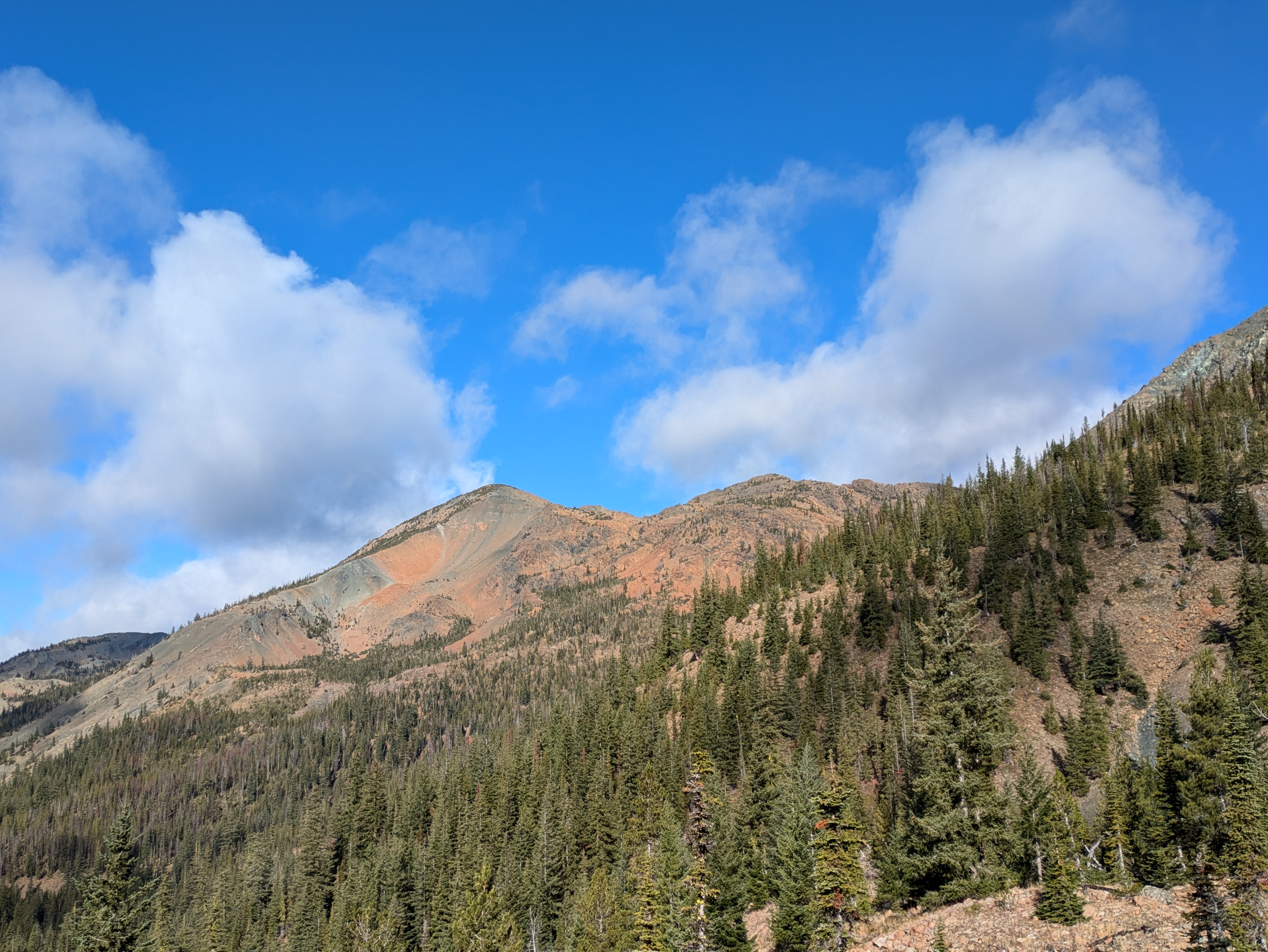
Fortune Peak from the southeast (21 October 2024)

The history of the formation of the Cascade Mountains dates back millions of years ago to the late Eocene Epoch. With the North American Plate overriding the Pacific Plate, episodes of volcanic igneous activity persisted. In addition, small fragments of the oceanic and continental lithosphere called terranes created the North Cascades about 50 million years ago.

During the Pleistocene period dating back over two million years ago, glaciation advancing and retreating repeatedly scoured the landscape leaving deposits of rock debris. The last glacial retreat in the Alpine Lakes area began about 14,000 years ago and was north of the Canada–US border by 10,000 years ago. The U-shaped cross section of the river valleys is a result of that recent glaciation. Uplift and faulting in combination with glaciation have been the dominant processes which have created the tall peaks and deep valleys of the Alpine Lakes Wilderness area.

== See also ==
- List of peaks of the Alpine Lakes Wilderness
- Geology of the Pacific Northwest
