= Ingalls Peak =

Mountain in Washington (state), United States

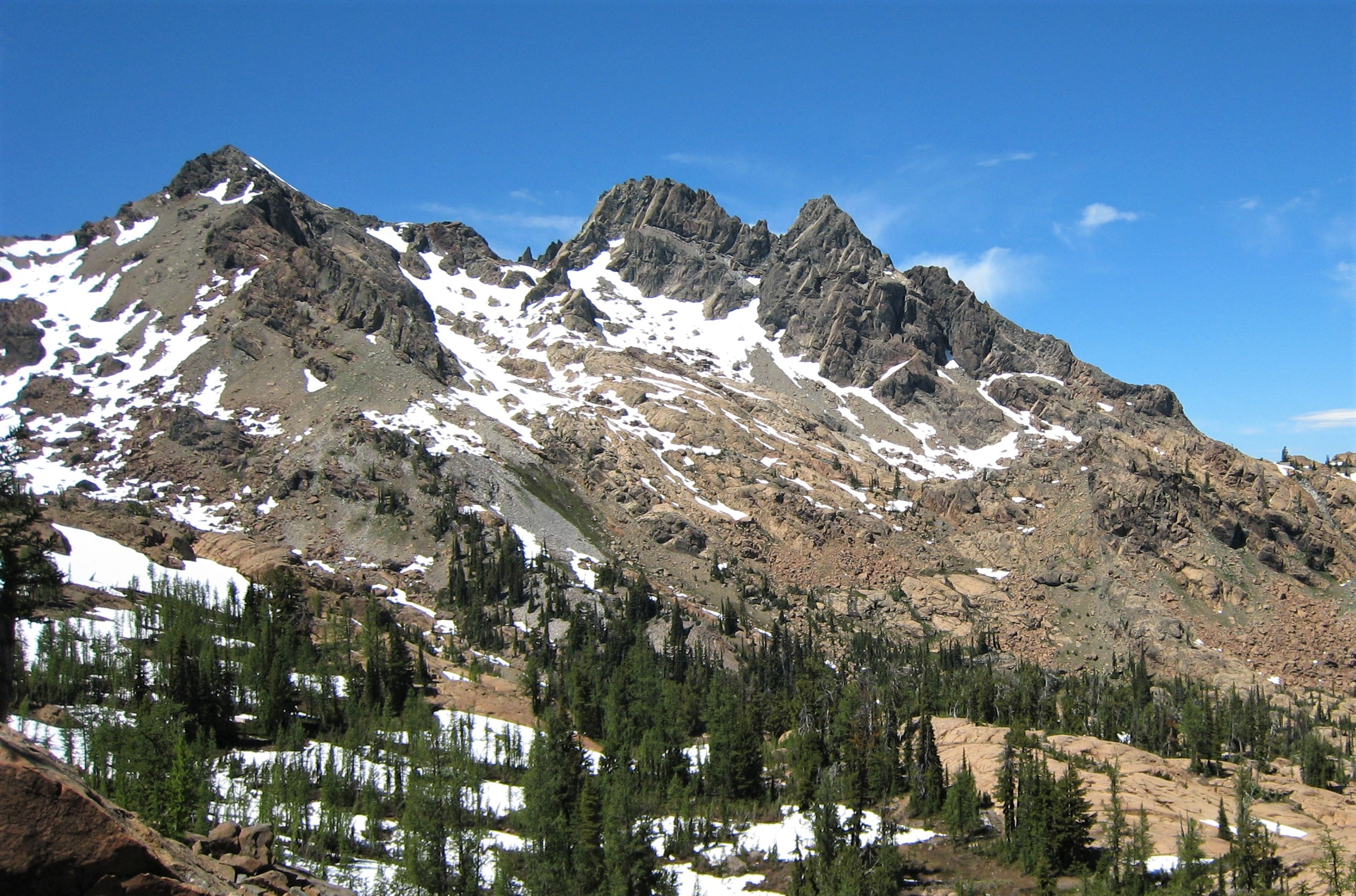
- Ingalls Peak, east aspect

Highest point
- Elevation: 7,662 ft (2,335 m)
- Prominence: 1,222 ft (372 m)
- Parent peak: Mount Stuart (9,415 ft)
- Isolation: 2.07 mi (3.33 km)
- Coordinates: 47°28′21″N 120°56′47″W

Geography
- Location within Washington (state) Location within the United States
- Country: United States
- State: Washington
- County: Chelan / Kittitas
- Protected area: Alpine Lakes Wilderness
- Parent range: Wenatchee Mountains; Cascade Range
- Topo map: USGS Mount Stuart

Geology
- Rock age: Jurassic
- Rock type: Peridotite

Climbing
- First ascent: 1925
- Easiest route: class 4 scrambling

Ingalls Peak is a 7,662-foot (2,335-metre) triple-summit mountain located in the Alpine Lakes Wilderness, along the common border of Kittitas County and Chelan County, in Washington state. Ingalls Peak is the highest point in the Teanaway area of the Wenatchee Mountains. It is situated 2 mi (3.2 km) west of Mount Stuart, and immediately west of Lake Ingalls, on land managed by Wenatchee National Forest. Its subpeaks are the South Peak (7,640 ft; 2,330 m) and the East Peak (7,480 ft; 2,280 m). Precipitation runoff from the peak drains north into Jack Creek, a tributary of Icicle Creek; west into Fortune Creek; or east into Ingalls Creek, a tributary of the Wenatchee River. This peak, the lake, creek, and pass are named for Captain Benjamin Ingalls of the United States Cavalry who led an 1855 survey of this area and is credited with discovering gold in the region.

== Climbing ==
Ingalls Peak is a popular climbing destination because of its generally sound peridotite rock and relatively easy access. The North Peak is the highest, and its easiest climbing route is rated class 4 by either the Southwest Face or East Ridge. The first ascent was made in 1925 by a party of The Mountaineers. The South Ridge is a popular route, class 5.4 rating. This route was first climbed by Keith Lankin (1921-2010) and Ken Solberg on May 30, 1941. The Southeast Face was first climbed in June 1956 by James “Lex” Alexander Maxwell (1910-2007) and Bob McCall.

The South Peak is the easiest ascent, involving only class 3 scrambling.

The East Peak is a classic horn shape, and the most difficult to reach the top, minimum class 5 climbing. This summit was first climbed by Gene Prater, Bill Prater, and Stan Butcharc in November 1952. There are established routes on the South Face, Southwest Face, and Dike Chimney - East Ridge.

== Climate ==
Lying east of the Cascade crest, the area around Ingalls Peak is a bit drier than areas to the west. Summers can bring warm temperatures and occasional thunderstorms. Weather fronts originating in the Pacific Ocean travel east toward the Cascade Mountains. As fronts approach, they are forced upward by the peaks of the Cascade Range, causing them to drop their moisture in the form of rain or snow onto the Cascades (Orographic lift). As a result, the western slopes of the Cascades experience high precipitation, especially during the winter months in the form of snowfall. During winter months, weather is usually cloudy, but due to high pressure systems over the Pacific Ocean that intensify during summer months, there is often little or no cloud cover during the summer.

== Geology ==
The Alpine Lakes Wilderness features some of the most rugged topography in the Cascade Range with craggy peaks and ridges, deep glacial valleys, and granite walls spotted with over 700 mountain lakes. Geological events occurring many years ago created the diverse topography and drastic elevation changes over the Cascade Range leading to the various climate differences.

The history of the formation of the Cascade Mountains dates back millions of years ago to the late Eocene Epoch. With the North American Plate overriding the Pacific Plate, episodes of volcanic igneous activity persisted. In addition, small fragments of the oceanic and continental lithosphere called terranes created the North Cascades about 50 million years ago.

During the Pleistocene period dating back over two million years ago, glaciation advancing and retreating repeatedly scoured the landscape leaving deposits of rock debris. The last glacial retreat in the Alpine Lakes area began about 14,000 years ago and was north of the Canada–US border by 10,000 years ago. The U-shaped cross section of the river valleys is a result of that recent glaciation. Uplift and faulting in combination with glaciation have been the dominant processes which have created the tall peaks and deep valleys of the Alpine Lakes Wilderness area.

== Gallery ==
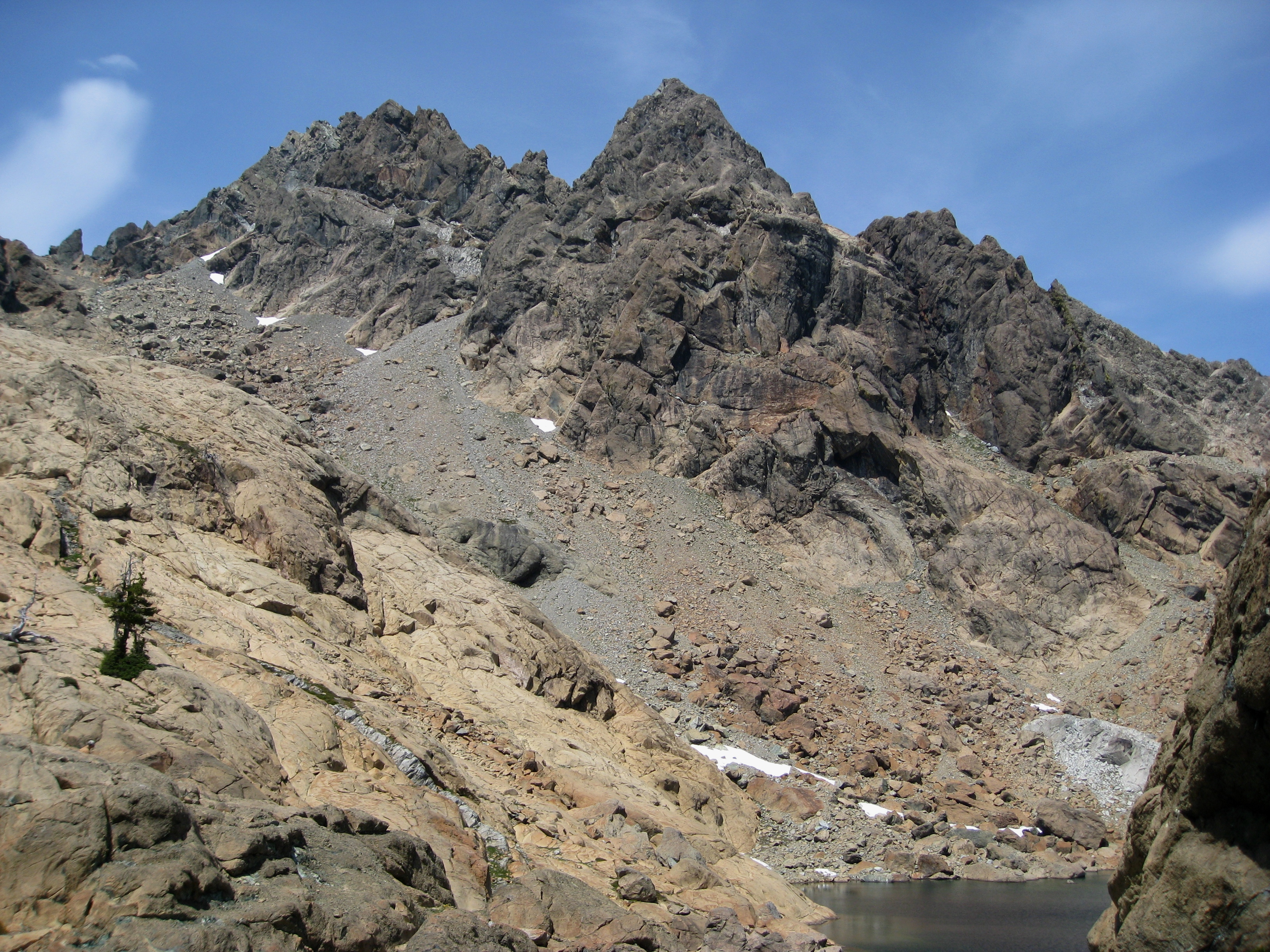
East Peak centered (North Peak left)

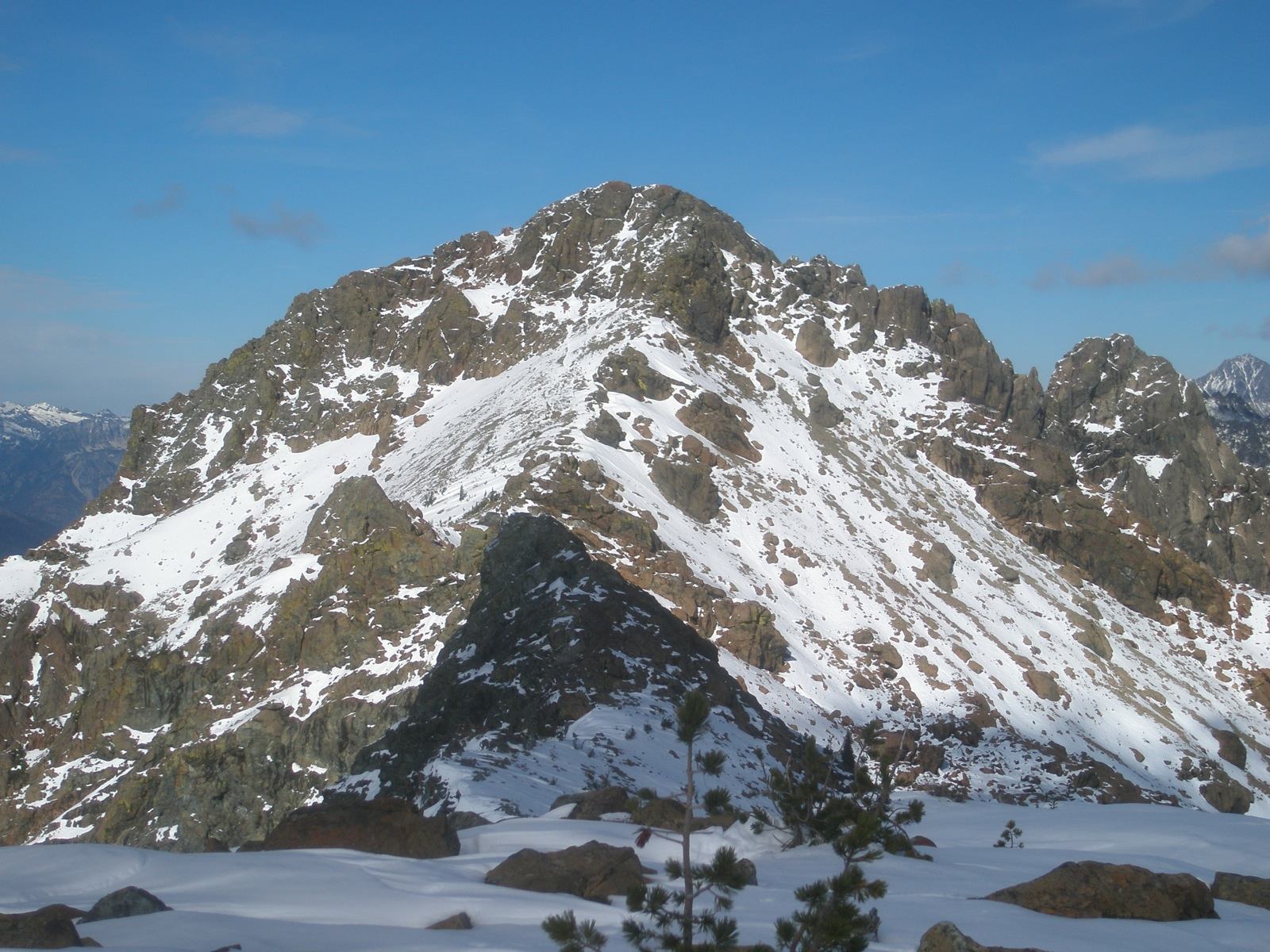
South Peak from SSW on Fortune Peak

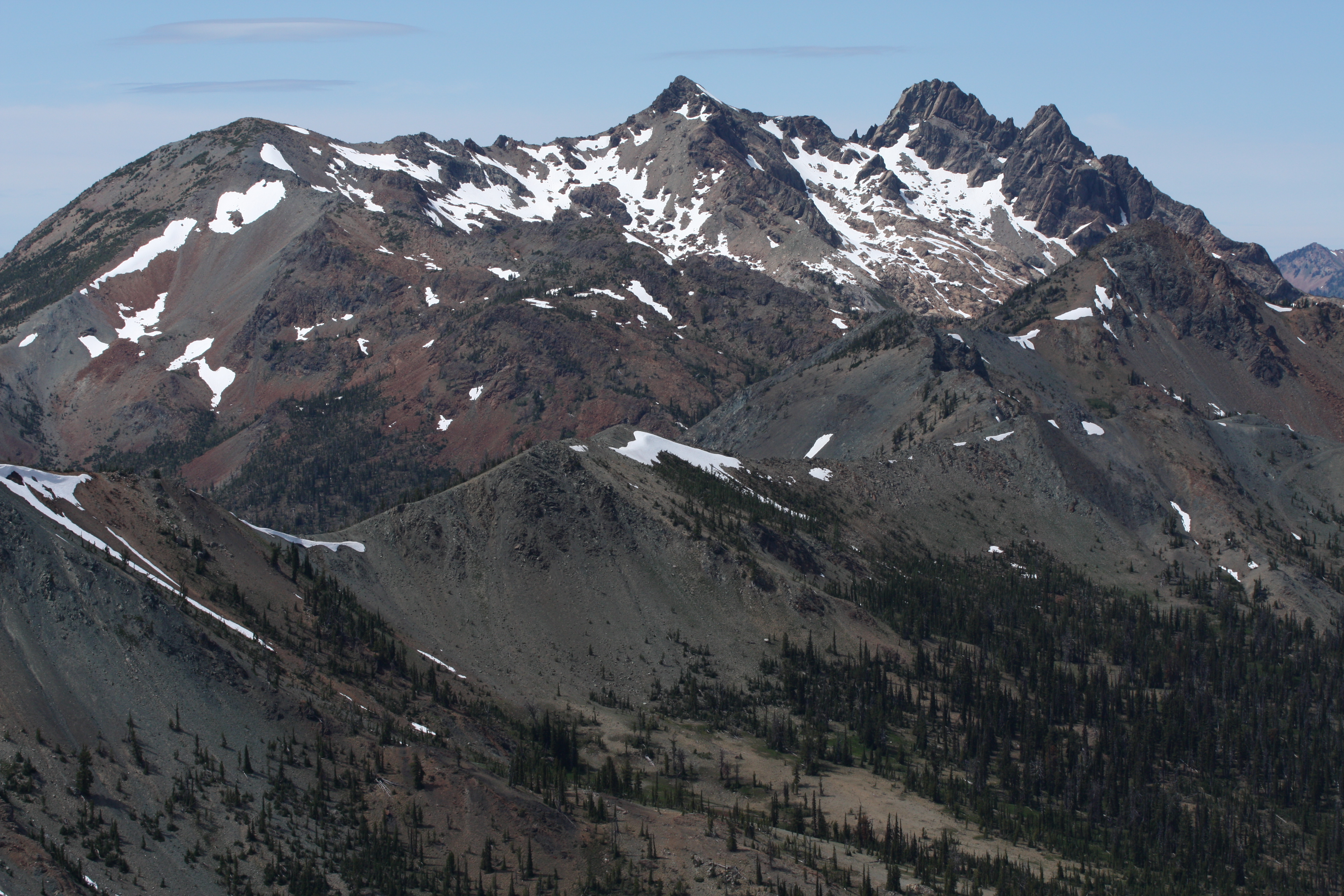
From the southeast

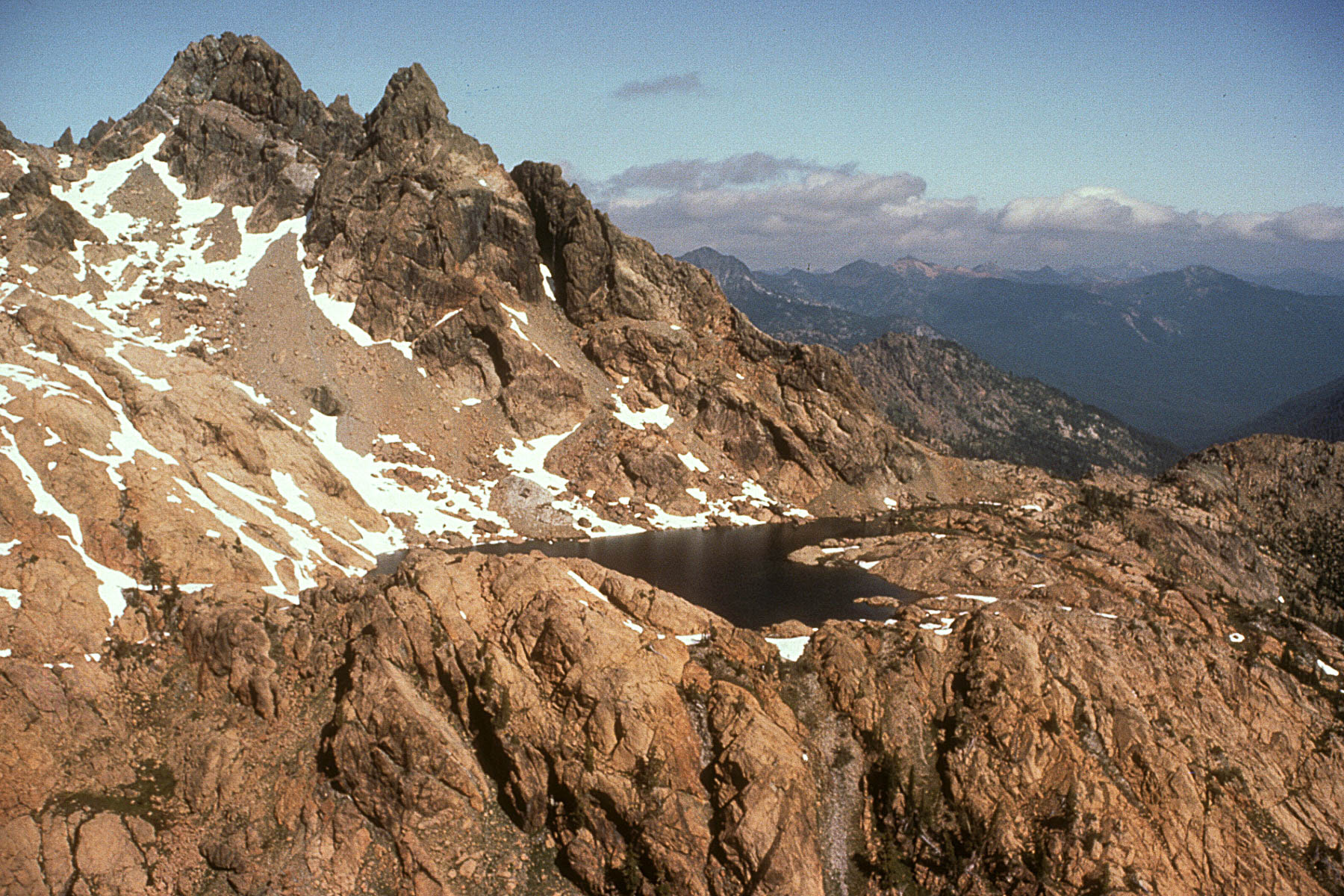
Ingalls Peak and Lake Ingalls

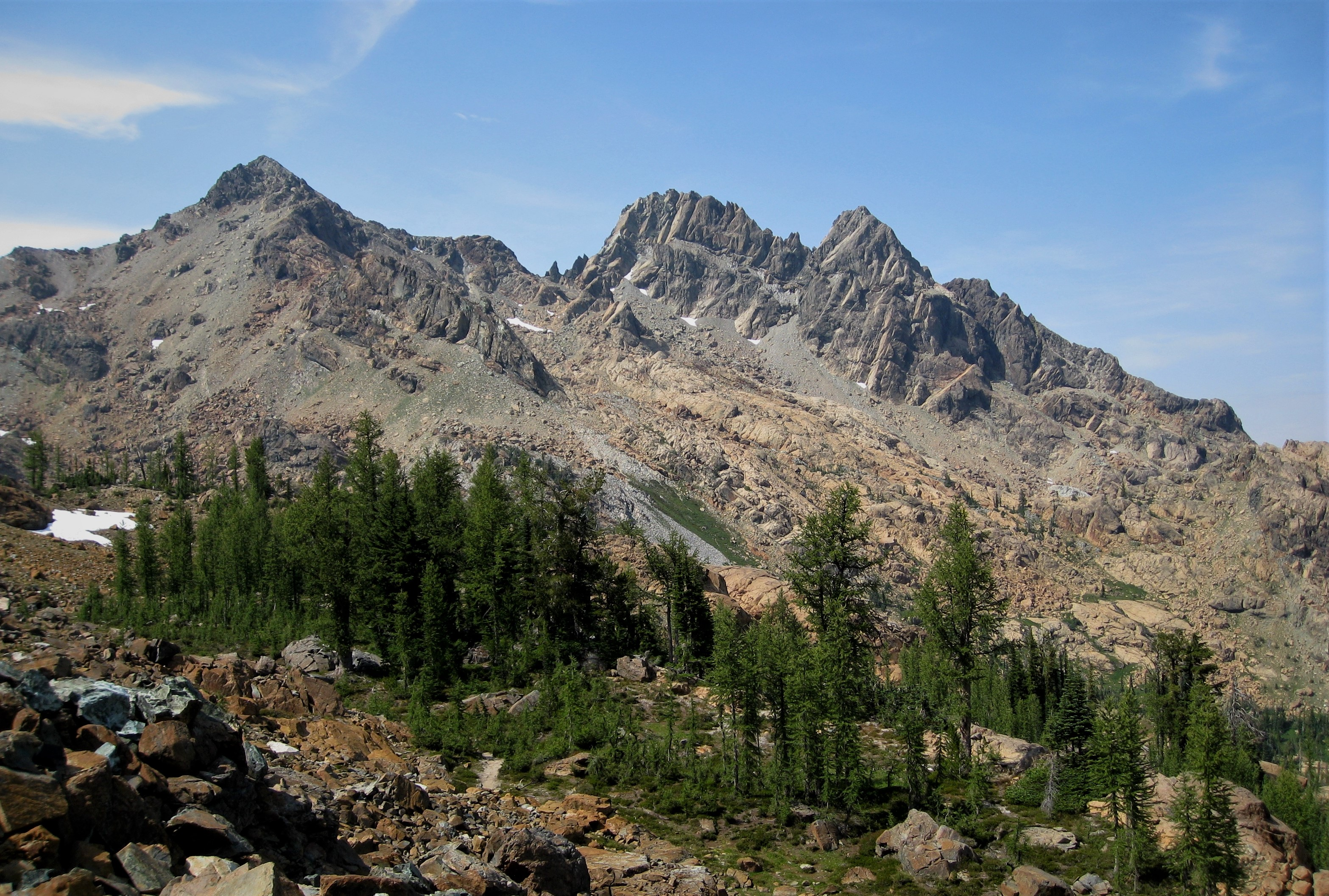
Ingalls Peak

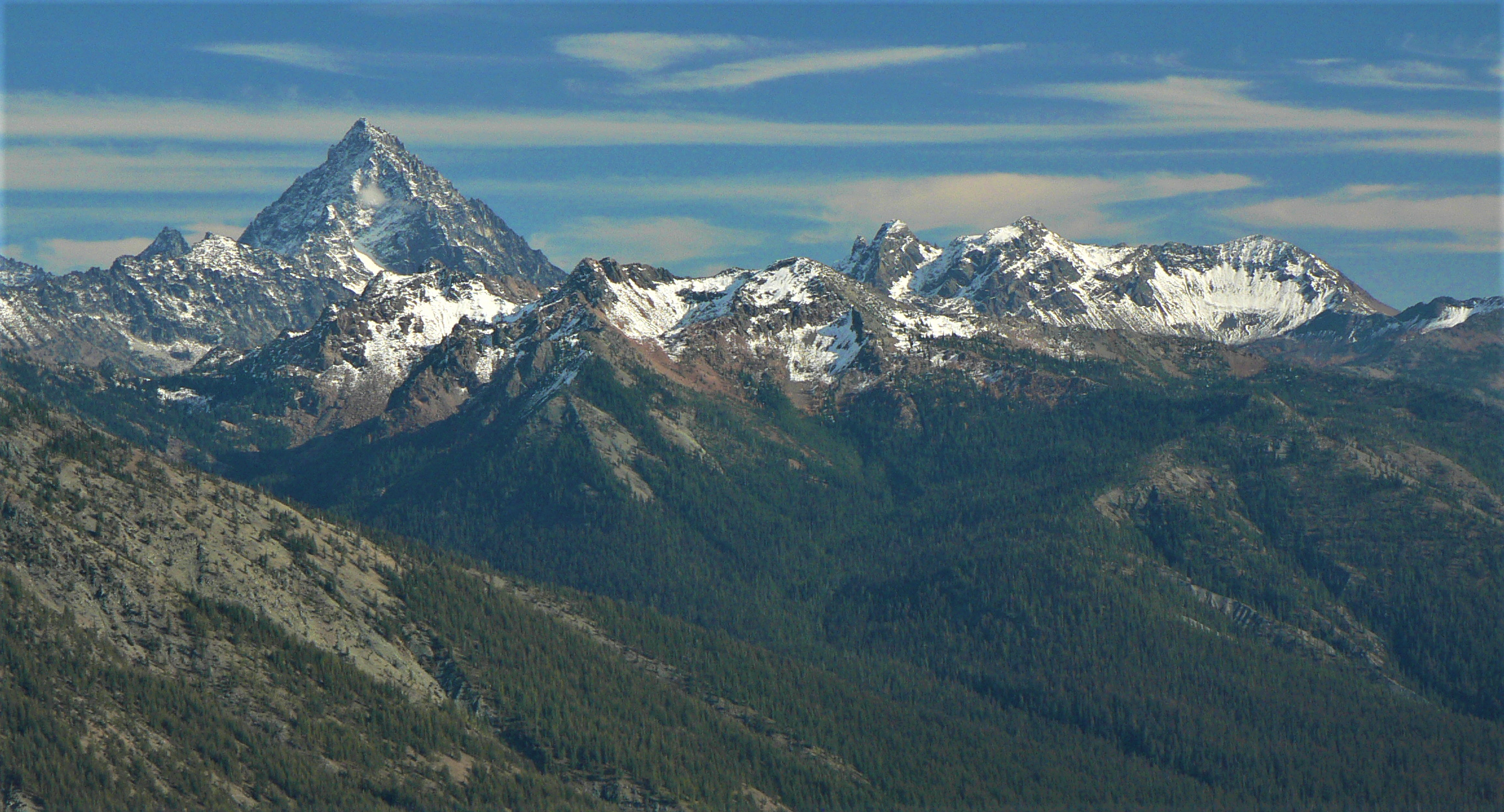
Mt. Stuart, Scatter Peak, Ingalls Peak (right of center) from northwest

== See also ==
- List of peaks of the Alpine Lakes Wilderness
- Geology of the Pacific Northwest
