= Assembly Hall Peak =

Mountain in Emery County, Utah, United States

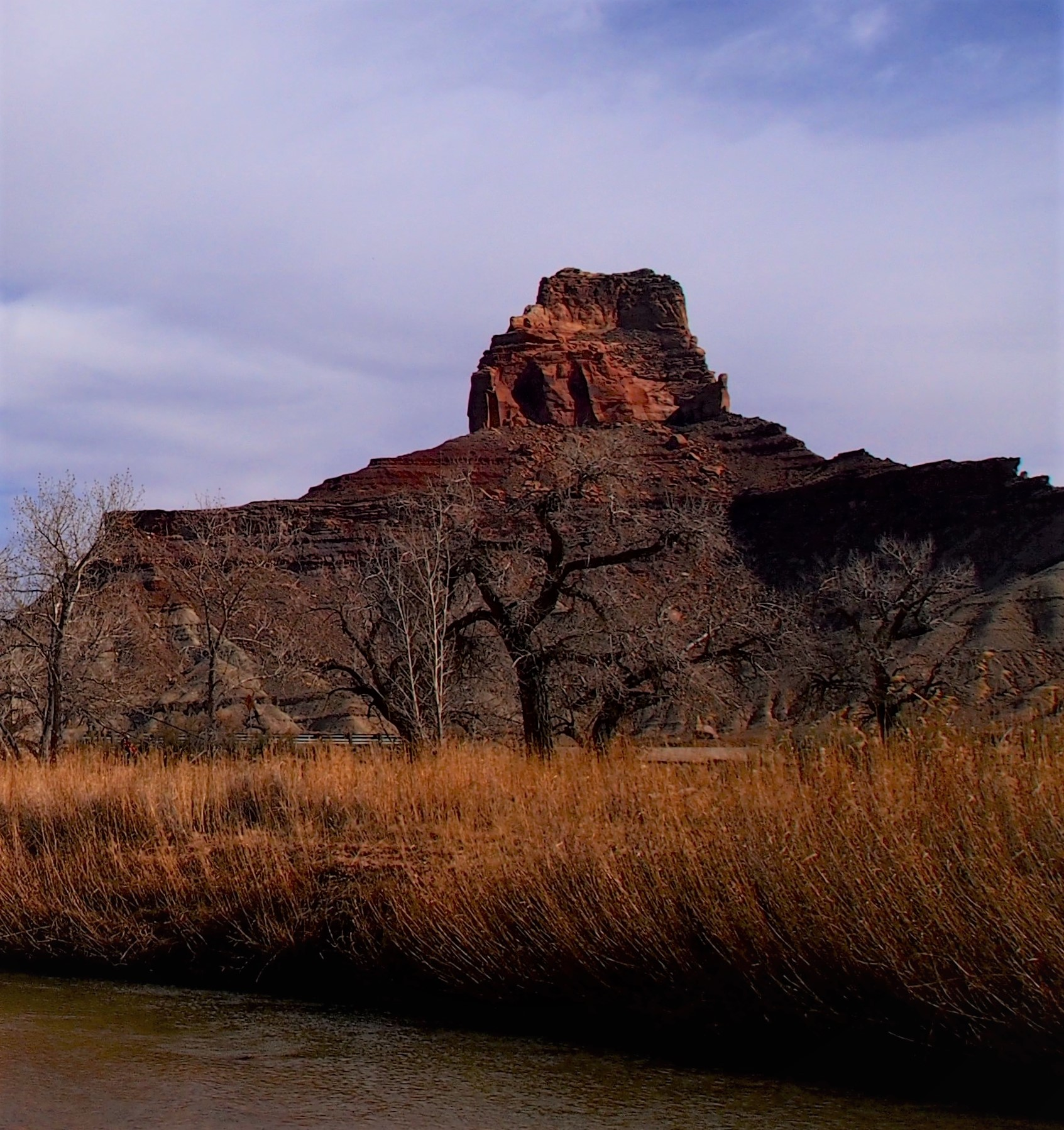
- Northwest aspect

Highest point
- Elevation: 6,395 ft (1,949 m)
- Prominence: 1,055 ft (322 m)
- Parent peak: Window Blind Peak (7,030 ft)
- Isolation: 1.54 mi (2.48 km)
- Coordinates: 39°04′04″N 110°39′30″W

Geography
- Location within Utah Location within the United States
- Country: United States
- State: Utah
- County: Emery
- Protected area: Mexican Mountain Wilderness
- Parent range: San Rafael Swell; Colorado Plateau
- Topo map: USGS Bottleneck Peak

Geology
- Rock age: Late Triassic to Jurassic
- Rock type: Wingate Sandstone

Climbing
- Easiest route: class 5.10 climbing

Assembly Hall Peak is a 6,395-foot-elevation (1,949-meter) summit in Emery County, Utah, United States.

== Description ==
Assembly Hall Peak is part of the San Rafael Swell and is located in the Mexican Mountain Wilderness Area which is administered by the Bureau of Land Management. Towering nearly 1,300 feet above the surrounding terrain, it is situated 1.66 miles (2.67 km) east-northeast of Bottleneck Peak and 1.52 miles (2.45 km) north of Window Blind Peak, which is the nearest higher neighbor. Precipitation runoff from the peak drains into the nearby San Rafael River. Topographic relief is significant as the summit rises nearly 1,300 feet (396 meters) above the river in 0.75 mile (1.2 km). Access to the mountain is via the Buckhorn Draw Road at Buckhorn Draw Campground. This mountain's toponym has been officially adopted by the U.S. Board on Geographic Names.

== Geology ==
This erosional remnant along the San Rafael River is composed of Wingate Sandstone, which is the remains of wind-borne sand dunes deposited approximately 200 million years ago in the Late Triassic. The Wingate overlays lightly colored Chinle Formation around the lower slopes of the peak and the surrounding area is composed of Moenkopi Formation.

== Climate ==
According to the Köppen climate classification system, it is located in a Cold semi-arid climate zone, which is defined by the coldest month having an average mean temperature below 32 °F (0 °C), and at least 50% of the total annual precipitation being received during the spring and summer. This desert climate receives less than 10 inches (250 millimeters) of annual rainfall, and snowfall is generally light during the winter. Spring and fall are the most favorable seasons to visit Assembly Hall Peak.

== Climbing ==
Established climbing routes:

- Postcard of the Hanging – class 5.10
- Heavy Metal – class 5.10
- Leaning Pillar – class 5.10
- Lactic Stackidosis – class 5.10+

== Gallery ==
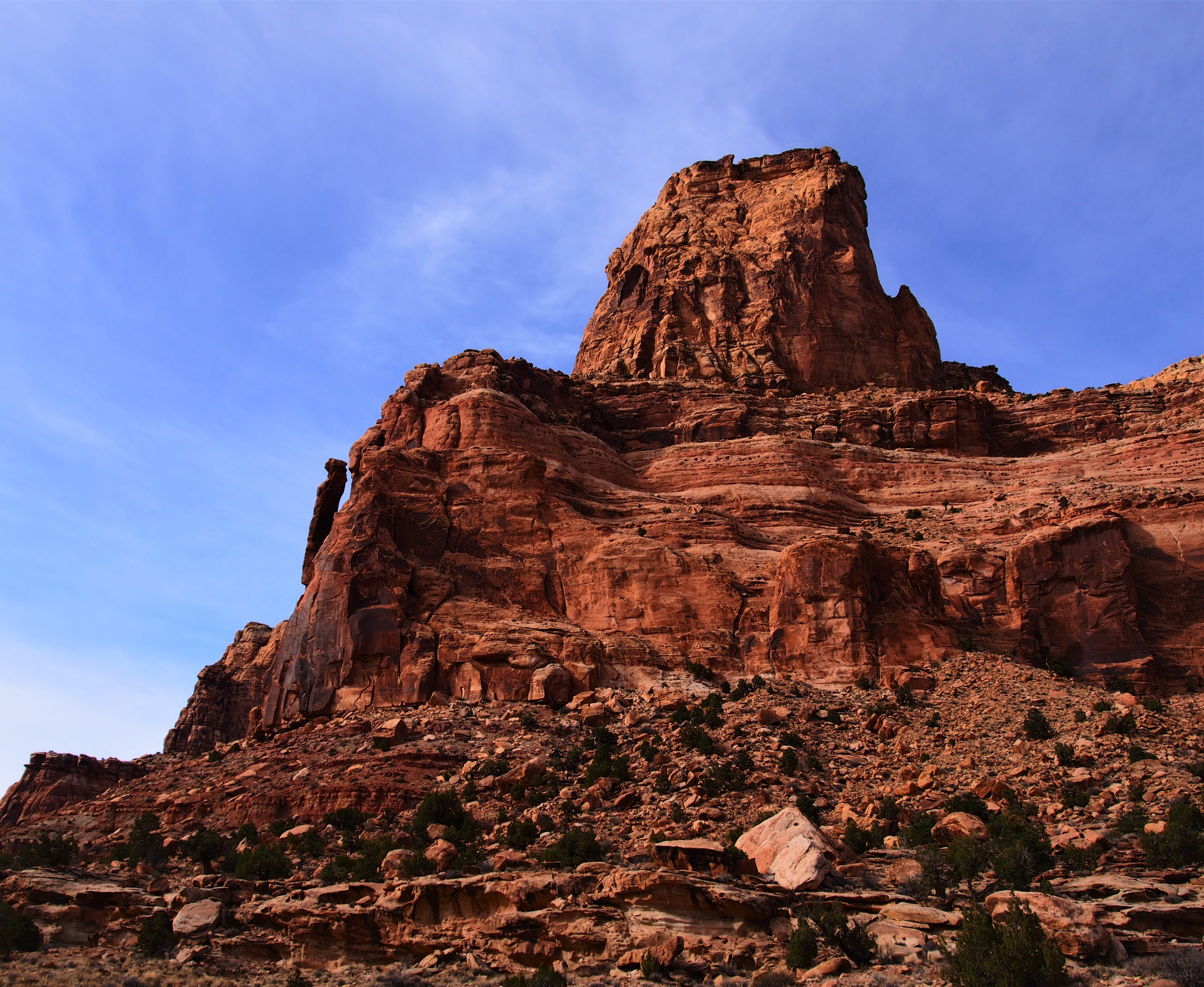

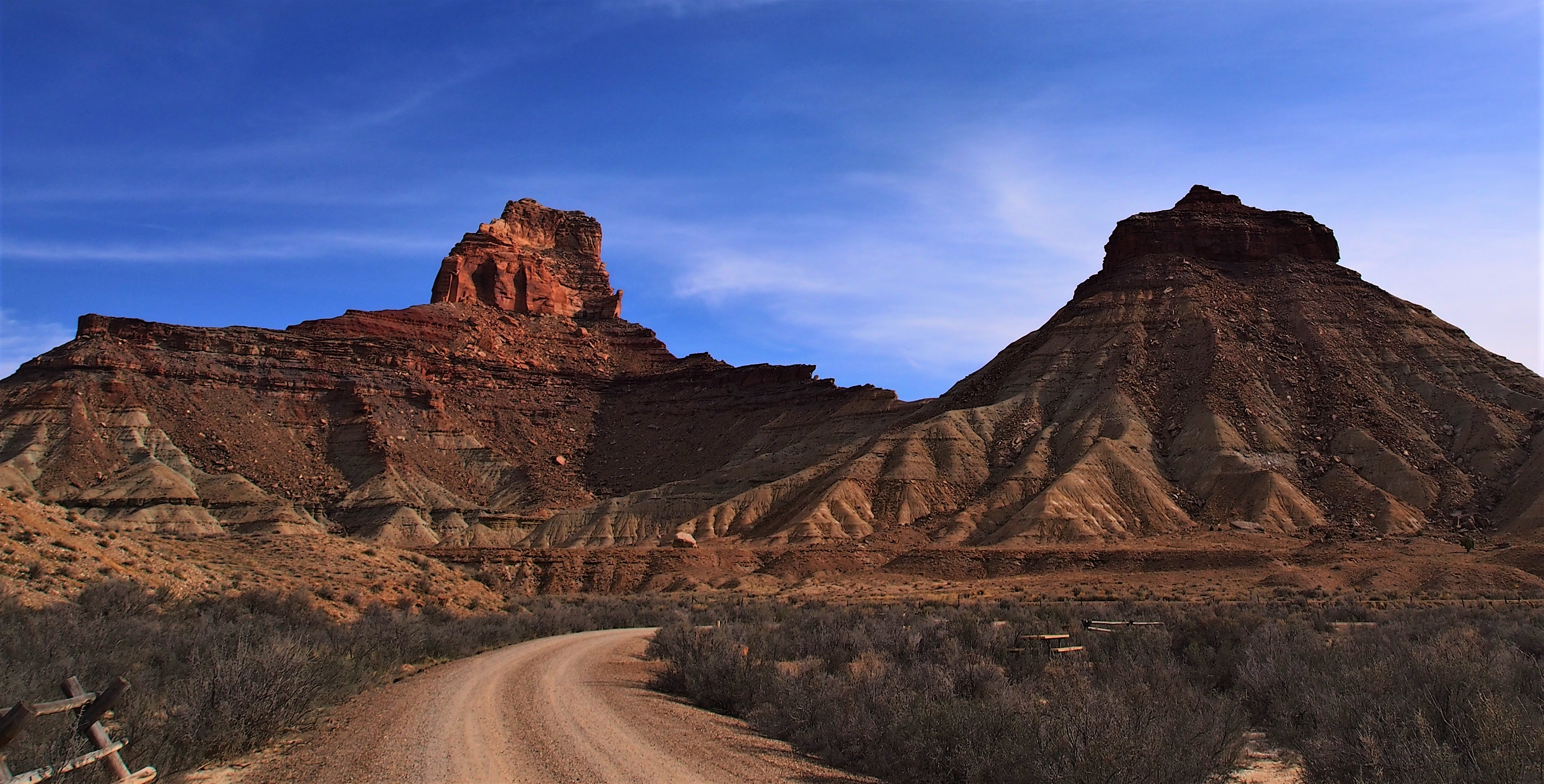
Northwest aspect of Assembly Hall Peak (left) and Peak 5740 (right)

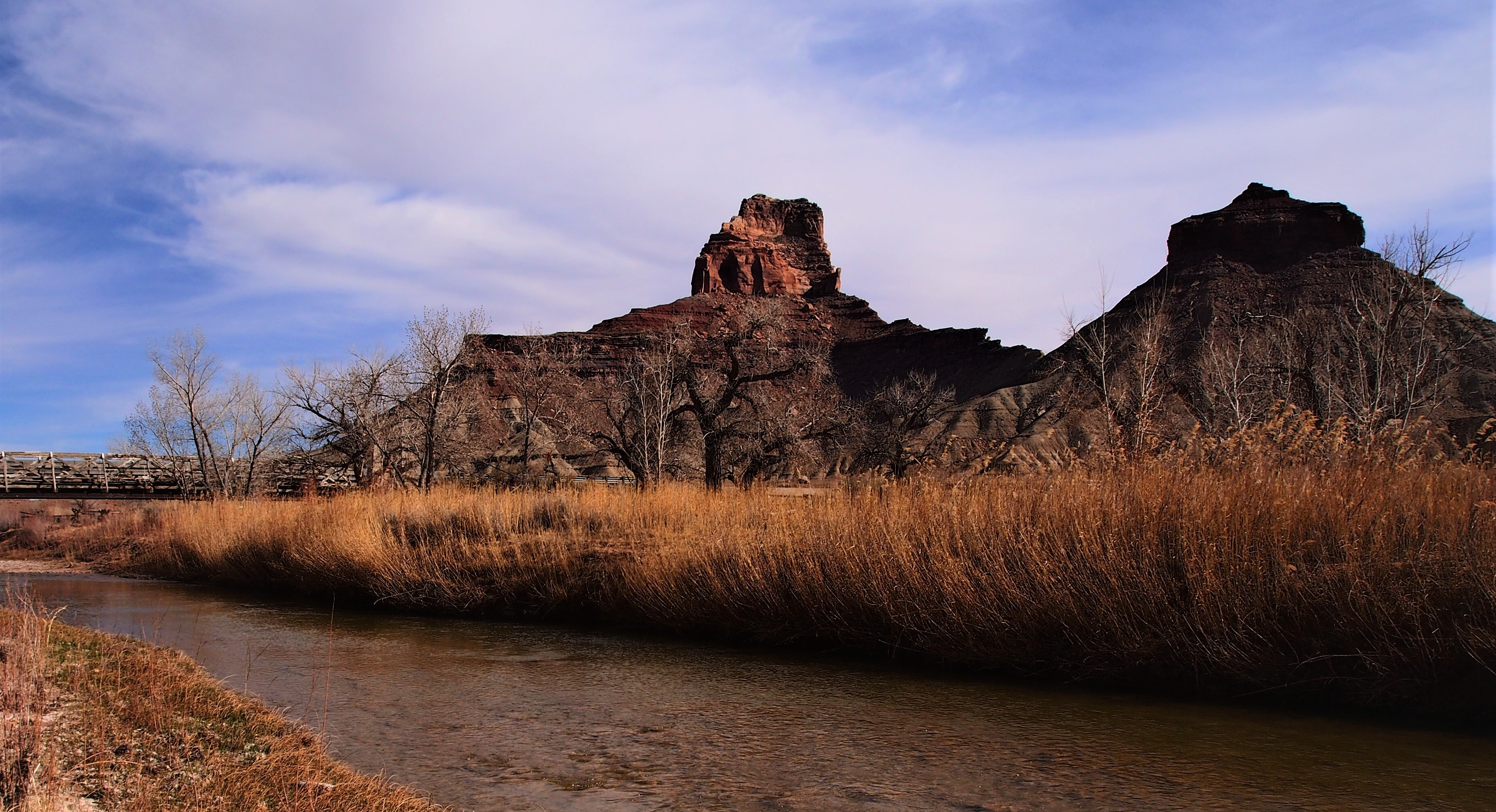
Northwest aspect of Assembly Hall Peak (center) viewed with San Rafael River

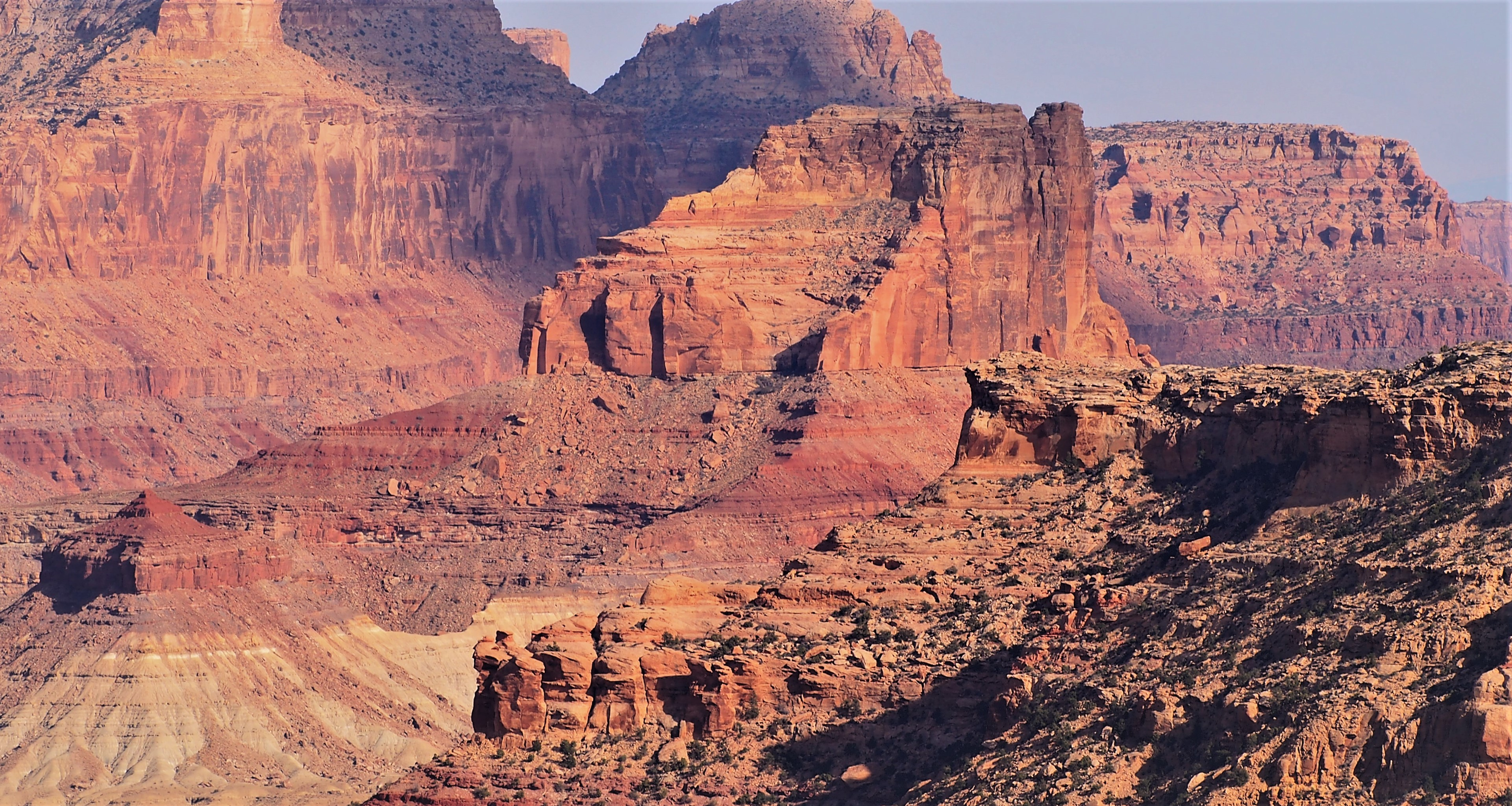
Southwest aspect

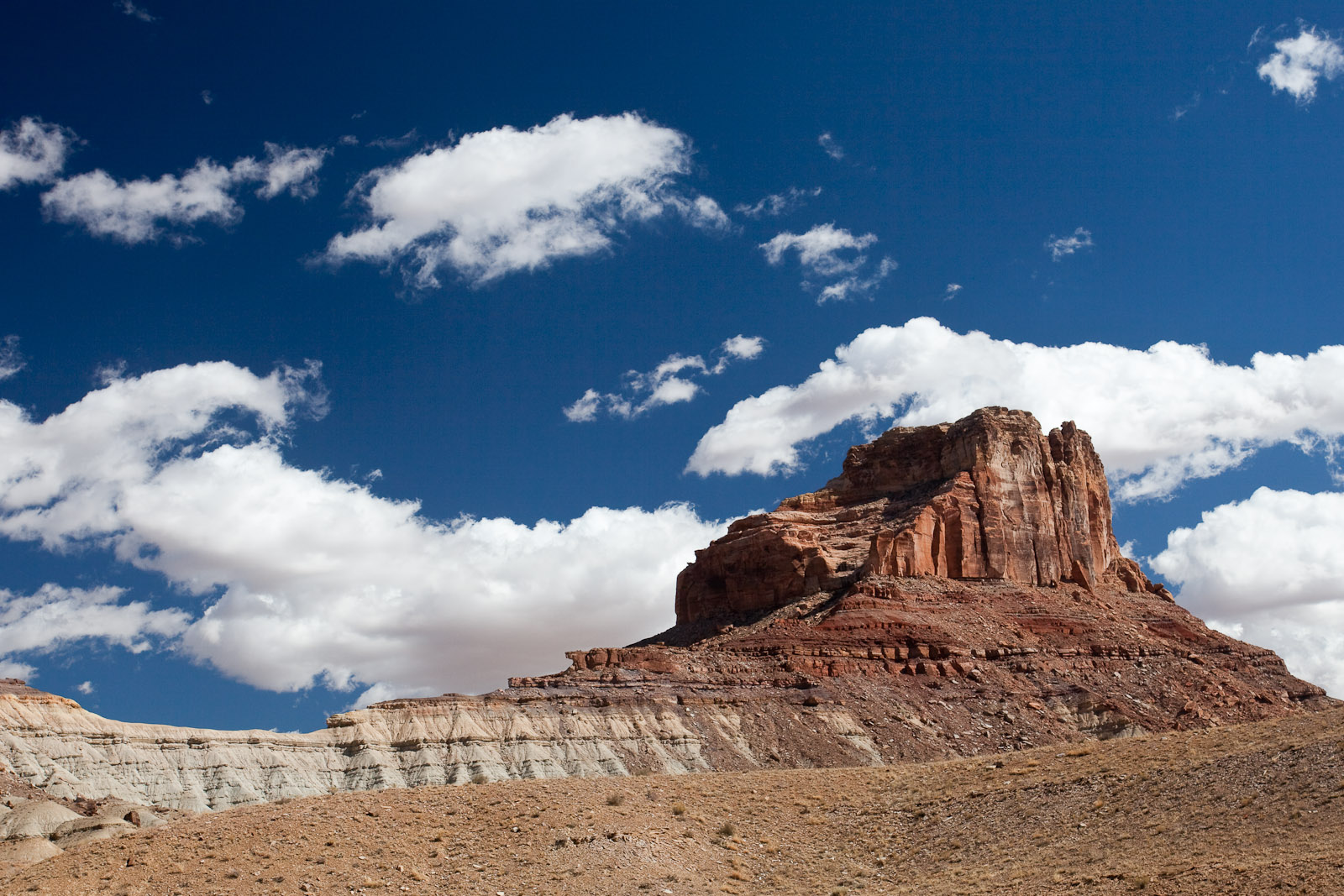
Southwest aspect

== See also ==
- Colorado Plateau
- List of mountains in Utah
