= Window Blind Peak =

Mountain in Utah, United States

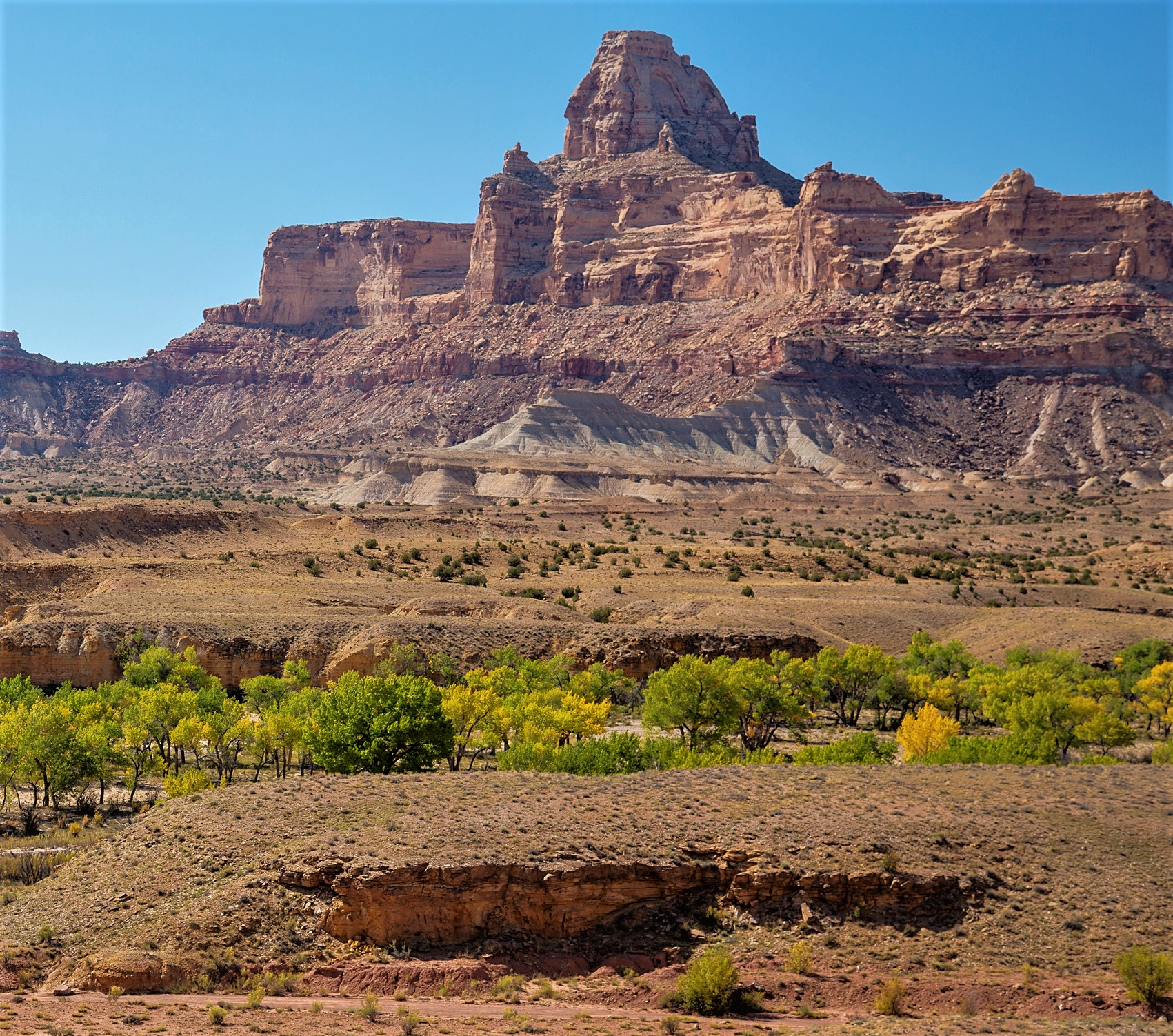
- Northeast aspect

Highest point
- Elevation: 7,030 ft (2,143 m)
- Prominence: 1,410 ft (430 m)
- Parent peak: Cedar Mountain (7,665 ft)
- Isolation: 8.99 mi (14.47 km)
- Coordinates: 39°02′41″N 110°39′23″W

Geography
- Location within Utah Location within the United States
- Country: United States
- State: Utah
- County: Emery
- Protected area: Mexican Mountain Wilderness
- Parent range: San Rafael Swell; Colorado Plateau
- Topo map: USGS Bottleneck Peak

Geology
- Rock age: Late Triassic to Jurassic
- Rock type(s): sandstone, siltstone, shale

Climbing
- First ascent: 1973
- Easiest route: class 5.7 climbing

Window Blind Peak is a 7,030-foot-elevation (2,143-meter) summit located in the San Rafael Swell of Emery County, Utah, U.S. Towering 1,800 feet above its surrounding terrain, it is the highest point of the Mexican Mountain Wilderness Study Area. Ownership is administered by the Bureau of Land Management. It is situated 2.1 miles (3.4 km) southeast of Bottleneck Peak, 1.52 miles (2.45 km) south of Assembly Hall Peak, and the nearest higher neighbor is Cedar Mountain, 8.95 miles (14.40 km) to the north-northeast. Precipitation runoff from this feature drains north into the nearby San Rafael River. The first ascent of this peak was made September 23, 1973, by Jim Langdon, Dale Black, and Dave Palmer via the West Face.

== Geology ==
This major erosional remnant along the San Rafael River is composed of Wingate Sandstone, which is the remains of wind-borne sand dunes deposited approximately 200 million years ago in the Late Triassic, overlain by Kayenta Formation, and capped by Jurassic Navajo Sandstone. Lightly-colored slopes of Chinle Formation are exposed in places around the base of the mountain.

== Climate ==
Spring and fall are the most favorable seasons to visit Window Blind Peak. According to the Köppen climate classification system, it is located in a Cold semi-arid climate zone, which is defined by the coldest month having an average mean temperature below 32 °F (0 °C), and at least 50% of the total annual precipitation being received during the spring and summer. This desert climate receives less than 10 inches (250 millimeters) of annual rainfall, and snowfall is generally light during the winter.

== See also ==
- Geology of Utah
- Colorado Plateau

== Gallery ==
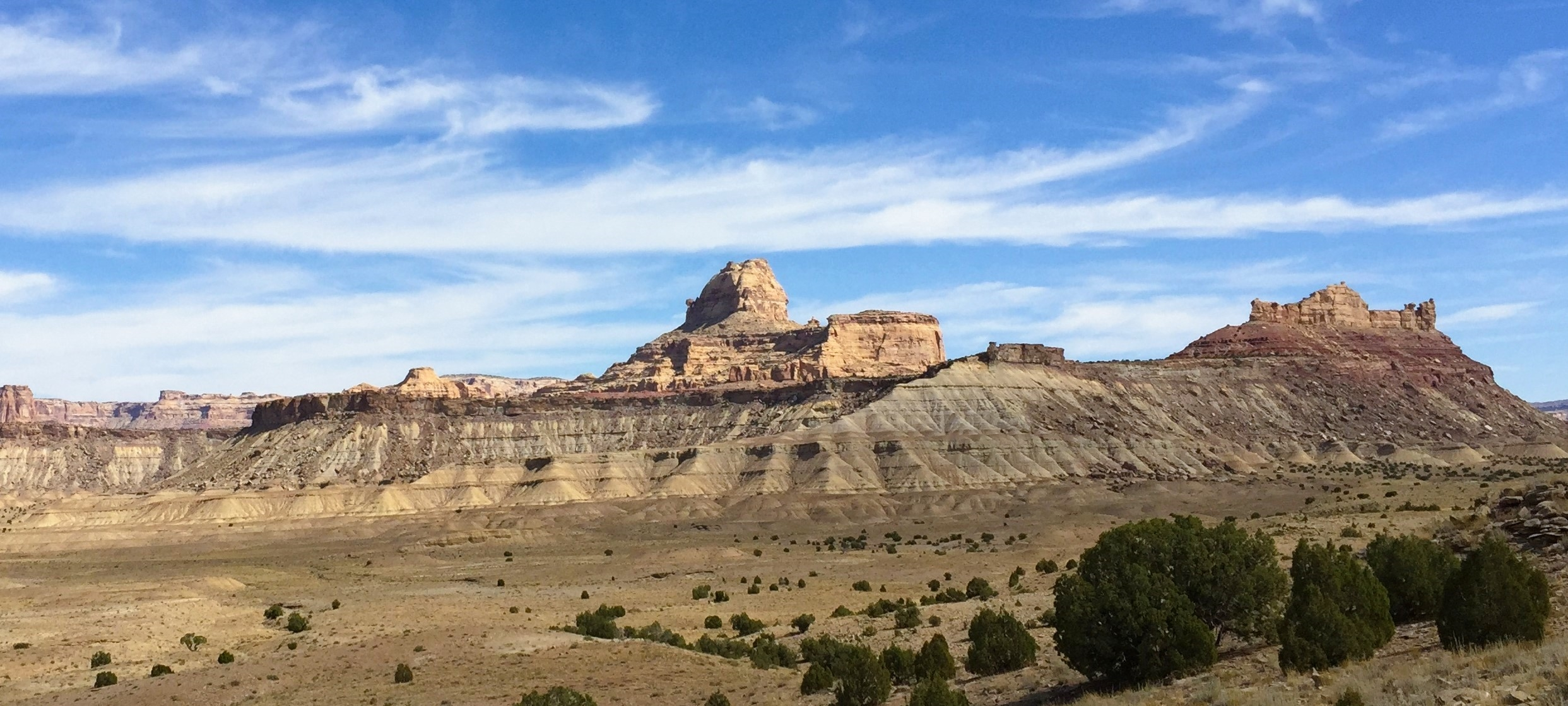
Southwest aspect centered. Viewed from Buckhorn Draw Road

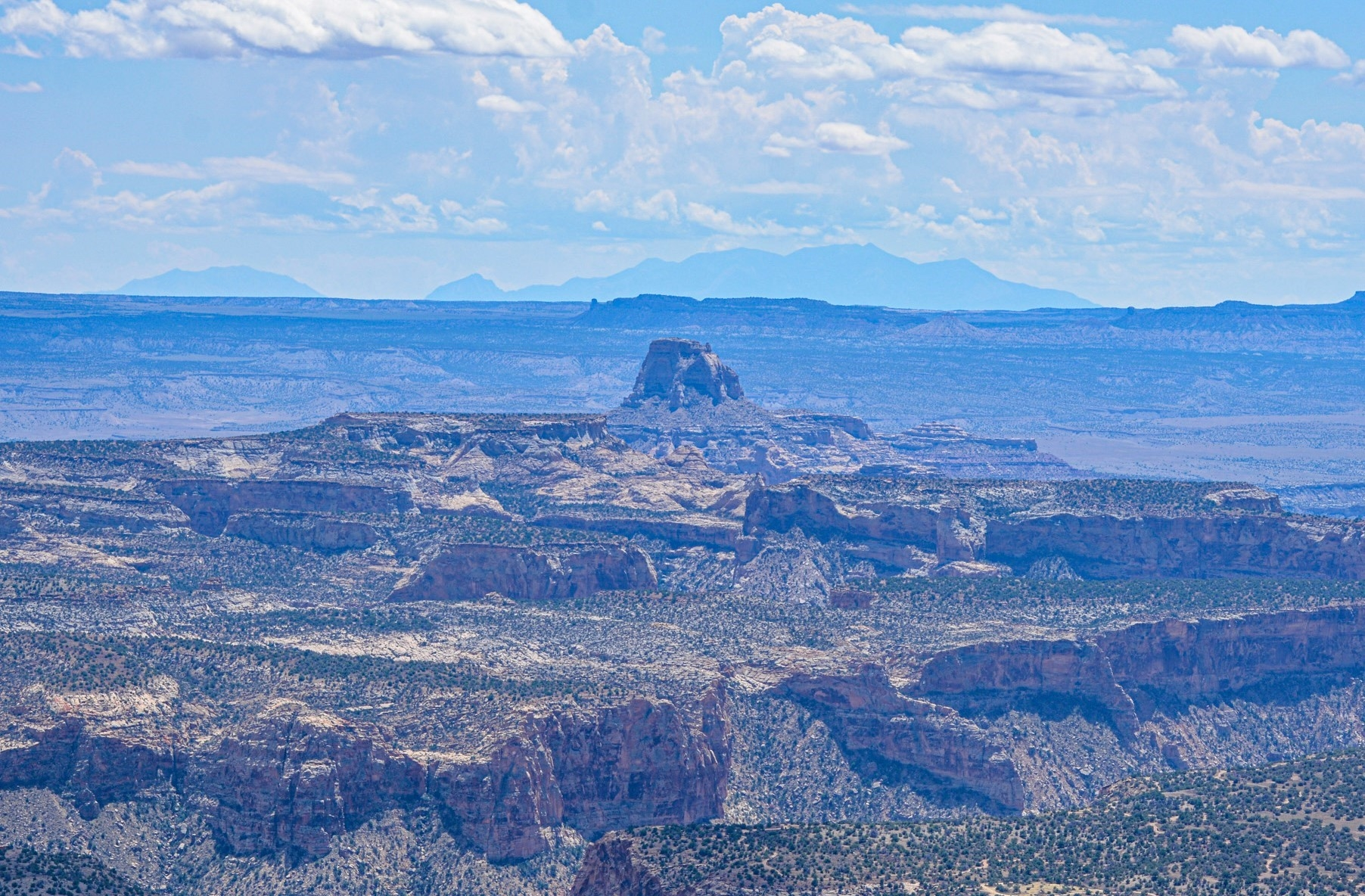
North aspect of Window Blind Peak (centered) viewed from the Cedar Mountain Overlook.

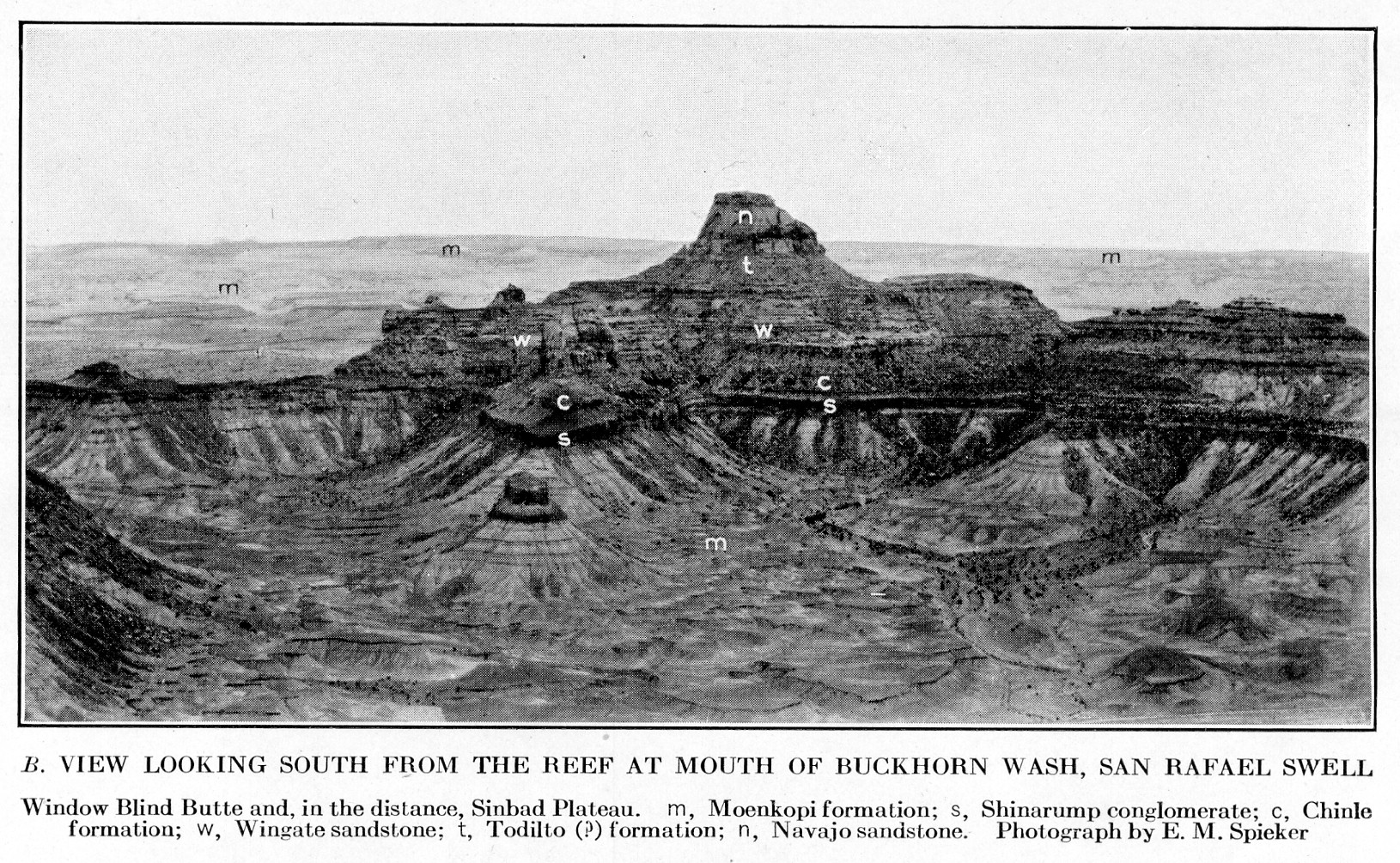
Window Blind Peak geology
