= Bottleneck Peak =

Mountain in Utah, United States

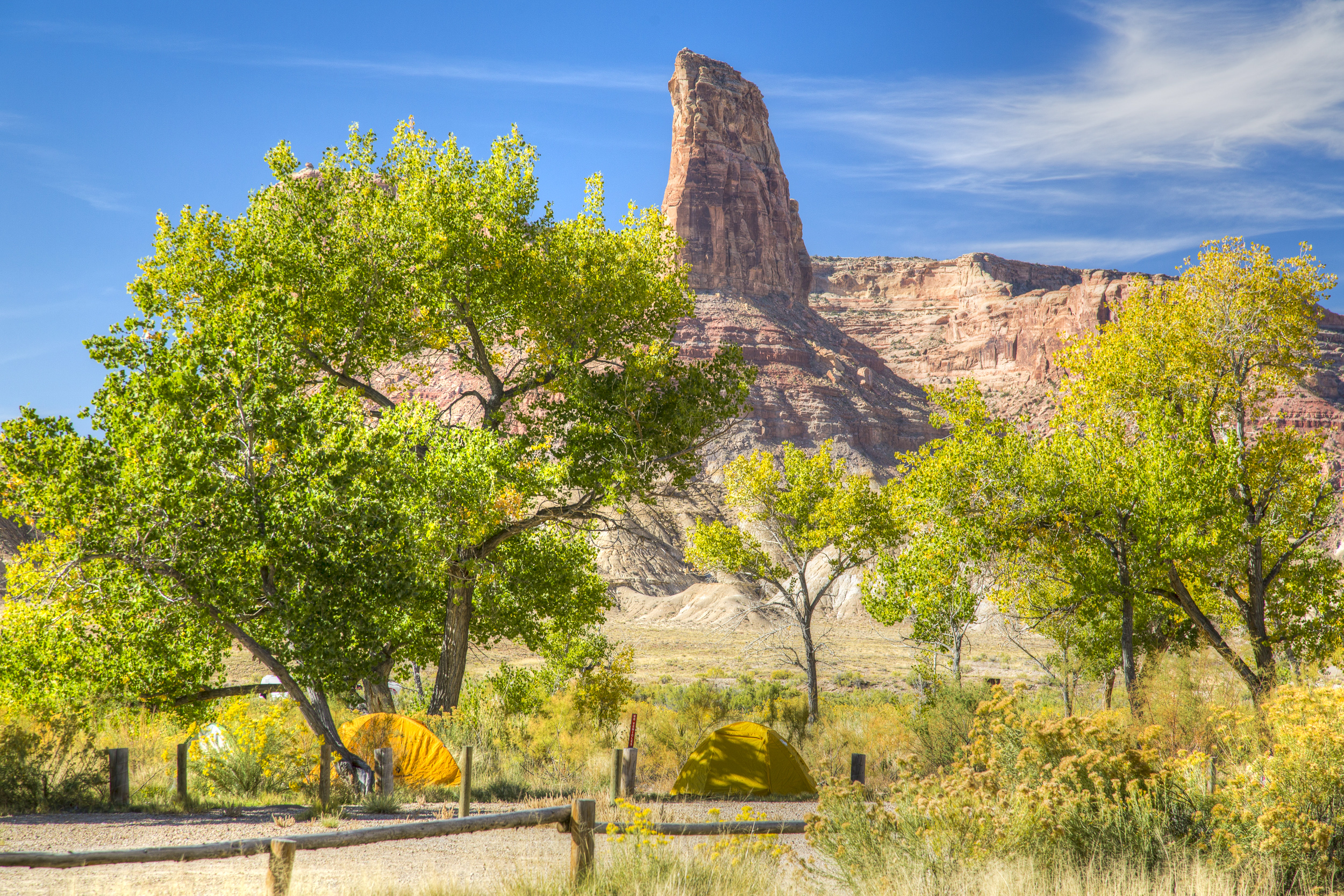

Highest point
- Elevation: 6,235 ft (1,900 m)
- Prominence: 455 ft (139 m)
- Parent peak: Point 6403
- Isolation: 0.65 mi (1.05 km)
- Coordinates: 39°04′06″N 110°40′51″W

Geography
- Location within Utah Location within the United States
- Location: Emery County, Utah, U.S.
- Parent range: San Rafael Swell; Colorado Plateau
- Topo map: USGS Bottleneck Peak

Geology
- Rock type: sandstone

Climbing
- First ascent: June 23, 1973 by Jim Langdon
- Easiest route: class 5.11- climbing

Bottleneck Peak is a natural monolith located on the eastern side of Sids Mountain in the Utah San Rafael Swell wilderness area. It is situated 2.1 miles (3.4 km) northwest of Window Blind Peak. Precipitation runoff from this feature drains north into the San Rafael River.

== Gallery ==
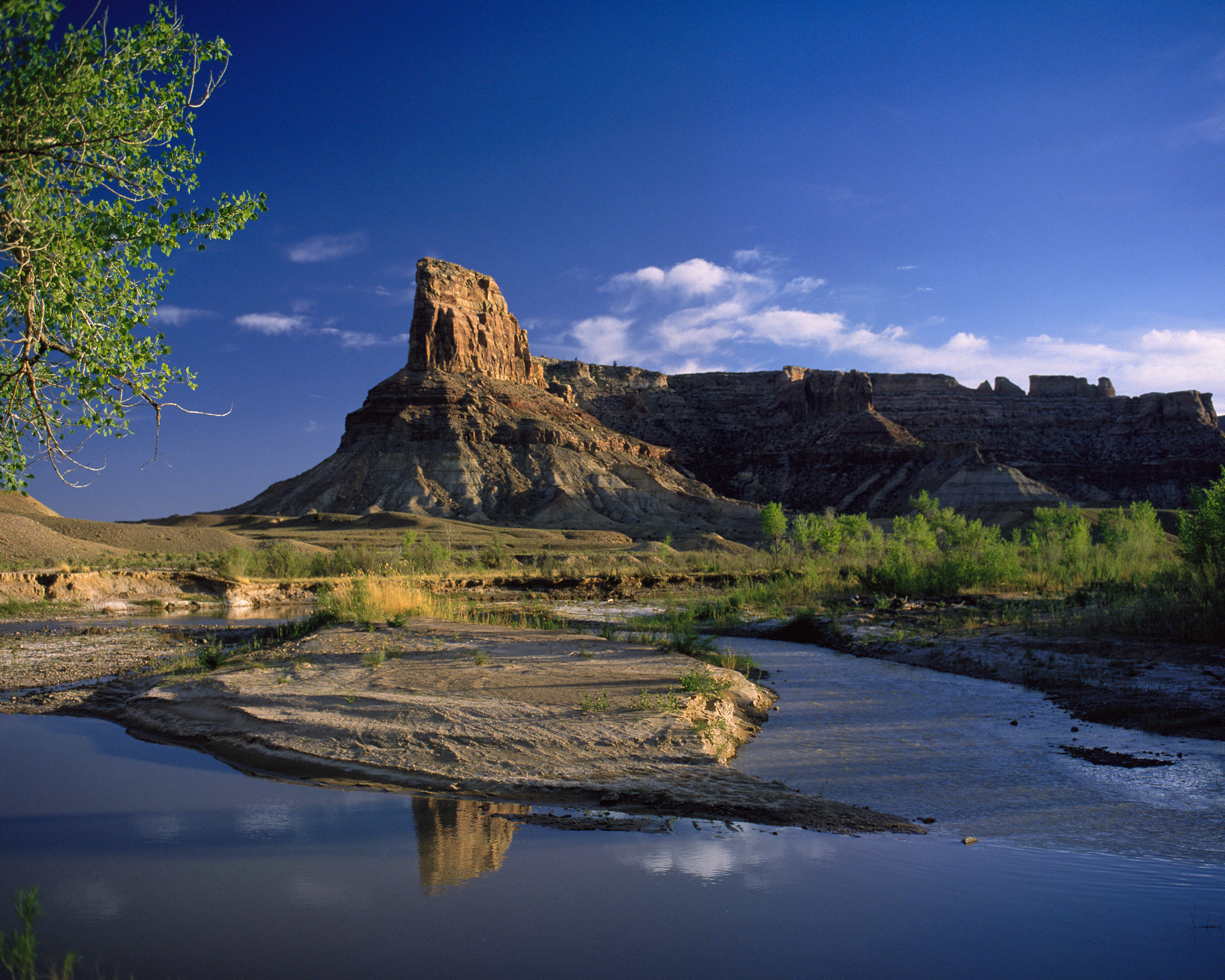
Bottleneck Peak and San Rafael River

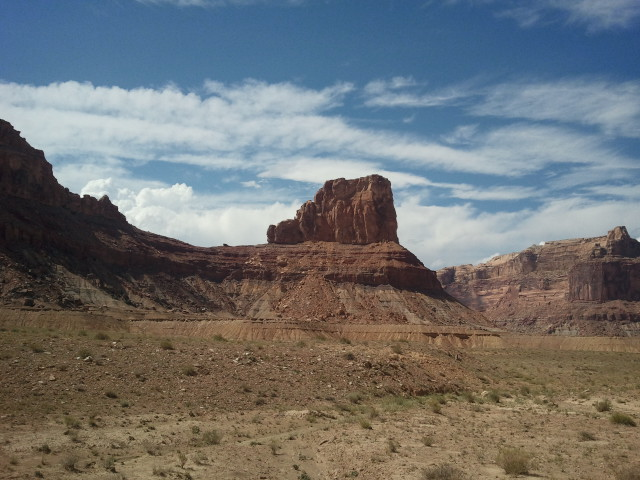

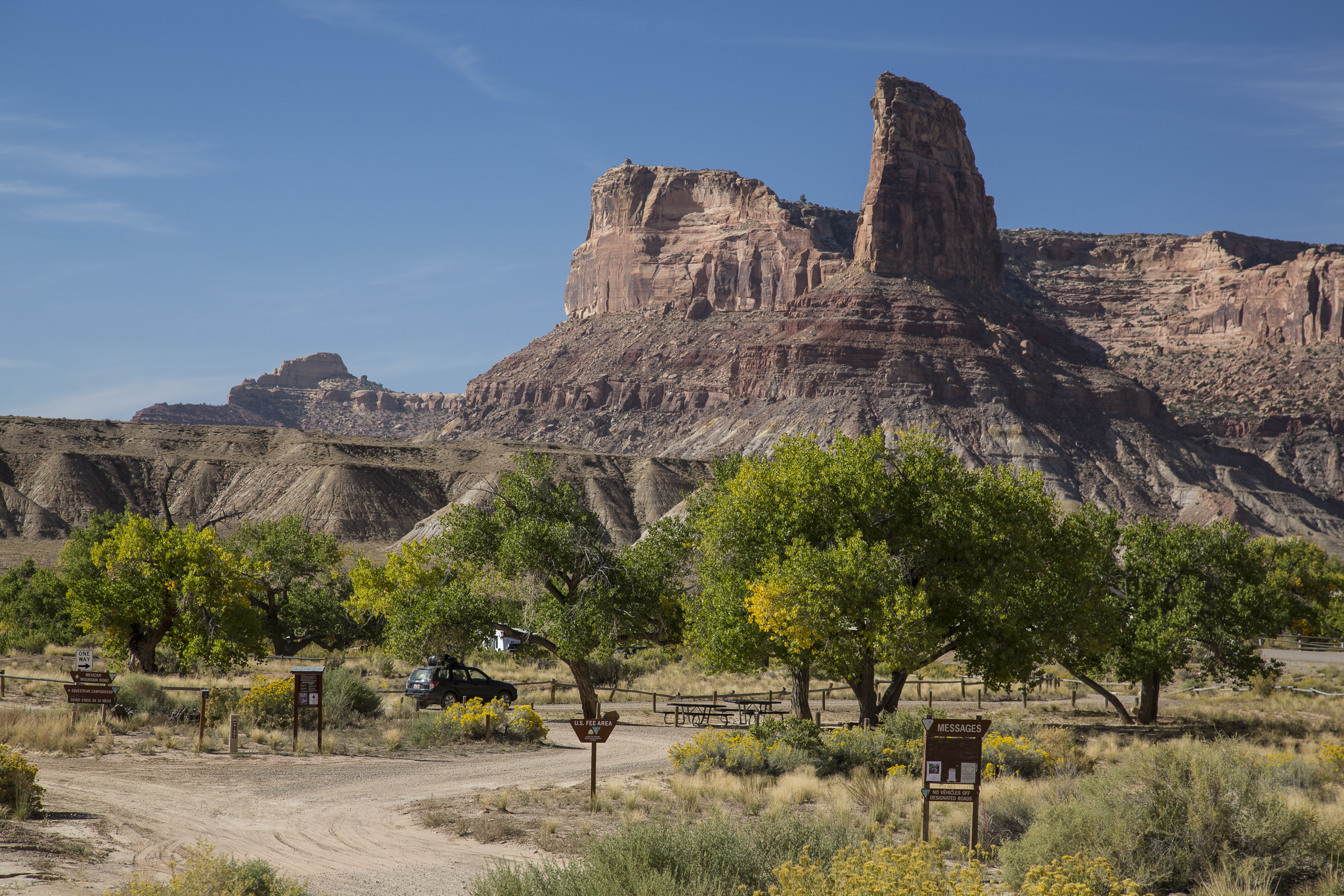

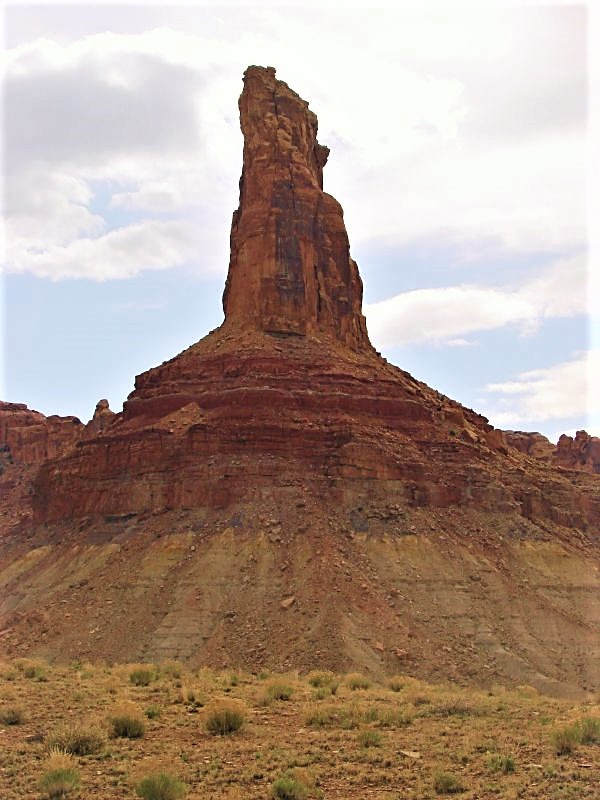
