= Wolverine Peak (Alaska) =

Mountain in Alaska, United States

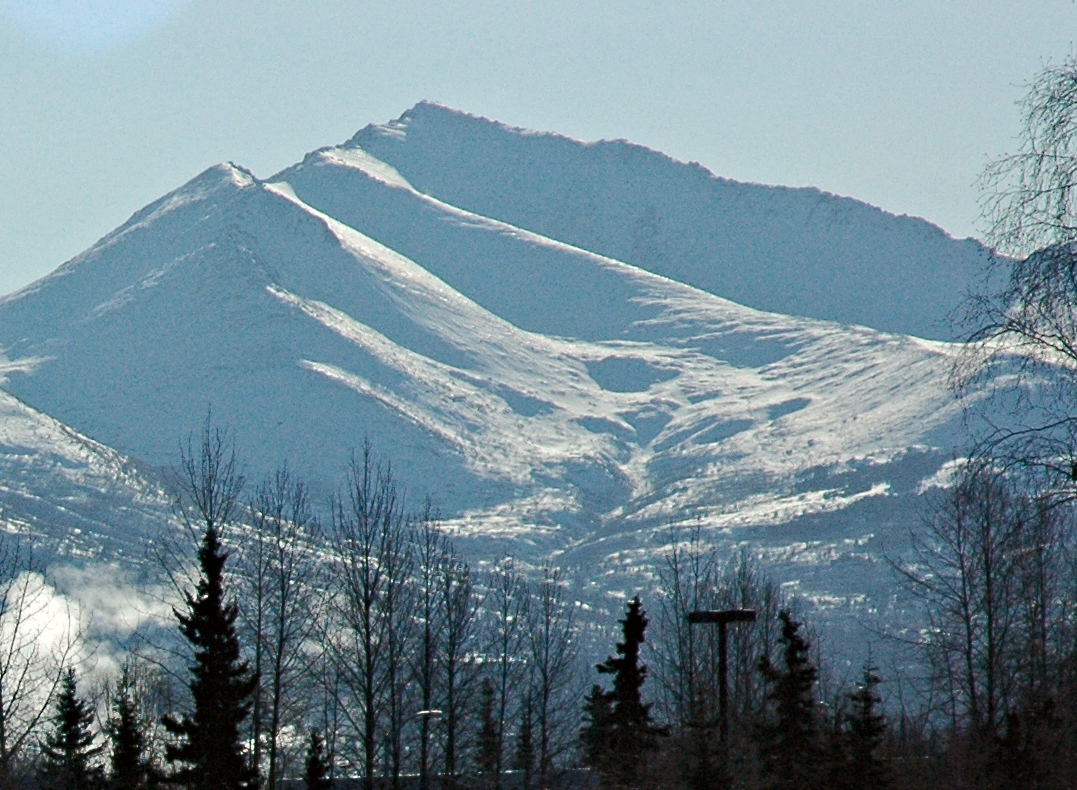
- Northwest aspect, from Anchorage

Highest point
- Elevation: 4,491 ft (1,369 m)
- Prominence: 685 ft (209 m)
- Parent peak: Mount Elliott
- Isolation: 1.85 mi (2.98 km)
- Coordinates: 61°08′05″N 149°36′51″W

Geography
- Location within Alaska
- Location: Chugach State Park; Anchorage Municipality, Alaska; United States
- Parent range: Chugach Mountains
- Topo map: USGS Anchorage A-7

Climbing
- Easiest route: Hiking trail class 2

Wolverine Peak is a 4,491-foot (1,369 m) mountain summit located in the western Chugach Mountains, in Anchorage Municipality, in the U.S. state of Alaska. Wolverine Peak is situated in Chugach State Park, 10 mi (16 km) southeast of downtown Anchorage, and 2.6 mi (4 km) northwest of O'Malley Peak. It is a prominent mountain on the Anchorage skyline. This geographic feature was so-named in 1963 by members of the Mountaineering Club of Alaska who found wolverine tracks in the snow near the summit. The name was officially adopted in 1964 by the U.S. Board on Geographic Names. A popular hike on a five-mile trail leads to the summit with views of Mount Williwaw, Denali, Mount Foraker, Cook Inlet, and Anchorage.

== Climate ==
Based on the Köppen climate classification, Wolverine Peak is located in a subarctic climate zone with long, cold, snowy winters, and mild summers. Temperatures can drop below −20 °C with wind chill factors below −30 °C. Precipitation runoff from the peak drains into Campbell Creek, which empties into Turnagain Arm.

== See also ==
- List of mountain peaks of Alaska
- Geology of Alaska
