= Temptation Peak =

Mountain in Alaska, United States

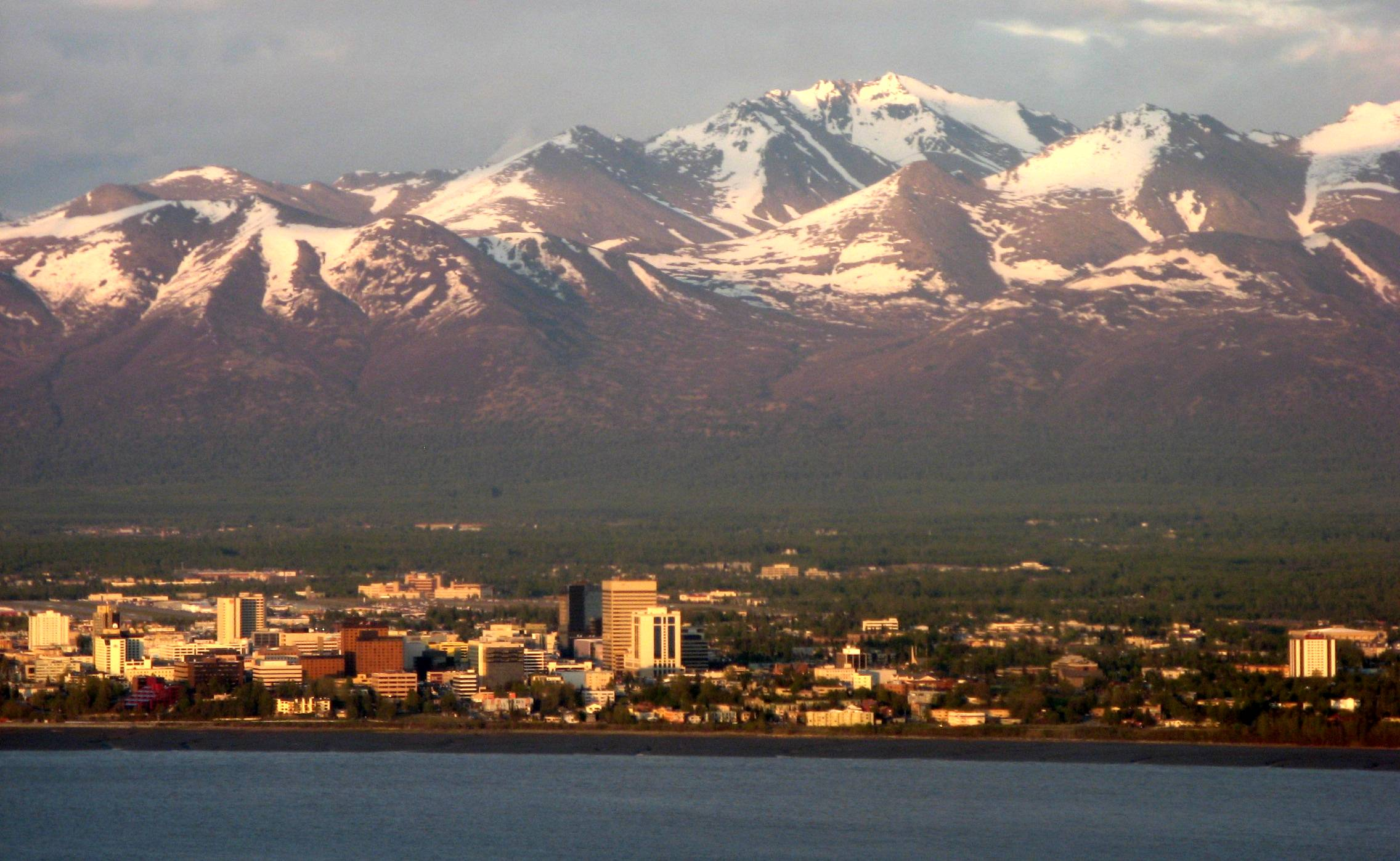
- West aspect, highest point on skyline

Highest point
- Elevation: 5,383 ft (1,641 m)
- Prominence: 1,102 ft (336 m)
- Parent peak: Mount Williwaw (5,446 ft)
- Isolation: 4.37 mi (7.03 km)
- Coordinates: 61°10′00″N 149°31′23″W

Geography
- Location within Alaska
- Interactive map of Temptation Peak
- Country: United States
- State: Alaska
- Borough: Anchorage
- Protected area: Chugach State Park
- Parent range: Chugach Mountains
- Topo map: USGS Anchorage A-7

Climbing
- First ascent: 1963
- Easiest route: Hiking class 2

Temptation Peak is a 5,383-foot (1,641 m) mountain summit in the U.S. state of Alaska.

== Description ==
Temptation Peak is located 12 miles (19 km) east of Anchorage in the western Chugach Mountains and within Chugach State Park. Precipitation runoff from the mountain drains west to Cook Inlet via Snowhawk Creek and Ship Creek. Although modest in elevation, relief is significant as the summit rises approximately 3,800 feet (1,158 m) above Ship Creek in 1.5 miles (2.4 km). An ascent of the summit involves hiking 17 miles (round-trip) with 5,100 feet of elevation gain. The months of May through September offer the best time for climbing the peak.

== History ==
The mountain was so named in 1963 by members of the Mountaineering Club of Alaska because many were tempted to climb it. The mountain's toponym was officially adopted in 1964 by the United States Board on Geographic Names. The first ascent of the summit was made in 1963 by Vin Hoeman.

== Climate ==
Based on the Köppen climate classification, Temptation Peak is located in a subarctic climate zone with long, cold, snowy winters, and mild summers. Weather systems coming off the Gulf of Alaska are forced upwards by the Chugach Mountains (orographic lift), causing heavy precipitation in the form of rainfall and snowfall. Winter temperatures can drop below −10 °F with wind chill factors below −20 °F.

== Gallery ==
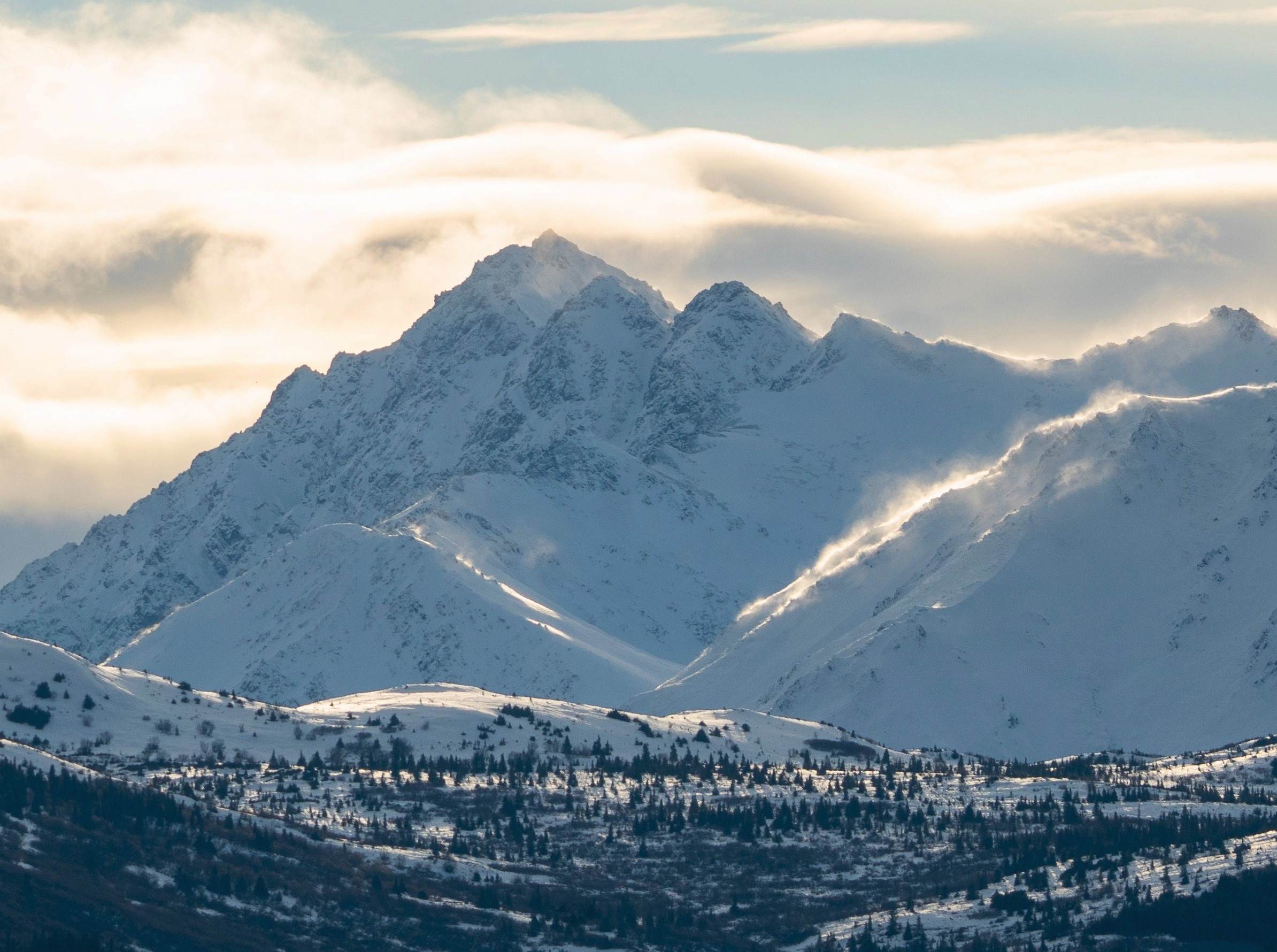
Temptation Peak, north aspect

== See also ==
- List of mountain peaks of Alaska
- Geography of Alaska
