= O'Malley Peak =

Mountain summit in Alaska, United States

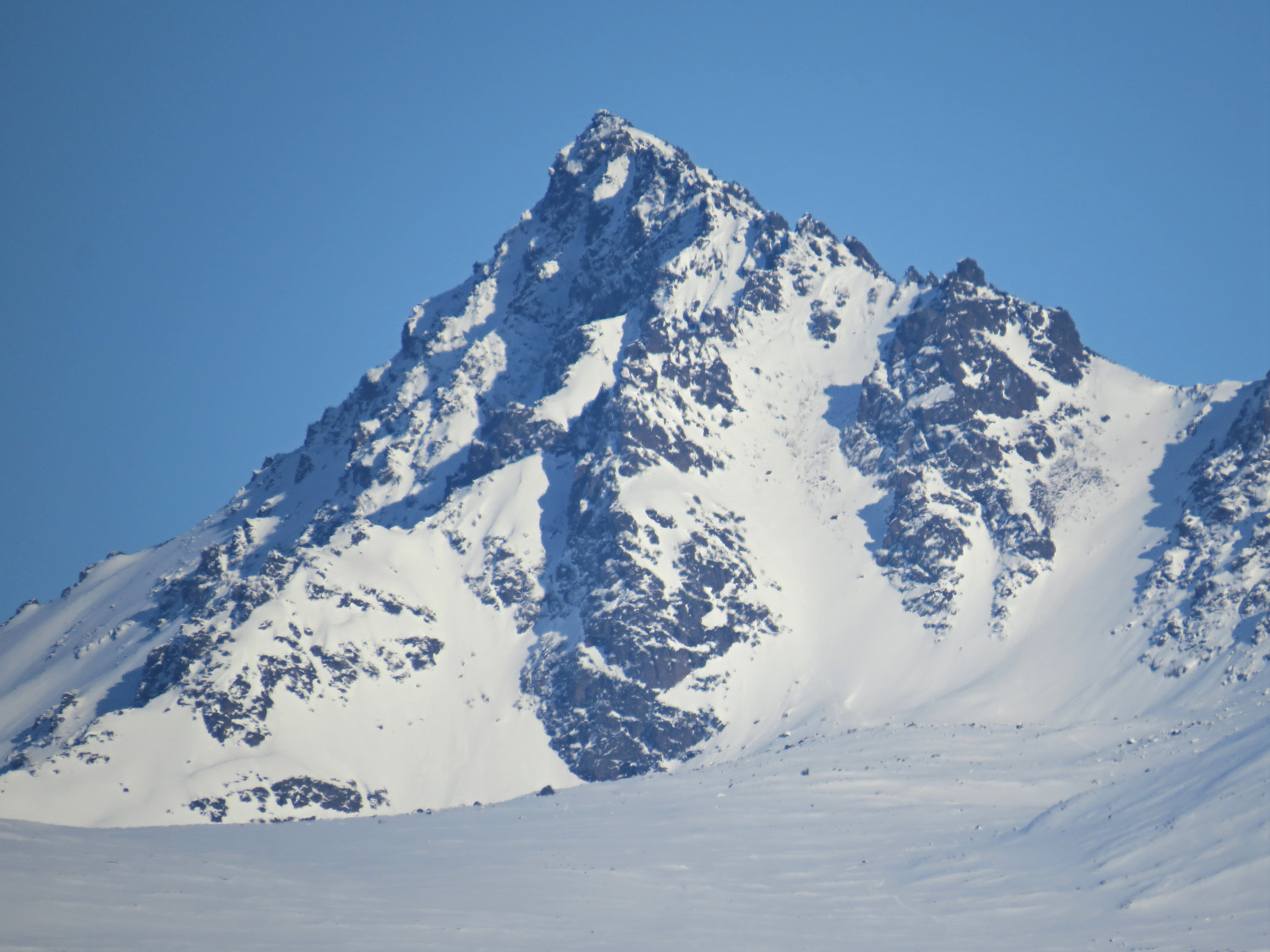
- O'Malley Peak

Highest point
- Elevation: 5,150+ ft (1,570+ m)
- Prominence: 350 ft (110 m)
- Parent peak: The Ramp (5,240 ft)
- Coordinates: 61°05′58″N 149°34′58″W

Geography
- Location within Alaska
- Interactive map of O'Malley Peak
- Country: United States
- State: Alaska
- Borough: Anchorage Municipality
- Protected area: Chugach State Park
- Parent range: Chugach Mountains
- Topo map: USGS Anchorage A-7

Climbing
- Easiest route: Hiking class 2 South slope

O'Malley Peak is a 5,150+ ft (1,570+ m) mountain summit located in the Chugach Mountains, in Anchorage Municipality in the U.S. state of Alaska. O'Malley Peak is situated in Chugach State Park, 12 mi (19 km) southeast of downtown Anchorage, 2.3 mi (4 km) west of Mount Williwaw, and 1.45 mi (2 km) northwest of The Ramp, which is its nearest higher peak. Access is via the Powerline Trail with several scramble routes to the summit.

== Dr. James O'Malley ==
"Doc" O'Malley moved to Anchorage in 1946 and practiced medicine there until his death in 1974. He was one of the first doctors in town, respected by his peers and beloved by patients. There is also a school and road named after him in Anchorage.

== Climate ==
Based on the Köppen climate classification, O'Malley Peak is located in a subarctic climate zone with long, cold, snowy winters, and mild summers. Weather systems coming off the Gulf of Alaska are forced upwards by the Chugach Mountains (orographic lift), causing heavy precipitation in the form of rain and snow. Winter temperatures can drop to 10 °F with wind chill factors below 0 °F. Precipitation runoff from the peak drains into Campbell Creek.

== Gallery ==
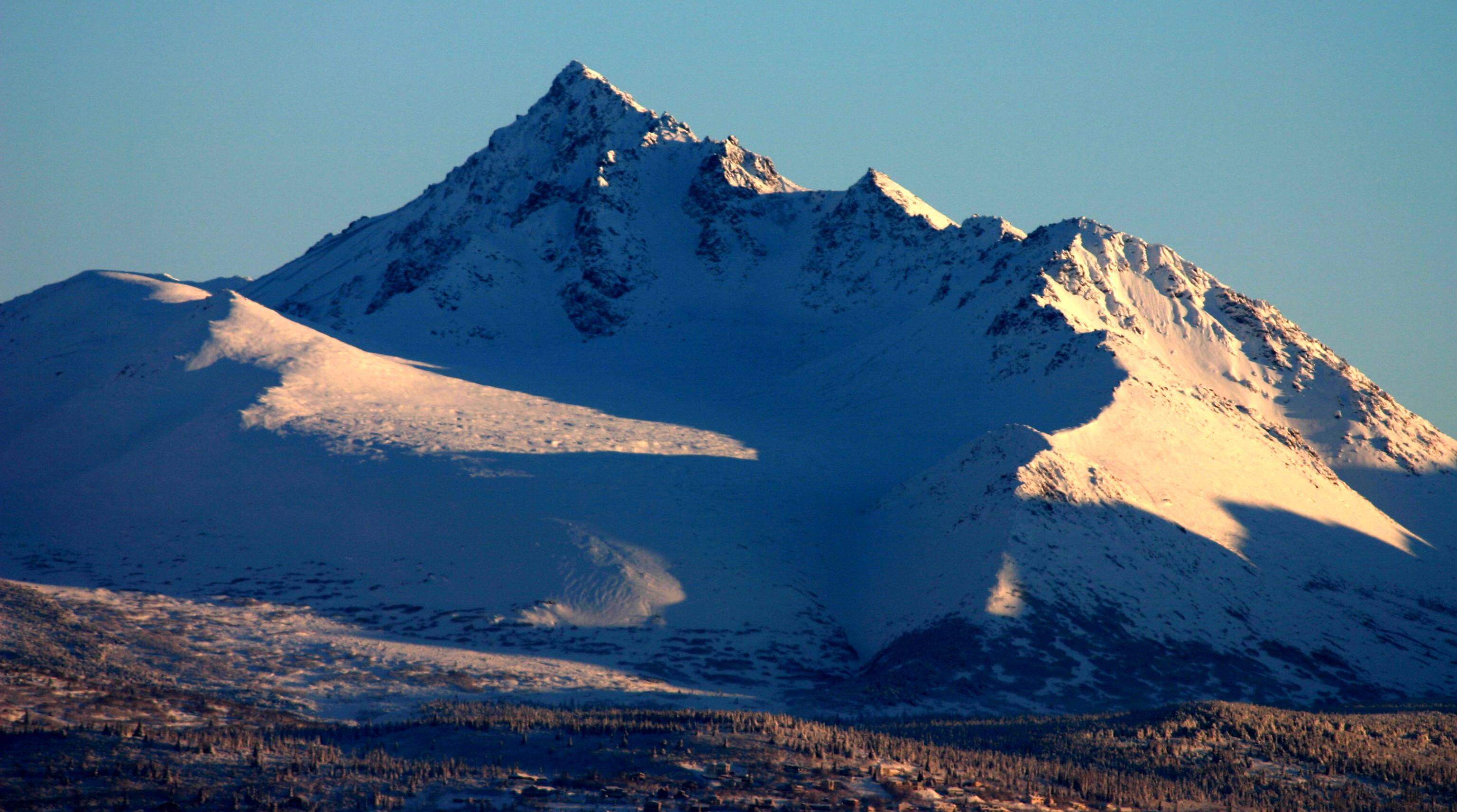
O'Malley Peak seen from Anchorage airport

== See also ==
- List of mountain peaks of Alaska
- Geography of Alaska
