= The Ramp (Alaska) =

Mountain in Alaska, United States

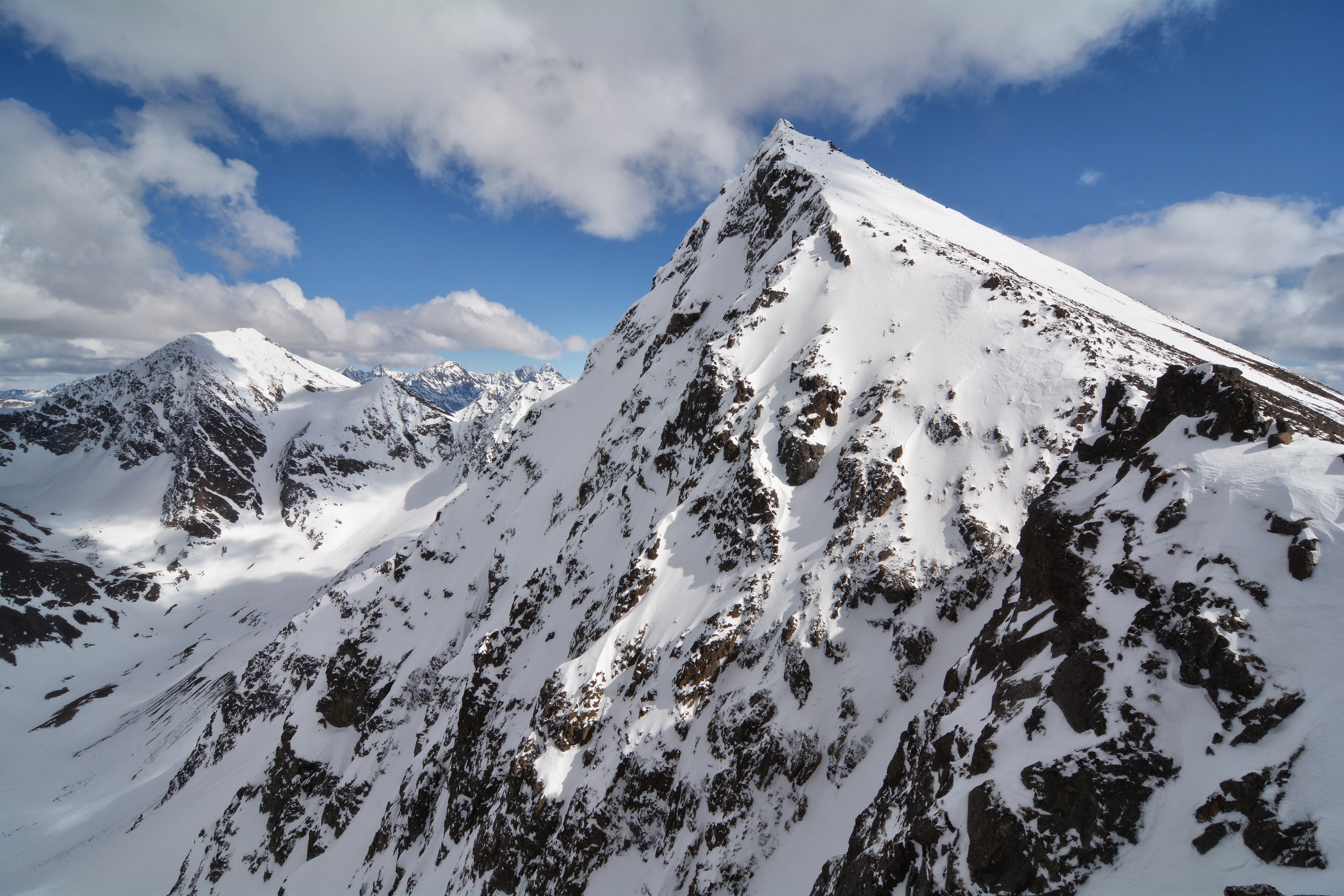

Highest point
- Elevation: 5,240 ft (1,597 m)
- Prominence: 740 ft (226 m)
- Parent peak: Mount Williwaw
- Coordinates: 61°05′22″N 149°32′42″W

Geography
- Location within Alaska
- Interactive map of The Ramp
- Country: United States
- State: Alaska
- Borough: Anchorage Municipality
- Protected area: Chugach State Park
- Parent range: Chugach Mountains
- Topo map: USGS Anchorage A-7

Climbing
- Easiest route: Hiking class 2

The Ramp is a 5,240-foot (1,597 m) mountain summit located in the Chugach Mountains, in Anchorage Municipality in the U.S. state of Alaska. The Ramp is situated in Chugach State Park, 12 mi (19 km) southeast of downtown Anchorage, and 1.42 mi (2 km) southwest of Mount Williwaw, the nearest higher peak. Access is via the Powerline Trail. Precipitation runoff from the peak drains west into Campbell Creek and east into headwaters of Ship Creek. The mountain's toponym has been officially adopted by the United States Geological Survey.

== Climate ==
Based on the Köppen climate classification, The Ramp is located in a subarctic climate zone with long, cold, snowy winters, and mild summers. Weather systems coming off the Gulf of Alaska are forced upwards by the Chugach Mountains (orographic lift), causing heavy precipitation in the form of rain and snow. Winter temperatures can drop below 10 °F with wind chill factors below 0 °F.

== Gallery ==
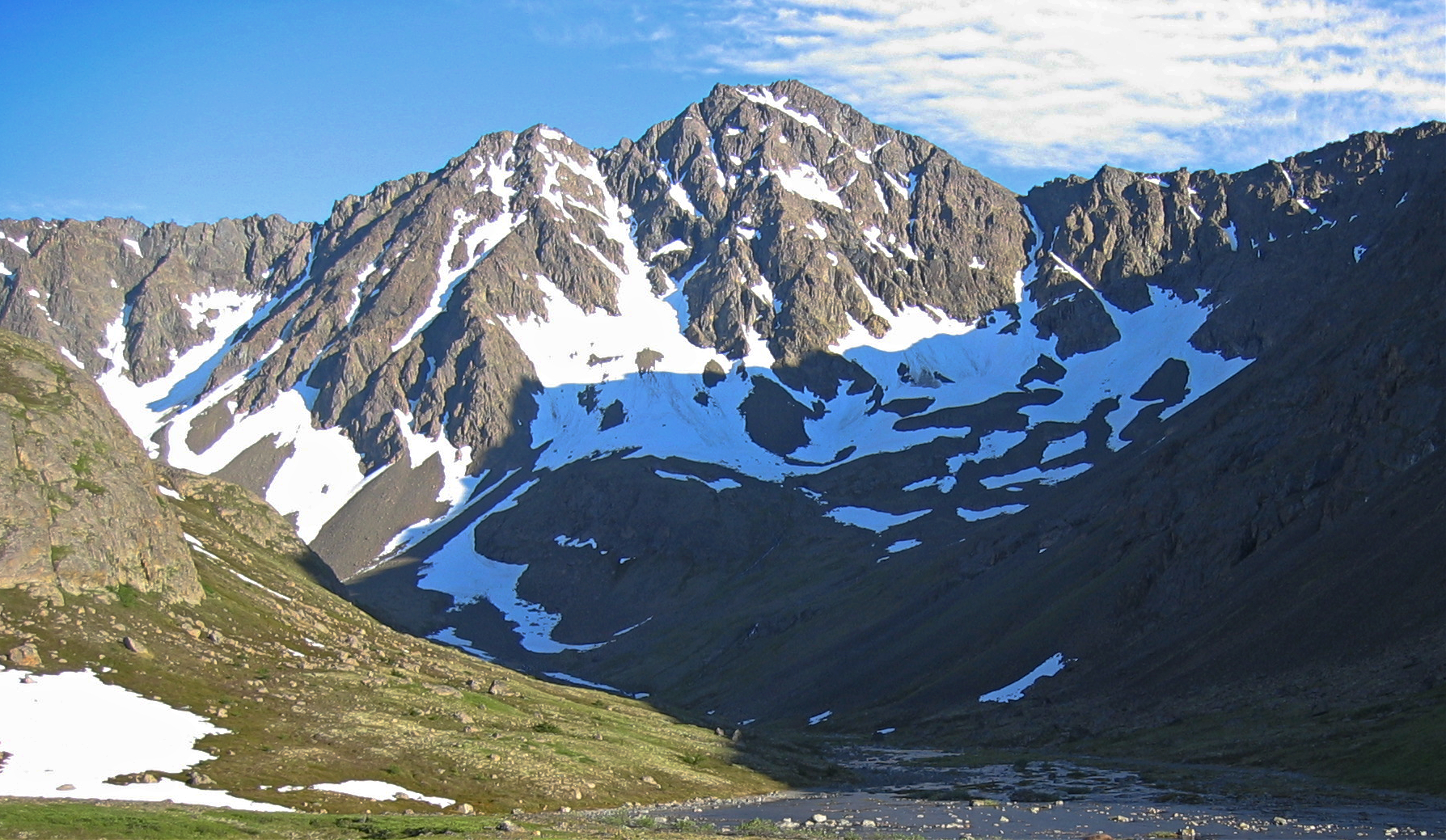
The steep north face of The Ramp

== See also ==
- List of mountain peaks of Alaska
- Geology of Alaska
