= Mount Williwaw =

Mountain in Alaska, United States

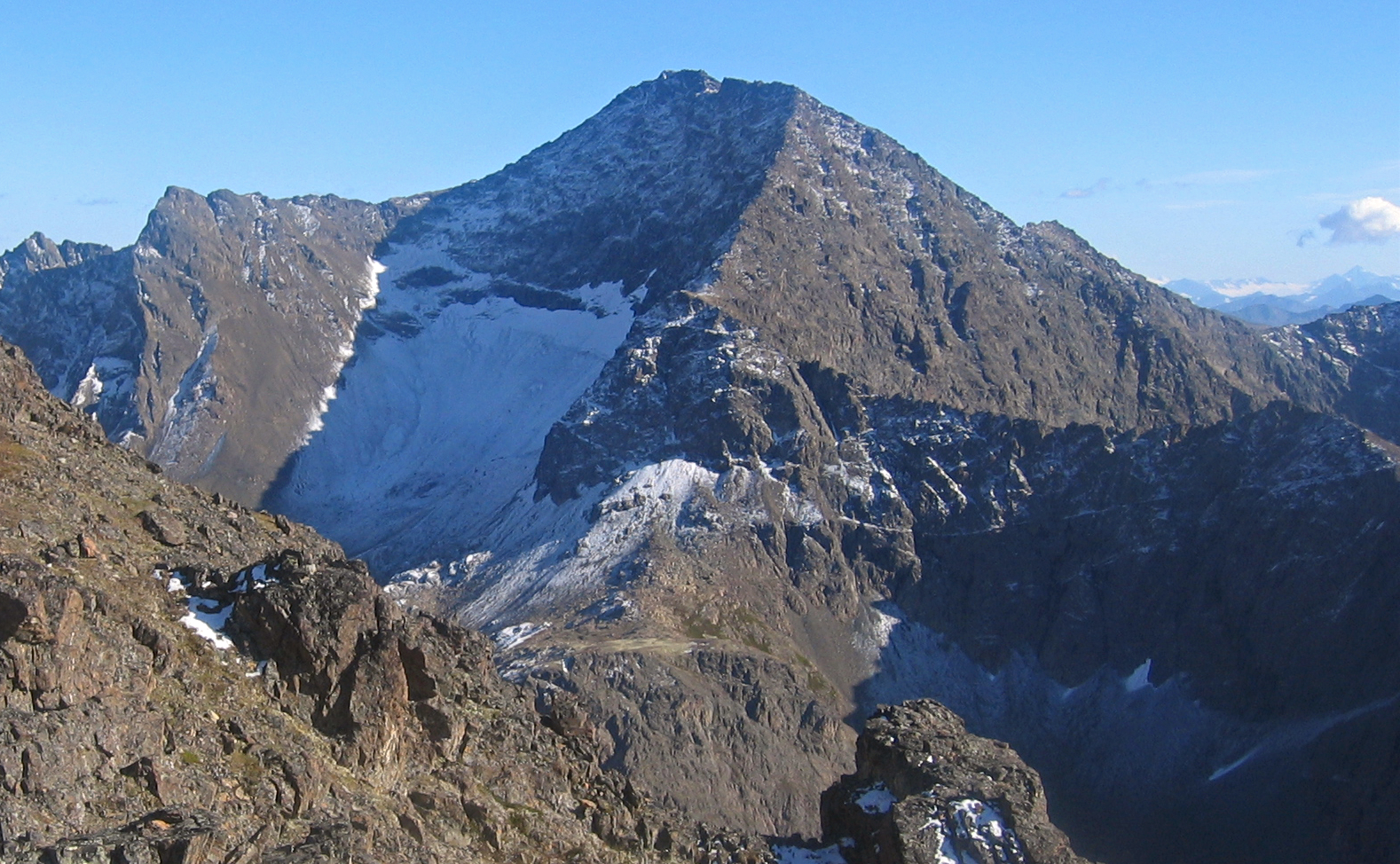
- Mount Williwaw seen from Mt. Elliott

Highest point
- Elevation: 5,446 ft (1,660 m)
- Prominence: 3,245 ft (989 m)
- Coordinates: 61°06′13″N 149°30′52″W

Geography
- Location within Alaska
- Interactive map of Mount Williwaw
- Location: Chugach State Park; Anchorage Municipality, Alaska; United States
- Parent range: Chugach Mountains
- Topo map: USGS Anchorage A-7

Climbing
- First ascent: 1965
- Easiest route: Scrambling class 3

Mount Williwaw is a prominent 5,446-foot (1,660 m) mountain summit located in the Chugach Mountains, in Anchorage Municipality in the U.S. state of Alaska. Mount Williwaw, the highest peak of the Chugach Front Range, is situated in Chugach State Park, 12 mi (19 km) southeast of downtown Anchorage, and 1.4 mi (2 km) northeast of The Ramp. The Williwaw Lakes lie below the north and west slopes of the mountain and provide pleasant campsites for climbers not wanting to climb the mountain in one arduous day. The mountain's name was officially adopted in 1964 by the United States Geological Survey based on a recommendation by the Mountaineering Club of Alaska because an infantry company from nearby Fort Richardson was caught in a williwaw near this mountain in May 1962. Three men died of exhaustion before the group was rescued. The first ascent of this peak was made June 11, 1965, by David Judd, M. Judd, Myers, and Parker via the South Ridge.

== Climate ==
Based on the Köppen climate classification, Mount Williwaw is located in a subarctic climate with long, cold, snowy winters, and mild summers. Temperatures can drop below −20 °C with wind chill factors below −30 °C. Precipitation runoff from the peak drains into Ship Creek and Campbell Creek.

== See also ==
- List of mountain peaks of Alaska
- Geology of Alaska

== Gallery ==
Views of Mt. Williwaw

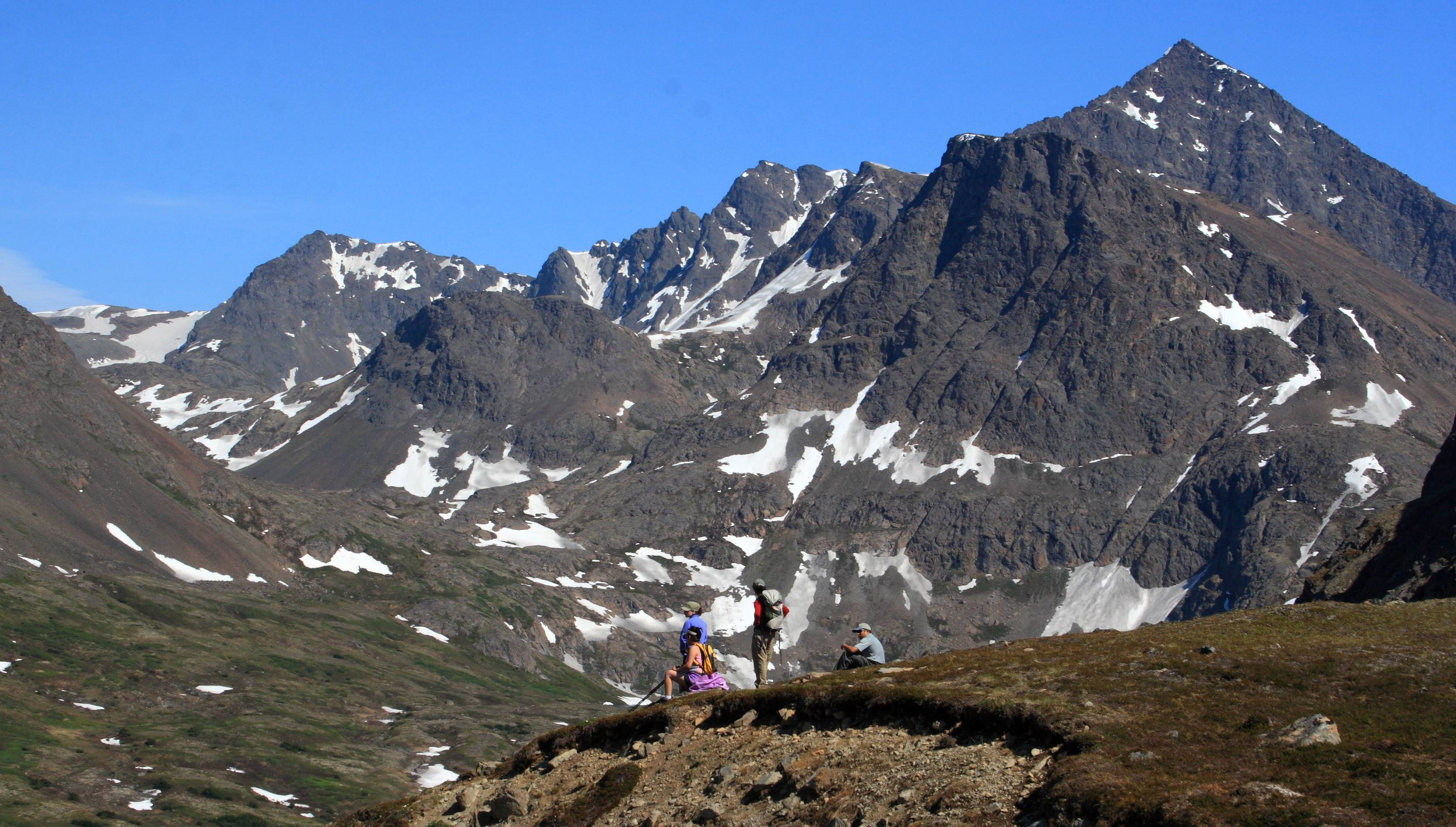
Mt. Williwaw to right

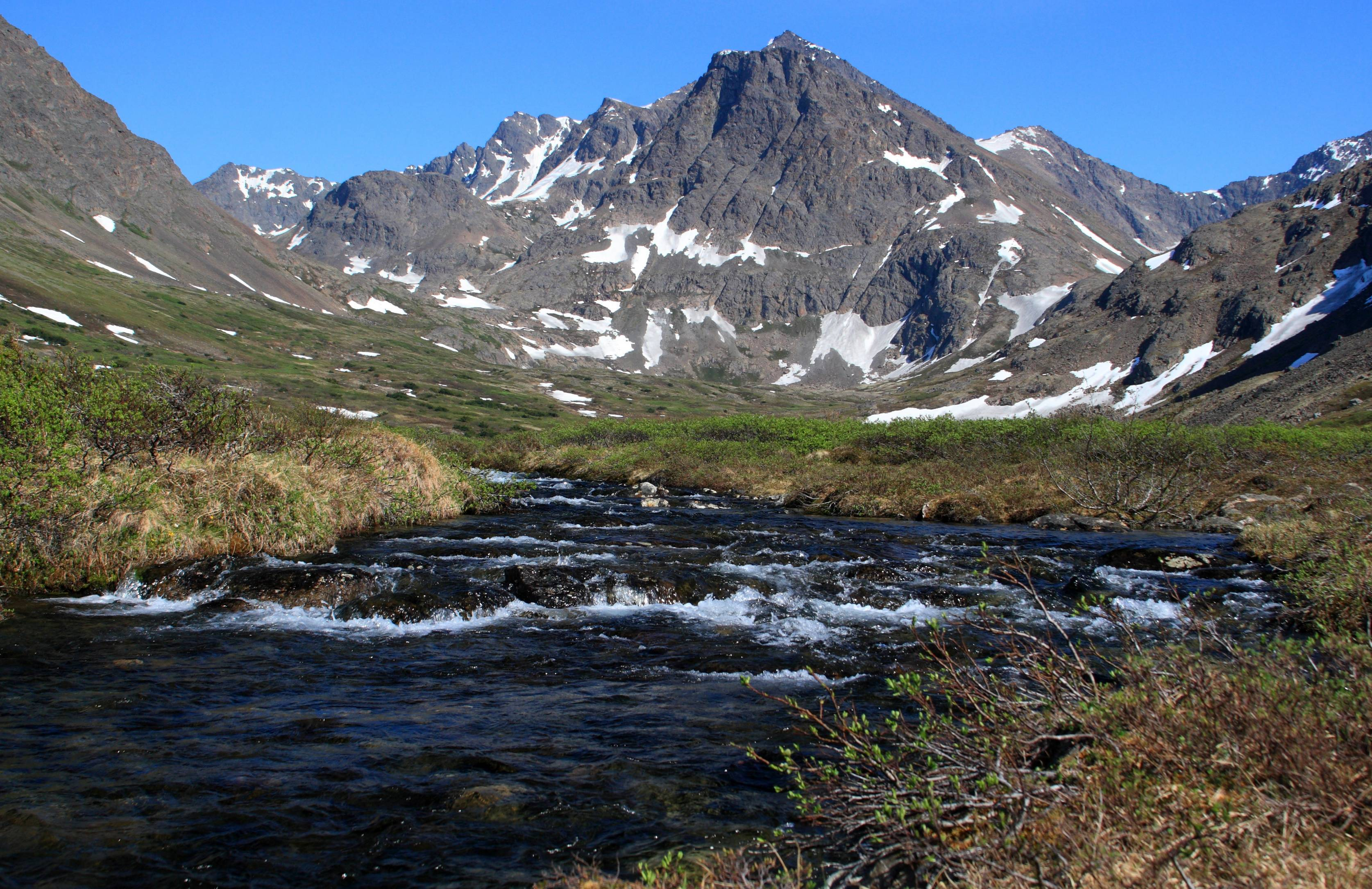
Mt. Williwaw in background

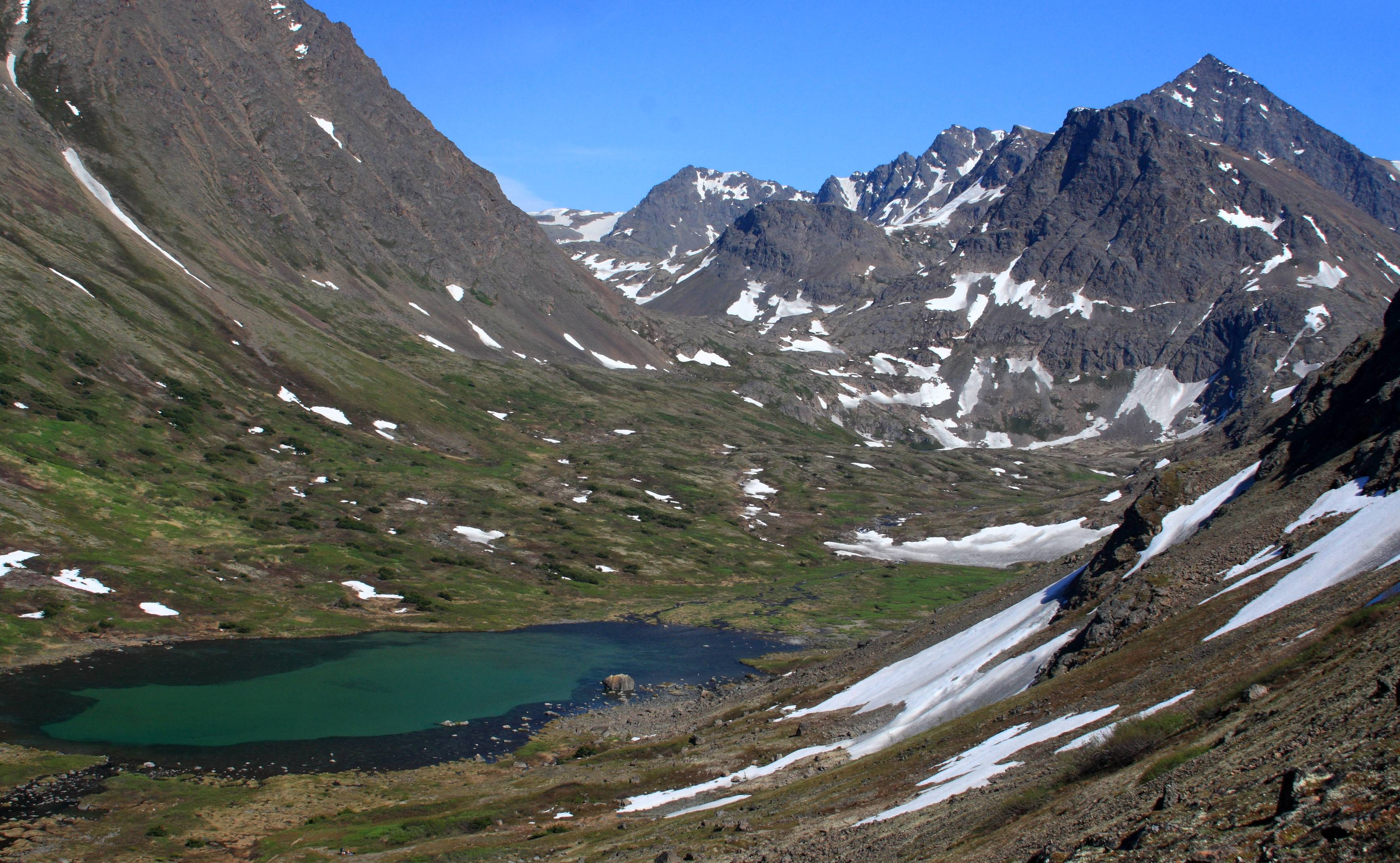
Williwaw Lake with Mt. Williwaw to right

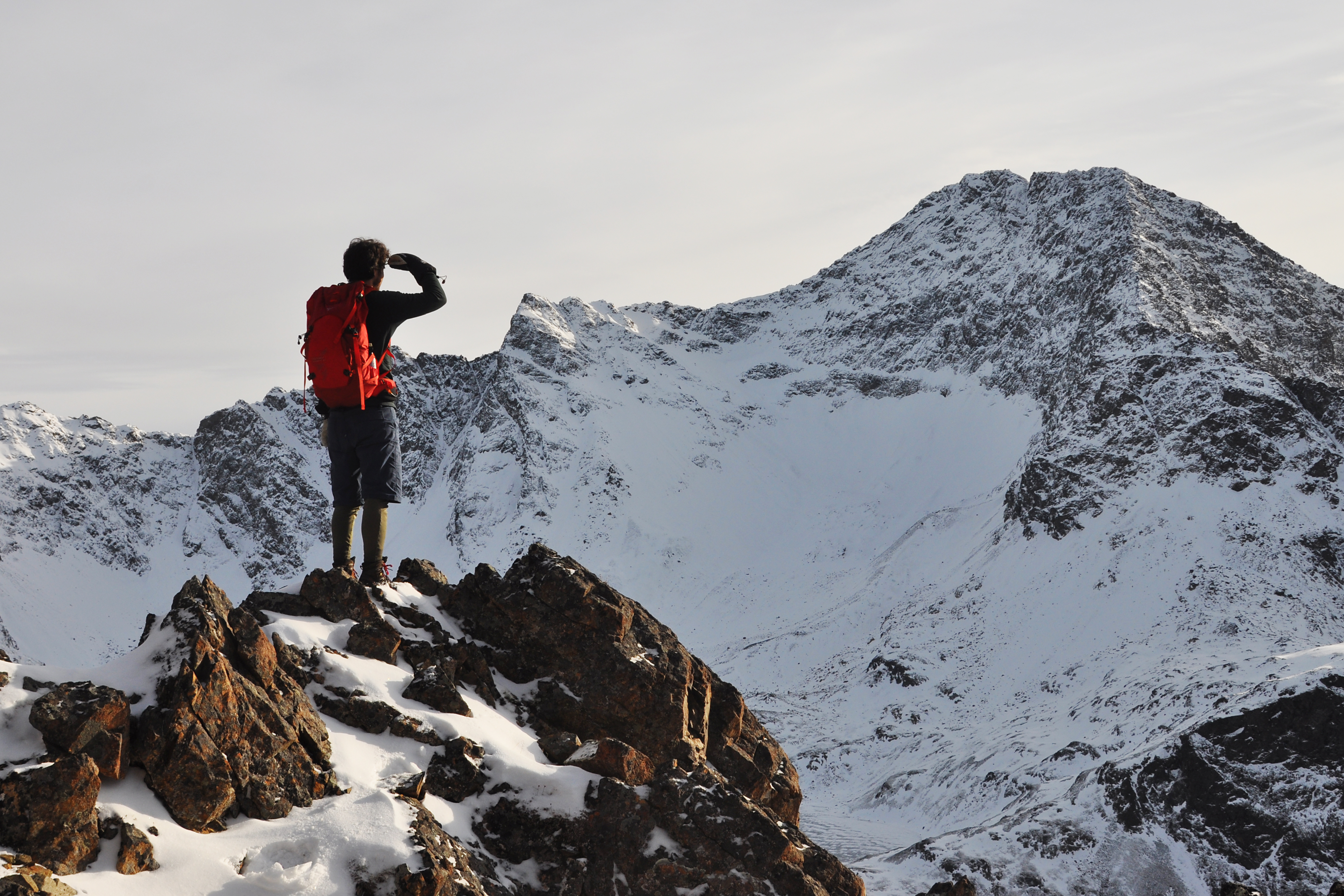
Mt. Williwaw seen from Mount Elliott
