= Mile High =

Mile High may refer to:

== Arts and entertainment ==
- Mile High (novel), by Richard Condon, 1969
- Mile High (TV series), 2003–2005 British television show about airline employees
- Mile High (album), by Kottonmouth Kings, 2012
- "Mile High" (song), by James Blake featuring Travis Scott and Metro Boomin, 2019

== Related to Denver and Colorado ==
- "Mile High City", a name for Denver, because of its elevation of one mile or 5,280 feet
- Mile High Stadium, in Denver, former home of the Denver Broncos football team
- Empower Field at Mile High, current home of the Denver Broncos football team
  - Empower Field at Mile High station, a light rail station at the stadium
  - The "Mile High Salute" of Broncos player Terrell Davis
- Mile High Comics in Denver
- Mile High Newspapers in Golden, Colorado

== Other uses ==
- Mile High Illinois, a proposed supertall skyscraper by Frank Lloyd Wright in 1957, best known as The Illinois
- Mile High Peak, a mountain in Alaska
- Mile-High Tower, a supertall skyscraper to be built in Saudi Arabia, best known as Jeddah Tower

== See also ==
- Miles High, a 1981 album by John Miles
- Mile High Club (disambiguation)
