= Mount Magnificent (Alaska) =

Mountain in Alaska, United States

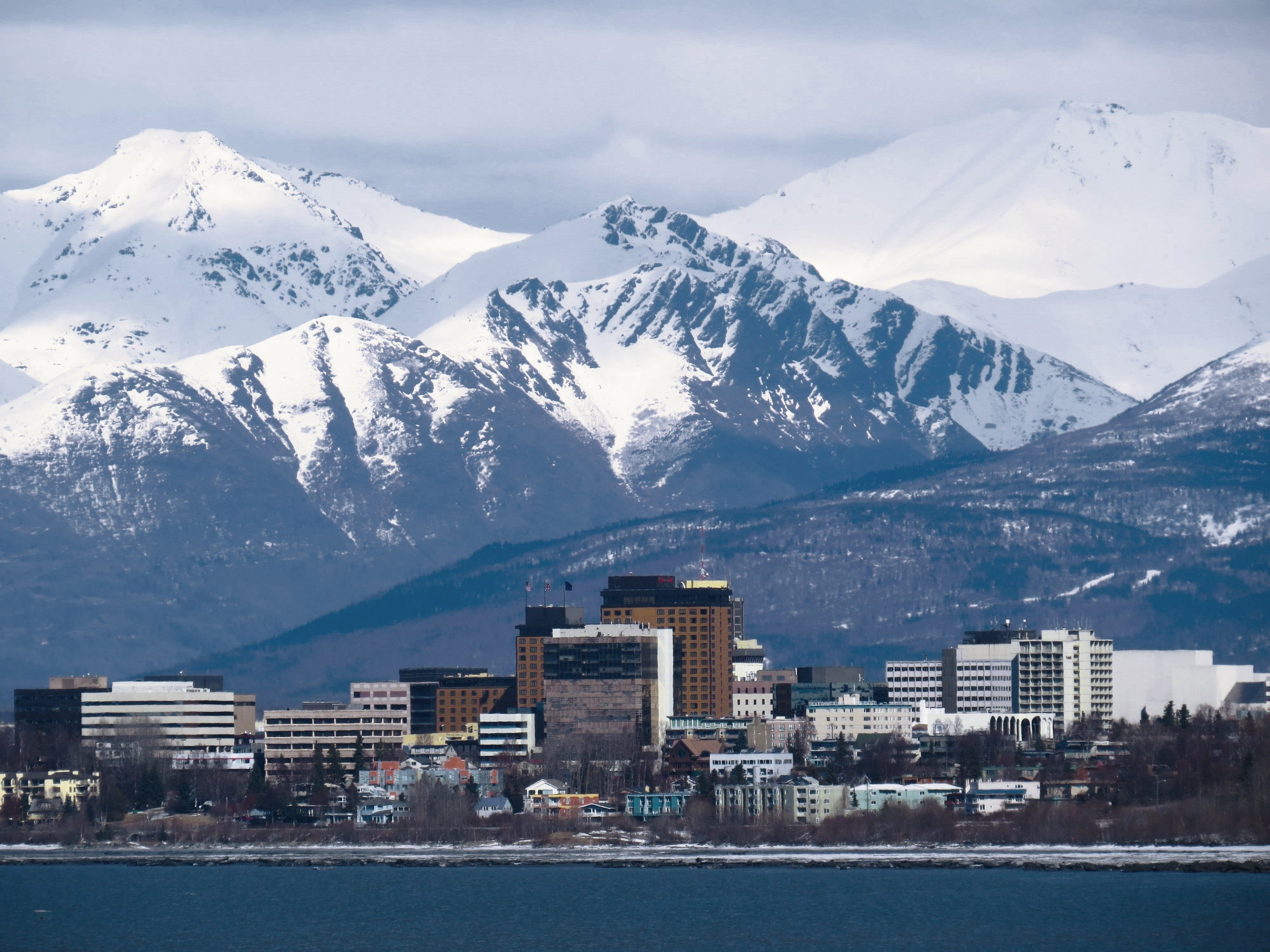
- Southwest aspect, centered

Highest point
- Elevation: 4,271 ft (1,302 m)
- Prominence: 715 ft (218 m)
- Parent peak: Mile High Peak (5,331 ft)
- Isolation: 1.37 mi (2.20 km)
- Coordinates: 61°18′55″N 149°24′32″W

Geography
- Location within Alaska
- Interactive map of Mount Magnificent
- Country: United States
- State: Alaska
- Borough: Anchorage
- Protected area: Chugach State Park
- Parent range: Chugach Mountains
- Topo map: USGS Anchorage B-7

Climbing
- Easiest route: Hiking class 2

Mount Magnificent is a 4,271-foot (1,302 m) mountain summit in Alaska, United States.

== Description ==
Mount Magnificent is located 15 miles (24 km) northeast of Anchorage in the western Chugach Mountains and within Chugach State Park. Precipitation runoff from the mountain drains to Knik Arm via Meadow Creek and Eagle River. Although modest in elevation, topographic relief is significant as the summit rises approximately 1,700 feet (518 m) above Meadow Creek in 0.6 miles (0.97 km) and 3,870 feet (1,180 m) above the Eagle River in two miles (3.2 km). An ascent of the summit involves hiking five miles with 2,300 feet of elevation gain. The months of May through September offer the best time for climbing the peak. The mountain's descriptive name was given in 1953 by Mrs. Ollie A. Trower of Anchorage and the toponym was officially adopted in 1959 by the United States Board on Geographic Names. However, based on a sketch submitted with her naming proposal, it appears that the mountain she intended to be named Mount Magnificent is actually Mile High Peak. The Denaʼina name for this peak is K'ulch'ey which means "Wind blows against it."

== Climate ==
Based on the Köppen climate classification, Mount Magnificent is located in a subarctic climate zone with long, cold, snowy winters, and mild summers. Weather systems coming off the Gulf of Alaska are forced upwards by the Chugach Mountains (orographic lift), causing heavy precipitation in the form of rainfall and snowfall. Winter temperatures can drop below −10 °F with wind chill factors below −20 °F.

== Gallery ==
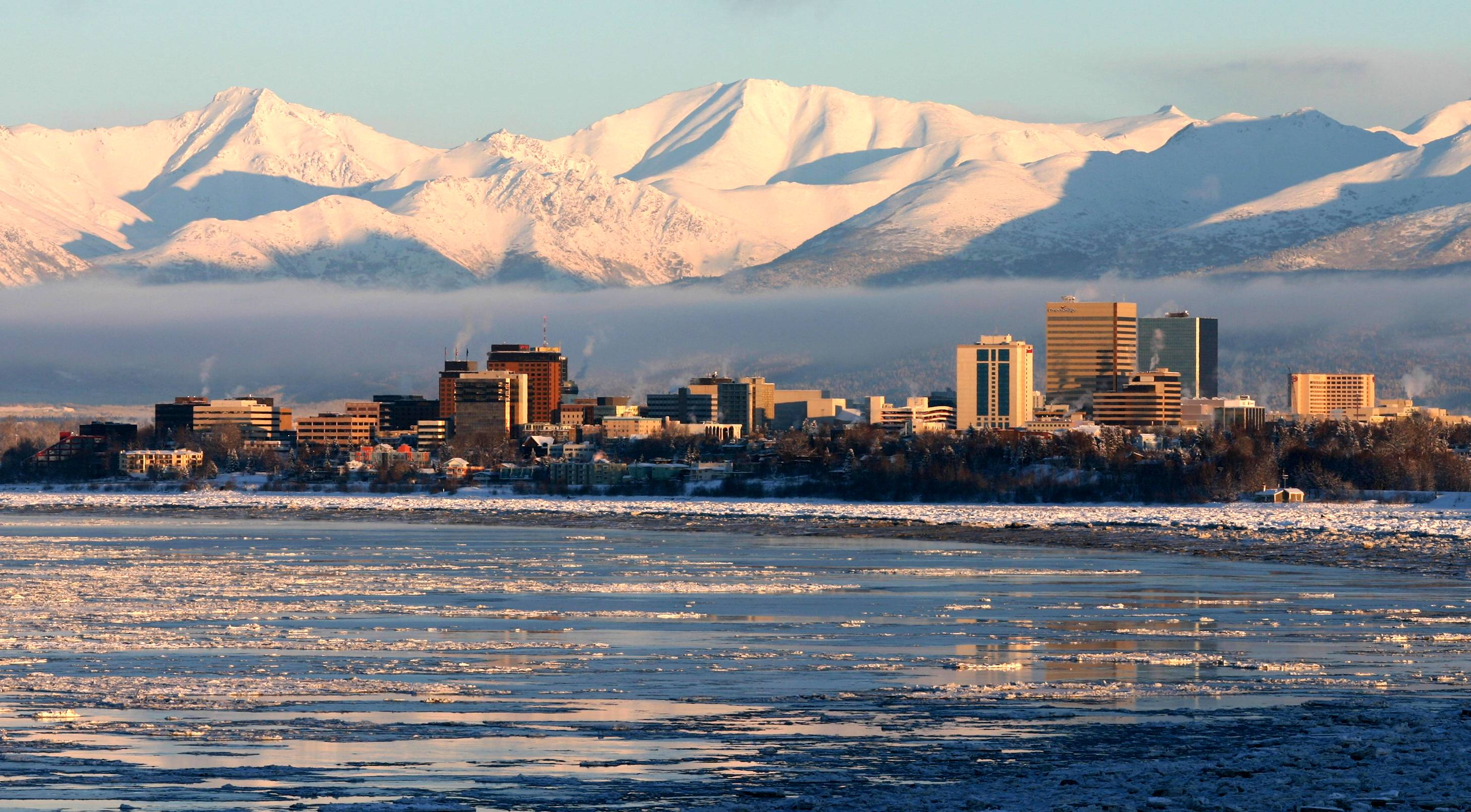
Anchorage, with Vista Peak in upper left, Mile High Peak centered at top, and Mount Magnificent between them

== See also ==
- List of mountain peaks of Alaska
- Geography of Alaska
