= Mile High Club (disambiguation) =

The mile-high club is slang for people who have had sexual intercourse on board an aircraft whilst in flight.

Mile High Club may also refer to:

- "Mile High Club", a song by Adam and the Ants from the 1981 album Prince Charming
- "Mile High Club", a song by Bow Wow Wow from the 1982 EP The Last of the Mohicans
- Mile High Club, a bonus mission in the Call of Duty 4: Modern Warfare campaign mode

== See also ==
- Mild High Club, an American psychedelic pop band
- Mile High (disambiguation)
