= Vista Peak (Alaska) =

Mountain in Alaska, United States

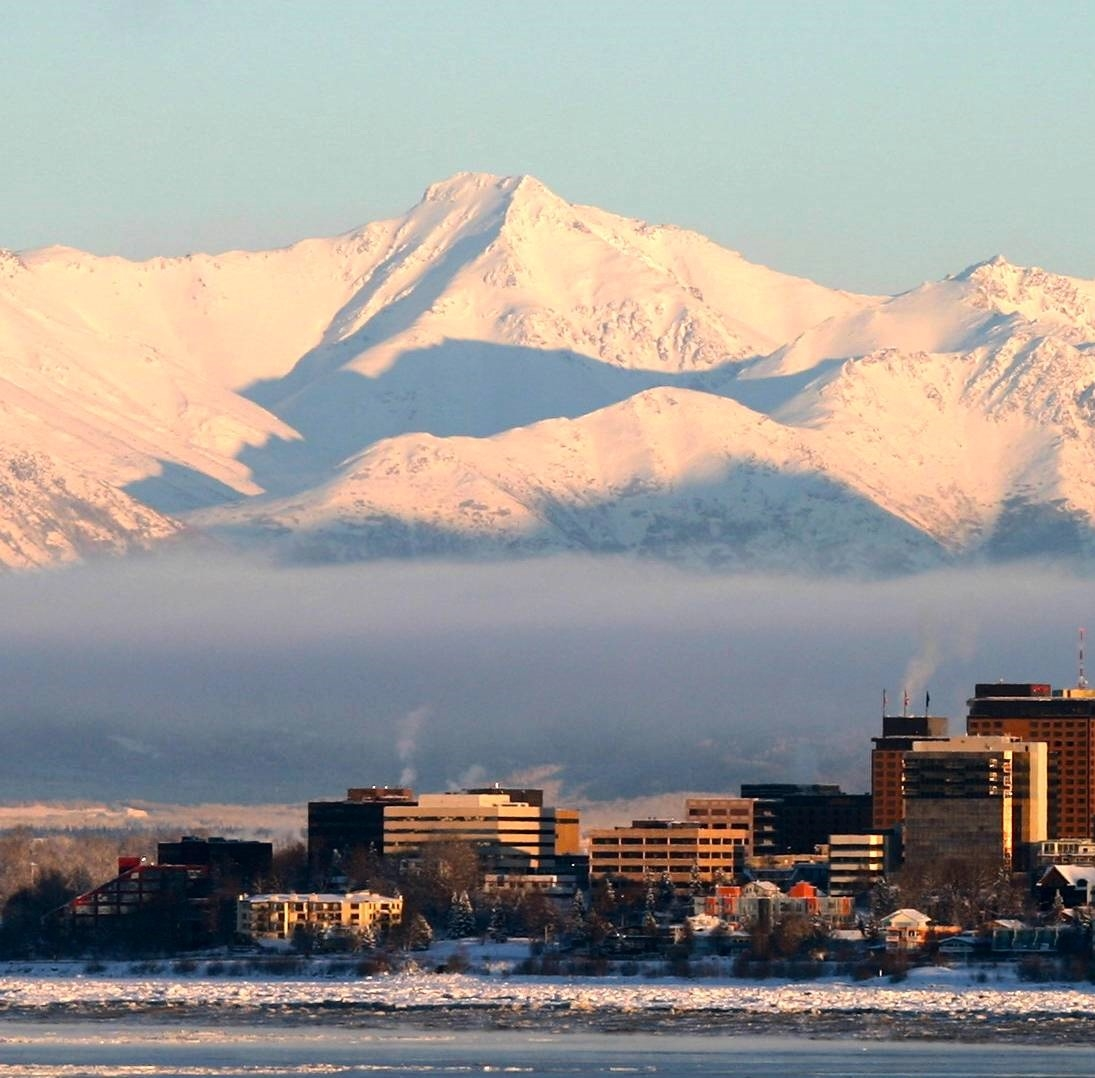
- Southwest aspect

Highest point
- Elevation: 5,019 ft (1,530 m)
- Prominence: 722 ft (220 m)
- Parent peak: Mile High Peak (5,331 ft)
- Isolation: 1.40 mi (2.25 km)
- Coordinates: 61°19′52″N 149°22′50″W

Geography
- Location within Alaska
- Interactive map of Vista Peak
- Country: United States
- State: Alaska
- Borough: Anchorage
- Protected area: Chugach State Park
- Parent range: Chugach Mountains
- Topo map: USGS Anchorage B-7

Vista Peak is a 5,019-foot (1,530 m) mountain summit in the U.S. state of Alaska.

== Description ==
Vista Peak is located 20 miles (32 km) northeast of Anchorage in the western Chugach Mountains and within Chugach State Park. Precipitation runoff from the mountain drains to Knik Arm via Peters Creek and Eagle River. Although modest in elevation, relief is significant as the summit rises approximately 3,400 feet (1,036 m) above Peters Creek in 2.5 miles (4.0 km) and 4,600 feet (1,400 m) above Eagle River in four miles (6.4 km). An ascent of the summit involves hiking six miles with 3,980 feet of elevation gain. The months of May through September offer the best time for climbing the peak. The mountain's toponym appears on USGS maps, but it has not been officially adopted by the United States Board on Geographic Names.

== Climate ==
Based on the Köppen climate classification, Vista Peak is located in a subarctic climate zone with long, cold, snowy winters, and mild summers. Weather systems coming off the Gulf of Alaska are forced upwards by the Chugach Mountains (orographic lift), causing heavy precipitation in the form of rainfall and snowfall. Winter temperatures can drop below −10 °F with wind chill factors below −20 °F.

== Gallery ==
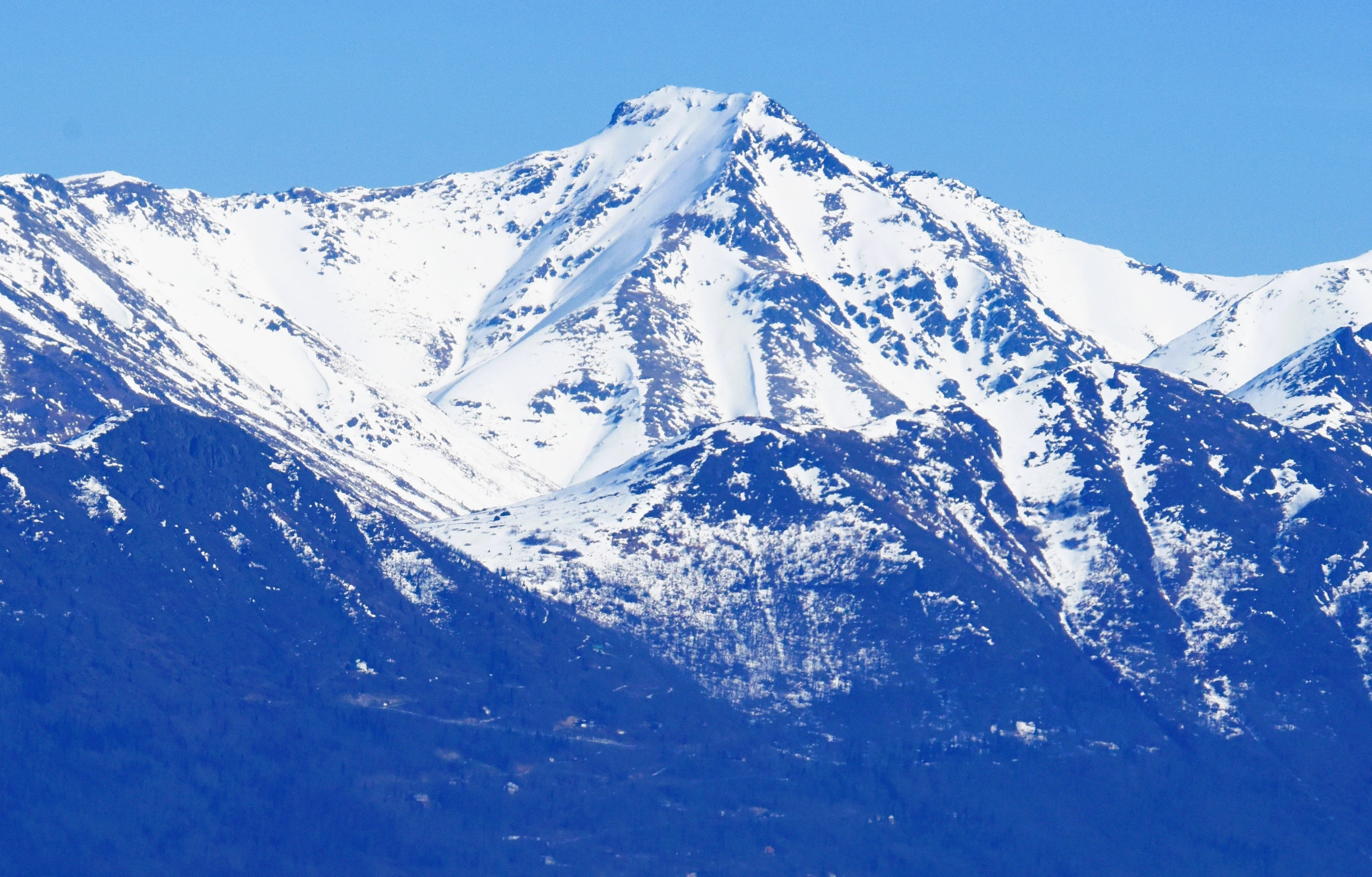
West aspect seen from Elmendorf Air Force Base

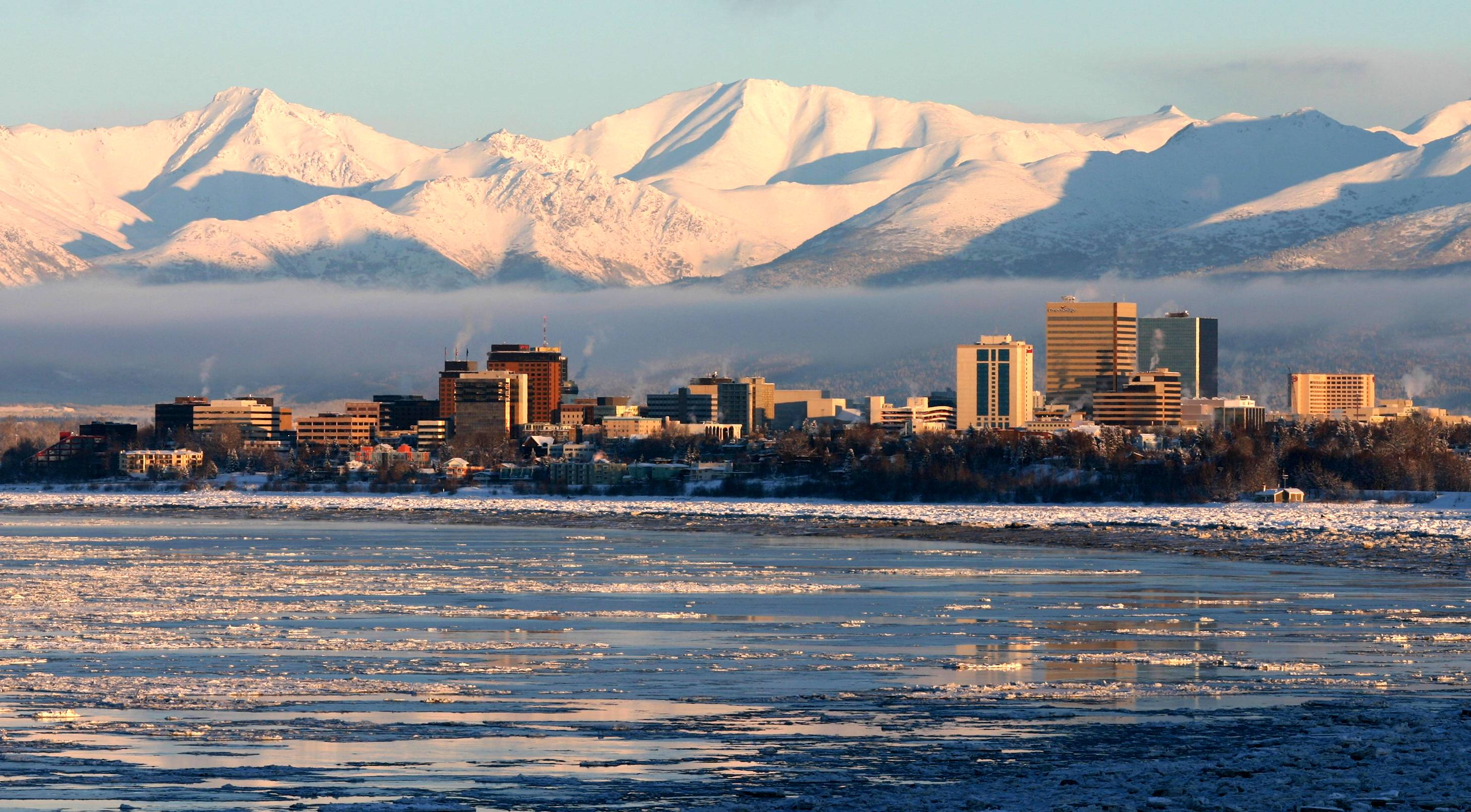
Anchorage, with Vista Peak in upper left, and Mile High Peak centered at top

== See also ==
- List of mountain peaks of Alaska
- Geography of Alaska
