= Mile High Peak =

Mountain in Alaska, United States

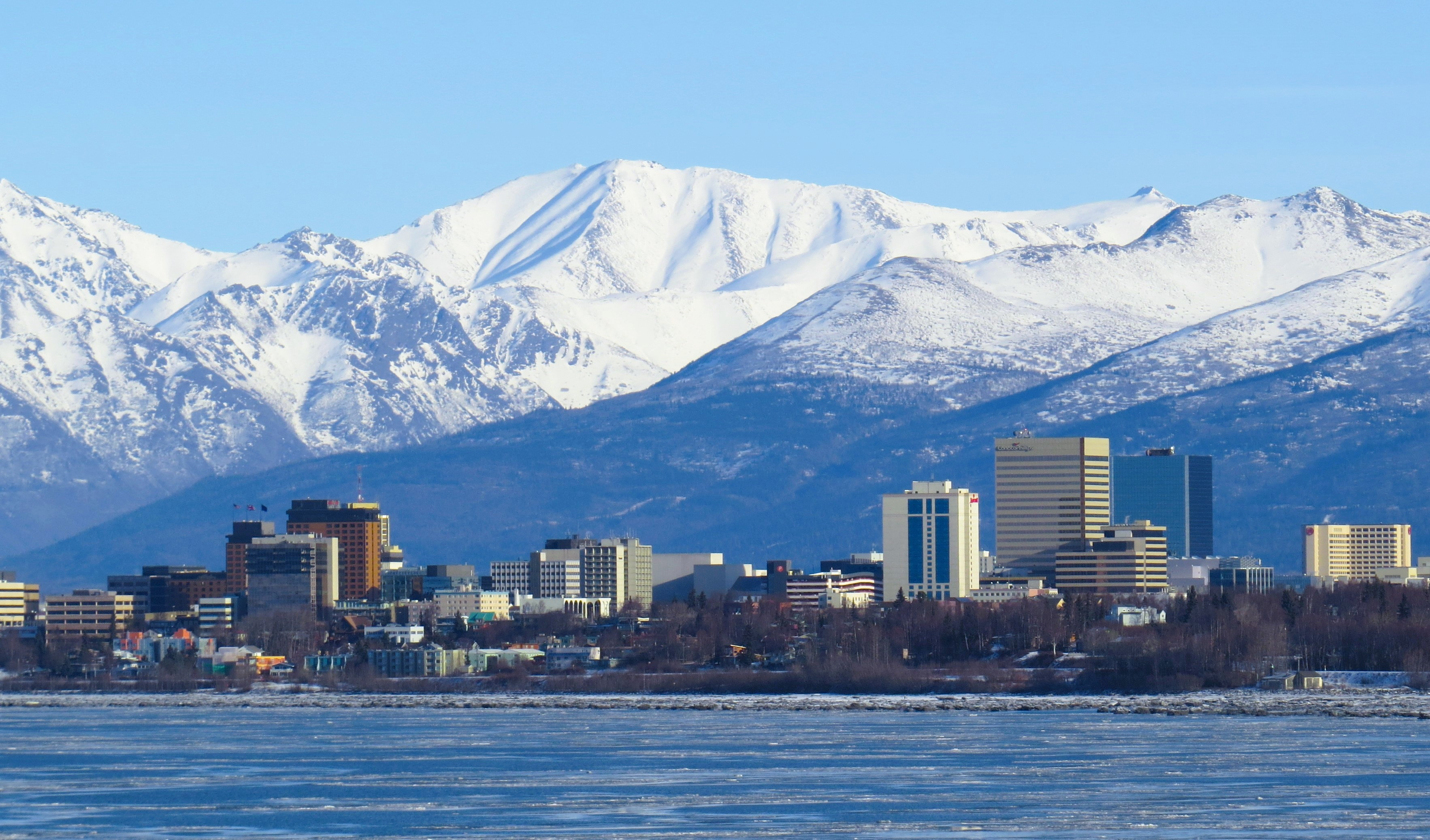
- Mile High Peak and Anchorage

Highest point
- Elevation: 5,331 ft (1,625 m)
- Prominence: 574 ft (175 m)
- Parent peak: Mount Significant (5,456 ft)
- Isolation: 2.19 mi (3.52 km)
- Coordinates: 61°19′01″N 149°21′02″W

Geography
- Location within Alaska
- Interactive map of Mile High Peak
- Country: United States
- State: Alaska
- Borough: Anchorage
- Protected area: Chugach State Park
- Parent range: Chugach Mountains
- Topo map: USGS Anchorage B-7

Mile High Peak is a 5,331-foot (1,625 m) mountain summit in the U.S. state of Alaska.

== Description ==
Mile High Peak is located 20 miles (32 km) northeast of Anchorage in the western Chugach Mountains and within Chugach State Park. Precipitation runoff from the mountain drains to Knik Arm via Peters Creek and Eagle River. Although modest in elevation, relief is significant as the summit rises approximately 3,700 feet (1,128 m) above Peters Creek in 2.5 miles (4.0 km) and 4,900 feet (1,493 m) above Eagle River in three miles (4.8 km). The mountain's toponym has not been officially adopted by the United States Board on Geographic Names. In 1953, Mrs. Ollie A. Trower of Anchorage proposed that this mountain be named "Mt. Magnificent," however confusion led to a smaller peak two miles west being officially adopted as Mount Magnificent.

== Climate ==
Based on the Köppen climate classification, Mile High Peak is located in a subarctic climate zone with long, cold, snowy winters, and mild summers. Weather systems coming off the Gulf of Alaska are forced upwards by the Chugach Mountains (orographic lift), causing heavy precipitation in the form of rainfall and snowfall. Winter temperatures can drop below −10 °F with wind chill factors below −20 °F.

== Gallery ==
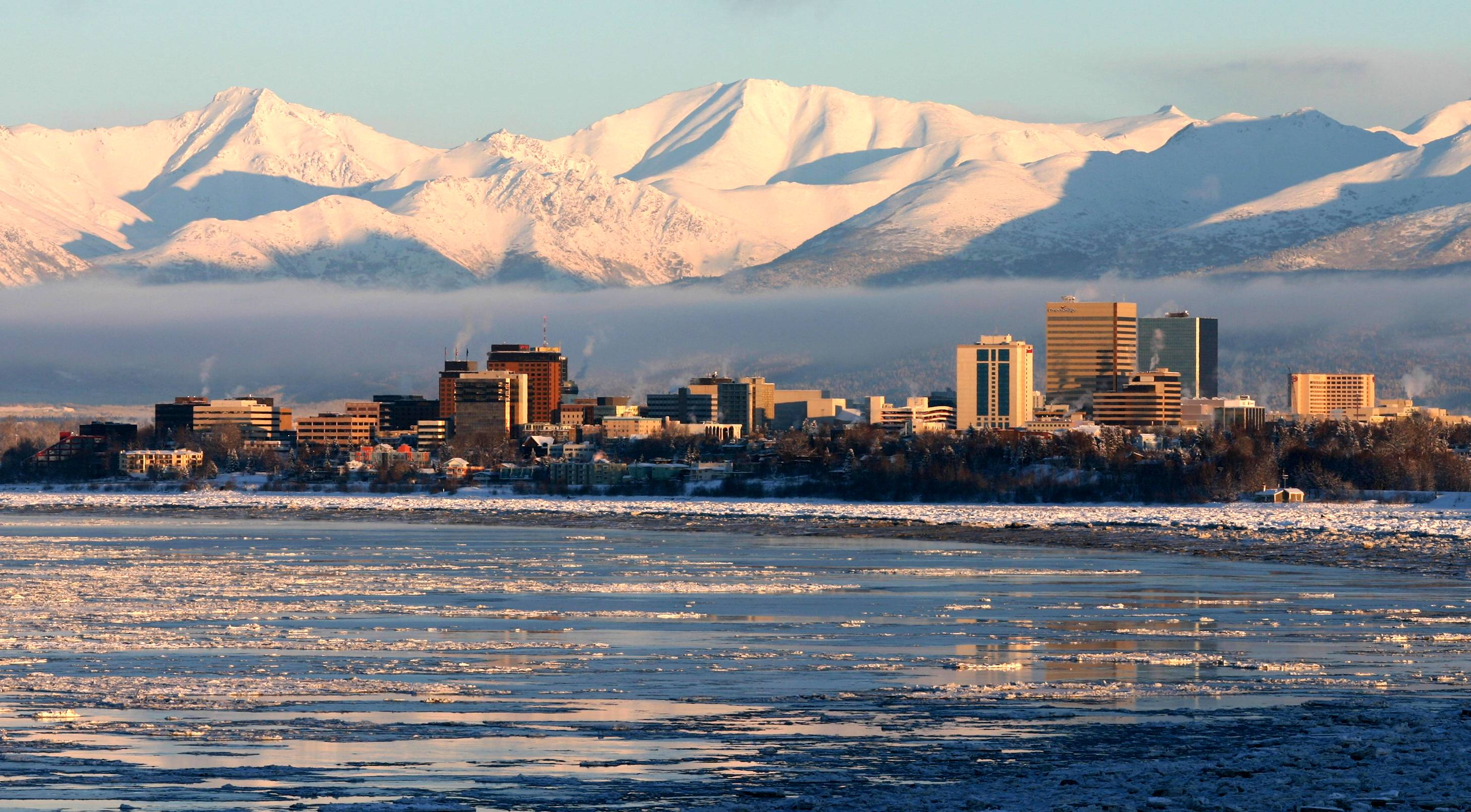
Anchorage, with Vista Peak in upper left, and Mile High Peak centered at top

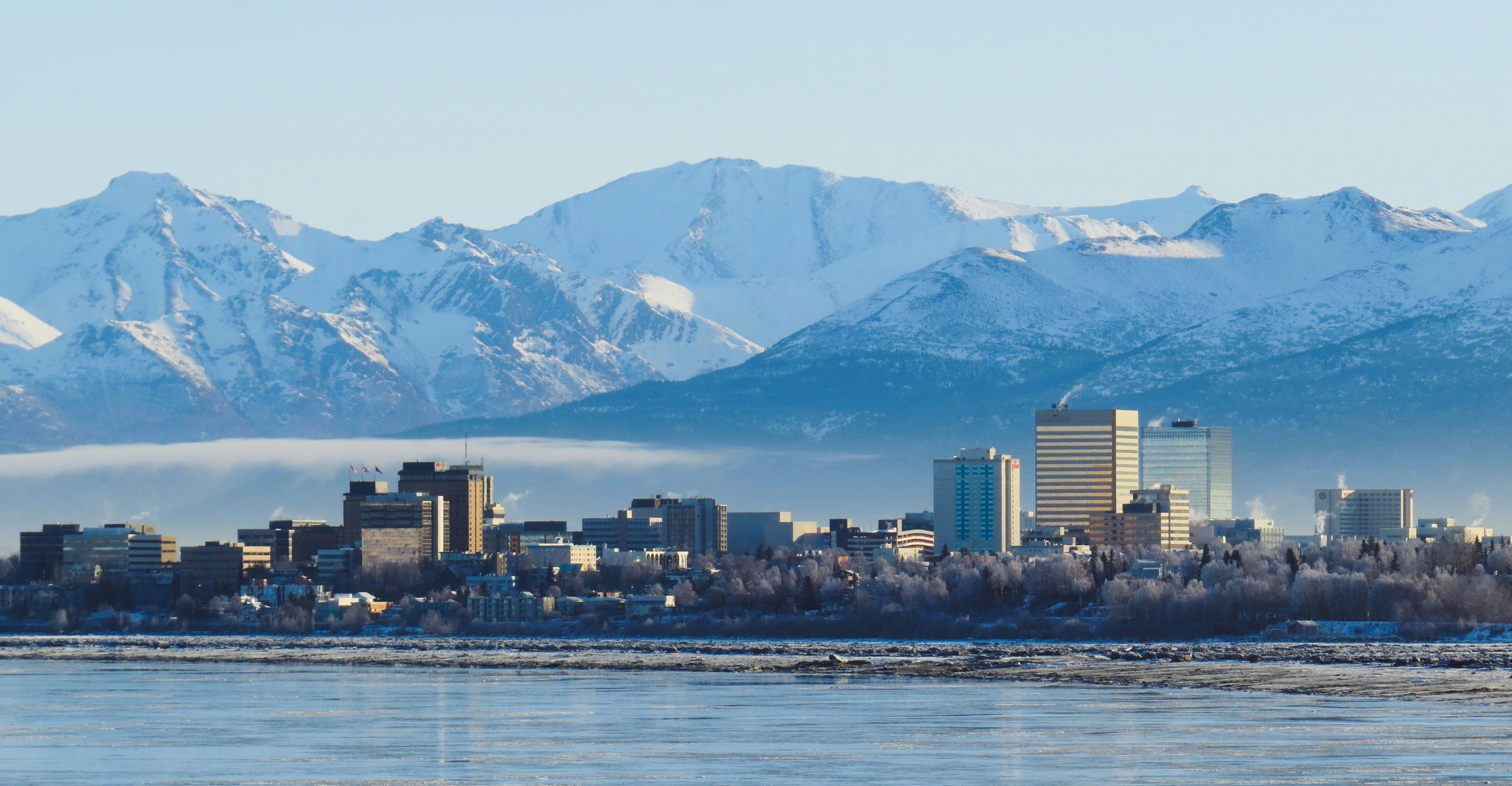
Mile High Peak and Anchorage

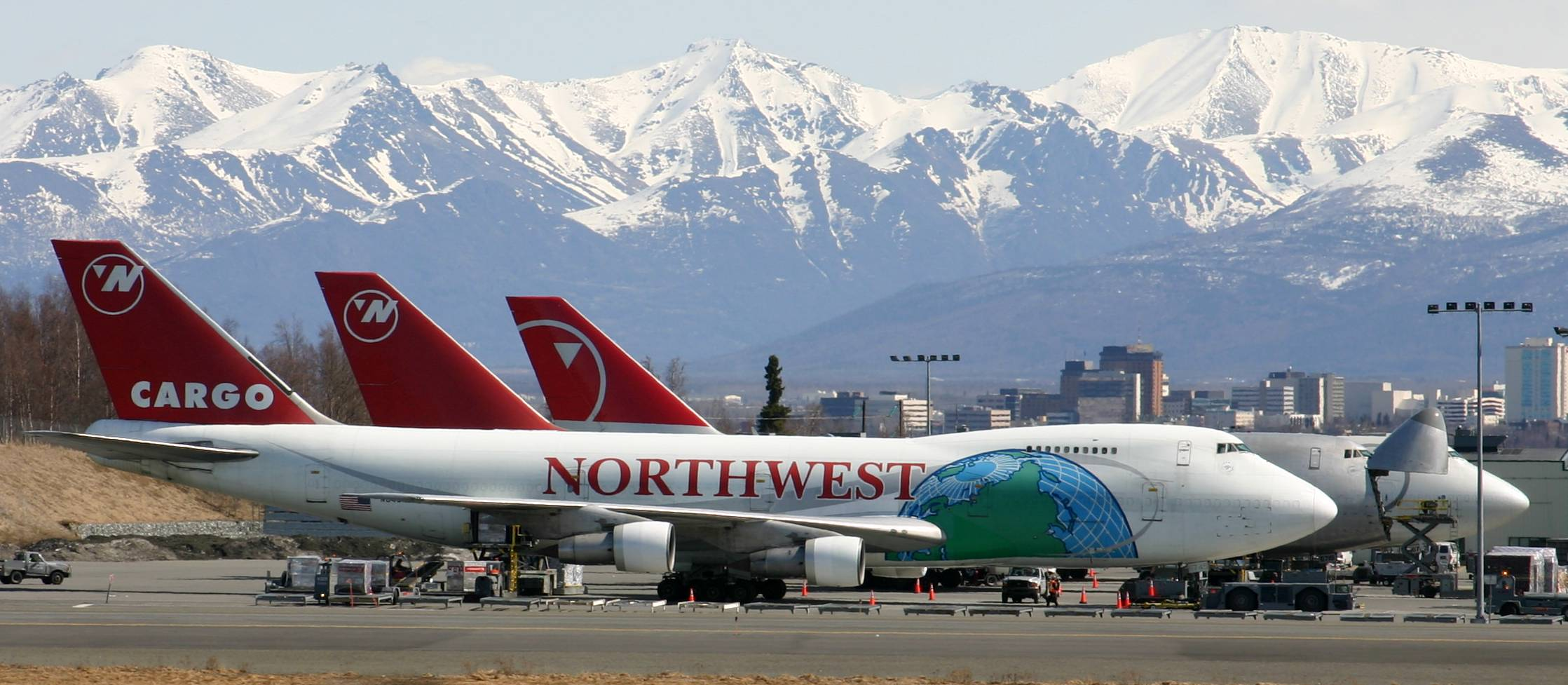
Vista Peak centered at top, and Mile High Peak in upper right

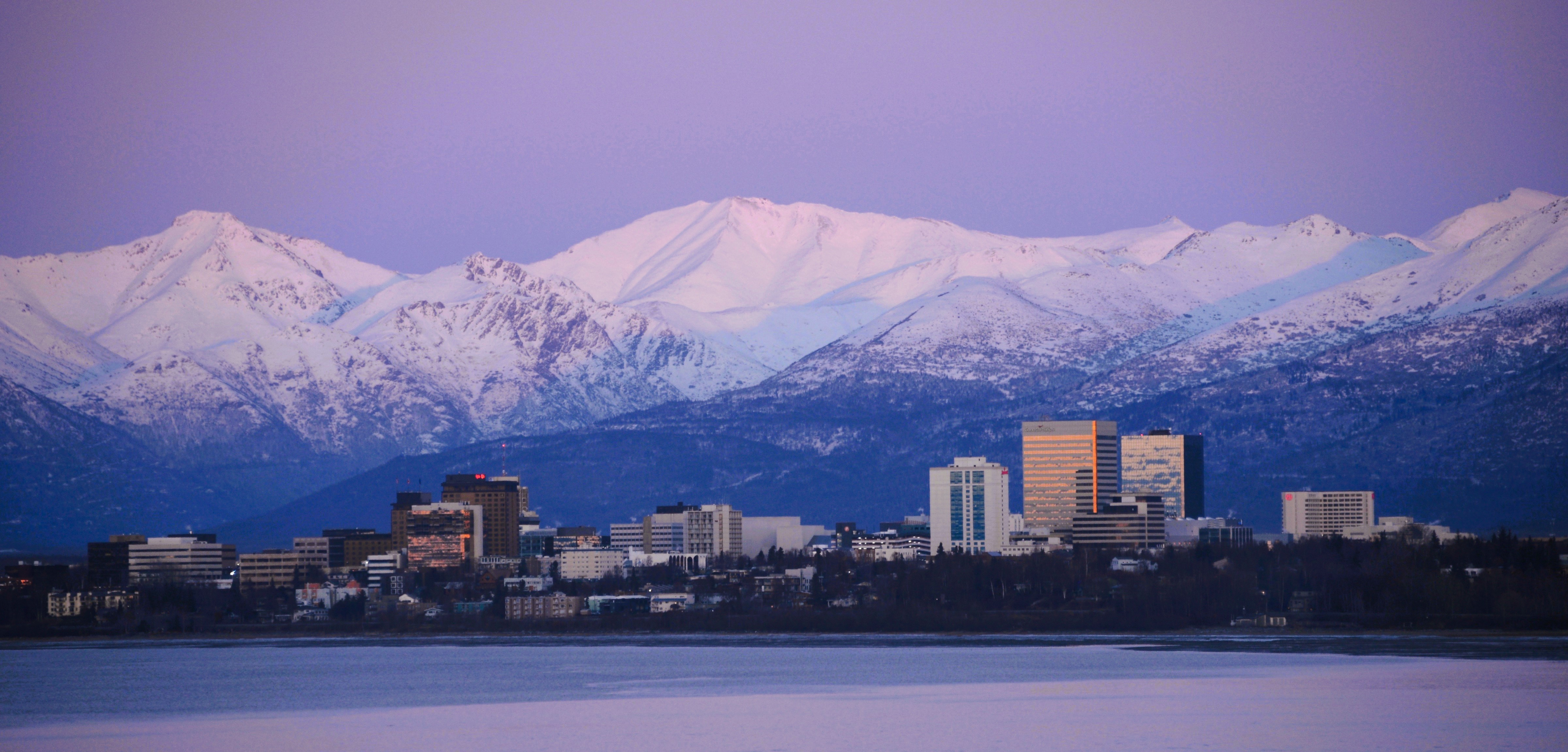
Mile High Peak and downtown Anchorage at sunset

== See also ==
- List of mountain peaks of Alaska
- Geography of Alaska
