= Pyramid Peak (Alaska) =

Mountain in Alaska, United States

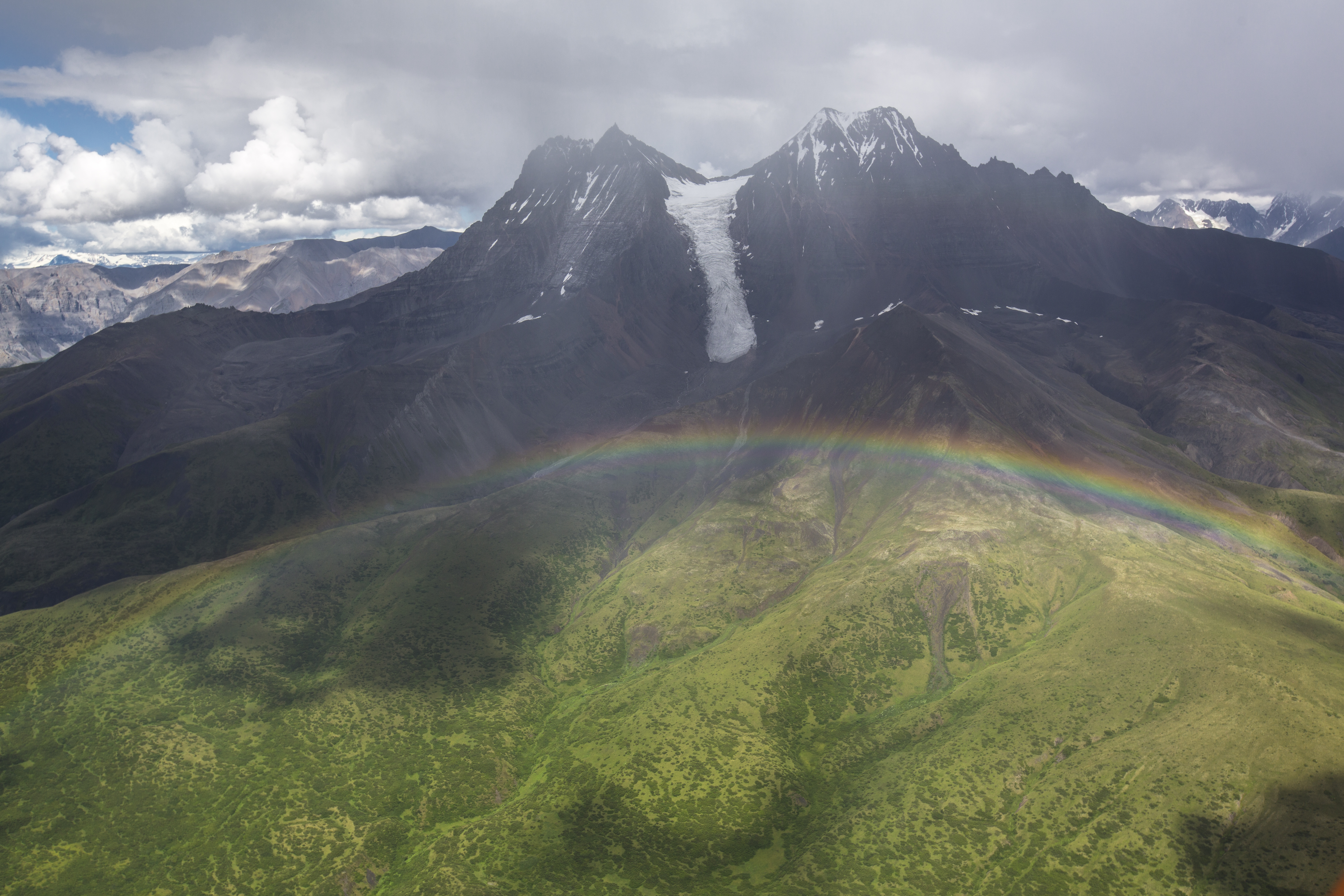
- Pyramid Peak (left) with Peak 8910; Aerial view from the south

Highest point
- Elevation: 8,875 ft (2,705 m)
- Prominence: 725 ft (221 m)
- Parent peak: Peak 8910
- Isolation: 0.63 mi (1.01 km)
- Coordinates: 61°18′25″N 142°19′48″W

Geography
- Location within Alaska
- Interactive map of Pyramid Peak
- Location: Wrangell-St. Elias National Park; Copper River Census Area; Alaska, United States
- Parent range: Saint Elias Mountains
- Topo map: USGS McCarthy B-4

Pyramid Peak is an 8,875-foot (2,705-meter) mountain summit located at the western edge of the Saint Elias Mountains, in the U.S. state of Alaska. The peak is situated in Wrangell-St. Elias National Park and Preserve, 22 mi (35 km) southeast of McCarthy, 7 mi (11 km) southeast of Williams Peak, and 6 mi (10 km) south-southeast of Joshua Green Peak. The peak's descriptive local name was reported in 1908 by the United States Geological Survey. Precipitation runoff from the mountain drains into tributaries of the Nizina River, which in turn is part of the Copper River drainage basin.

== Climate ==
Based on the Köppen climate classification, Pyramid Peak is located in a subarctic climate zone with long, cold, snowy winters, and cool summers. Weather systems coming off the Gulf of Alaska are forced upwards by the Saint Elias Mountains (orographic lift), causing heavy precipitation in the form of rainfall and snowfall. Winter temperatures can drop below −20 °F with wind chill factors below −30 °F. This climate supports small unnamed glaciers on its north and south slopes. The months May through June offer the most favorable weather for viewing and climbing.

== Gallery ==
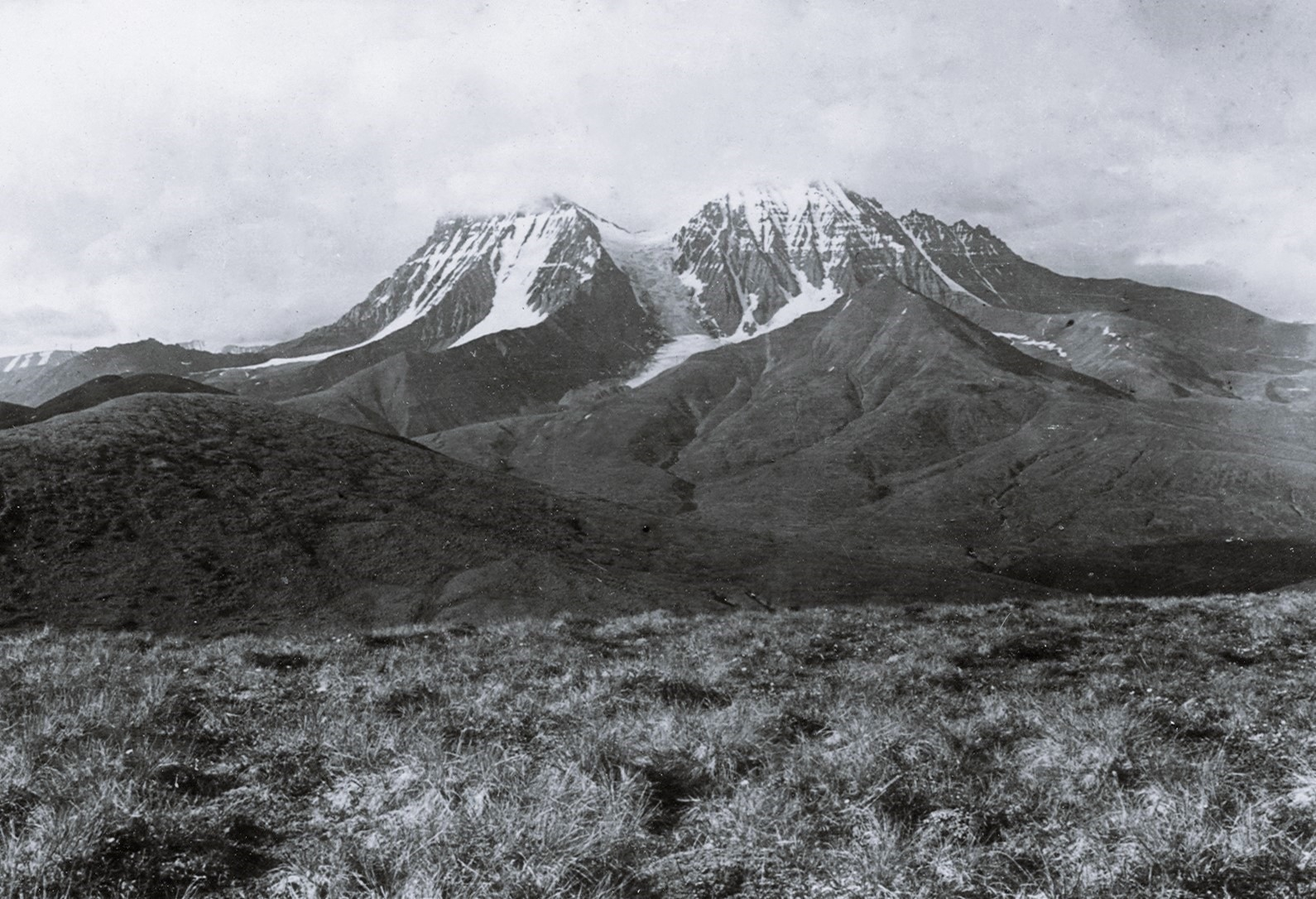
Pyramid Mountain in 1913

== See also ==
- List of mountain peaks of Alaska
- Geography of Alaska
