= Chitistone Mountain =

Mountain in Alaska

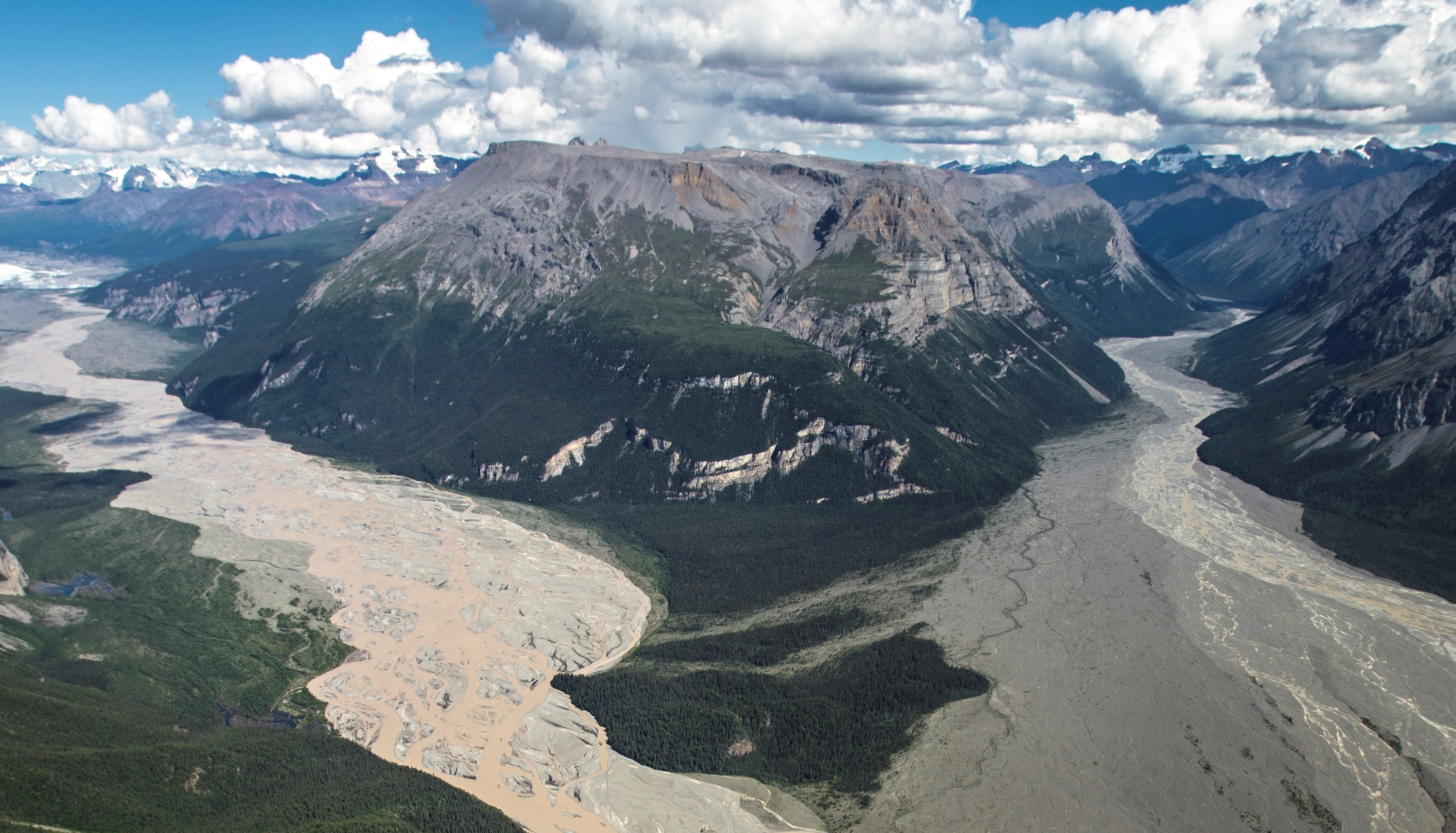
- Chitistone Mountain, southwest aspect. Nizina River (left) and Chitistone River (right).

Highest point
- Elevation: 6,844 ft (2,086 m)
- Prominence: 994 ft (303 m)
- Isolation: 3.07 mi (4.94 km)
- Coordinates: 61°29′30″N 142°28′41″W

Geography
- Location within Alaska
- Interactive map of Chitistone Mountain
- Location: Wrangell-St. Elias National Park; Copper River Census Area; Alaska, United States
- Parent range: Wrangell Mountains
- Topo map: USGS McCarthy B-4

Chitistone Mountain is a 6,844-foot (2,086-meter) mountain summit located at the southeastern edge of the Wrangell Mountains, in the U.S. state of Alaska. The peak is situated in Wrangell-St. Elias National Park and Preserve, 15 mi (24 km) east-northeast of McCarthy, 13 mi (21 km) east of Bonanza Peak, and 12 mi (19 km) north of Williams Peak, where it is wedged between the confluence of the Nizina River and Chitistone River.

The mountain takes its name from the Chitistone River as reported in 1959 by the United States Geological Survey. In turn, the Chitistone River which is part of the Copper River drainage basin, was derived from "chiti," an Indian word for copper, added to the English word "stone."

The area west of this mountain at the Kennecott Mines was actively mining copper from 1911 through 1938.

== Climate ==
Based on the Köppen climate classification, Chitistone Mountain is located in a subarctic climate zone with long, cold, snowy winters, and cool summers. Weather systems coming off the Gulf of Alaska are forced upwards by the Wrangell Mountains (orographic lift), causing heavy precipitation in the form of rainfall and snowfall. Temperatures can drop below −20 °F with wind chill factors below −30 °F. The months May through June offer the most favorable weather for viewing and climbing.

== See also ==
- Kennecott, Alaska
- Geography of Alaska
