= Young Creek =

River in Alaska, United States

Coordinates: 61.3653°N 142.7256°W

Young Creek is an east tributary of Nizina River in the U.S. state of Alaska. The stream serves as the main drainage on the north side of MacColl Ridge and flows through the Wrangell–St. Elias National Park and Preserve.

== Geography ==
The stream is about 25 miles (40 km) long and originates in the mountain mass dominated by Pyramid Peak, from which Chititu Creek, Dan Creek, and Canyon Creek receive much of their waters. The water of Young Creek derives in part from melting snow and glacier ice, and during the warm summer days is discolored with glacial silt. Young Creek occupies a glacial valley of broad U-shaped cross section. Below the big bend, where the stream turns to the west at a right angle to its upper course, Young Creek has entrenched itself in the valley floor and has cut a rather wide canyon that grows deeper and deeper downstream until, 4 miles (6.4 km) below Calamity Gulch, it attains a depth of about 500 feet (150 m). From this point westward, the canyon becomes broader and shallower till the creek reaches the bars of Nizina River.

The Nizina gold field includes the drainage basins of three southeast tributaries of the upper Nizina River—Young Creek, Chititu Creek, and Dan Creek. Young Creek is the largest of the three streams, and its crescent-shaped basin surrounds that of Chititu Creek on the east, south, and west. Calamity Gulch and Gold Run are among the tributaries of Young Creek most frequently mentioned. These flow south from the ridge whose north slope is drained by branches of White Gulch, one of the forks of Chititu Creek.

== Geology ==
The dominant bedrock of the Young Creek valley is black shale, which is cut by many dikes and sills of light-colored granitic rock and is capped in the high mountains on both sides of the valley by conglomerate and sandstone. There are also a few beds of limestone and many limestone concretions. Except for a small area of sandstone near the big bend the numerous bedrock exposures along the creek are shale or the intruded dikes. The gravel deposits of Young Creek are of three classes—highbench gravels, which lie well above the stream levels and form in part the canyon wall; low-bench gravels, which adjoin the creek channel within the canyon; and flood-plain gravels, over which the stream flows in times of high water. In addition to these deposits, which were transported and deposited chiefly by running water, or by water and ice, there is a thin veneer of morainal debris that is found throughout the valley, and even on the mountain tops. This deposit is made up of material that is in large part foreign to Young Creek and that has been transported a long distance, much of it from the upper Chitina Valley.

== See also ==
- List of rivers of Alaska
