= Williams Peak (Alaska) =

Mountain in Alaska, United States

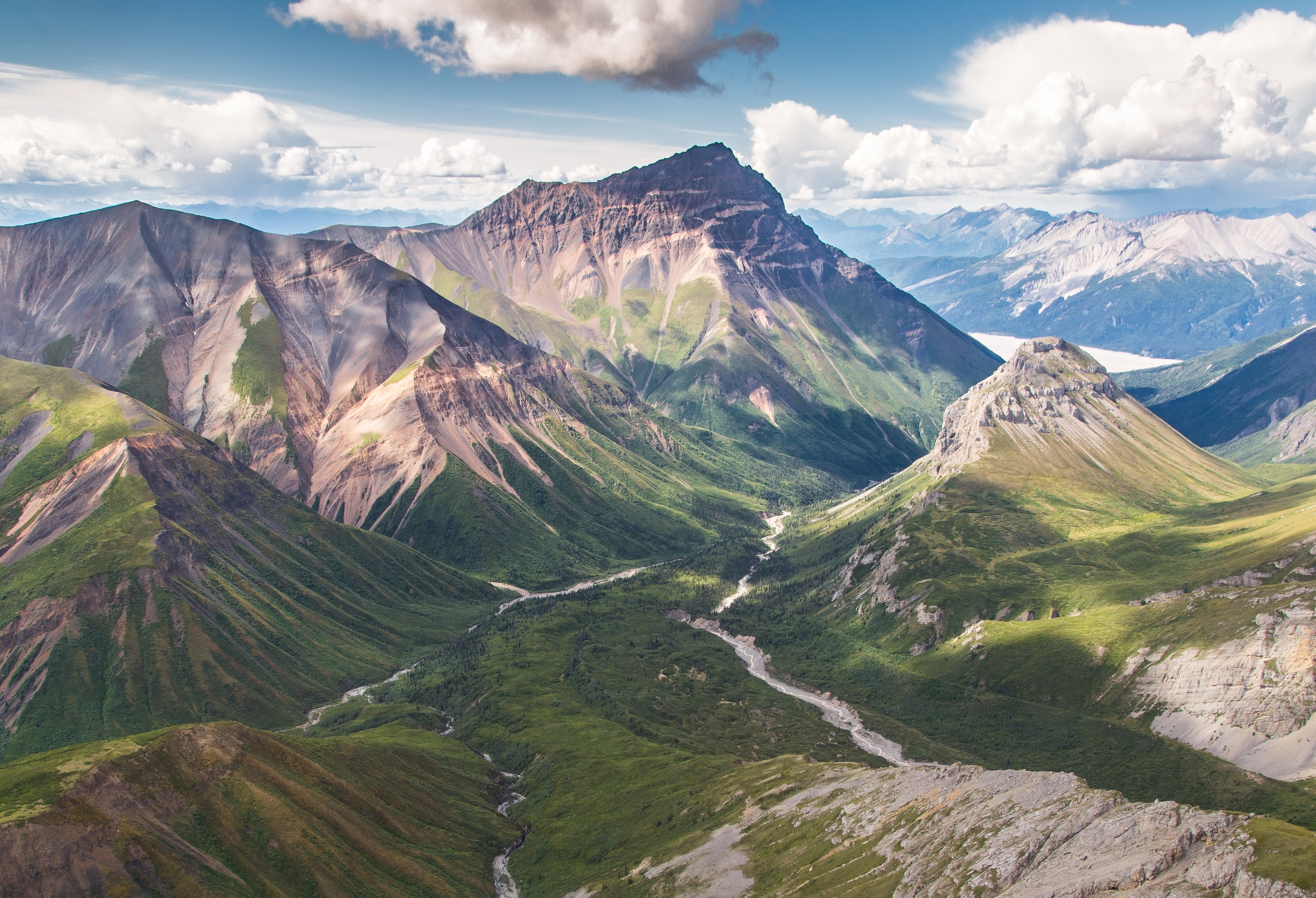
- Aerial view of east aspect

Highest point
- Elevation: 7,431 ft (2,265 m)
- Prominence: 1,800 ft (550 m)
- Parent peak: Andrus Peak
- Isolation: 3.37 mi (5.42 km)
- Coordinates: 61°21′10″N 142°30′27″W

Geography
- Location within Alaska
- Interactive map of Williams Peak
- Location: Wrangell-St. Elias National Park; Copper River Census Area; Alaska, United States
- Parent range: Saint Elias Mountains
- Topo map: USGS McCarthy B-5

Williams Peak is a 7,431-foot (2,265 meter) mountain summit located at the western edge of the Saint Elias Mountains, in the U.S. state of Alaska. The peak is situated in Wrangell-St. Elias National Park and Preserve, 15 mi (24 km) east-southeast of McCarthy, and 4 mi (6 km) west-southwest of Joshua Green Peak in the Dan Creek area. Precipitation runoff from the mountain drains into tributaries of the Nizina River, which in turn is part of the Copper River drainage basin.

== Climate ==
Based on the Köppen climate classification, Williams Peak is located in a subarctic climate zone with long, cold, snowy winters, and cool summers. Winds coming off the Gulf of Alaska are forced upwards by the Saint Elias Mountains (orographic lift), causing heavy precipitation in the form of rainfall and snowfall. Winter temperatures can drop below −20 °C with wind chill factors below −30 °C. The months May through June offer the most favorable weather for viewing and climbing.

== Gallery ==
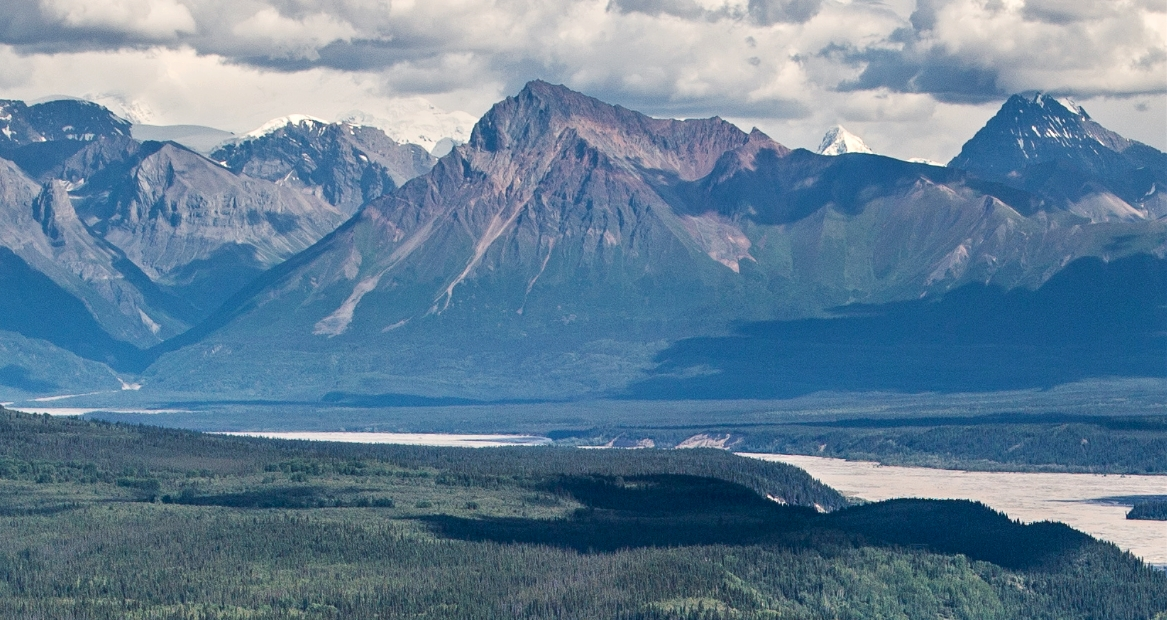
West aspect of Williams Peak (centered) with Pyramid Peak to right

== See also ==
- List of mountain peaks of Alaska
- Geography of Alaska
- Kennecott, Alaska
