= Joshua Green Peak =

Mountain in Alaska, United States

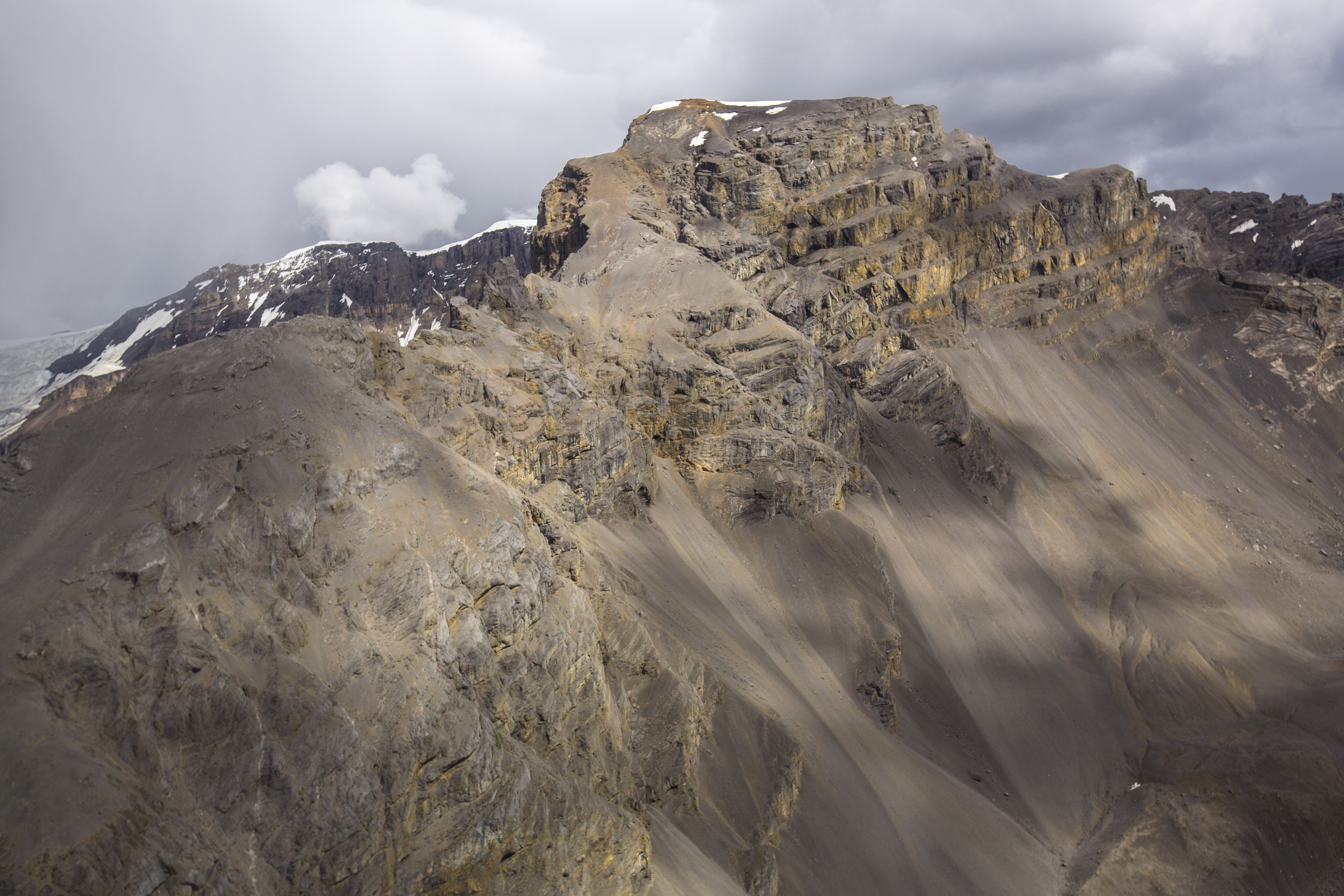
- Aerial view of south aspect

Highest point
- Elevation: 7,135 ft (2,175 m)
- Prominence: 300 ft (91 m)
- Isolation: 1.86 mi (2.99 km)
- Coordinates: 61°22′11″N 142°23′38″W

Geography
- Location within Alaska
- Interactive map of Joshua Green Peak
- Location: Wrangell-St. Elias National Park; Copper River Census Area; Alaska, United States
- Parent range: Saint Elias Mountains
- Topo map: USGS McCarthy B-4

Joshua Green Peak is a 7,135-foot (2,175 meter) mountain summit located at the western edge of the Saint Elias Mountains, in the U.S. state of Alaska. The peak is situated in Wrangell-St. Elias National Park and Preserve at the head of Dan Creek, 18 mi (29 km) east-southeast of McCarthy, and 4 mi (6 km) east-northeast of Williams Peak. The peak is named after Joshua Green (1869-1975), a Seattle businessman who through his financial backing of mining ventures was instrumental in mineral development in the Dan Creek area. The peak's name was officially adopted in 1975 by the U.S. Board on Geographic Names. Precipitation runoff from the mountain drains into Dan Creek which is a tributary of the Nizina River, which in turn is part of the Copper River drainage basin.

== Climate ==
Based on the Köppen climate classification, Joshua Green Peak is located in a subarctic climate zone with long, cold, snowy winters, and cool summers. Winds coming off the Gulf of Alaska are forced upwards by the Saint Elias Mountains (orographic lift), causing heavy precipitation in the form of rainfall and snowfall. Temperatures can drop below −20 °C with wind chill factors below −30 °C. The months May through June offer the most favorable weather for viewing and climbing.

== Gallery ==
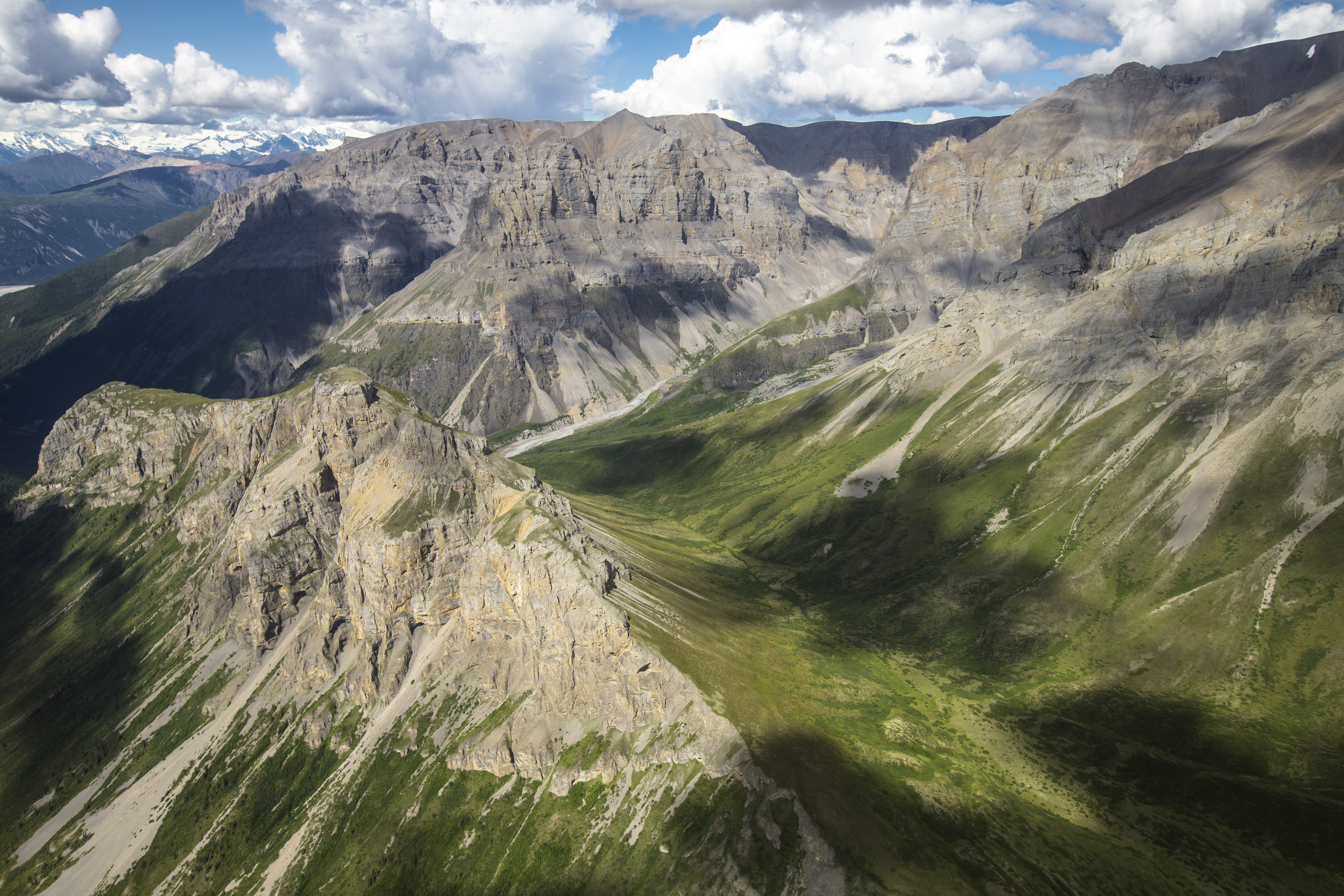
Dan Creek area: Lime Butte (lower left), Nikolai Butte, and Joshua Green Peak (right)

== See also ==
- List of mountain peaks of Alaska
- Geography of Alaska
- Kennecott, Alaska
