= Nizina River =

Tributary of the Chitina River in Alaska

Coordinates: 61.3497°N 143.2433°W

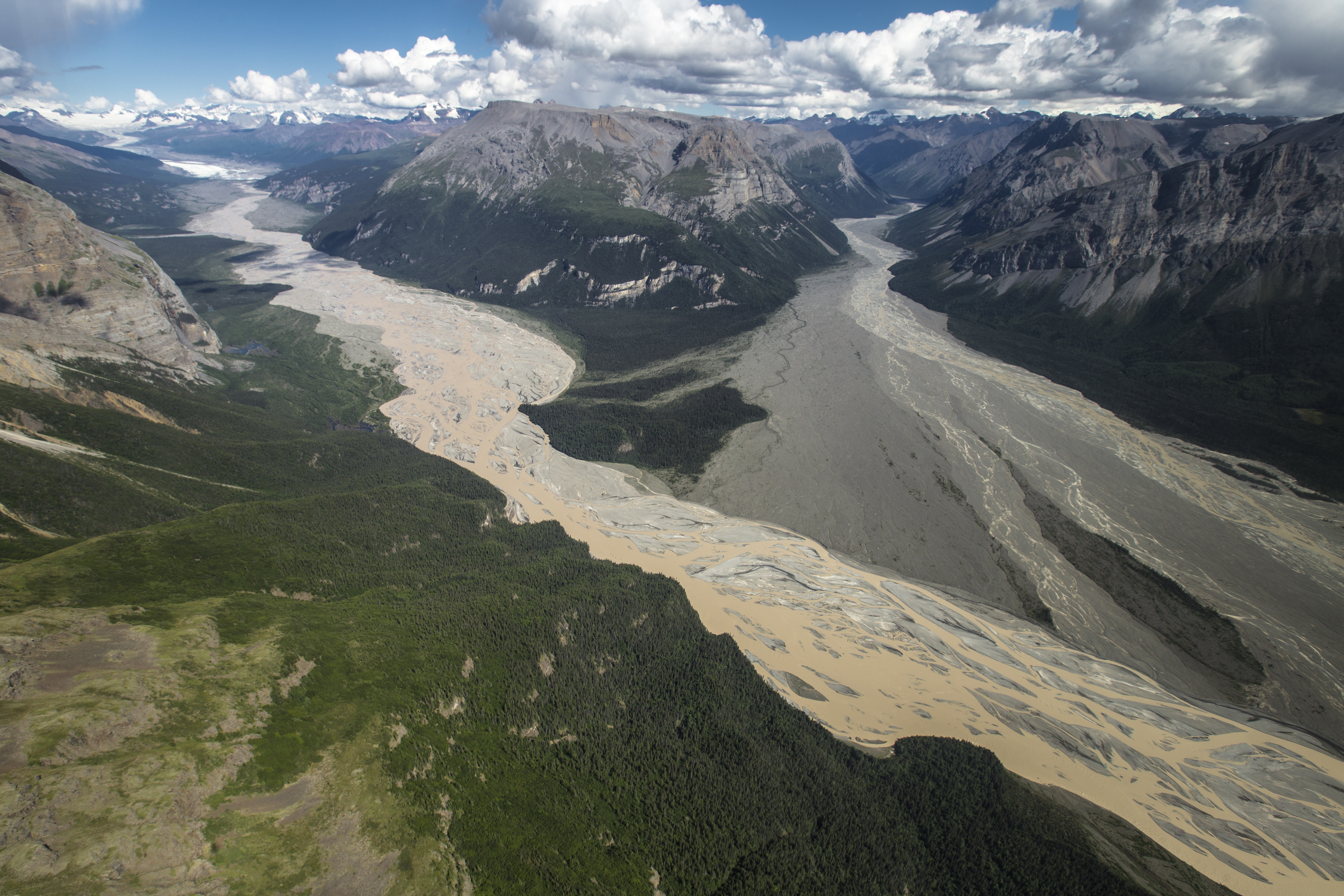
Confluence of the Nizina (left) and Chitistone Rivers with Chitistone Mountain between

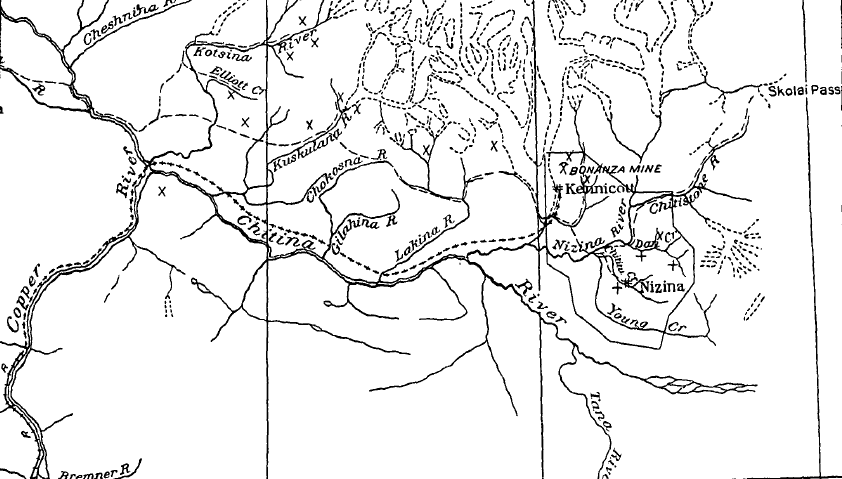
Map of the Nizina River

Nizina River is the largest tributary of the Chitina River, located in the U.S. state of Alaska. It originates within the Wrangell Mountains and flows southwest through the Wrangell–St. Elias National Park and Preserve, a vast protected area known for its glaciers and rugged terrain. The Nizina River contributes significantly to the Chitina River’s discharge, ultimately feeding into the Copper River system.

== Geography ==
The stream heads in Nizina Glacier, flows southward about 16 miles (26 km) to a point near the mouth of Dan Creek, where it takes an easterly course, which it follows for about 16 miles (26 km) to its junction with the Chitina. It drains an area of 1,240 square miles (3,200 km^{2}) and is nearly as large as the Chitina at their junction. For the first 20 miles (32 km) of its course, it flows over a gravel flood plain from 0.5–2 miles (0.80–3.22 km) wide, bordered by steep-sloped mountains 6,000–8,000 feet (1,800–2,400 m) in height. At low water, it follows one or more constantly shifting channels. At medium stage, the number of channels increases, and finally at flood height, the entire flood plain becomes covered from bank to bank with swift-flowing, muddy water carrying large quantities of sand and gravel. Below Young Creek the bordering mountains are separated by a wider valley in which the river has cut a deep trench through the gravel and shale formations. Finally, for the last 2–3 miles (3.2–4.8 km) of its course, the river flows between walls of solid rock, forming a box canyon for much of the distance. The river has an average grade of about 30 feet (9.1 m) per mile.

== Tributaries ==
Chitistone River rises in Russell Glacier near Skolai Pass, about 25 miles (40 km) northeast from its confluence with the Nizina. Its course lies in a narrow valley with steep-sloped mountains 8,000–9,000 feet (2,400–2,700 m) high on either side.

Dan and Chititu creeks are small streams that enter the Nizina from the southeast about 6 miles (9.7 km) and 8 miles (13 km), respectively, below Chitistone River. They flow past important gold placer claims. The basin of Dan Creek comprises 42 square miles (110 km^{2}) and that of Chititu Creek 27 square miles (70 km^{2}).

Young Creek, which enters the Nizina about 1 mile (1.6 km) below Chititu Creek, is about 30 miles (48 km) long and drains an area of 104 square miles (270 km^{2}). Its lower course parallels that of Chititu Creek, about which its headwaters turn, interlocking with those of Dan Creek. Neither Dan, Chititu, nor Young creek receives much, if any, glacial water. They carry large quantities of silt from the shale formation in which they have cut their channels, besides much gravel and sand from the overlying formation.

Kennicott River carries the flow from Kennicott Glacier to the Nizina River, a distance of about 4 miles (6.4 km). It is subject to extreme floods, usually one or more each year, which are caused by the clogging of the subglacial channels that open up with an immense flow after enough water has accumulated to produce sufficient pressure to force out the obstruction. The flood discharge sometimes lasts several days.

McCarthy Creek rises in small glaciers on the south slope of the Wrangell Mountains and for about 13 miles (21 km) flows southward, paralleling Kennicott Glacier, which lies 3–4 miles (4.8–6.4 km) to the west. The dividing ridge is a southern spur from the Wrangell Mountains and ranges from 6,000–7,000 feet (1,800–2,100 m) in height. McCarthy Creek then gradually bends toward the west, and for the last 3 miles (4.8 km) flows about northwest. Its total length is about 20 miles (32 km), and it enters Kennicott River at the town of McCarthy. The basin comprises 72 square miles (190 km^{2}). The principal tributaries are from the east and are the East Fork and Nikolai Creek, which enter about 10 miles (16 km) and 12 miles (19 km), respectively, below the head. Below the East Fork the stream flows between high gravel banks, meeting here and there ledges of shale and porphyry through which it has cut its way, forming small canyons. About 3 miles (4.8 km) from its mouth, as it enters the valley of the Kennicott, the flood plain broadens and averages nearly 0.25 miles (0.40 km) in width. McCarthy Creek has a rather uniform grade of about 100 feet (30 m) per mile.

== History ==
Placers were discovered in 1902. The Nizina placer district embraces in a general sense the drainage areas of Dan, Chititu, and Young creeks, which flow into Nizina River from the east and south.

== See also ==
- List of rivers of Alaska
