= Dirtseller Mountain =

Mountain in Alabama and Georgia, United States

Coordinates: 34°18′01″N 85°33′41″W

Dirtseller Mountain is a summit in the U.S. states of Alabama and Georgia. Its elevation is 1,201 feet (366 m).

The mountain's English name accurately preserves its native Cherokee-language name.
