= List of mountain peaks of Washington =

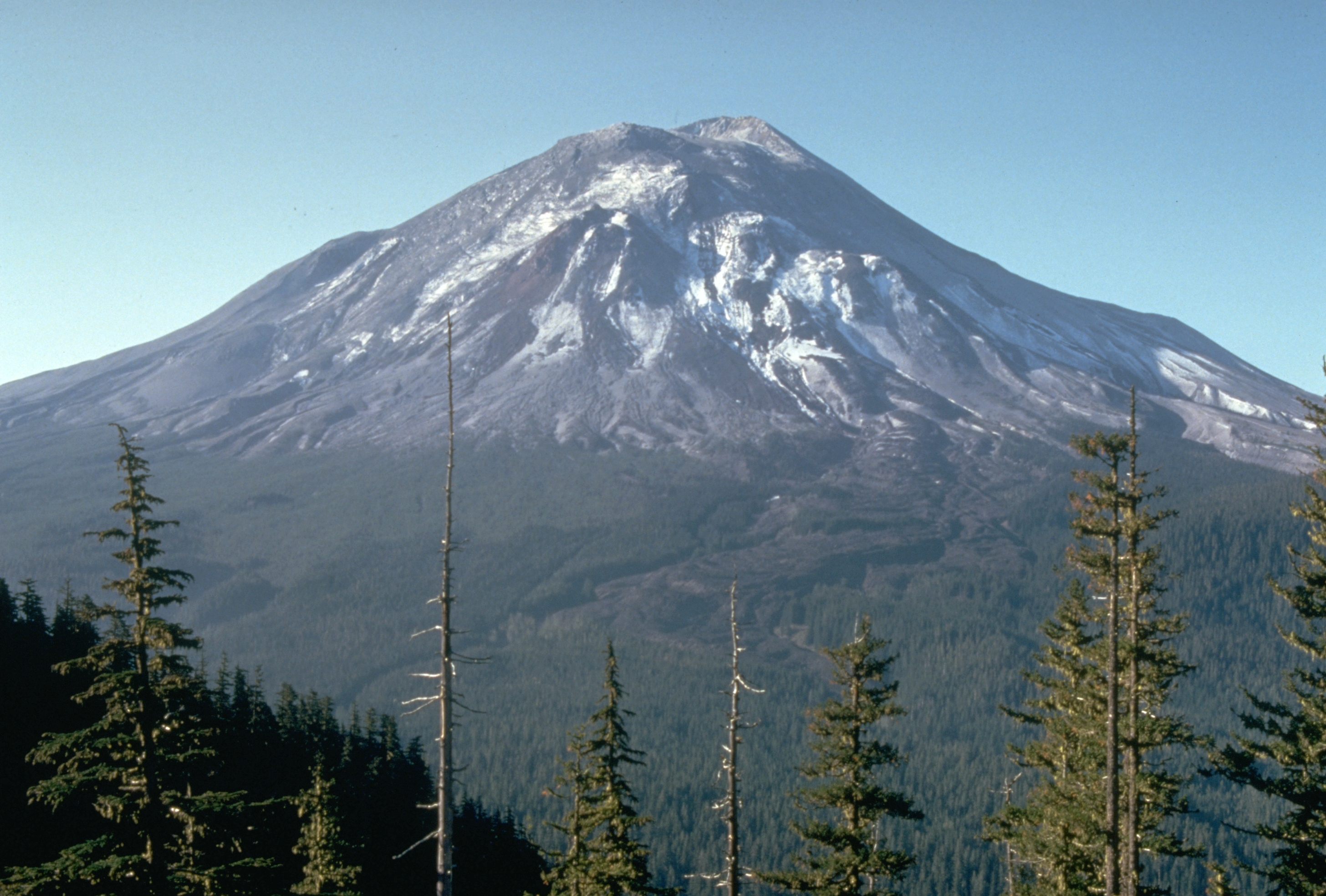
The day before its 1980 eruption, Mount St. Helens was the fifth highest major summit of Washington.

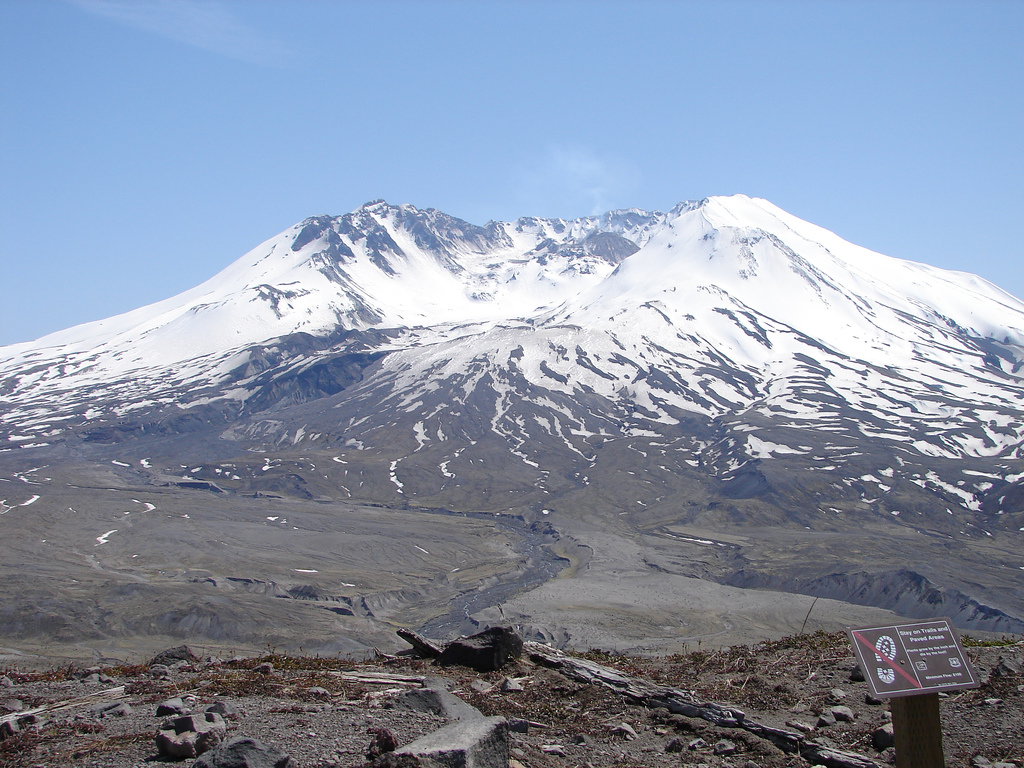
Today, Mount St. Helens is the 35th highest major summit of the state.

This article comprises three sortable tables of major mountain peaks of the U.S. State of Washington.

The summit of a mountain or hill may be measured in three principal ways:

1. The topographic elevation of a summit measures the height of the summit above a geodetic sea level. The first table below ranks the 100 highest major summits of Washington by elevation.
2. The topographic prominence of a summit is a measure of how high the summit rises above its surroundings. The second table below ranks the 50 most prominent summits of Washington.
3. The topographic isolation (or radius of dominance) of a summit measures how far the summit lies from its nearest point of equal elevation. The third table below ranks the 25 most isolated major summits of Washington.

== Highest major summits ==
Of the major summits of the State of Washington, Mount Rainier exceeds 4000 meters (13,123 feet) elevation, four peaks exceed 3000 meters (9843 feet) elevation, and 97 peaks exceed 2000 meters (6562 feet) elevation.

The 100 highest summits of Washington with at least 500 meters of topographic prominence
Rank	Mountain peak	Mountain range	Elevation	Prominence	Isolation	Location	First ascent (Note: First recorded ascents. Sources: for Castle Peak (8311 ft) and higher the years are copied from John Roper's carefully curated list. Years for lower mountains in the Cascades mainly come from the Cascade Alpine Guides and in the Olympic mountains from Steph Abegg's list.)
1	Mount Rainier (Tahoma) (Note: The summit of Mount Rainier (Tahoma) is the highest point of the Cascade Range and the U.S. State of Washington. Mount Rainier is the most prominent summit in the contiguous United States and the fourth most prominent in North America.) (Note: The elevation of Mount Rainier (Tahoma) includes an adjustment of +1.914 m (6.28 ft) from NGVD 29 to NAVD 88.)	Mount Rainier Area	14,417 ft 4394.3 m	13,246 ft 4037 m	731 mi 1,177 km	46.8529°N 121.7604°W	1870 (Note: Or perhaps as early as 1858 by two unidentified miners)
2	Mount Adams (Pahto)	Mount Adams Area	12,281 ft 3743.4 m	8,136 ft 2480 m	45.8 mi 73.6 km	46.2024°N 121.4909°W	1894
3	Mount Baker (Kulshan) (Note: The summit of Mount Baker (Kulshan) is the highest point of the northern Cascade Range.) (Note: The elevation of Mount Baker (Kulshan) includes an adjustment of +1.43 m (4.69 ft) from NGVD 29 to NAVD 88.)	Skagit Range	10,786 ft 3287 m	8,845 ft 2696 m	131.5 mi 212 km	48.7768°N 121.8145°W	1868
4	Glacier Peak (DaKobed) (Note: The elevation of Glacier Peak (DaKobed) includes an adjustment of +1.492 m (4.9 ft) from NGVD 29 to NAVD 88.)	Glacier Peak Area	10,545 ft 3214 m	7,518 ft 2291 m	56 mi 90.2 km	48.1125°N 121.1138°W	1897
	Mount Saint Helens before 1980 eruption	Mount Saint Helens Area	9,678 ft 2950 m	5,937 ft 1810 m	32 mi 51.5 km	46.1970°N 122.1910°W	1853
5	Bonanza Peak (Note: The elevation of Bonanza Peak includes an adjustment of +1.436 m (4.71 ft) from NGVD 29 to NAVD 88.)	Central North Cascades	9,516 ft 2900 m	3,731 ft 1137 m	14.4 mi 23.2 km	48.2382°N 120.8664°W	1937
6	Mount Stuart (Note: The summit of Mount Stuart is the highest point of the Wenatchee Mountains.) (Note: The elevation of Mount Stuart includes an adjustment of +1.388 m (4.55 ft) from NGVD 29 to NAVD 88.)	Wenatchee Mountains	9,420 ft 2871 m	5,354 ft 1632 m	44.5 mi 71.6 km	47.4751°N 120.9024°W	1873 or 1883
7	Mount Fernow (Note: The summit of Mount Fernow is the highest point of the Entiat Mountains.) (Note: The elevation of Mount Fernow includes an adjustment of +1.456 m (4.78 ft) from NGVD 29 to NAVD 88.)	Entiat Mountains	9,254 ft 2821 m	2,811 ft 857 m	5.9 mi 9.49 km	48.1625°N 120.8075°W	1933
8	Goode Mountain (Note: The elevation of Goode Mountain includes an adjustment of +1.364 m (4.48 ft) from NGVD 29 to NAVD 88.)	Central North Cascades	9,224 ft 2812 m	3,828 ft 1167 m	17.02 mi 27.4 km	48.4831°N 120.9115°W	1936
9	Mount Shuksan (Note: The elevation of Mount Shuksan includes an adjustment of +1.339 m (4.39 ft) from NGVD 29 to NAVD 88.)	Skagit Range	9,135 ft 2784 m	4,431 ft 1351 m	10.36 mi 16.68 km	48.8315°N 121.6032°W	1897 or 1906
10	Buckner Mountain (Note: The elevation of Buckner Mountain includes an adjustment of +1.414 m (4.64 ft) from NGVD 29 to NAVD 88.)	Central North Cascades	9,119 ft 2779 m	3,054 ft 931 m	4.13 mi 6.65 km	48.4943°N 120.9999°W	1901
11	Jack Mountain (Note: The summit of Jack Mountain is the highest point of the Hozameen Range.)	Hozameen Range	9,075 ft 2766 m	4,211 ft 1284 m	16.32 mi 26.3 km	48.7728°N 120.9562°W	1904
12	Mount Spickard	Skagit Range	8,980 ft 2737.2 m	4,799 ft 1463 m	18.78 mi 30.2 km	48.9697°N 121.2405°W	1904
13	Black Peak (Note: The elevation of Black Peak includes an adjustment of +1.392 m (4.57 ft) from NGVD 29 to NAVD 88.)	Central North Cascades	8,975 ft 2735 m	3,470 ft 1058 m	5.19 mi 8.36 km	48.5236°N 120.8162°W	1926
14	Mount Redoubt (Note: The elevation of Mount Redoubt includes an adjustment of +1.412 m (4.63 ft) from NGVD 29 to NAVD 88.)	Skagit Range	8,974 ft 2735 m	1,669 ft 509 m	2.86 mi 4.61 km	48.9578°N 121.3007°W	1930
15	North Gardner Mountain (Note: The summit of North Gardner Mountain is the highest point of the Methow Mountains.) (Note: The elevation of North Gardner Mountain includes an adjustment of +1.425 m (4.68 ft) from NGVD 29 to NAVD 88.)	Central North Cascades	8,961 ft 2731 m	4,016 ft 1224 m	14.42 mi 23.2 km	48.5152°N 120.5017°W	1925
16	Dome Peak (Note: The summit of Dome Peak is the highest point of Ptarmigan Crest.) (Note: The elevation of Dome Peak includes an adjustment of +1.422 m (4.67 ft) from NGVD 29 to NAVD 88.)	Central North Cascades	8,945 ft 2726 m	3,080 ft 939 m	8.46 mi 13.61 km	48.3034°N 121.0295°W	1936
17	Silver Star Mountain (Note: The elevation of Silver Star Mountain includes an adjustment of +1.432 m (4.7 ft) from NGVD 29 to NAVD 88.)	Methow Mountains	8,881 ft 2707 m	2,456 ft 749 m	4.45 mi 7.16 km	48.5479°N 120.5851°W	1926
18	Eldorado Peak (Note: The elevation of Eldorado Peak includes an adjustment of +1.382 m (4.53 ft) from NGVD 29 to NAVD 88.)	Central North Cascades	8,873 ft 2704 m	2,205 ft 672 m	5.36 mi 8.63 km	48.5374°N 121.1345°W	1933
19	Dragontail Peak (Note: The elevation of Dragontail Peak includes an adjustment of +1.379 m (4.52 ft) from NGVD 29 to NAVD 88.)	Wenatchee Mountains	8,865 ft 2702 m	1,800 ft 549 m	3.11 mi 5 km	47.4789°N 120.8332°W	1937
20	Oval Peak (Note: The summit of Oval Peak is the highest point of Sawtooth Ridge.)	Methow Mountains	8,807 ft 2684.5 m	2,731 ft 832 m	15.47 mi 24.9 km	48.2872°N 120.4251°W	1989
21	Mesahchie Peak	Central North Cascades	8,799 ft 2682 m	2,255 ft 687 m	3.84 mi 6.18 km	48.5786°N 120.8803°W	1966
22	Fortress Mountain	Glacier Peak Area	8,763 ft 2671 m	1,720 ft 524 m	5.49 mi 8.84 km	48.1598°N 120.9332°W	1921 or 1944
23	Mount Lago (Note: The summit of Mount Lago is the highest point of the Okanogan Range.) (Note: The elevation of Mount Lago includes an adjustment of +1.472 m (4.83 ft) from NGVD 29 to NAVD 88.)	Okanogan Range	8,750 ft 2667 m	3,268 ft 996 m	19.52 mi 31.4 km	48.8293°N 120.5374°W	1925
24	Robinson Mountain	Okanogan Range	8,730 ft 2661 m	1,706 ft 520 m	7.28 mi 11.72 km	48.7268°N 120.5751°W	1904
25	Remmel Mountain (Note: The summit of Remmel Mountain is the highest point of the Cathedral Range.)	Okanogan Range	8,691 ft 2649.16 m	4,385 ft 1337 m	16.83 mi 27.1 km	48.9234°N 120.1968°W	1904
26	Martin Peak	Central North Cascades	8,510 ft 2594 m	2,131 ft 650 m	1.95 mi 3.14 km	48.2417°N 120.8158°W	1936
27	Big Craggy Peak	Okanogan Range	8,474 ft 2583 m	3,090 ft 942 m	10.02 mi 16.13 km	48.7630°N 120.3280°W	1960 ?
28	Pinnacle Mountain	Chelan Mountains	8,468 ft 2581 m	1,760 ft 536 m	1.87 mi 3.01 km	48.1321°N 120.6705°W	1948
28	Lost Peak	Okanogan Range	8,468 ft 2581 m	1,644 ft 501 m	3.61 mi 5.81 km	48.8129°N 120.4583°W	1925
30	Tower Mountain	Okanogan Range	8,445 ft 2574 m	2,904 ft 885 m	5.87 mi 9.45 km	48.5885°N 120.7042°W	1913
31	Azurite Peak	Okanogan Range	8,402 ft 2561 m	1,920 ft 585 m	5.24 mi 8.43 km	48.6573°N 120.7521°W	1933
32	Reynolds Peak	Methow Mountains	8,383 ft 2555 m	2,052 ft 625 m	8.55 mi 13.76 km	48.3723°N 120.5630°W	1898
33	Devore Peak	Central North Cascades	8,363 ft 2549 m	1,742 ft 531 m	3.36 mi 5.41 km	48.2768°N 120.7653°W	1940
34	Snowfield Peak	Central North Cascades	8,350 ft 2545 m	2,927 ft 892 m	4.24 mi 6.83 km	48.6353°N 121.1388°W	1931
35	Mount Saint Helens (Note: The elevation of Mount Saint Helens includes an adjustment of +1.321 m (4.33 ft) from NGVD 29 to NAVD 88.)	Mount Saint Helens Area	8,337 ft 2541 m	4,593 ft 1400 m	32 mi 51.5 km	46.1914°N 122.1956°W	1853
36	Windy Peak (Note: The elevation of Windy Peak includes an adjustment of +1.436 m (4.71 ft) from NGVD 29 to NAVD 88.)	Okanogan Range	8,333 ft 2540 m	1,787 ft 545 m	9.23 mi 14.86 km	48.9283°N 119.9706°W	1904
37	Mount Formidable	Central North Cascades	8,327 ft 2538 m	1,905 ft 581 m	5.25 mi 8.45 km	48.4163°N 121.0671°W	1938
38	Flora Mountain	Central North Cascades	8,323 ft 2537 m	1,820 ft 555 m	3.95 mi 6.36 km	48.2431°N 120.6957°W	1940
39	Luna Peak	Skagit Range	8,314 ft 2534 m	3,105 ft 946 m	8.07 mi 12.98 km	48.8308°N 121.2721°W	1938
40	Castle Peak (Note: The elevation of Castle Peak includes an adjustment of +1.414 m (4.64 ft) from NGVD 29 to NAVD 88.)	Hozameen Range	8,311 ft 2533 m	3,246 ft 989 m	14.82 mi 23.9 km	48.9821°N 120.8622°W	1904
41	Sentinel Peak	Central North Cascades	8,264 ft 2519 m	1,681 ft 512 m	3.03 mi 4.87 km	48.3562°N 121.0409°W	1935
42	Tiffany Mountain (Note: The summit of Tiffany Mountain is the highest point of the Tiffany Range.)	Okanogan Range	8,250 ft 2514.71 m	2,782 ft 848 m	17.97 mi 28.9 km	48.6696°N 119.9325°W	< 1900
43	Gilbert Peak (Note: The elevation of Gilbert Peak includes an adjustment of +1.335 m (4.38 ft) from NGVD 29 to NAVD 88.)	South Washington Cascades	8,188 ft 2496 m	3,684 ft 1123 m	20.1 mi 32.4 km	46.4886°N 121.4084°W	1899
44	Mount Terror	Skagit Range	8,153 ft 2485 m	1,934 ft 589 m	2.5 mi 4.03 km	48.7748°N 121.2994°W	1932
45	The Needles	Okanogan Range	8,140 ft 2481 m	1,759 ft 536 m	2.26 mi 3.64 km	48.5998°N 120.6574°W	1944
46	Crater Mountain	Hozameen Range	8,130 ft 2478 m	1,948 ft 594 m	2.67 mi 4.29 km	48.7393°N 120.9202°W	< 1929
47	McGregor Mountain	Methow Mountains	8,127 ft 2477 m	2,142 ft 653 m	6.9 mi 11.11 km	48.4082°N 120.7982°W	
48	Big Chiwaukum (Note: The summit of Big Chiwaukum is the highest point of the Chiwaukum Mountains.) (Note: The elevation of Big Chiwaukum includes an adjustment of +1.38 m (4.53 ft) from NGVD 29 to NAVD 88.)	Wenatchee Mountains	8,086 ft 2464 m	3,701 ft 1128 m	10.43 mi 16.78 km	47.7024°N 120.9347°W	
49	Hozomeen North Peak	Hozameen Range	8,071 ft 2460 m	3,947 ft 1203 m	6.82 mi 10.97 km	48.9822°N 121.0120°W	1904
50	Cutthroat Peak	Okanogan Range	8,054 ft 2455 m	1,750 ft 533 m	3.84 mi 6.18 km	48.5264°N 120.7035°W	1937
51	American Border Peak (Tum mea hal)	Skagit Range	7,999 ft 2438 m	2,934 ft 894 m	11.23 mi 18.07 km	48.9954°N 121.6651°W	1930
52	Mount Olympus (Note: The summit of Mount Olympus is the highest point of the Olympic Mountains.)	Olympic Mountains	7,980 ft 2432.3 m	7,838 ft 2389 m	108 mi 173.7 km	47.8013°N 123.7108°W	
53	Three Fools Peak	Hozameen Range	7,923 ft 2415 m	2,489 ft 759 m	7.05 mi 11.35 km	48.9006°N 120.7633°W	1925
53	Gabriel Peak	Central North Cascades	7,923 ft 2415 m	1,960 ft 597 m	2.63 mi 4.23 km	48.6278°N 120.9353°W	
55	Mount Daniel NW summit	Alpine Lakes Area	7,904 ft 2409 m	3,520 ft 1073 m	13.45 mi 21.6 km	47.5626°N 121.1720°W	< 1925 (Note: No climbing records prior to the 1925 Mountaineer outing have been located, but it seems probable that surveyors had already ascended Daniel)
56	Chopaka Mountain	Okanogan Range	7,884 ft 2403 m	1,827 ft 557 m	6.39 mi 10.29 km	48.9574°N 119.7848°W	1901
57	Plummer Mountain	Central North Cascades	7,874 ft 2400 m	1,970 ft 600 m	2.48 mi 3.99 km	48.2071°N 120.9721°W	
58	Sloan Peak	Mountain Loop Area	7,835 ft 2388 m	3,895 ft 1187 m	11.12 mi 17.89 km	48.0415°N 121.3402°W	1921
59	Mount Deception (Note: The elevation of Mount Deception includes an adjustment of +1.341 m (4.4 ft) from NGVD 29 to NAVD 88.)	Central Olympic Mountains	7,792 ft 2375 m	4,128 ft 1258 m	21.7 mi 35 km	47.8134°N 123.2334°W	
60	Mount Aix	South Cascade Crest	7,770 ft 2368.3 m	3,296 ft 1005 m	20.6 mi 33.2 km	46.7950°N 121.2559°W	
61	Mount Constance	Eastern Olympic Mountains	7,759 ft 2365 m	1,976 ft 602 m	5.67 mi 9.13 km	47.7728°N 123.1273°W	1922
62	Elija Ridge	Central North Cascades	7,743 ft 2360 m	2,039 ft 621 m	1.79 mi 2.88 km	48.6504°N 120.9601°W	
63	Chimney Rock	Alpine Lakes Area	7,730 ft 2356 m	2,747 ft 837 m	6.42 mi 10.33 km	47.5071°N 121.2901°W	1930
64	Mount Blum	Skagit Range	7,685 ft 2342.3 m	3,300 ft 1006 m	6.05 mi 9.73 km	48.7541°N 121.4825°W	1920s
65	Mount Prophet (Note: The elevation of Mount Prophet includes an adjustment of +1.328 m (4.36 ft) from NGVD 29 to NAVD 88.)	Skagit Range	7,674 ft 2339 m	4,040 ft 1231 m	5.13 mi 8.26 km	48.8486°N 121.1628°W	1975
66	Daemon Peak	Hozameen Range	7,516 ft 2291 m	2,214 ft 675 m	3.11 mi 5 km	48.8344°N 120.8397°W	
67	The Cradle	Wenatchee Mountains	7,470 ft 2277 m	2,127 ft 648 m	5.71 mi 9.19 km	47.5608°N 121.0330°W	1944
68	Mount Misch	Central North Cascades	7,438 ft 2267 m	2,455 ft 748 m	5.3 mi 8.53 km	48.3435°N 121.2000°W	1955
68	Tomyhoi Peak (Put-lush-go-hap)	Skagit Range	7,438 ft 2267 m	2,055 ft 626 m	2.4 mi 3.87 km	48.9749°N 121.7098°W	1927 ?
70	Mount David	Glacier Peak Area	7,425 ft 2263 m	2,440 ft 744 m	5.57 mi 8.97 km	47.9631°N 120.9895°W	
71	Ruby Mountain	Central North Cascades	7,408 ft 2258 m	3,908 ft 1191 m	4.27 mi 6.87 km	48.6944°N 121.0429°W	1916
72	Indian Head Peak	Glacier Peak Area	7,405 ft 2257 m	2,040 ft 622 m	3.29 mi 5.29 km	48.0079°N 121.0978°W	1870
73	West Peak	Central Olympic Mountains	7,369 ft 2246 m	1,985 ft 605 m	7.73 mi 12.44 km	47.7232°N 123.3492°W	1930
74	Gypsy Peak	Priest Lake Selkirks	7,323 ft 2232 m	1,760 ft 536 m	6.43 mi 10.35 km	48.9458°N 117.1524°W	
75	Abercrombie Mountain (Note: The elevation of Abercrombie Mountain includes an adjustment of +1.345 m (4.41 ft) from NGVD 29 to NAVD 88.)	Southwest Selkirks	7,312 ft 2229 m	5,178 ft 1578 m	14.04 mi 22.6 km	48.9284°N 117.4600°W	
76	Kyes Peak	Mountain Loop Area	7,283 ft 2220 m	1,760 ft 536 m	5.21 mi 8.39 km	47.9647°N 121.3337°W	1897
77	Mount Bonaparte	Okanogan Highlands	7,262 ft 2213.6 m	3,557 ft 1084 m	26.7 mi 43 km	48.7852°N 119.1223°W	
78	Mount Triumph	Skagit Range	7,244 ft 2208 m	1,760 ft 536 m	2.32 mi 3.73 km	48.7067°N 121.3562°W	1938
79	Mount Despair	Skagit Range	7,241 ft 2207 m	1,872 ft 571 m	3.76 mi 6.05 km	48.7373°N 121.3768°W	1937
80	Mount Pugh (Da Klagwats)	Glacier Peak Area	7,205 ft 2196 m	2,821 ft 860 m	6.95 mi 11.18 km	48.1431°N 121.3744°W	1916
81	Copper Butte (Note: The summit of Copper Butte is the highest point of the Kettle River Range.)	Monashee Mountains	7,150 ft 2179.3 m	4,760 ft 1451 m	30.2 mi 48.7 km	48.7025°N 118.4656°W	
82	Mount Howard	Glacier Peak Area	7,067 ft 2154 m	2,923 ft 891 m	5.24 mi 8.44 km	47.8145°N 120.9546°W	< 1887
83	Bacon Peak	Skagit Range	7,064 ft 2153 m	2,505 ft 764 m	4.46 mi 7.17 km	48.6627°N 121.5206°W	1905
84	Davis Peak	Skagit Range	7,054 ft 2150 m	1,791 ft 546 m	2.96 mi 4.76 km	48.7295°N 121.2030°W	1904
85	Crystal Mountain	South Cascade Crest	7,001 ft 2134 m	2,304 ft 702 m	5.06 mi 8.14 km	46.9159°N 121.5040°W	
86	White Chuck Mountain (Hi Khaed)	Mountain Loop Area	6,989 ft 2130 m	3,809 ft 1161 m	4.93 mi 7.93 km	48.2085°N 121.4169°W	1897
87	Unicorn Peak	Tatoosh Range	6,975 ft 2126 m	2,104 ft 641 m	4.34 mi 6.98 km	46.7451°N 121.7009°W	
88	South Twin	Skagit Range	6,936 ft 2114.15 m	3,560 ft 1085 m	6.9 mi 11.11 km	48.7049°N 121.9874°W	1891
89	Mission Peak	Wenatchee Mountains	6,880 ft 2097 m	2,809 ft 856 m	17.98 mi 28.9 km	47.2848°N 120.4412°W	
90	Calispell Peak	Southwest Selkirks	6,861 ft 2091.3 m	3,645 ft 1111 m	33.6 mi 54.1 km	48.4369°N 117.5025°W	
91	Three Fingers (Queest Alb) (Note: The summit elevation of Three Fingers (Queest Alb) includes a vertical offset of +0.356 m (1.2 ft) from the station benchmark.)	Mountain Loop Area	6,859 ft 2090.6 m	4,510 ft 1375 m	12.79 mi 20.6 km	48.1699°N 121.6878°W	1931
92	The Brothers S summit	Eastern Olympic Mountains	6,844 ft 2086 m	2,702 ft 824 m	7.12 mi 11.46 km	47.6538°N 123.1406°W	1912
92	Whitehorse Mountain (So-bahli-ahli)	Mountain Loop Area	6,844 ft 2086 m	2,200 ft 671 m	2.86 mi 4.61 km	48.2110°N 121.6777°W	1909
94	Molybdenite Mountain	Southwest Selkirks	6,788 ft 2069 m	2,364 ft 721 m	12.4 mi 19.95 km	48.7102°N 117.2863°W	
95	Moses Mountain	Okanogan Highlands	6,778 ft 2066 m	4,154 ft 1266 m	28.6 mi 46.1 km	48.3719°N 119.0613°W	
96	Del Campo Peak	Mountain Loop Area	6,614 ft 2016 m	2,230 ft 680 m	3.84 mi 6.18 km	47.9907°N 121.4706°W	<= 1912
96	Mount Stone	Eastern Olympic Mountains	6,614 ft 2016 m	2,152 ft 656 m	6.67 mi 10.74 km	47.6063°N 123.2666°W	1932
98	Oregon Butte (Note: The summit of Oregon Butte is the highest point of the northern Blue Mountains.) (Note: The summit elevation of Oregon Butte includes a vertical offset of +0.203 m (0.7 ft) from the station benchmark.)	Blue Mountains	6,391 ft 1947.9 m	2,417 ft 737 m	46.5 mi 74.8 km	46.1104°N 117.6797°W	
99	Dirtyface Peak (Note: The elevation of Dirtyface Peak includes an adjustment of +1.248 m (4.09 ft) from NGVD 29 to NAVD 88.)	Glacier Peak Area	6,264 ft 1909 m	3,360 ft 1024 m	4.78 mi 7.7 km	47.8713°N 120.8253°W	1898
100	Mount Washington	Eastern Olympic Mountains	6,260 ft 1908 m	2,635 ft 803 m	4.69 mi 7.54 km	47.5313°N 123.2460°W	

== Most prominent summits ==
Of the most prominent summits of the State of Washington, Mount Rainier exceeds 4000 meters (13,123 feet) of topographic prominence, five peaks exceed 2000 meters (6562 feet), seven peaks are ultra-prominent summits with more than 1500 meters (4921 feet) of topographic prominence, and 40 peaks exceed 1000 meters (3281 feet) of topographic prominence.

The 50 most topographically prominent summits of Washington
Rank	Mountain peak	Mountain range	Elevation	Prominence	Isolation	Location	First ascent
1	Mount Rainier (Tahoma)	Mount Rainier Area	14,417 ft 4394.3 m	13,246 ft 4037 m	731 mi 1,177 km	46.8529°N 121.7604°W	1870 (Note: Or perhaps as early as 1858 by two unidentified miners)
2	Mount Baker (Kulshan)	Skagit Range	10,786 ft 3287 m	8,845 ft 2696 m	131.5 mi 212 km	48.7768°N 121.8145°W	1868
3	Mount Adams (Pahto)	Mount Adams Area	12,281 ft 3743.4 m	8,136 ft 2480 m	45.8 mi 73.6 km	46.2024°N 121.4909°W	1894
4	Mount Olympus	Olympic Mountains	7,980 ft 2432.3 m	7,838 ft 2389 m	108 mi 173.7 km	47.8013°N 123.7108°W	
5	Glacier Peak (DaKobed)	Glacier Peak Area	10,545 ft 3214 m	7,518 ft 2291 m	56 mi 90.2 km	48.1125°N 121.1138°W	1897
6	Mount Stuart	Wenatchee Mountains	9,420 ft 2871 m	5,354 ft 1632 m	44.5 mi 71.6 km	47.4751°N 120.9024°W	1873 or 1883
7	Abercrombie Mountain	Southwest Selkirks	7,312 ft 2229 m	5,178 ft 1578 m	14.04 mi 22.6 km	48.9284°N 117.4600°W	
8	Round Mountain (Note: The elevation of Round Mountain includes an adjustment of +1.188 m (3.9 ft) from NGVD 29 to NAVD 88.)	Mountain Loop Area	5,344 ft 1629 m	4,810 ft 1466 m	8.67 mi 13.95 km	48.3265°N 121.7507°W	
9	Mount Spickard	Skagit Range	8,980 ft 2737.2 m	4,799 ft 1463 m	18.78 mi 30.2 km	48.9697°N 121.2405°W	1904
10	Copper Butte	Monashee Mountains	7,150 ft 2179.3 m	4,760 ft 1451 m	30.2 mi 48.7 km	48.7025°N 118.4656°W	
11	Mount Saint Helens	Mount Saint Helens Area	8,337 ft 2541 m	4,593 ft 1400 m	32 mi 51.5 km	46.1914°N 122.1956°W	1853
12	Three Fingers (Queest Alb)	Mountain Loop Area	6,859 ft 2090.6 m	4,510 ft 1375 m	12.79 mi 20.6 km	48.1699°N 121.6878°W	1931
13	Mount Shuksan	Skagit Range	9,135 ft 2784 m	4,431 ft 1351 m	10.36 mi 16.68 km	48.8315°N 121.6032°W	1897 or 1906
14	Remmel Mountain	Okanogan Range	8,691 ft 2649.16 m	4,385 ft 1337 m	16.83 mi 27.1 km	48.9234°N 120.1968°W	1904
15	Jack Mountain	Hozameen Range	9,075 ft 2766 m	4,211 ft 1284 m	16.32 mi 26.3 km	48.7728°N 120.9562°W	1904
16	Moses Mountain	Okanogan Highlands	6,778 ft 2066 m	4,154 ft 1266 m	28.6 mi 46.1 km	48.3719°N 119.0613°W	
17	Mount Deception	Central Olympic Mountains	7,792 ft 2375 m	4,128 ft 1258 m	21.7 mi 35 km	47.8134°N 123.2334°W	
18	Mount Prophet	Skagit Range	7,674 ft 2339 m	4,040 ft 1231 m	5.13 mi 8.26 km	48.8486°N 121.1628°W	1975
19	North Gardner Mountain	Central North Cascades	8,961 ft 2731 m	4,016 ft 1224 m	14.42 mi 23.2 km	48.5152°N 120.5017°W	1925
20	Hozomeen North Peak	Hozameen Range	8,071 ft 2460 m	3,947 ft 1203 m	6.82 mi 10.97 km	48.9822°N 121.0120°W	1904
21	Ruby Mountain	Central North Cascades	7,408 ft 2258 m	3,908 ft 1191 m	4.27 mi 6.87 km	48.6944°N 121.0429°W	1916
22	Sloan Peak	Mountain Loop Area	7,835 ft 2388 m	3,895 ft 1187 m	11.12 mi 17.89 km	48.0415°N 121.3402°W	1921
23	Huckleberry Mountain (Note: The summit of Huckleberry Mountain is the highest point of the Huckleberry Mountains.)	Southwest Selkirks	5,826 ft 1775.8 m	3,875 ft 1181 m	25.4 mi 40.8 km	48.2122°N 117.9766°W	
24	Goode Mountain	Central North Cascades	9,224 ft 2812 m	3,828 ft 1167 m	17.02 mi 27.4 km	48.4831°N 120.9115°W	1936
25	White Chuck Mountain (Hi Khaed)	Mountain Loop Area	6,989 ft 2130 m	3,809 ft 1161 m	4.93 mi 7.93 km	48.2085°N 121.4169°W	1897
26	Bonanza Peak	Central North Cascades	9,516 ft 2900 m	3,731 ft 1137 m	14.4 mi 23.2 km	48.2382°N 120.8664°W	1937
27	Big Chiwaukum	Wenatchee Mountains	8,086 ft 2464 m	3,701 ft 1128 m	10.43 mi 16.78 km	47.7024°N 120.9347°W	
28	Gilbert Peak	South Washington Cascades	8,188 ft 2496 m	3,684 ft 1123 m	20.1 mi 32.4 km	46.4886°N 121.4084°W	1899
29	Gunn Peak (Note: The elevation of Gunn Peak includes an adjustment of +1.243 m (4.08 ft) from NGVD 29 to NAVD 88.)	Glacier Peak Area	6,244 ft 1903 m	3,651 ft 1113 m	10.82 mi 17.42 km	47.8161°N 121.4480°W	1915
30	Calispell Peak	Southwest Selkirks	6,861 ft 2091.3 m	3,645 ft 1111 m	33.6 mi 54.1 km	48.4369°N 117.5025°W	
31	South Twin	Skagit Range	6,936 ft 2114.15 m	3,560 ft 1085 m	6.9 mi 11.11 km	48.7049°N 121.9874°W	1891
32	Mount Bonaparte	Okanogan Highlands	7,262 ft 2213.6 m	3,557 ft 1084 m	26.7 mi 43 km	48.7852°N 119.1223°W	
33	Mount Daniel NW summit	Alpine Lakes Area	7,904 ft 2409 m	3,520 ft 1073 m	13.45 mi 21.6 km	47.5626°N 121.1720°W	< 1925 (Note: No climbing records prior to the 1925 Mountaineer outing have been located, but it seems probable that surveyors had already ascended Daniel)
34	Mount Spokane	Southwest Selkirks	5,887 ft 1794.4 m	3,508 ft 1069 m	33.2 mi 53.5 km	47.9236°N 117.1122°W	
35	Black Peak	Central North Cascades	8,975 ft 2735 m	3,470 ft 1058 m	5.19 mi 8.36 km	48.5236°N 120.8162°W	1926
36	Lyman Hill (Note: The elevation of Lyman Hill includes an adjustment of +1.221 m (4.01 ft) from NGVD 29 to NAVD 88.)	Skagit Range	4,304 ft 1312 m	3,440 ft 1049 m	7.2 mi 11.59 km	48.5947°N 122.1591°W	
37	Dirtyface Peak	Glacier Peak Area	6,264 ft 1909 m	3,360 ft 1024 m	4.78 mi 7.7 km	47.8713°N 120.8253°W	1898
38	Aeneas Mountain	Okanogan Range	5,173 ft 1576.87 m	3,347 ft 1020 m	5.13 mi 8.25 km	48.7431°N 119.6223°W	
39	Mount Blum	Skagit Range	7,685 ft 2342.3 m	3,300 ft 1006 m	6.05 mi 9.73 km	48.7541°N 121.4825°W	1920s
40	Mount Aix	South Cascade Crest	7,770 ft 2368.3 m	3,296 ft 1005 m	20.6 mi 33.2 km	46.7950°N 121.2559°W	
41	Mount Lago	Okanogan Range	8,750 ft 2667 m	3,268 ft 996 m	19.52 mi 31.4 km	48.8293°N 120.5374°W	1925
42	Desolation Peak (Note: The elevation of Desolation Peak includes an adjustment of +1.244 m (4.08 ft) from NGVD 29 to NAVD 88.)	Hozameen Range	6,106 ft 1861 m	3,249 ft 990 m	2.89 mi 4.65 km	48.9114°N 121.0168°W	1926
43	Castle Peak	Hozameen Range	8,311 ft 2533 m	3,246 ft 989 m	14.82 mi 23.9 km	48.9821°N 120.8622°W	1904
44	High Rock	Mount Rainier Area	5,689 ft 1734 m	3,145 ft 959 m	6.03 mi 9.7 km	46.6844°N 121.9015°W	
45	Luna Peak	Skagit Range	8,314 ft 2534 m	3,105 ft 946 m	8.07 mi 12.98 km	48.8308°N 121.2721°W	1938
46	Big Craggy Peak	Okanogan Range	8,474 ft 2583 m	3,090 ft 942 m	10.02 mi 16.13 km	48.7630°N 120.3280°W	1960 ?
47	Dome Peak	Central North Cascades	8,945 ft 2726 m	3,080 ft 939 m	8.46 mi 13.61 km	48.3034°N 121.0295°W	1936
48	Buckner Mountain	Central North Cascades	9,119 ft 2779 m	3,054 ft 931 m	4.13 mi 6.65 km	48.4943°N 120.9999°W	1901
49	Mount Index	Alpine Lakes Area	5,994 ft 1827 m	3,011 ft 918 m	6.42 mi 10.33 km	47.7744°N 121.5804°W	< 1911 (Note: The first recorded ascendants (H. B. Hinman, Ernest Martin, Lee Pickett, George E. Wright) found a flagpole already on the summit. Since the easiest route is non-technical, a much earlier ascent by Native Americans is likely.)
50	American Border Peak (Tum mea hal)	Skagit Range	7,999 ft 2438 m	2,934 ft 894 m	11.23 mi 18.07 km	48.9954°N 121.6651°W	1930

== Most isolated major summits ==
Of the major summits of the State of Washington, Mount Rainier exceeds 1000 kilometers (621.4 miles) of topographic isolation, three peaks exceed 100 kilometers (62.14 miles), and 16 exceed 40 kilometers (24.85 miles) of topographic isolation.

The 25 most topographically isolated summits of Washington with at least 500 meters of topographic prominence
Rank	Mountain peak	Mountain range	Elevation	Prominence	Isolation	Location	First ascent
1	Mount Rainier (Tahoma)	Mount Rainier Area	14,417 ft 4394 m	13,246 ft 4037 m	731 mi 1,177 km	46.8529°N 121.7604°W	1870 (Note: Or perhaps as early as 1858 by two unidentified miners)
2	Mount Baker (Kulshan)	Skagit Range	10,786 ft 3287 m	8,845 ft 2696 m	131.5 mi 212 km	48.7768°N 121.8145°W	1868
3	Mount Olympus	Olympic Mountains	7,980 ft 2432.3 m	7,838 ft 2389 m	108 mi 173.7 km	47.8013°N 123.7108°W	
4	Glacier Peak (DaKobed)	Glacier Peak Area	10,545 ft 3214 m	7,518 ft 2291 m	56 mi 90.2 km	48.1125°N 121.1138°W	1897
5	Oregon Butte	Blue Mountains	6,391 ft 1947.9 m	2,417 ft 737 m	46.5 mi 74.8 km	46.1104°N 117.6797°W	
6	Mount Adams (Pahto)	Mount Adams Area	12,281 ft 3743.4 m	8,136 ft 2480 m	45.8 mi 73.6 km	46.2024°N 121.4909°W	1894
7	Mount Stuart	Wenatchee Mountains	9,420 ft 2871 m	5,354 ft 1632 m	44.5 mi 71.6 km	47.4751°N 120.9024°W	1873 or 1883
8	Boistfort Peak (Note: The summit of Boistfort Peak is the highest point of the Willapa Hills.)	Willapa Hills	3,113 ft 948.9 m	2,710 ft 826 m	34.5 mi 55.5 km	46.4881°N 123.2153°W	
9	Calispell Peak	Southwest Selkirks	6,861 ft 2091.3 m	3,645 ft 1111 m	33.6 mi 54.1 km	48.4369°N 117.5025°W	
10	Mount Spokane	Southwest Selkirks	5,887 ft 1794.4 m	3,508 ft 1069 m	33.2 mi 53.5 km	47.9236°N 117.1122°W	
11	Mount Saint Helens	Mount Saint Helens Area	8,337 ft 2541 m	4,593 ft 1400 m	32 mi 51.5 km	46.1914°N 122.1956°W	1853
12	Indian Rock	North Columbia Plateau	5,850 ft 1783 m	2,575 ft 785 m	30.4 mi 49 km	45.9939°N 120.8232°W	
13	Copper Butte	Monashee Mountains	7,150 ft 2179.3 m	4,760 ft 1451 m	30.2 mi 48.7 km	48.7025°N 118.4656°W	
14	Moses Mountain	Okanogan Highlands	6,778 ft 2066 m	4,154 ft 1266 m	28.6 mi 46.1 km	48.3719°N 119.0613°W	
15	Mount Bonaparte	Okanogan Highlands	7,262 ft 2213.6 m	3,557 ft 1084 m	26.7 mi 43 km	48.7852°N 119.1223°W	
16	Huckleberry Mountain	Southwest Selkirks	5,826 ft 1775.8 m	3,875 ft 1181 m	25.4 mi 40.8 km	48.2122°N 117.9766°W	
17	Mount Deception	Central Olympic Mountains	7,792 ft 2375 m	4,128 ft 1258 m	21.7 mi 35 km	47.8134°N 123.2334°W	
18	Mount Constitution (Note: The summit of Mount Constitution is the highest point of Orcas Island and the San Juan Islands.)	Orcas Island	2,399 ft 731.15 m	2,399 ft 731 m	21.4 mi 34.4 km	48.6776°N 122.8312°W	
19	Mount Aix	South Cascade Crest	7,770 ft 2368.3 m	3,296 ft 1005 m	20.6 mi 33.2 km	46.7950°N 121.2559°W	
20	Gilbert Peak	South Washington Cascades	8,188 ft 2496 m	3,684 ft 1123 m	20.1 mi 32.4 km	46.4886°N 121.4084°W	1899
21	Mount Lago	Okanogan Range	8,750 ft 2667 m	3,268 ft 996 m	19.52 mi 31.4 km	48.8293°N 120.5374°W	1925
22	Mount Spickard	Skagit Range	8,980 ft 2737.2 m	4,799 ft 1463 m	18.78 mi 30.2 km	48.9697°N 121.2405°W	1904
23	Mission Peak	Wenatchee Mountains	6,880 ft 2097 m	2,809 ft 856 m	17.98 mi 28.9 km	47.2848°N 120.4412°W	
24	Tiffany Mountain	Okanogan Range	8,250 ft 2514.71 m	2,782 ft 848 m	17.97 mi 28.9 km	48.6696°N 119.9325°W	< 1900
25	Goode Mountain	Central North Cascades	9,224 ft 2812 m	3,828 ft 1167 m	17.02 mi 27.4 km	48.4831°N 120.9115°W	1936

== Gallery ==
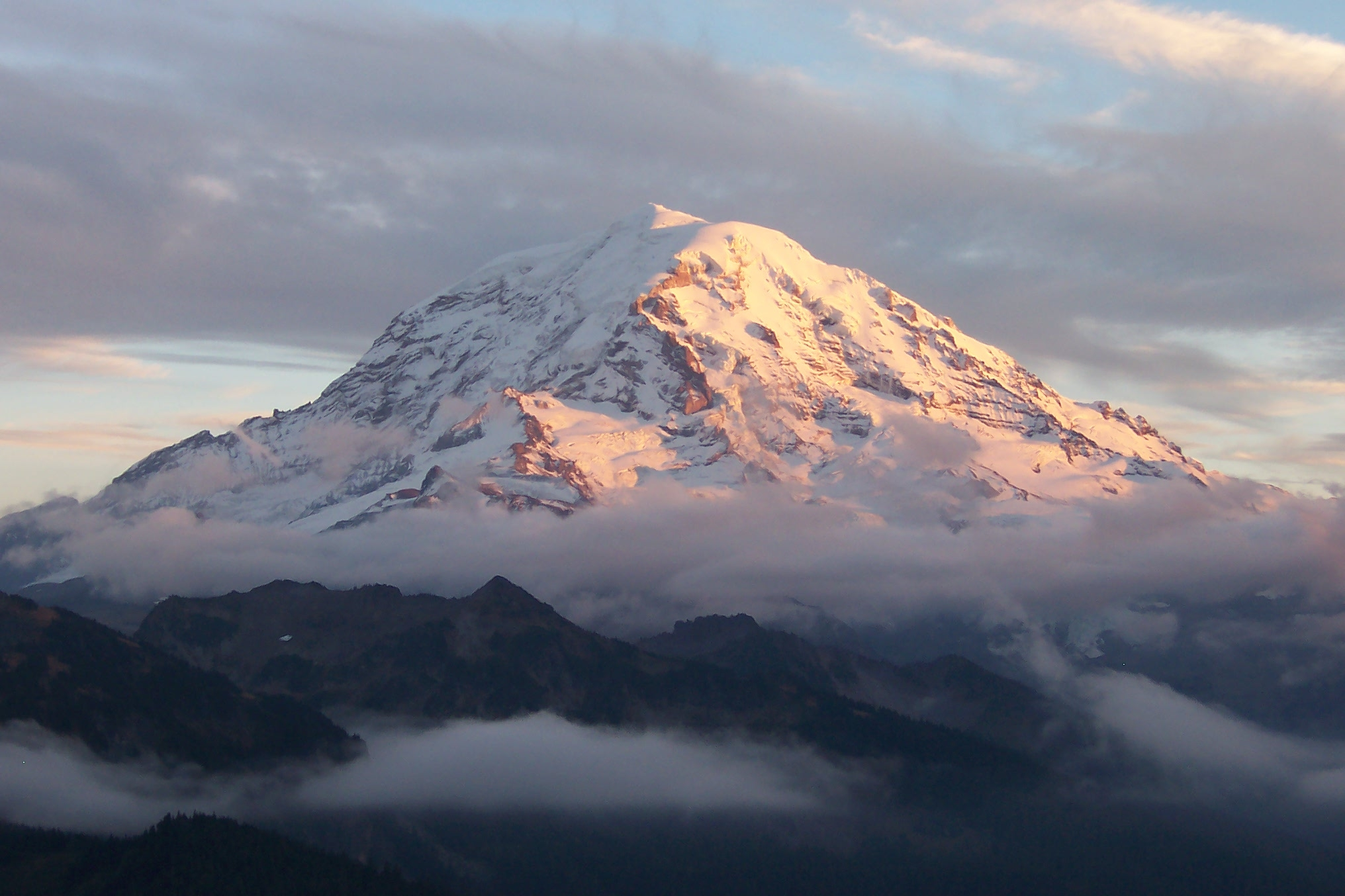
Mount Rainier is the highest summit of the Cascade Range and the U.S. State of Washington.

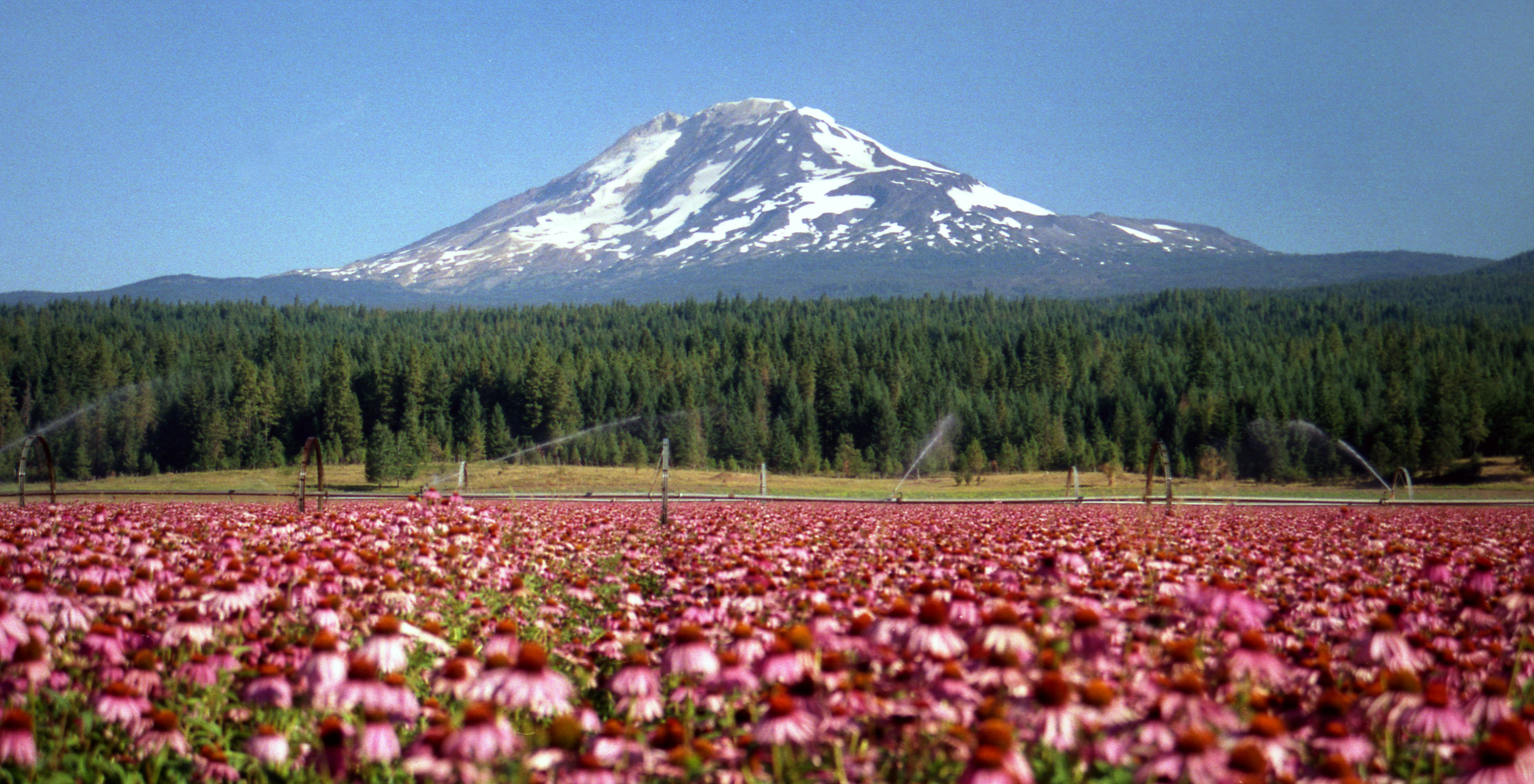
Mount Adams is the second highest summit of the U.S. State of Washington.

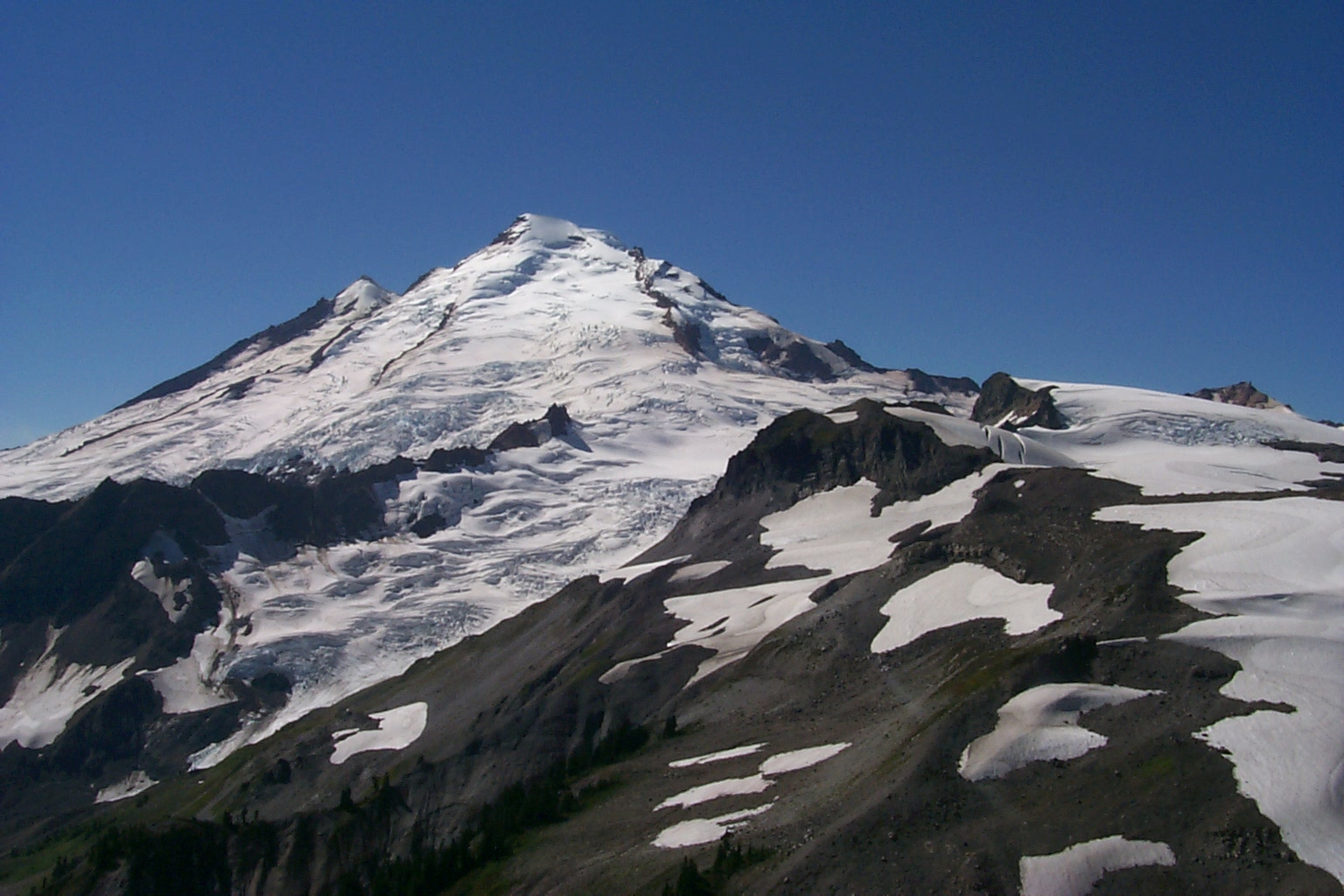
Mount Baker is the highest summit of the northern Cascade Range.

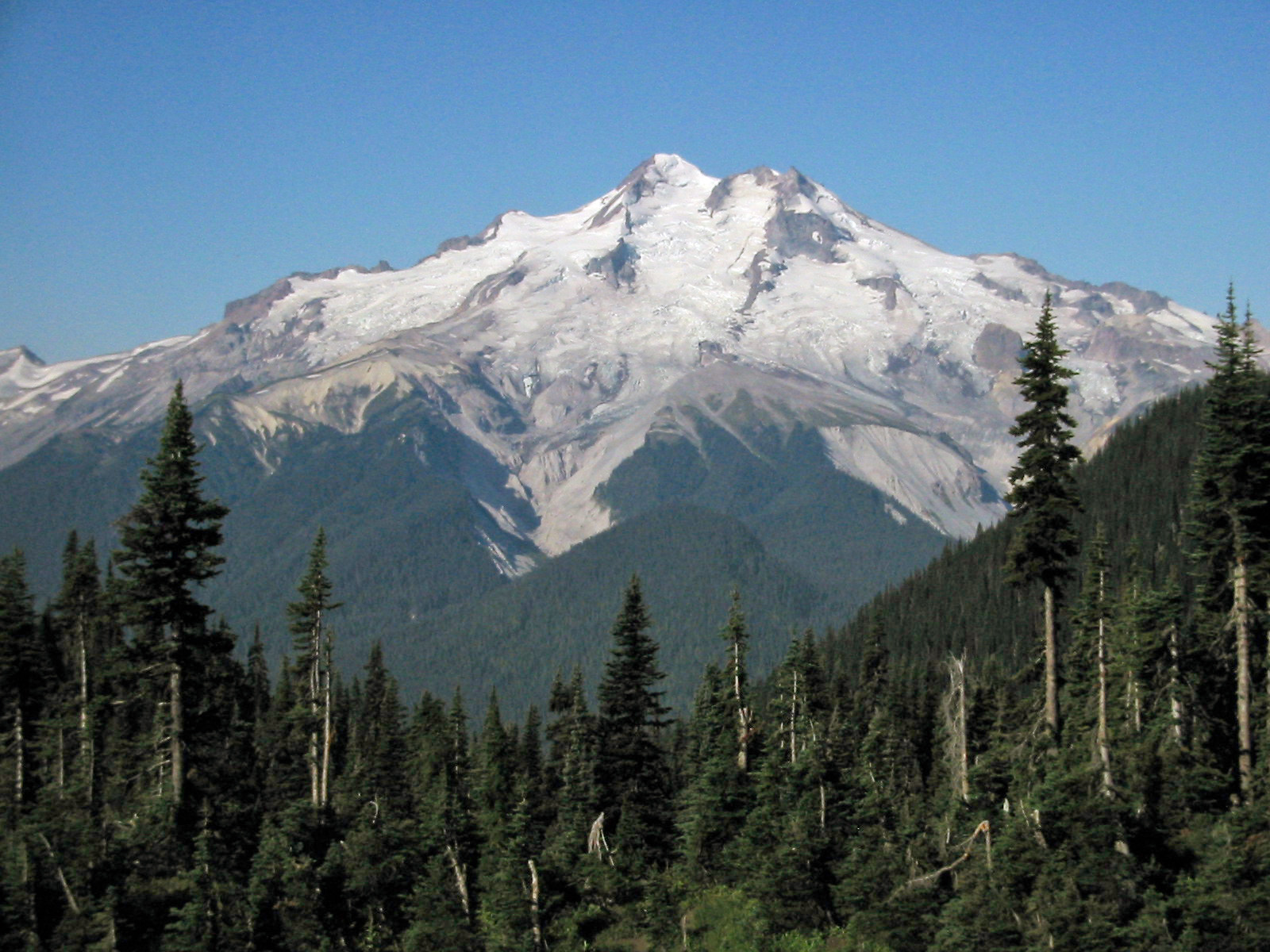
Glacier Peak is the fourth highest summit of the U.S. State of Washington.

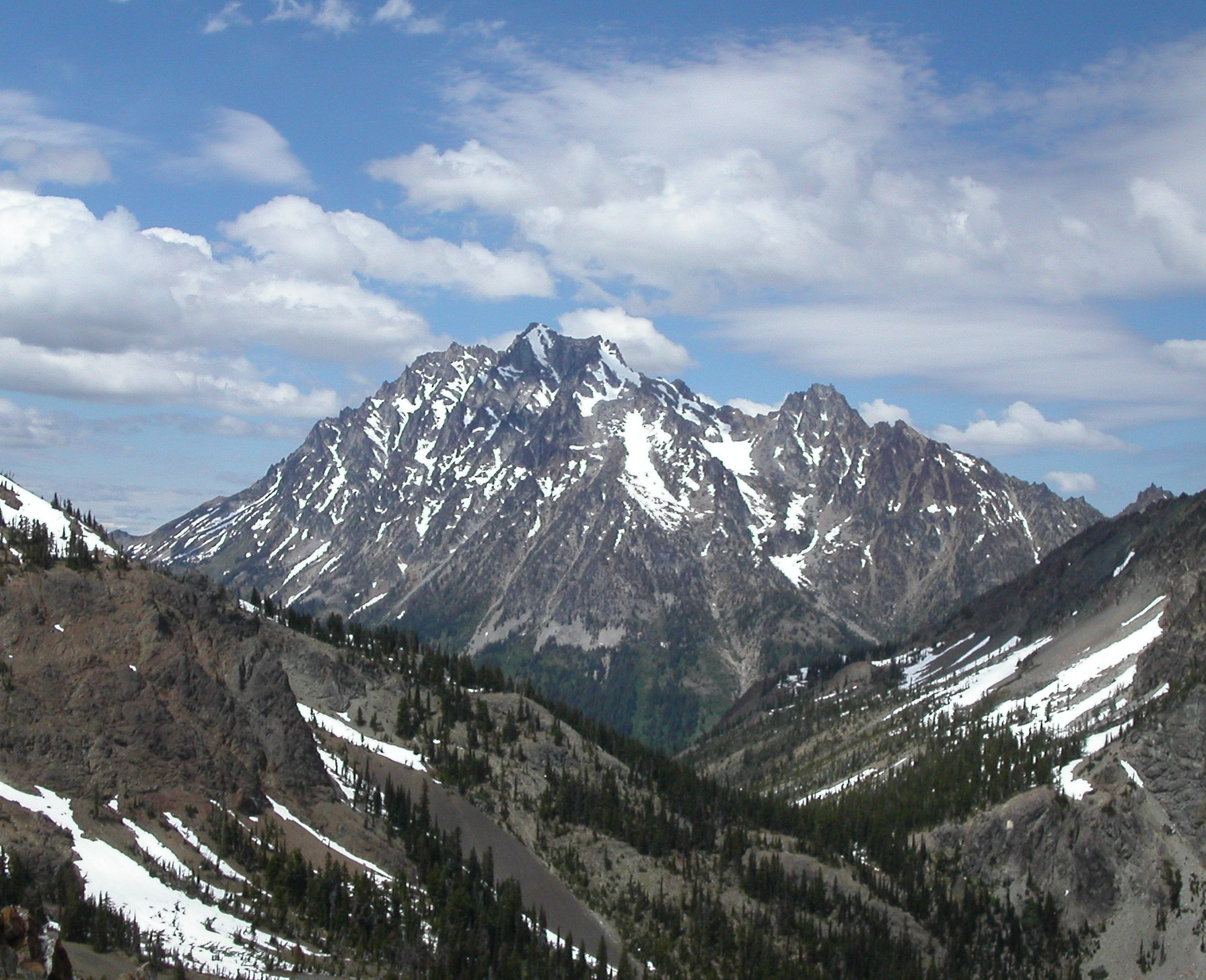
Mount Stuart is the highest summit of the Wenatchee Mountains.

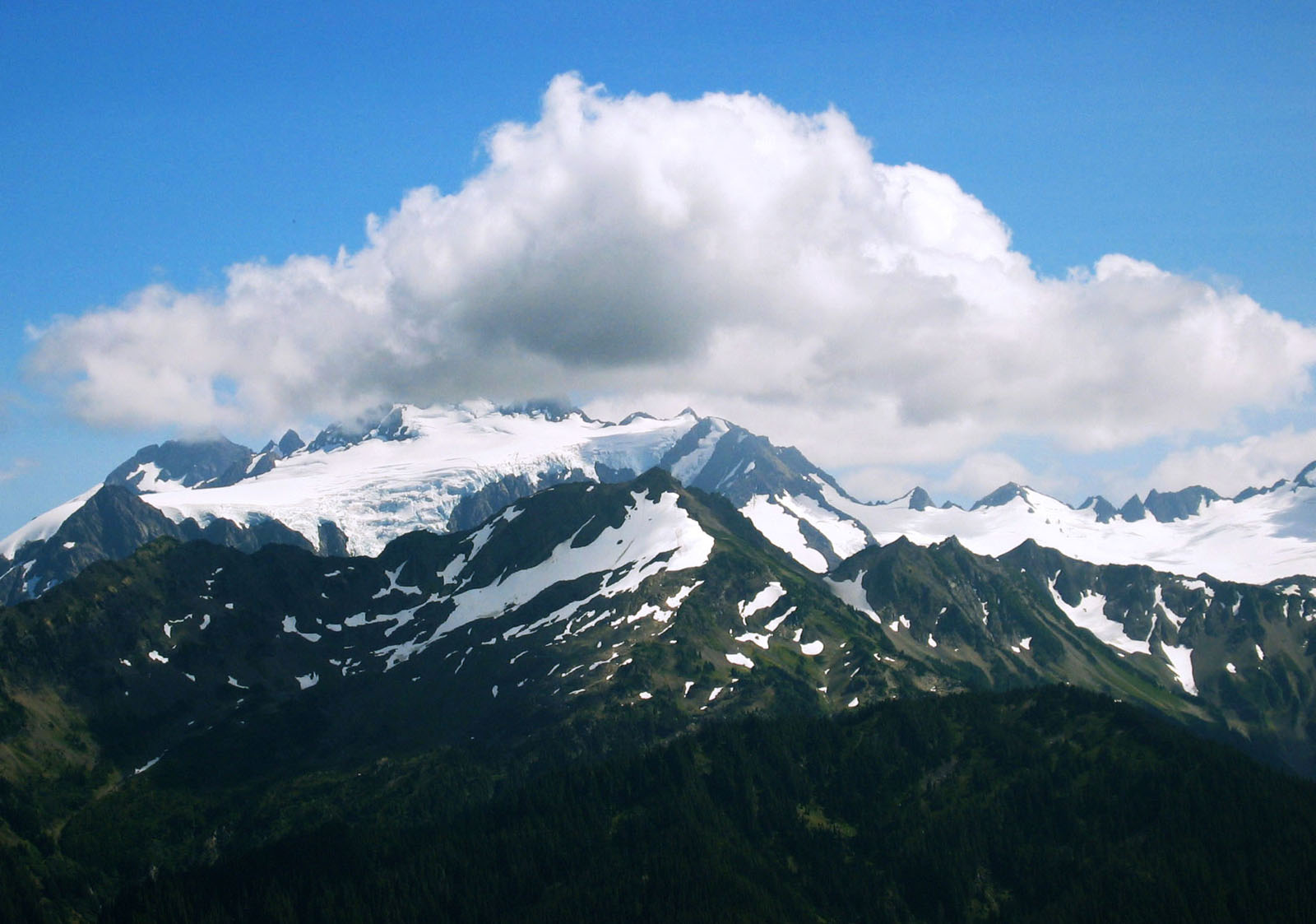
Mount Olympus is the highest summit of the Olympic Mountains.

== See also ==
- List of mountain peaks of North America
  - List of mountain peaks of the Rocky Mountains
  - List of mountain peaks of the United States
    - List of mountains of Washington
    - List of mountain ranges in Washington (state)
- Washington (state)
  - Geography of Washington (state)
    - Category:Mountains of Washington (state)
      - commons:Category:Mountains of Washington (state)
- Physical geography
  - Topography
    - Topographic elevation
    - Topographic prominence
    - Topographic isolation
- Outline of the Cascade Range
