= Lost Peak =

Mountain in Washington (state), United States

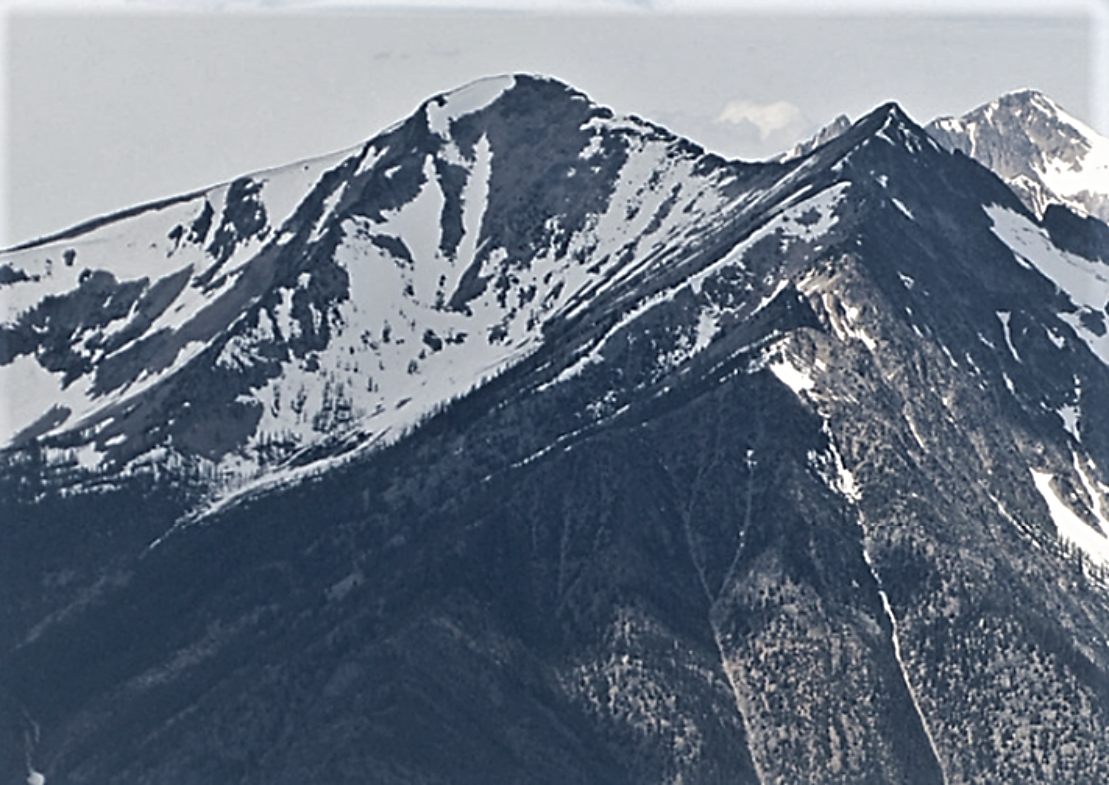
- Lost Peak, east aspect

Highest point
- Elevation: 8,464 ft (2,580 m)
- Prominence: 1,624 ft (495 m)
- Parent peak: Mount Lago (8,745 ft)
- Isolation: 3.78 mi (6.08 km)
- Listing: Highest Mountain Peaks in Washington
- Coordinates: 48°48′46″N 120°27′30″W

Geography
- Location within Washington (state) Location within the United States
- Interactive map of Lost Peak
- Location: Pasayten Wilderness; Okanogan County, Washington, U.S.
- Parent range: Okanogan Range; North Cascades; Cascade Range
- Topo map: USGS Lost Peak

Climbing
- First ascent: 1925 by Lage Wernstedt
- Easiest route: class 3 scrambling Southwest slope

Lost Peak is an 8,464-foot (2,580-metre) mountain summit located in western Okanogan County in Washington state. It is part of the Okanogan Range which is a subset of the North Cascades. This remote mountain is situated 16 mi (26 km) north of Mazama, and 7 mi (11 km) northwest of Big Craggy Peak. It is set in the Pasayten Wilderness, on land administered by the Okanogan–Wenatchee National Forest. Lost Peak ranks 62nd of Washington's highest 100 peaks, and 63rd on the "Bulger List". Precipitation runoff from Lost Peak drains into tributaries of Lost River, which in turn is part of the Methow River drainage basin.

== Climate ==
Most weather fronts originate in the Pacific Ocean, and travel northeast toward the Cascade Mountains. As fronts approach the North Cascades, they are forced upward by the peaks of the Cascade Range, causing them to drop their moisture in the form of rain or snowfall onto the Cascades (Orographic lift). As a result, the North Cascades experiences high precipitation, especially during the winter months in the form of snowfall. During winter months, weather is usually cloudy, but, due to high pressure systems over the Pacific Ocean that intensify during summer months, there is often little or no cloud cover during the summer.

== Geology ==
The North Cascades features some of the most rugged topography in the Cascade Range with craggy peaks, spires, ridges, and deep glacial valleys. Geological events occurring many years ago created the diverse topography and drastic elevation changes over the Cascade Range leading to the various climate differences.

The history of the formation of the Cascade Mountains dates back millions of years ago to the late Eocene Epoch. With the North American Plate overriding the Pacific Plate, episodes of volcanic igneous activity persisted. In addition, small fragments of the oceanic and continental lithosphere called terranes created the North Cascades about 50 million years ago.

During the Pleistocene period dating back over two million years ago, glaciation advancing and retreating repeatedly scoured the landscape leaving deposits of rock debris. The U-shaped cross section of the river valleys is a result of recent glaciation. Uplift and faulting in combination with glaciation have been the dominant processes which have created the tall peaks and deep valleys of the North Cascades area.

== See also ==
- List of mountain peaks of Washington (state)
- Geography of the North Cascades
- Geology of the Pacific Northwest
