= Tiffany Mountain =

Mountain in Washington (state), United States

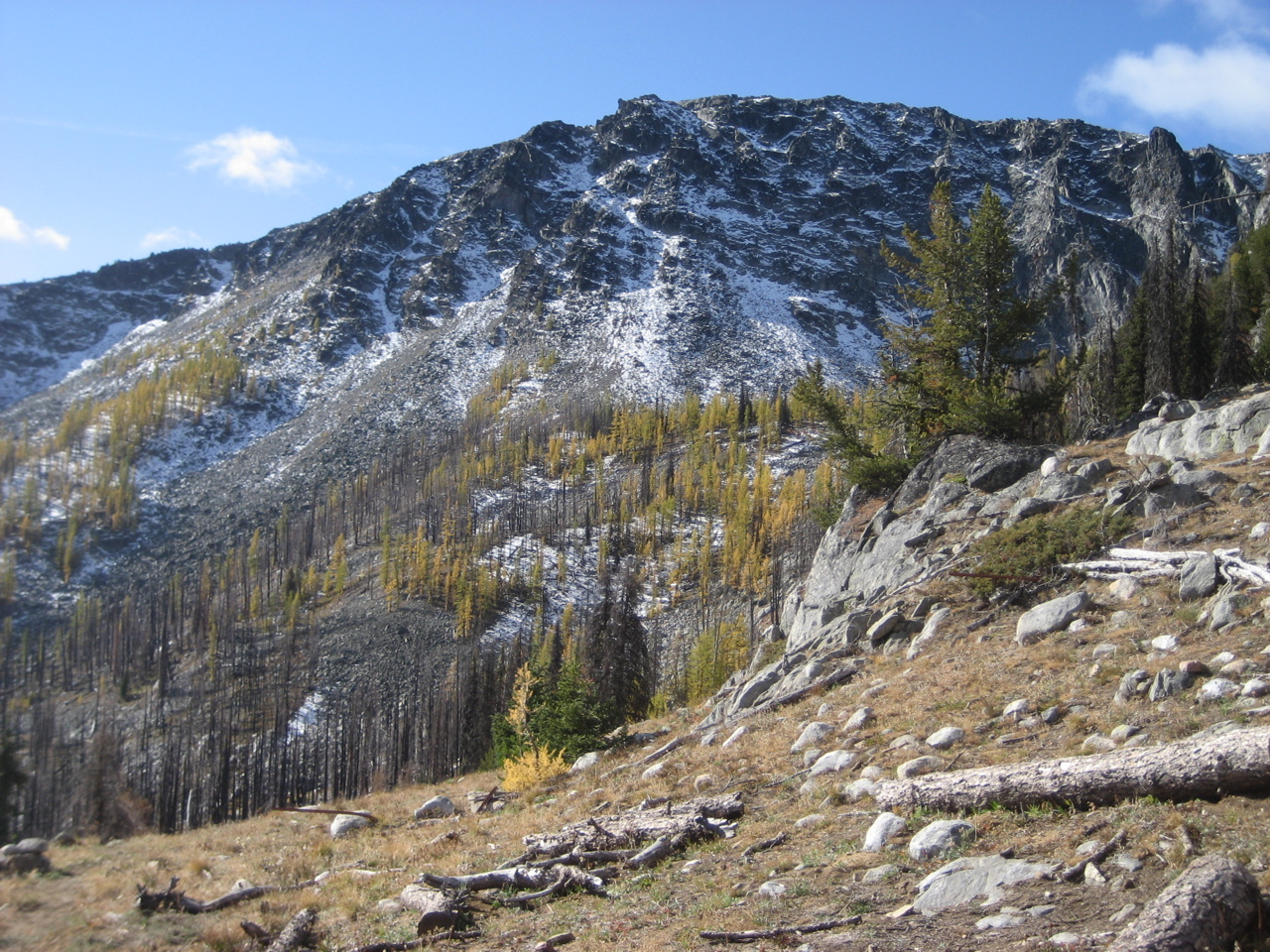
- Tiffany Mountain seen from Honeymoon Pass

Highest point
- Elevation: 8,245 ft (2,513 m)
- Prominence: 2,766 ft (843 m)
- Parent peak: Windy Peak (8,333 ft)
- Isolation: 18 mi (29 km)
- Listing: List of Highest Mountain Peaks in Washington
- Coordinates: 48°40′10″N 119°55′57″W

Geography
- Location within Washington (state) Location within the United States
- Interactive map of Tiffany Mountain
- Location: Okanogan County; Washington, U.S.
- Parent range: Okanogan Range; North Cascades; Cascade Range
- Topo map: USGS Tiffany Mountain

Climbing
- Easiest route: Hiking trail

Tiffany Mountain is an 8,245-foot (2,513-metre) mountain summit located in Okanogan County in Washington state. It is the highest point in the Tiffany Range, which is a sub-range of the Okanogan Range. The mountain is situated on the east side of the Cascade crest, on land managed by the Okanogan–Wenatchee National Forest. The nearest higher peak is Windy Peak, 18 miles (29 km) to the north. Precipitation runoff from Tiffany Mountain drains into tributaries of the Columbia River.

== Etymology ==
This mountain is named for Will Tiffany (1863–1898), who maintained a camp at the foot of the mountain. He was related to the famous Tiffany's jewelers in New York. He was also one of Roosevelt's Rough Riders, and died in Cuba during the Spanish–American War.

== Climate ==
Most weather fronts originate in the Pacific Ocean, and travel northeast toward the Cascade Mountains. As fronts approach the North Cascades, they are forced upward by the peaks of the Cascade Range, causing them to drop their moisture in the form of rain or snowfall onto the Cascades (Orographic lift). As a result, the west side of the North Cascades experiences higher precipitation than the east side, especially during the winter months in the form of snowfall. During winter months, weather is usually cloudy, but, due to high pressure systems over the Pacific Ocean that intensify during summer months, there is often little or no cloud cover during the summer.

== Geology ==
The North Cascades features some of the most rugged topography in the Cascade Range with craggy peaks, spires, ridges, and deep glacial valleys. Geological events occurring many years ago created the diverse topography and drastic elevation changes over the Cascade Range leading to various climate differences.

The history of the formation of the Cascade Mountains dates back millions of years ago to the late Eocene Epoch. With the North American Plate overriding the Pacific Plate, episodes of volcanic igneous activity persisted. In addition, small fragments of the oceanic and continental lithosphere called terranes created the North Cascades about 50 million years ago.

During the Pleistocene period dating back over two million years ago, glaciation advancing and retreating repeatedly scoured the landscape leaving deposits of rock debris. The U-shaped cross section of the river valleys is a result of recent glaciation. Uplift and faulting in combination with glaciation have been the dominant processes which have created the tall peaks and deep valleys of the North Cascades area.

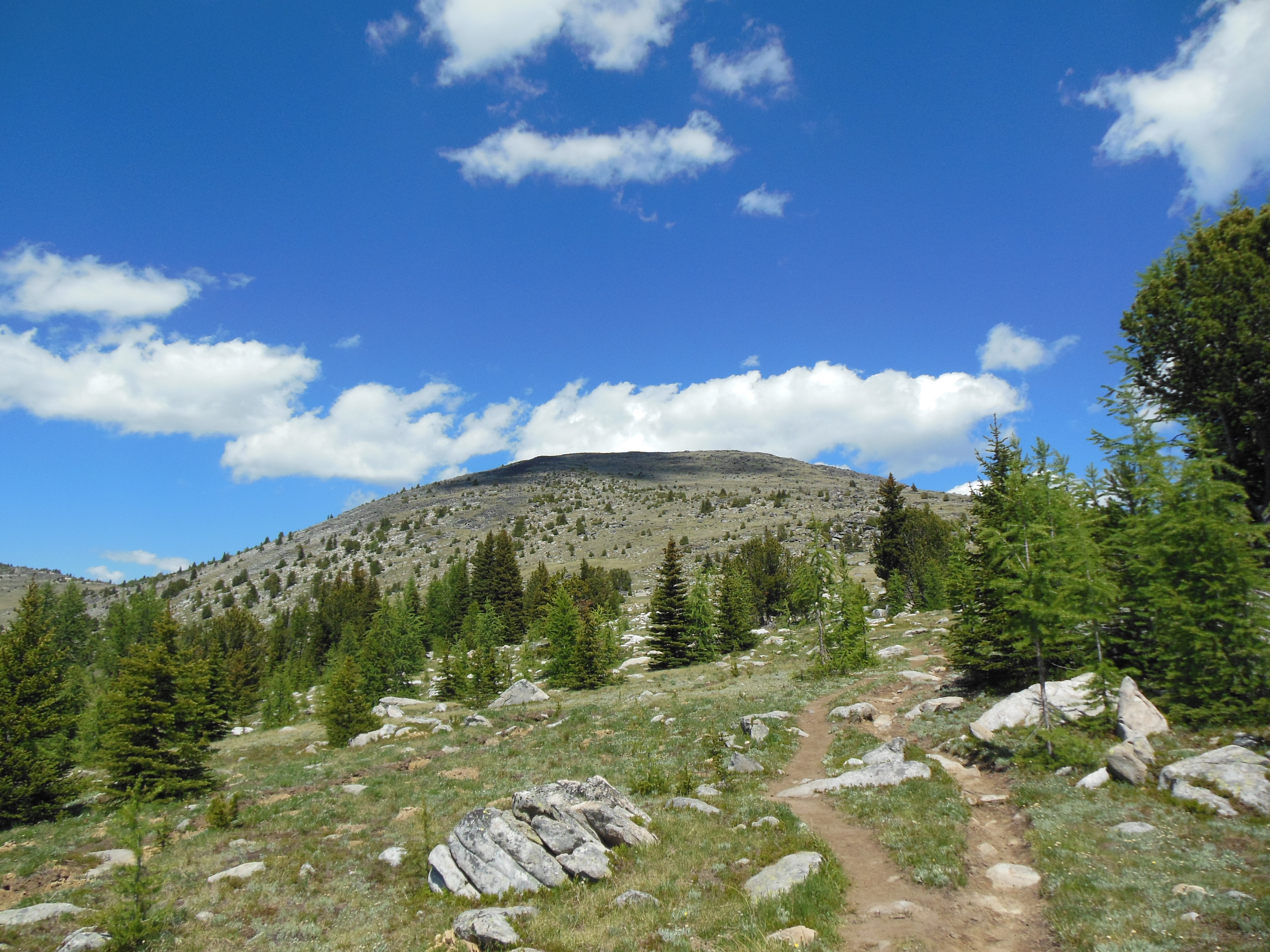
Tiffany Mountain's gentle south side

== See also ==
- Geography of the North Cascades
- Geology of the Pacific Northwest
