= Sherman Peak =

Mountain in Washington (state), United States

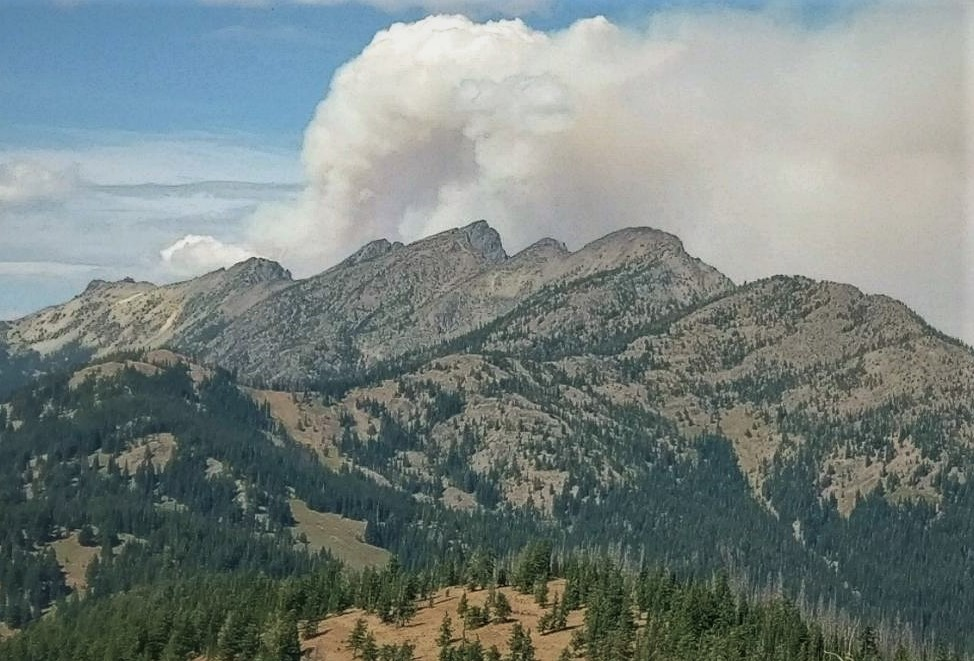
- South aspect of Sherman Peak / Isabella Ridge (smoke from 2017 Diamond Creek Fire beyond)

Highest point
- Elevation: 8,204 ft (2,501 m)
- Prominence: 404 ft (123 m)
- Parent peak: Big Craggy Peak (8,470 ft)
- Isolation: 1.98 mi (3.19 km)
- Coordinates: 48°44′04″N 120°19′35″W

Geography
- Location within Washington (state) Location within the United States
- Interactive map of Sherman Peak
- Country: United States
- State: Washington
- County: Okanogan
- Protected area: Okanogan–Wenatchee National Forest
- Parent range: Okanogan Range; North Cascades; Cascade Range
- Topo map: USGS Sweetgrass Butte

Sherman Peak is an 8,204-foot (2,501-metre) mountain summit located in western Okanogan County in Washington state. It is part of the Okanogan Range which is a subset of the North Cascades. This remote mountain is on Isabella Ridge, 10.5 mi (16.9 km) north-northeast of Mazama, on land administered by the Okanogan–Wenatchee National Forest. The nearest higher neighbor is Big Craggy Peak, 2 miles (3.2 km) to the north. Precipitation runoff from Sherman drains into tributaries of the Methow River.

== Climate ==
Weather fronts originating in the Pacific Ocean travel northeast toward the Cascade Mountains. As fronts approach the North Cascades, they are forced upward by the peaks of the Cascade Range (orographic lift), causing them to drop their moisture in the form of rain or snowfall onto the Cascades. As a result, the west side of the North Cascades experiences high precipitation, especially during the winter months in the form of snowfall. During winter months, weather is usually cloudy, but, due to high pressure systems over the Pacific Ocean that intensify during summer months, there is often little or no cloud cover during the summer. The months July through September offer the most favorable weather for visiting this area, however, smoke from distant wildfires may potentially reduce visibility, and smoky summer conditions have been increasing with climate change.

== Geology ==
The North Cascades features some of the most rugged topography in the Cascade Range with craggy peaks, spires, ridges, and deep glacial valleys. Geological events occurring many years ago created the diverse topography and drastic elevation changes over the Cascade Range leading to the various climate differences.

The history of the formation of the Cascade Mountains dates back millions of years ago to the late Eocene Epoch. With the North American Plate overriding the Pacific Plate, episodes of volcanic igneous activity persisted. In addition, small fragments of the oceanic and continental lithosphere called terranes created the North Cascades about 50 million years ago.

During the Pleistocene period dating back over two million years ago, glaciation advancing and retreating repeatedly scoured the landscape leaving deposits of rock debris. The U-shaped cross section of the river valleys is a result of recent glaciation. Uplift and faulting in combination with glaciation have been the dominant processes which have created the tall peaks and deep valleys of the North Cascades area.

== See also ==
- List of mountain peaks of Washington (state)
- Geography of the North Cascades
- Geology of the Pacific Northwest
