= Daemon Peak =

Mountain in Washington

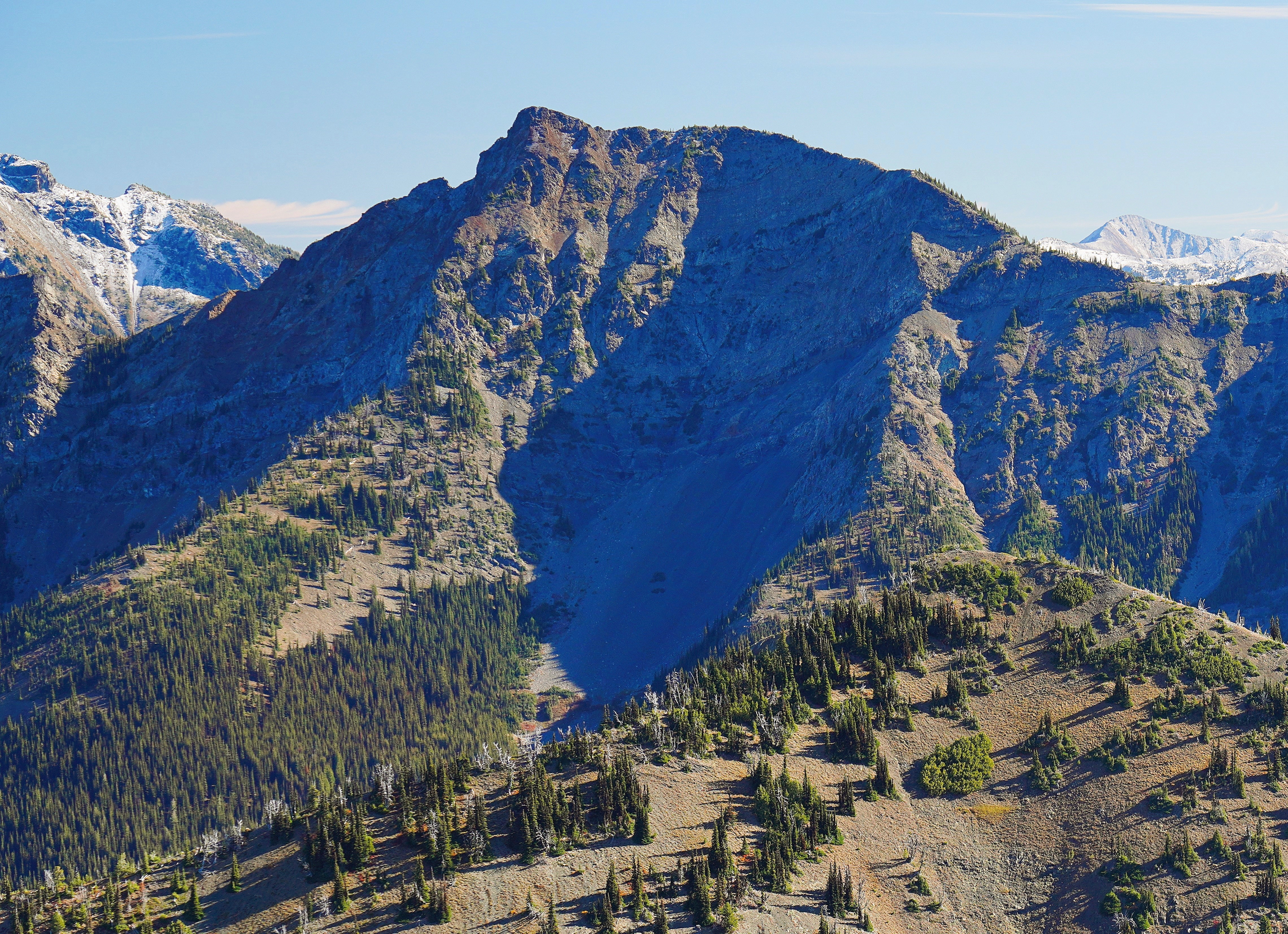
- West aspect

Highest point
- Elevation: 7,516 ft (2,291 m)
- Prominence: 2,214 ft (675 m)
- Parent peak: Shull Mountain
- Coordinates: 48°50′04″N 120°50′23″W

Geography
- Location within Washington (state) Location within the United States
- Country: United States
- State: Washington
- County: Whatcom
- Protected area: Pasayten Wilderness
- Parent range: Hozameen Range; North Cascades; Cascade Range
- Topo map: USGS Shull Mountain

Daemon Peak is a mountain located in the Hozameen Range of the North Cascades. It rises approximately 11 miles south of the Canada–United States border, and 8 miles from Ross Lake. Located in the Okanogan–Wenatchee National Forest, the summit is located about 10 miles north of Washington State Route 20.

== Etymology ==
Daemon Peak is the tallest peak in Washington that does not have an official name. The generally accepted name in the climbing community was given by Dr. John Roper, as he described the peak as "like the being between Heaven and Earth", and that the peak was close to many other prominent geographical features that are named after the devil, including Devil's Dome, Devil's Creek, and Devil's Park.

== Geography ==
It is about 7,516 ft (2291 m) in height. The environment surrounding the peak is a Dsc Köppen climate, characterized by little precipitation during dry season, and heavy snowfall in winter.

== See also ==
- Geography of the North Cascades
- Geology of the Pacific Northwest
