= Gardner Mountain =

Mountain in Washington, United States

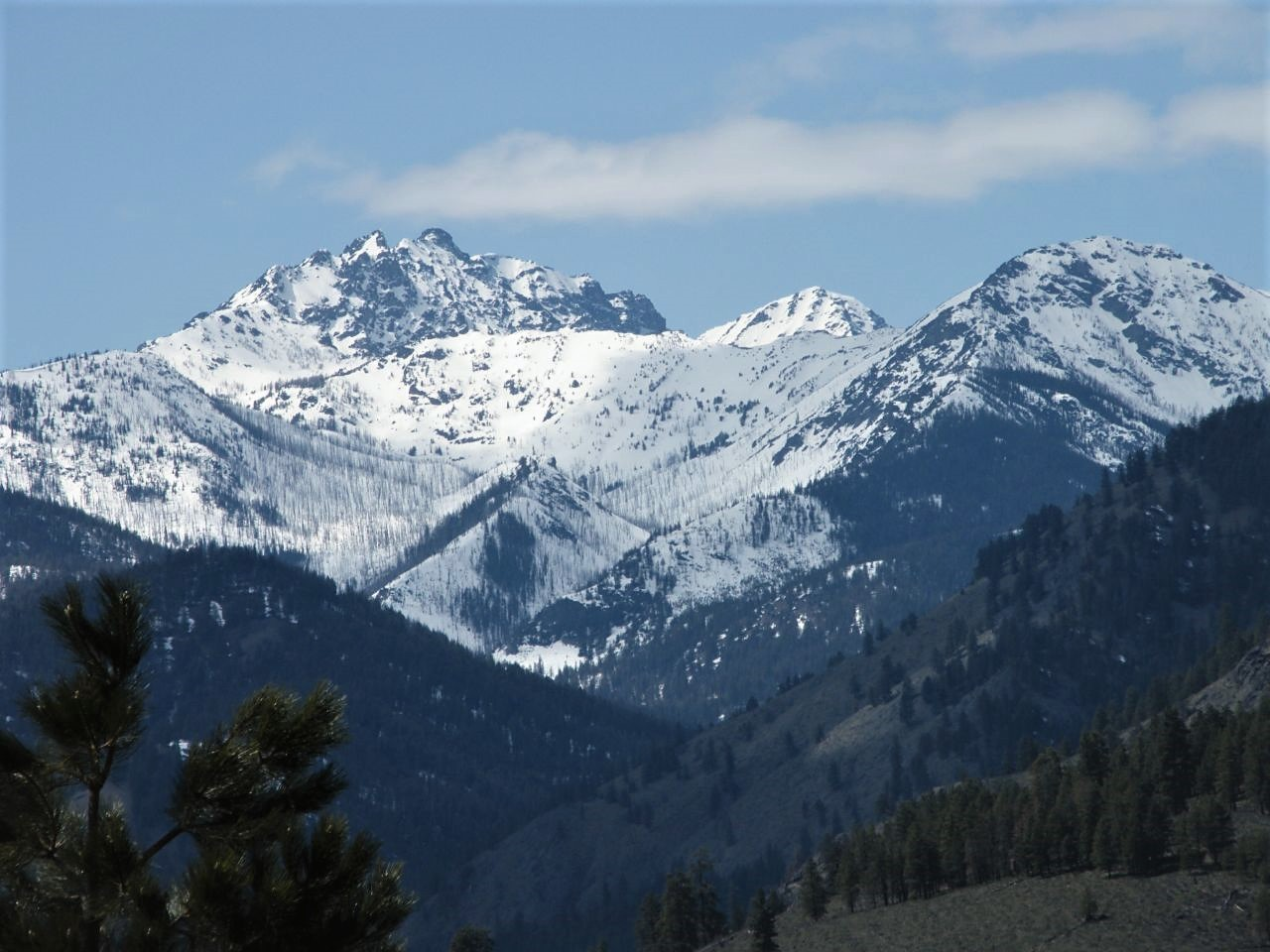
- East aspect (left of center)

Highest point
- Elevation: 8,898 ft (2,712 m)
- Prominence: 718 ft (219 m)
- Parent peak: North Gardner Mountain (8,956 ft)
- Isolation: 0.83 mi (1.34 km)
- Coordinates: 48°30′25″N 120°29′17″W

Naming
- Etymology: Isabella Stewart Gardner

Geography
- Location within Washington (state) Location within the United States
- Country: United States
- State: Washington
- County: Okanogan
- Protected area: Lake Chelan-Sawtooth Wilderness
- Parent range: Cascade Range; North Cascades; Methow Mountains
- Topo map: USGS Mazama

Geology
- Rock type(s): Sedimentary and Volcanic

Climbing
- First ascent: 1898 Albert Hale Sylvester
- Easiest route: class 2+ scrambling

Gardner Mountain is an 8,898-foot-elevation (2,712-meter) mountain summit in Okanogan County of Washington state.

== Description ==
Gardner Mountain is the second-highest peak in the Methow Mountains which are a subrange of the North Cascades. It is set on land administered by the Okanogan–Wenatchee National Forest and is the highest point of the Lake Chelan-Sawtooth Wilderness. Gardner ranks as the second-highest peak in Okanogan County and the 28th-highest summit in Washington. Precipitation runoff from the mountain's slopes drains into tributaries of the Methow River. Topographic relief is significant as the summit rises 3,300 feet (1,000 meters) above Wolf Creek in 1.5 mile (2.4 km). The town of Winthrop is 14 mi (23 km) to the east-southeast and Mazama is 7 mi (11 km) northeast.

== Climate ==
Weather fronts originating in the Pacific Ocean travel northeast toward the Cascade Mountains. As fronts approach the North Cascades, they are forced upward by the peaks of the Cascade Range (orographic lift), causing them to drop their moisture in the form of rain or snowfall onto the Cascades. As a result, the west side of the North Cascades experiences high precipitation, especially during the winter months in the form of snowfall. This climate supports two small glacier remnants on Gardner's northeast slope. During winter months, weather is usually cloudy, but due to high pressure systems over the Pacific Ocean that intensify during summer months, there is often little or no cloud cover during the summer. The months July through September offer the most favorable weather for viewing or climbing this peak.

== Geology ==
The North Cascades features some of the most rugged topography in the Cascade Range with craggy peaks, ridges, and deep glacial valleys. Geological events occurring many years ago created the diverse topography and drastic elevation changes over the Cascade Range leading to the various climate differences. These climate differences lead to vegetation variety defining the ecoregions in this area.

The history of the formation of the Cascade Mountains dates back millions of years ago to the late Eocene Epoch. With the North American Plate overriding the Pacific Plate, episodes of volcanic igneous activity persisted. In addition, small fragments of the oceanic and continental lithosphere called terranes created the North Cascades about 50 million years ago.

During the Pleistocene period dating back over two million years ago, glaciation advancing and retreating repeatedly scoured the landscape leaving deposits of rock debris. The U-shaped cross section of the river valleys is a result of recent glaciation. Uplift and faulting in combination with glaciation have been the dominant processes which have created the tall peaks and deep valleys of the North Cascades area.

== History ==
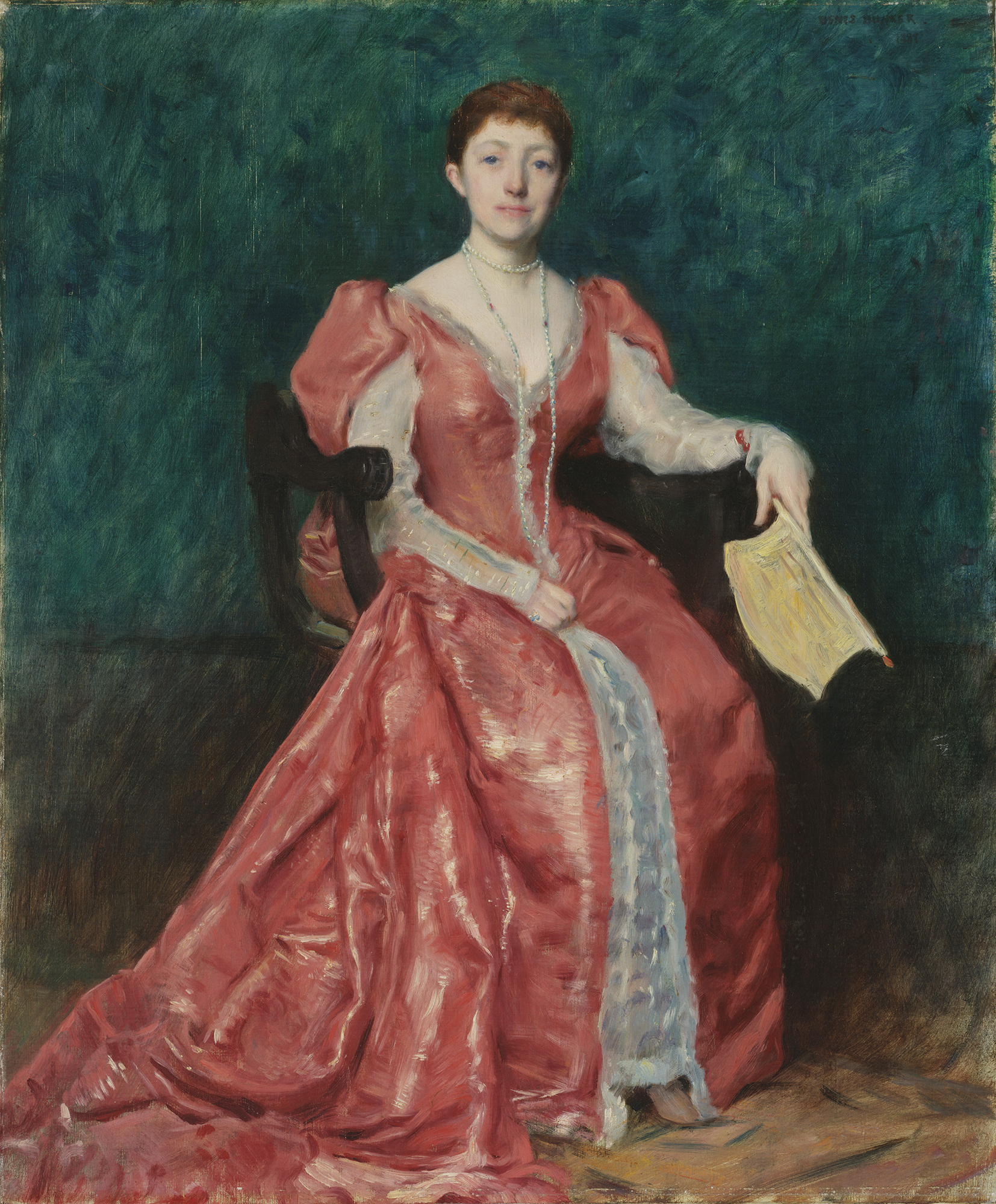
Isabella Stewart Gardner (1889 painting)

The mountain was named "Mt. Gardner" in 1891 by Guy Waring of Winthrop to honor Isabella Stewart Gardner (1840–1924). Further north, Isabella Ridge is also named after her. Waring was a friend of Isabella and he was a classmate of Isabella's brother-in-law, Joseph Gardner.

In 1898 or 1899, Albert Hale Sylvester and a USGS survey party climbed the mountain.

This mountain's toponym has been officially adopted by the U.S. Board on Geographic Names.

== See also ==
- Geography of the North Cascades
- Geology of the Pacific Northwest
