= Round Mountain (Washington) =

Mountain in Washington (state), United States

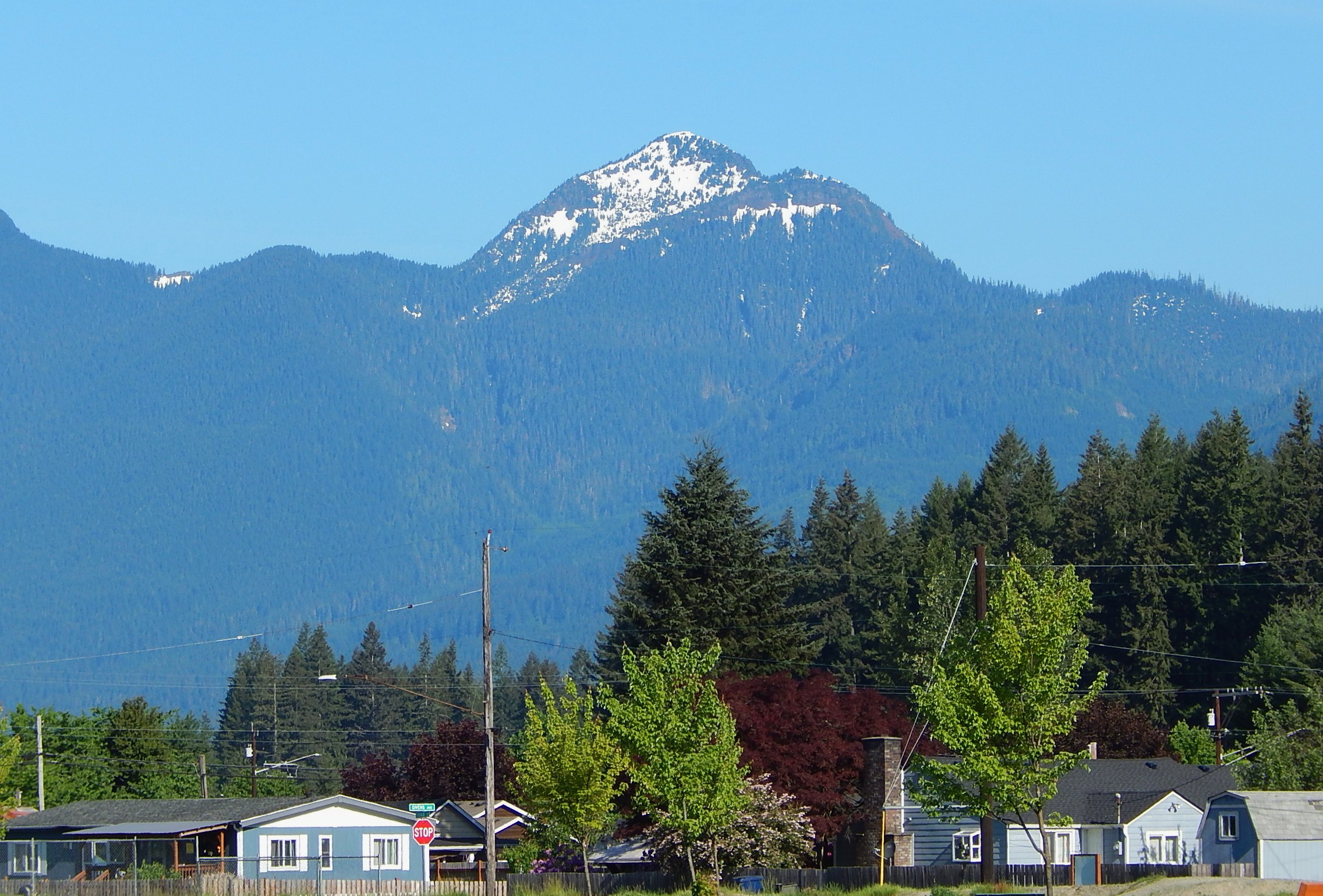
- Round Mountain seen from Darrington

Highest point
- Elevation: 5,369 ft (1,636 m)
- Prominence: 4,840 ft (1,475 m)
- Parent peak: Jumbo Mountain
- Isolation: 8.68 mi (13.97 km)
- Coordinates: 48°19′35″N 121°45′03″W

Geography
- Location within Washington (state) Location within the United States
- Country: United States
- State: Washington
- County: Skagit
- Parent range: Cascade Range
- Topo map: USGS Fortson

Climbing
- Easiest route: Scrambling class 2

Round Mountain is a 5,369-foot mountain summit at the western edge of the North Cascades, in Skagit County of Washington state. It is located nine miles northwest of Darrington, Washington, and is situated on land administered by the Mount Baker-Snoqualmie National Forest. Round Mountain is remarkable for its 4,840 feet of prominence which ranks as the most in Skagit County, and eighth-most of all the mountains in Washington state. The nearest higher peak is Whitehorse Mountain, 7.85 miles (12.63 km) to the south-southeast. Precipitation runoff from Round Mountain drains into tributaries of the Stillaguamish River.

== Climate ==
Round Mountain is located in the marine west coast climate zone of western North America. Most weather fronts coming off the Pacific Ocean travel northeast toward the Cascade Mountains. As fronts approach, they are forced upward by the peaks of the Cascade Range (orographic lift), causing them to drop their moisture in the form of rain or snowfall onto the Cascades. As a result, the west side of the North Cascades experiences high precipitation, especially during the winter months in the form of snowfall. During winter months, weather is usually cloudy, but, due to high pressure systems over the Pacific Ocean that intensify during summer months, there is often little or no cloud cover during the summer.

== Geology ==
The North Cascades features some of the most rugged topography in the Cascade Range with craggy peaks, ridges, and deep glacial valleys. Geological events occurring many years ago created the diverse topography and drastic elevation changes over the Cascade Range leading to the various climate differences. These climate differences lead to vegetation variety defining the ecoregions in this area.

The history of the formation of the Cascade Mountains dates back millions of years ago to the late Eocene Epoch. With the North American Plate overriding the Pacific Plate, episodes of volcanic igneous activity persisted. In addition, small fragments of the oceanic and continental lithosphere called terranes created the North Cascades about 50 million years ago.

During the Pleistocene period dating back over two million years ago, glaciation advancing and retreating repeatedly scoured the landscape leaving deposits of rock debris. The U-shaped cross section of the river valleys is a result of recent glaciation. Uplift and faulting in combination with glaciation have been the dominant processes which have created the tall peaks and deep valleys of the North Cascades area.

== See also ==
- List of the most prominent summits of the United States
- List of mountain peaks of Washington (state)
