= Shull Mountain =

Mountain in Washington state, United States

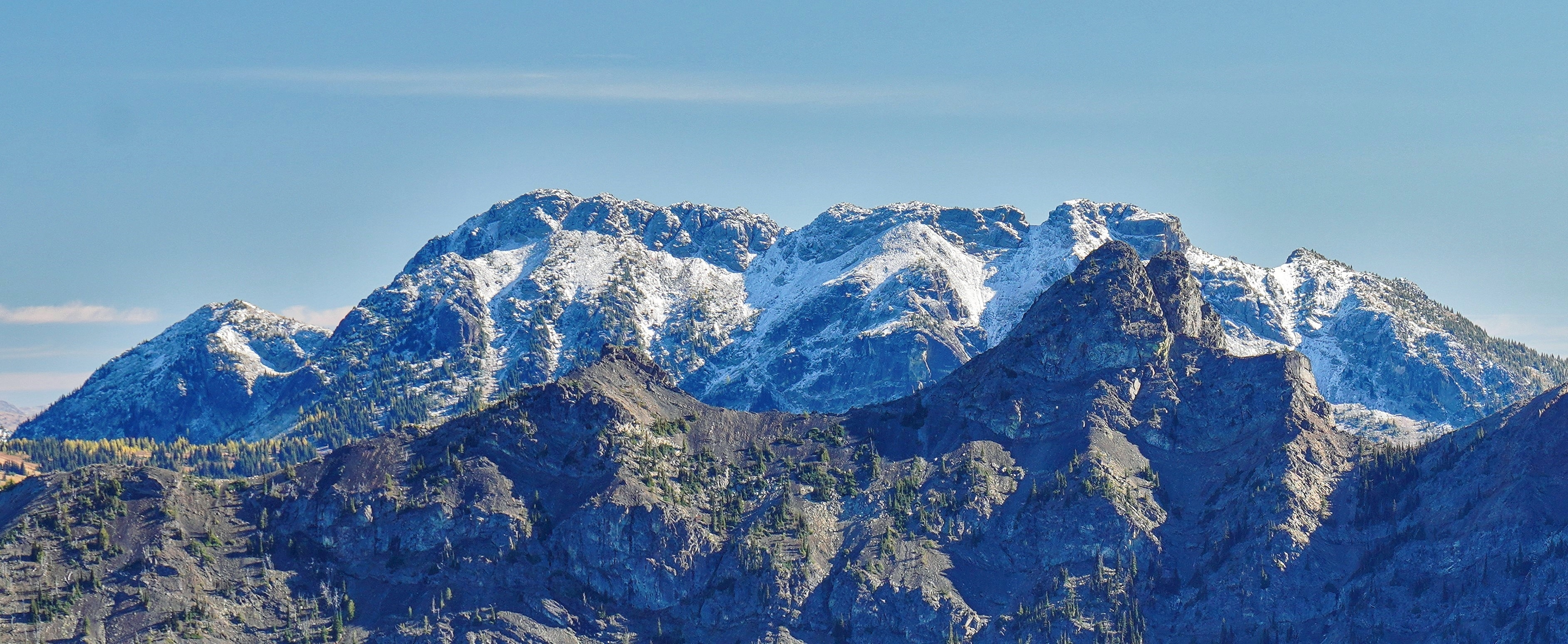
- West aspect

Highest point
- Elevation: 7,841 ft (2,390 m)
- Prominence: 1,212 ft (369 m)
- Parent peak: Three Fools Peak (7,955 ft)
- Isolation: 3.05 mi (4.91 km)
- Coordinates: 48°51′26″N 120°46′28″W

Geography
- Location within Washington (state) Location within the United States
- Interactive map of Shull Mountain
- Country: United States
- State: Washington
- County: Whatcom
- Protected area: Pasayten Wilderness
- Parent range: Cascade Range; North Cascades; Hozameen Range
- Topo map: USGS Shull Mountain

Shull Mountain is a 7,841-foot (2,390-metre) double-summit mountain located in Whatcom County of Washington state, United States. The mountain is situated approximately one mile west of the Cascade crest in the Pasayten Wilderness, on land administered by Okanogan–Wenatchee National Forest. Shull Mountain is part of the Hozameen Range which is a subset of the North Cascades. The rugged, ridge-like mountain's North Peak is the highest point, and the South Peak is about 50 feet lower at 7,791 feet, with about 0.38 mile separating the two peaks. Precipitation runoff from the mountain drains to Ross Lake via Shull Creek, Trouble Creek, and Canyon Creek. Topographic relief is significant as the summit rises over 1,000 feet (305 meters) above Shull Lake in one-half mile, 2,440 feet (744 meters) above Canyon Creek in one mile, and 3,600 feet (1,097 meters) above Shull Creek in two miles. The mountain's toponym has been officially adopted by the U.S. Board on Geographic Names.

== Geology ==
The North Cascades features some of the most rugged topography in the Cascade Range with craggy peaks, granite spires, ridges, and deep glacial valleys. Geological events occurring many years ago created the diverse topography and drastic elevation changes over the Cascade Range leading to various climate differences.

The history of the formation of the Cascade Mountains dates back millions of years ago to the late Eocene Epoch. With the North American Plate overriding the Pacific Plate, episodes of volcanic igneous activity persisted. In addition, small fragments of the oceanic and continental lithosphere called terranes created the North Cascades about 50 million years ago.

During the Pleistocene period dating back over two million years ago, glaciation advancing and retreating repeatedly scoured the landscape leaving deposits of rock debris. The U-shaped cross section of the river valleys is a result of recent glaciation. Uplift and faulting in combination with glaciation have been the dominant processes which have created the tall peaks and deep valleys of the North Cascades area.

== Climate ==
Shull Mountain is located in the marine west coast climate zone of western North America. Weather fronts originating in the Pacific Ocean travel northeast toward the Cascade Mountains. As fronts approach the North Cascades they are forced upward by the peaks of the Cascade Range, causing them to drop their moisture in the form of rain or snowfall onto the Cascades. As a result, the west side of the North Cascades experiences high precipitation, especially during the winter months in the form of snowfall. Due to its temperate climate and proximity to the Pacific Ocean, areas west of the Cascade Crest very rarely experience temperatures below 0 °F (−18 °C) or above 80 °F (27 °C). During winter months, weather is usually cloudy, but due to high pressure systems over the Pacific Ocean that intensify during summer months, there is often little or no cloud cover during the summer. Because of maritime influence, snow tends to be wet and heavy, resulting in high avalanche danger. The months of July through September offer the most favorable weather for viewing or climbing this peak.

== See also ==
- Geography of the North Cascades
- Geology of the Pacific Northwest
