= Mission Peak (Washington) =

Mountain in the U.S. state of Washington

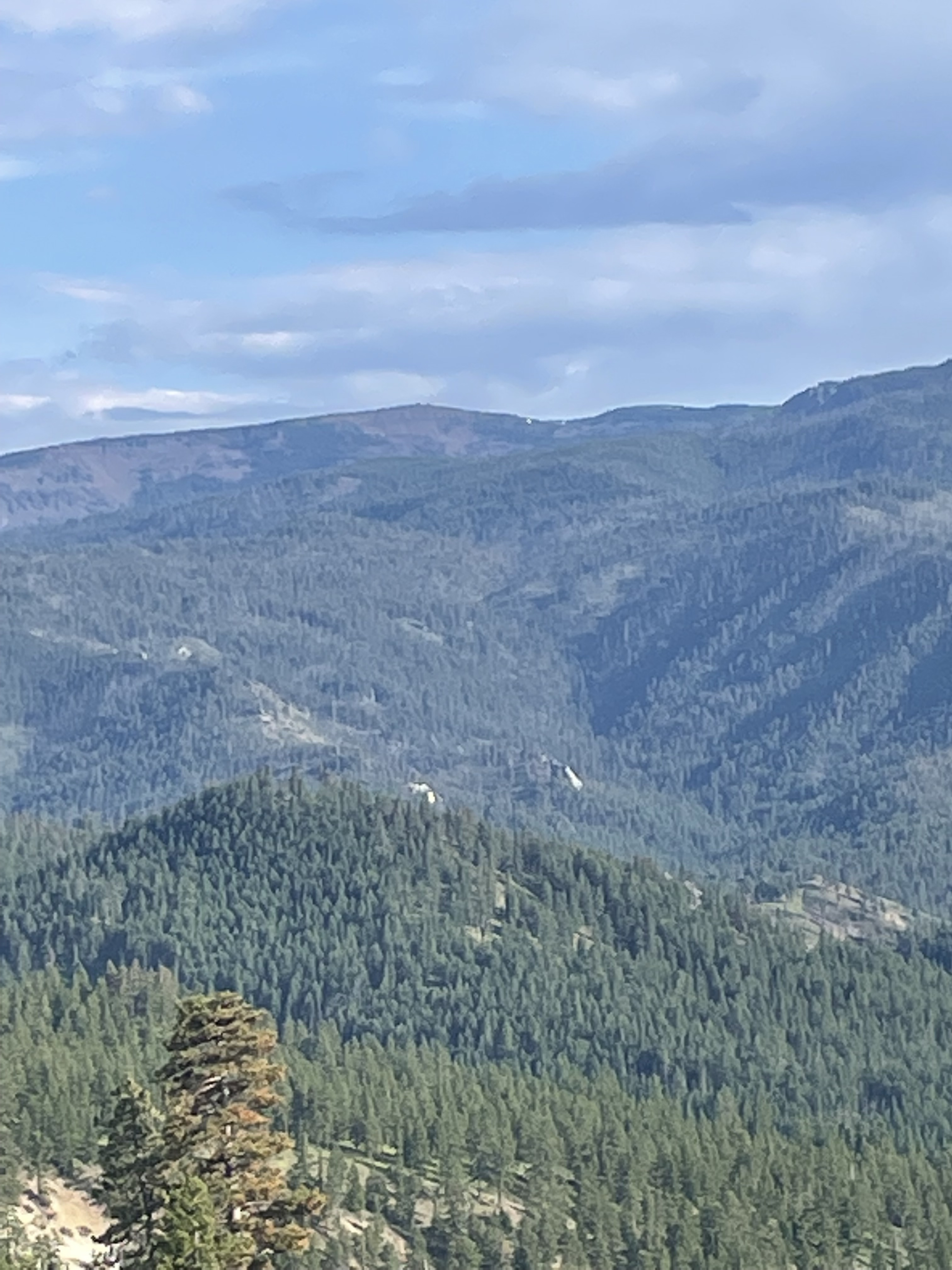
- Mission Peak from the north

Highest point
- Elevation: 6,880 ft (2,100 m)
- Prominence: 2796 ft (852 m)
- Coordinates: 47°17′5″N 120°26′28″W

Geography
- Location within Washington (state)
- State(s): Washington State, US
- Region(s): Chelan County and Kittitas County
- Parent range: Wenatchee Mountains

Mission Peak is a mountain peak located in the Wenatchee Mountains, along the border of Chelan and Kittitas counties in Washington state. The peak is located within the Wenatchee National forest, adjacent to the Mission Ridge Ski Area. Mission Creek, a tributary of the Wenatchee River, flows down from the summit joining the right bank of the Wenatchee at Cashmere, Washington

== Environment ==
The environment surrounding the peak is a Dsc Köppen climate., covered in snow from late November to early June, with next to no precipitation in the dry season (June to September). Given its location along the crest of the Wenatchee Mountains, the peak experiences high wind speeds with gusts recorded in excess of 135 mph.
