= Dirtyface Peak =

Mountain in Washington (state), United States

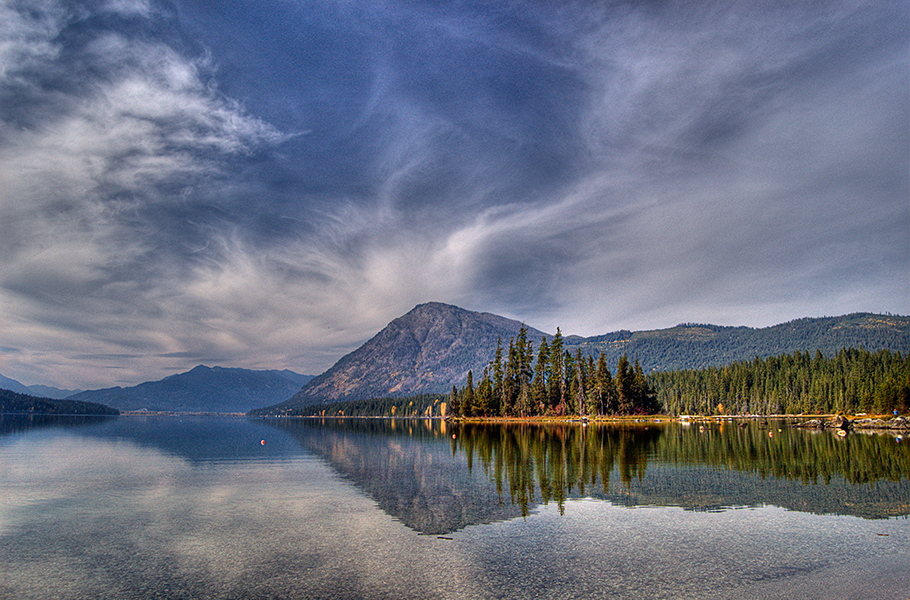
- Dirtyface Peak is a mountain near Lake Wenatchee, WA Lake Wenatchee

Highest point
- Elevation: 6,240+ ft (1,900+ m)
- Prominence: 3,320 ft (1,010 m)
- Parent peak: Mount Sylvester (6,913 ft)
- Isolation: 4.54 mi (7.31 km)
- Coordinates: 47°52′17″N 120°49′31″W

Geography
- Location within Washington (state) Location within the United States
- Interactive map of Dirtyface Peak
- Location: Glacier Peak Wilderness; Chelan County, Washington, U.S.
- Parent range: North Cascades; Cascade Range
- Topo map: USGS Lake Wenatchee

Climbing
- Easiest route: scrambling

Dirtyface Peak is a prominent mountain summit located immediately northwest of Lake Wenatchee in Chelan County, Washington of the United States. With an elevation of 6,243 feet (1,903 m), Dirtyface Peak is the 728th highest summit in the state of Washington. It is a 9.5 mile scramble with 4,300 ft of gain. Dirtyface Peak is the highest point of Dirtyface Mountain. This peak is set on land managed by the Okanogan–Wenatchee National Forest.

== Geology ==
The North Cascades features some of the most rugged topography in the Cascade Range with craggy peaks, ridges, and deep glacial valleys. Geological events occurring many years ago created the diverse topography and drastic elevation changes over the Cascade Range leading to various climate differences.

The history of the formation of the Cascade Mountains dates back millions of years ago to the late Eocene Epoch. With the North American Plate overriding the Pacific Plate, episodes of volcanic igneous activity persisted. In addition, small fragments of the oceanic and continental lithosphere called terranes created the North Cascades about 50 million years ago. During the Pleistocene period dating back over two million years ago, glaciation advancing and retreating repeatedly scoured and shaped the landscape. Glaciation was most prevalent approximately 18,000 years ago, and most valleys were ice-free by 12,000 years ago. Uplift and faulting in combination with glaciation have been the dominant processes which have created the tall peaks and deep valleys of the North Cascades area.

== Gallery ==
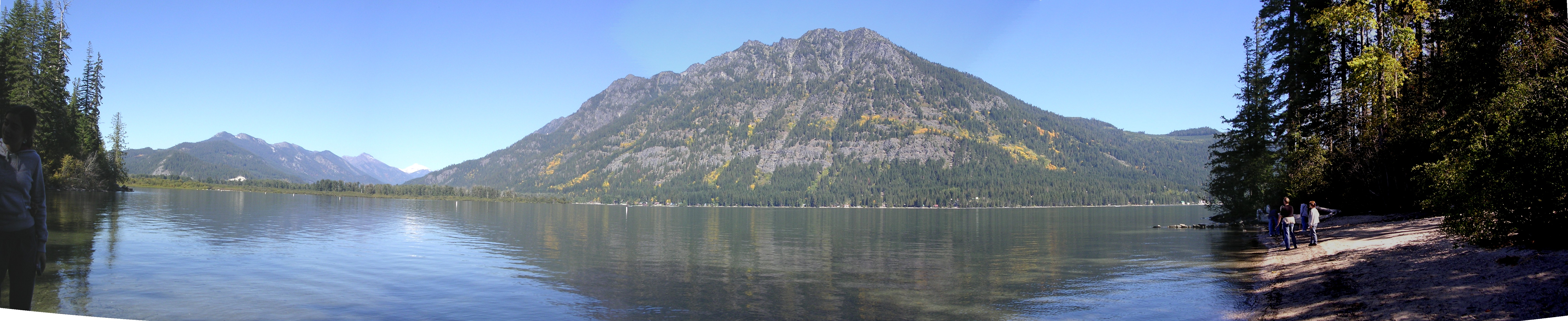
Dirtyface from Lake Wenatchee

== See also ==
- Geology of the Pacific Northwest
- Geography of the North Cascades
