= Three Fools Peak =

Mountain in Washington (state), United States

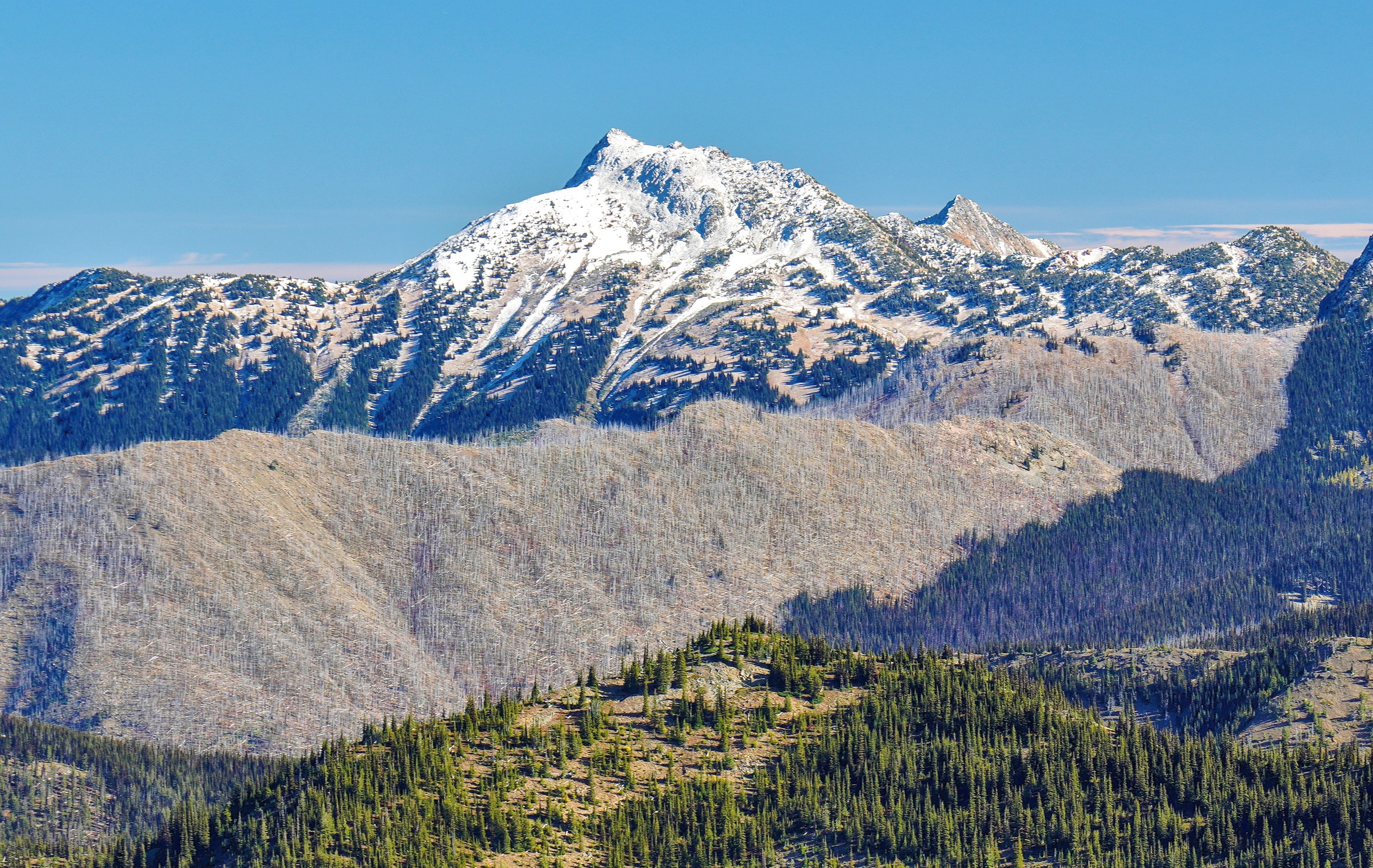
- Southwest aspect

Highest point
- Elevation: 7,955 ft (2,425 m)
- Prominence: 2,501 ft (762 m)
- Parent peak: Castle Peak (8,343 ft)
- Isolation: 7.2 mi (11.6 km)
- Coordinates: 48°54′02″N 120°45′48″W

Geography
- Location within Washington (state) Location within the United States
- Interactive map of Three Fools Peak
- Country: United States
- State: Washington
- County: Okanogan / Whatcom
- Protected area: Pasayten Wilderness
- Parent range: Hozameen Range; North Cascades; Cascade Range
- Topo map: USGS Castle Peak

Three Fools Peak is a mountain peak of the Hozameen Range, located on the boundary shared by Okanogan County and Whatcom County in Washington, United States.

The summit is 7,955 ft (2,425 m) in elevation. The mountain is situated in the Pasayten Wilderness on land managed by the Okanogan–Wenatchee National Forest.

== Climate ==
Weather fronts originating in the Pacific Ocean travel northeast toward the Cascade Mountains. As fronts approach the North Cascades, they are forced upward by the peaks of the Cascade Range (orographic lift), causing them to drop their moisture in the form of rain or snowfall onto the Cascades. As a result, the west side of the North Cascades experiences higher precipitation than the east side, especially during the winter months in the form of snowfall. During winter months, weather is usually cloudy, but due to high pressure systems over the Pacific Ocean that intensify during summer months, there is often little or no cloud cover during the summer. However, smoke from distant wildfires may potentially reduce visibility, and smoky summer conditions have been increasing with climate change.

== Geology ==
The North Cascades features some of the most rugged topography in the Cascade Range with craggy peaks, spires, ridges, and deep glacial valleys. Geological events occurring many years ago created the diverse topography and drastic elevation changes over the Cascade Range leading to the various climate differences.

The history of the formation of the Cascade Mountains dates back millions of years ago to the late Eocene Epoch. With the North American Plate overriding the Pacific Plate, episodes of volcanic igneous activity persisted. In addition, small fragments of the oceanic and continental lithosphere called terranes created the North Cascades about 50 million years ago.

During the Pleistocene period dating back over two million years ago, glaciation advancing and retreating repeatedly scoured the landscape leaving deposits of rock debris. The U-shaped cross section of the river valleys is a result of recent glaciation. Uplift and faulting in combination with glaciation have been the dominant processes which have created the tall peaks and deep valleys of the North Cascades area.

== See also ==
- Geography of the North Cascades
- Geology of the Pacific Northwest
- List of mountain peaks of Washington (state)
