= Windy Peak (Washington) =

Mountain in Washington (state), United States

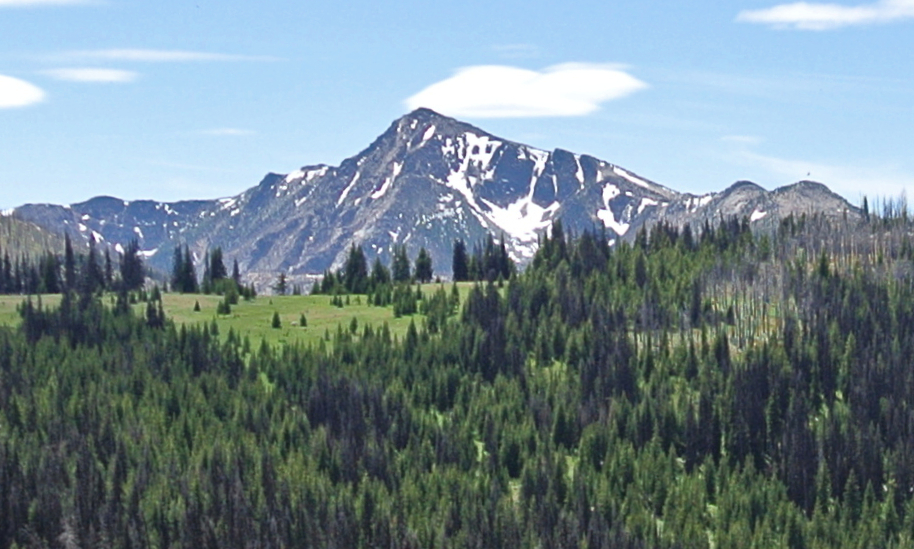
- Windy Peak from Horseshoe Basin

Highest point
- Elevation: 8,335 ft (2,541 m)
- Prominence: 1,773 ft (540 m)
- Listing: Washington major summits 36th
- Coordinates: 48°57′41″N 119°58′14″W

Geography
- Location within Washington (state) Location within the United States
- Interactive map of Windy Peak
- Country: United States
- State: Washington
- County: Okanogan
- Protected area: Pasayten Wilderness
- Parent range: Okanogan Range; North Cascades; Cascade Range
- Topo map: USGS Horseshoe Basin

Climbing
- Easiest route: Hiking via Windy Trail

Windy Peak is an 8,335-foot (2,541-metre) mountain summit located in Okanogan County in Washington state. It is part of the Okanogan Range which is a sub-range of the North Cascades and Cascade Range. The mountain is situated five miles (8.0 km) south of the Canada–United States border, on the east side of the Cascade crest, in the Pasayten Wilderness, on land managed by the Okanogan–Wenatchee National Forest. The nearest higher peak is Haystack Mountain, 9.24 miles (14.87 km) to the northwest in Canada. Precipitation runoff from Windy Peak drains into tributaries of the Methow River and Similkameen River.

== Climate ==
Weather fronts originating in the Pacific Ocean travel northeast toward the Cascade Mountains. As fronts approach the North Cascades, they are forced upward by the peaks (orographic lift), causing them to drop their moisture in the form of rain or snowfall onto the Cascades. As a result, the west side of the North Cascades experiences higher precipitation than the east side, especially during the winter months in the form of snowfall. During winter months, weather is usually cloudy, but due to high pressure systems over the Pacific Ocean that intensify during summer months, there is often little or no cloud cover during the summer.

== Geology ==
The North Cascades features some of the most rugged topography in the Cascade Range with craggy peaks, spires, ridges, and deep glacial valleys. Geological events occurring many years ago created the diverse topography and drastic elevation changes over the Cascade Range leading to the various climate differences. The history of the formation of the Cascade Mountains dates back millions of years ago to the late Eocene Epoch. With the North American Plate overriding the Pacific Plate, episodes of volcanic igneous activity persisted. In addition, small fragments of the oceanic and continental lithosphere called terranes created the North Cascades about 50 million years ago.

During the Pleistocene period dating back over two million years ago, glaciation advancing and retreating repeatedly scoured the landscape leaving deposits of rock debris. The U-shaped cross section of the river valleys is a result of recent glaciation. Uplift and faulting in combination with glaciation have been the dominant processes which have created the tall peaks and deep valleys of the North Cascades area.

== Gallery ==
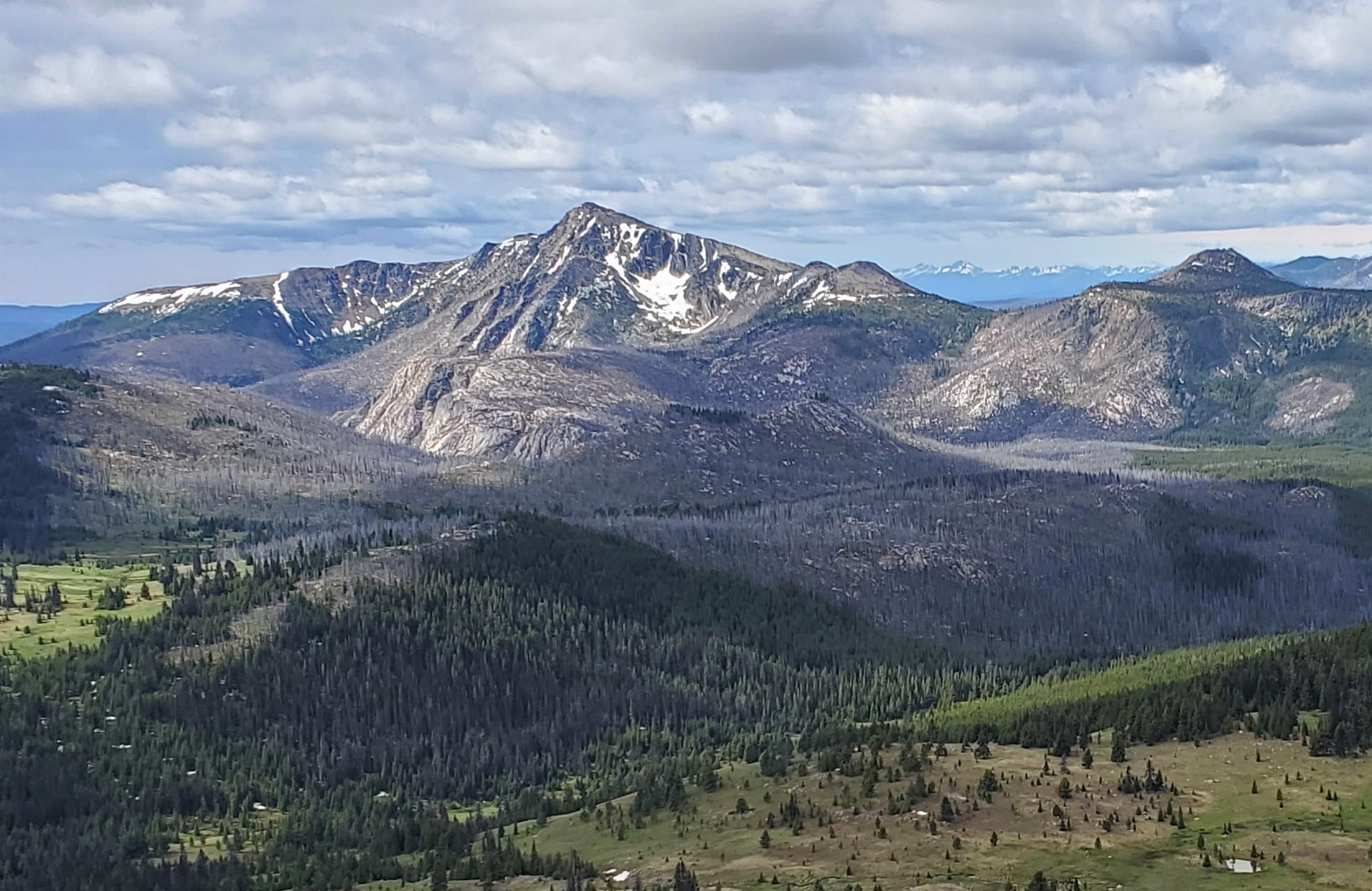
Windy Peak from the north

== See also ==
- List of mountain peaks of Washington (state)
- Geography of the North Cascades
- Geology of the Pacific Northwest
