= Big Craggy Peak =

Mountain in Washington (state), United States

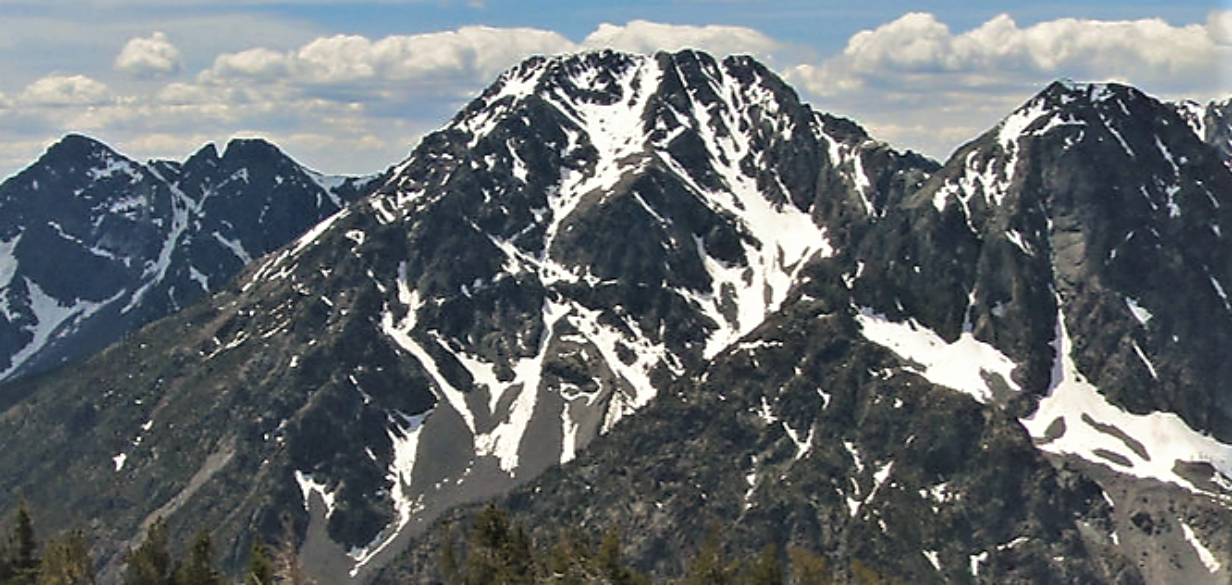
- Big Craggy Peak seen from northeast

Highest point
- Elevation: 8,478 ft (2,584 m)
- Prominence: 3,133 ft (955 m)
- Parent peak: Monument Peak (8,592 ft)
- Isolation: 0.96 mi (1.54 km)
- Listing: Highest Peaks in Washington
- Coordinates: 48°45′46″N 120°19′41″W

Geography
- Location within Washington (state) Location within the United States
- Interactive map of Big Craggy Peak
- Country: United States
- State: Washington
- County: Okanogan
- Protected area: Okanogan–Wenatchee National Forest
- Parent range: Okanogan Range; North Cascades; Cascade Range
- Topo map: USGS Billy Goat Mountain

Climbing
- Easiest route: class 2+ scrambling

Big Craggy Peak is a prominent 8,478-foot (2,584-metre) mountain summit in western Okanogan County of Washington state, USA. It is part of the Okanogan Range which is a subrange of the North Cascades. This remote mountain is located 12.5 mi (20.1 km) north-northeast of Mazama on land administered by the Okanogan–Wenatchee National Forest. Big Craggy has two subsidiary peaks, North Peak (8,205-ft), and West Craggy (8,372-ft), the latter set on the Pasayten Wilderness boundary. The nearest higher peak is Monument Peak, 10 miles (16 km) to the west-northwest. Big Craggy Peak ranks 60th on Washington's highest 100 peaks, and 62nd on the "Bulger List". Precipitation runoff from Big Craggy drains into Eightmile Creek which is a tributary of the Chewuch River. Topographic relief is significant as the summit rises approximately 4,400 feet (1,300 meters) above Eightmile Creek in 1.25 mile (2 km).

== Climate ==
Most weather fronts originating in the Pacific Ocean travel northeast toward the Cascade Mountains. As fronts approach the North Cascades, they are forced upward by the peaks of the Cascade Range (orographic lift), causing them to drop their moisture in the form of rain or snowfall onto the Cascades. As a result, the west side of the North Cascades experiences high precipitation, especially during the winter months in the form of snowfall. During winter months, weather is usually cloudy, but due to high pressure systems over the Pacific Ocean that intensify during summer months, there is often little or no cloud cover during the summer.

== Geology ==
The North Cascades features some of the most rugged topography in the Cascade Range with craggy peaks, spires, ridges, and deep glacial valleys. Geological events occurring many years ago created the diverse topography and drastic elevation changes over the Cascade Range leading to the various climate differences.

The history of the formation of the Cascade Mountains dates back millions of years ago to the late Eocene Epoch. With the North American Plate overriding the Pacific Plate, episodes of volcanic igneous activity persisted. In addition, small fragments of the oceanic and continental lithosphere called terranes created the North Cascades about 50 million years ago.

During the Pleistocene period dating back over two million years ago, glaciation advancing and retreating repeatedly scoured the landscape leaving deposits of rock debris. The U-shaped cross section of the river valleys is a result of recent glaciation. Uplift and faulting in combination with glaciation have been the dominant processes which have created the tall peaks and deep valleys of the North Cascades area.

== See also ==
- List of mountain peaks of Washington (state)
- Geography of the North Cascades
- Geology of the Pacific Northwest
