= Gabriel Peak (Washington) =

Mountain in Washington (state), United States

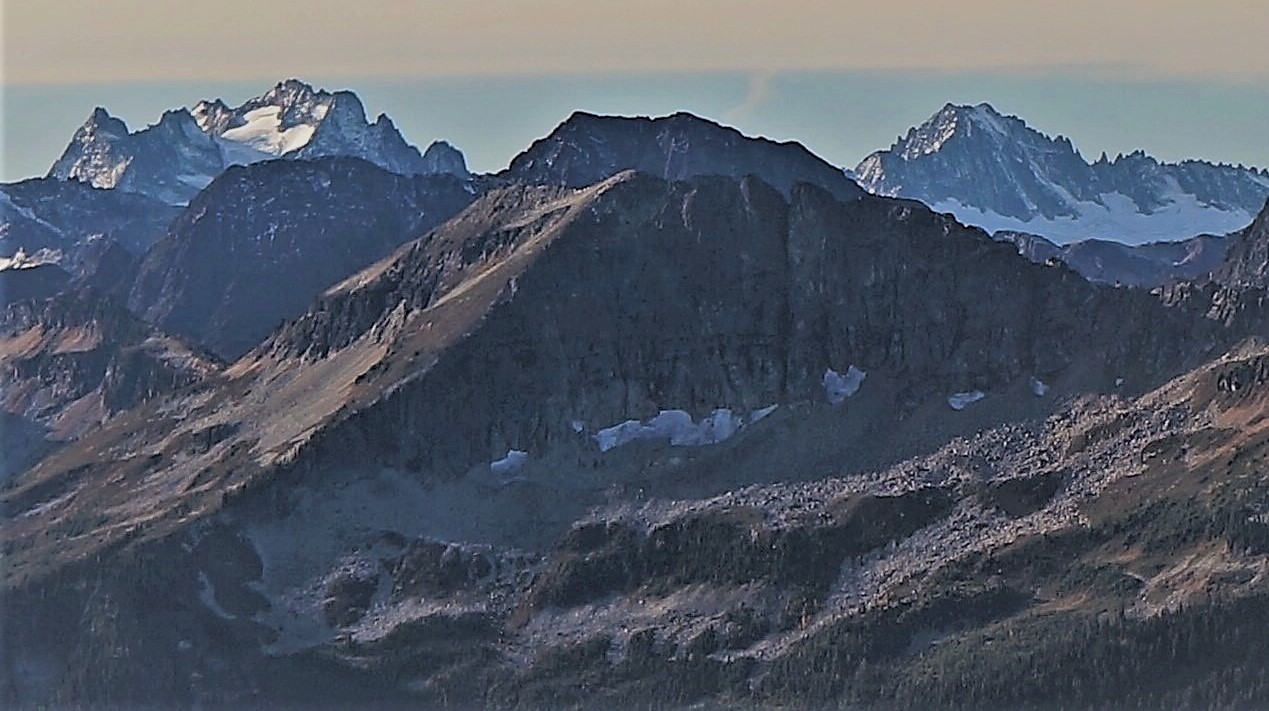
- Beebe Mountain (front center), Gabriel Peak (back center), Mt. Logan (left), Mt. Buckner (right) seen from Crater Mountain.

Highest point
- Elevation: 7,920 ft (2,410 m)
- Prominence: 1,920 ft (590 m)
- Parent peak: Kitling Peak (8,003 ft)
- Isolation: 2.70 mi (4.35 km)
- Coordinates: 48°37′38″N 120°55′45″W

Geography
- Location within Washington (state) Location within the United States
- Location: North Cascades National Park; Skagit County, Washington, U.S.
- Parent range: North Cascades; Cascade Range
- Topo map: USGS Crater Mountain

Climbing
- Easiest route: South slope

Gabriel Peak is a prominent 7,920-foot (2,410 m)-elevation mountain summit located in North Cascades National Park, in Skagit County of Washington state. It is part of the North Cascades which is a subset of the Cascade Range. The nearest higher neighbor is Cosho Peak, 2.7 miles (4.3 km) to the south, Beebe Mountain is set 2.5 miles (4.0 km) to the north, and Red Mountain is 3 miles (4.8 km) to the southwest. Precipitation runoff from this feature drains to Ross Lake via Gabriel and Panther Creeks. Like many North Cascade peaks, Gabriel Peak is more notable for its large, steep rise above local terrain than for its absolute elevation. Topographic relief is significant as it rises 4,700 feet (1,400 m) above the Panther Creek valley in approximately one mile. This geographical feature is named after the archangel Gabriel, which is a reference to Tommy Rowland who settled in the Skagit River area in 1895 and later pronounced himself the "Prophet Elisha." Mount Prophet, Genesis Peak, and nearby Elija Ridge were also named in association with Rowland.

== Climate ==
Gabriel Peak is located in the marine west coast climate zone of western North America. Most weather fronts originate in the Pacific Ocean, and travel northeast toward the Cascade Mountains. As fronts approach the North Cascades, they are forced upward by the peaks of the Cascade Range, causing them to drop their moisture in the form of rain or snowfall onto the Cascades (Orographic lift). As a result, the west side of the North Cascades experiences high precipitation, especially during the winter months in the form of snowfall. During winter months, weather is usually cloudy, but, due to high pressure systems over the Pacific Ocean that intensify during summer months, there is often little or no cloud cover during the summer. Because of maritime influence, snow tends to be wet and heavy, resulting in high avalanche danger. The months July through September offer the most favorable weather for viewing or climbing Gabriel Peak.

== Geology ==
The North Cascades features some of the most rugged topography in the Cascade Range with craggy peaks and ridges and deep glacial valleys. Geological events occurring many years ago created the diverse topography and drastic elevation changes over the Cascade Range leading to the various climate differences. These climate differences lead to vegetation variety defining the ecoregions in this area.

The history of the formation of the Cascade Mountains dates back millions of years ago to the late Eocene Epoch. With the North American Plate overriding the Pacific Plate, episodes of volcanic igneous activity persisted. In addition, small fragments of the oceanic and continental lithosphere called terranes created the North Cascades about 50 million years ago.

During the Pleistocene period dating back over two million years ago, glaciation advancing and retreating repeatedly scoured the landscape leaving deposits of rock debris. The U-shaped cross section of the river valleys is a result of recent glaciation. Uplift and faulting in combination with glaciation have been the dominant processes which have created the tall peaks and deep valleys of the North Cascades area.

== See also ==
- Geography of the North Cascades
- Geology of the Pacific Northwest
