= Elija Ridge =

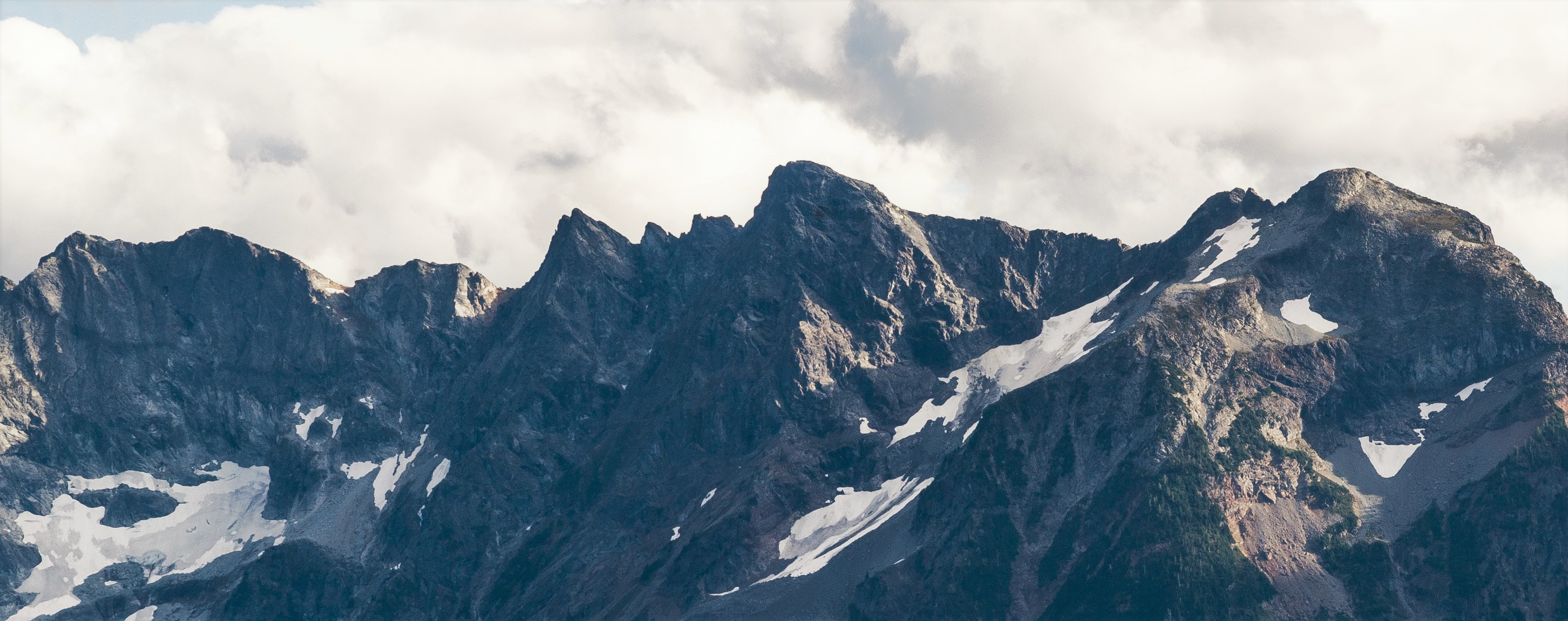
- Elija Ridge seen from Little Jack

Highest point
- Elevation: 7,739 ft (2,359 m)
- Prominence: 2,019 ft (615 m)
- Parent peak: Gabriel Peak (7,940 ft)
- Isolation: 1.93 mi (3.11 km)
- Coordinates: 48°39′01″N 120°57′36″W

Geography
- Location within Washington (state) Location within the United States
- Interactive map of Elija Ridge
- Country: United States
- State: Washington
- County: Whatcom
- Protected area: North Cascades National Park
- Parent range: North Cascades; Cascade Range
- Topo map: USGS Crater Mountain

Climbing
- Easiest route: Scrambling

Elija Ridge is a prominent 7,739 ft (2,360 m) ridge located in North Cascades National Park, in Whatcom County of Washington state. It is part of the North Cascades which is a subset of the Cascade Range. The highest point is called Elija Peak, and another peak on this ridge with sufficient prominence to qualify as a separate summit is called Ezekiel, (7,521 ft; 2,292 m). The nearest higher neighbor is Gabriel Peak, 1.9 miles (3.1 km) to the southeast, Beebe Mountain is set 1.86 miles (2.99 km) to the northeast, and Ruby Mountain is 4.86 miles (7.82 km) to the northwest. Precipitation runoff from this ridge drains to Ross Lake via Panther Creek. This geographical feature is named after the prophet Elija, which is a reference to Tommy Rowland who settled in the Skagit River area in 1895 and later pronounced himself the "Prophet Elisha." Gabriel Peak, Genesis Peak, and Mount Prophet are also named in association with Rowland.

== Climate ==
Elija Ridge is located in the marine west coast climate zone of western North America. This climate supports several small glaciers on the north slope. Weather fronts originating in the Pacific Ocean travel northeast toward the Cascade Mountains. As fronts approach the North Cascades, they are forced upward by the peaks of the Cascade Range (orographic lift), causing them to drop their moisture in the form of rain or snowfall onto the Cascades. As a result, the west side of the North Cascades experiences high precipitation, especially during the winter months in the form of snowfall. Because of maritime influence, snow tends to be wet and heavy, resulting in avalanche danger. During winter months, weather is usually cloudy, but due to high pressure systems over the Pacific Ocean that intensify during summer months, there is often little or no cloud cover during the summer. The months of July through September offer the most favorable weather for viewing or climbing the peaks of Elija Ridge.

== Geology ==
The North Cascades features some of the most rugged topography in the Cascade Range with craggy peaks and ridges and deep glacial valleys. Geological events occurring many years ago created the diverse topography and drastic elevation changes over the Cascade Range leading to the various climate differences. These climate differences lead to vegetation variety defining the ecoregions in this area.

The history of the formation of the Cascade Mountains dates back millions of years ago to the late Eocene Epoch. With the North American Plate overriding the Pacific Plate, episodes of volcanic igneous activity persisted. In addition, small fragments of the oceanic and continental lithosphere called terranes created the North Cascades about 50 million years ago.

During the Pleistocene period dating back over two million years ago, glaciation advancing and retreating repeatedly scoured the landscape leaving deposits of rock debris. The U-shaped cross section of the river valleys is a result of recent glaciation. Uplift and faulting in combination with glaciation have been the dominant processes which have created the tall peaks and deep valleys of the North Cascades area.

== Gallery ==
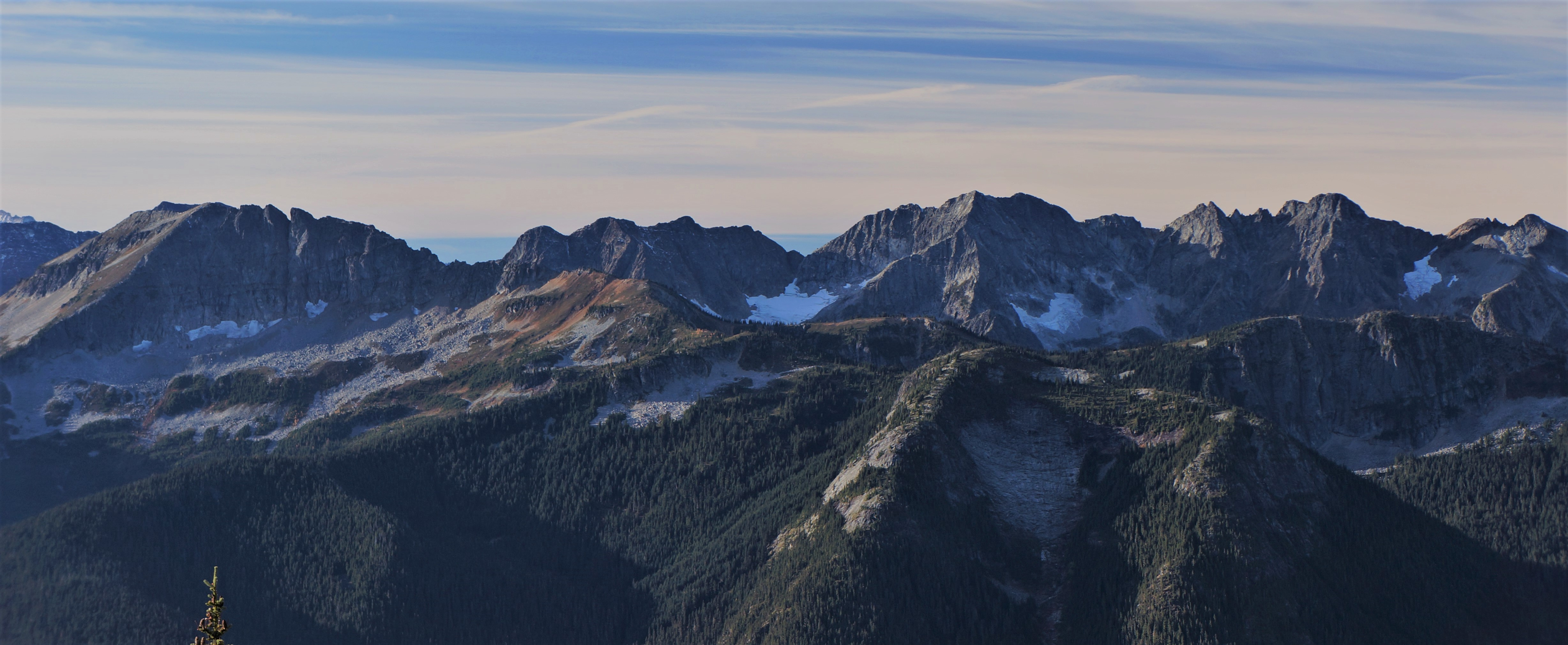
Beebe Mountain (left) and Elija Ridge

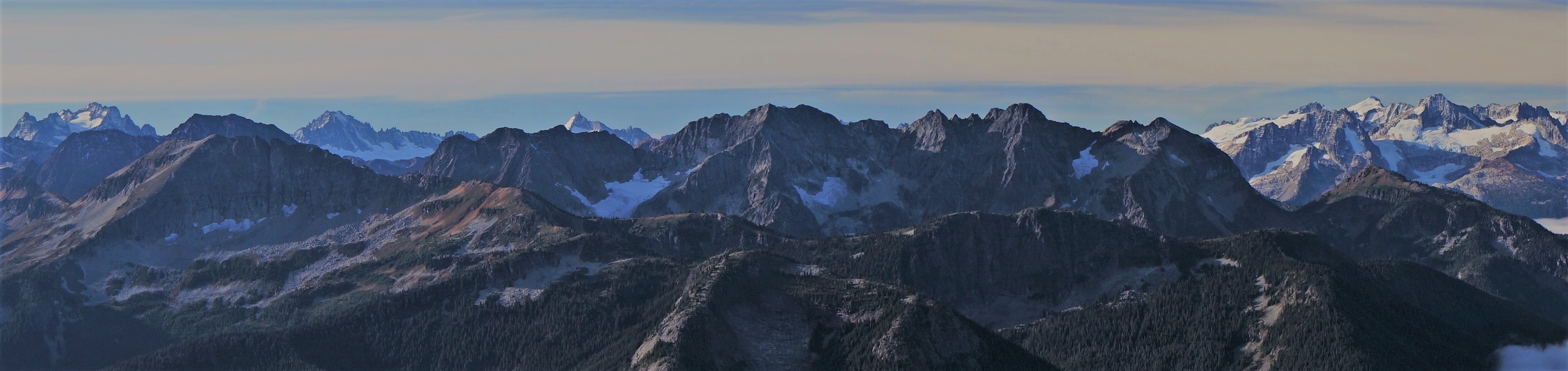
Elija Ridge (centered) north aspect, seen from Crater Mountain

== See also ==
- Geography of the North Cascades
- Geology of the Pacific Northwest
