= Little Jack (disambiguation) =

Little Jack is a mountain in Washington state.

Little Jack may also refer to:

- Little Jack Horner, a children's nursery rhyme
- Little Jack Sheppard, a burlesque play
- Little Jack, an airship in the video game Skies of Arcadia
