= Little Jack =

Mountain in Washington (state), United States

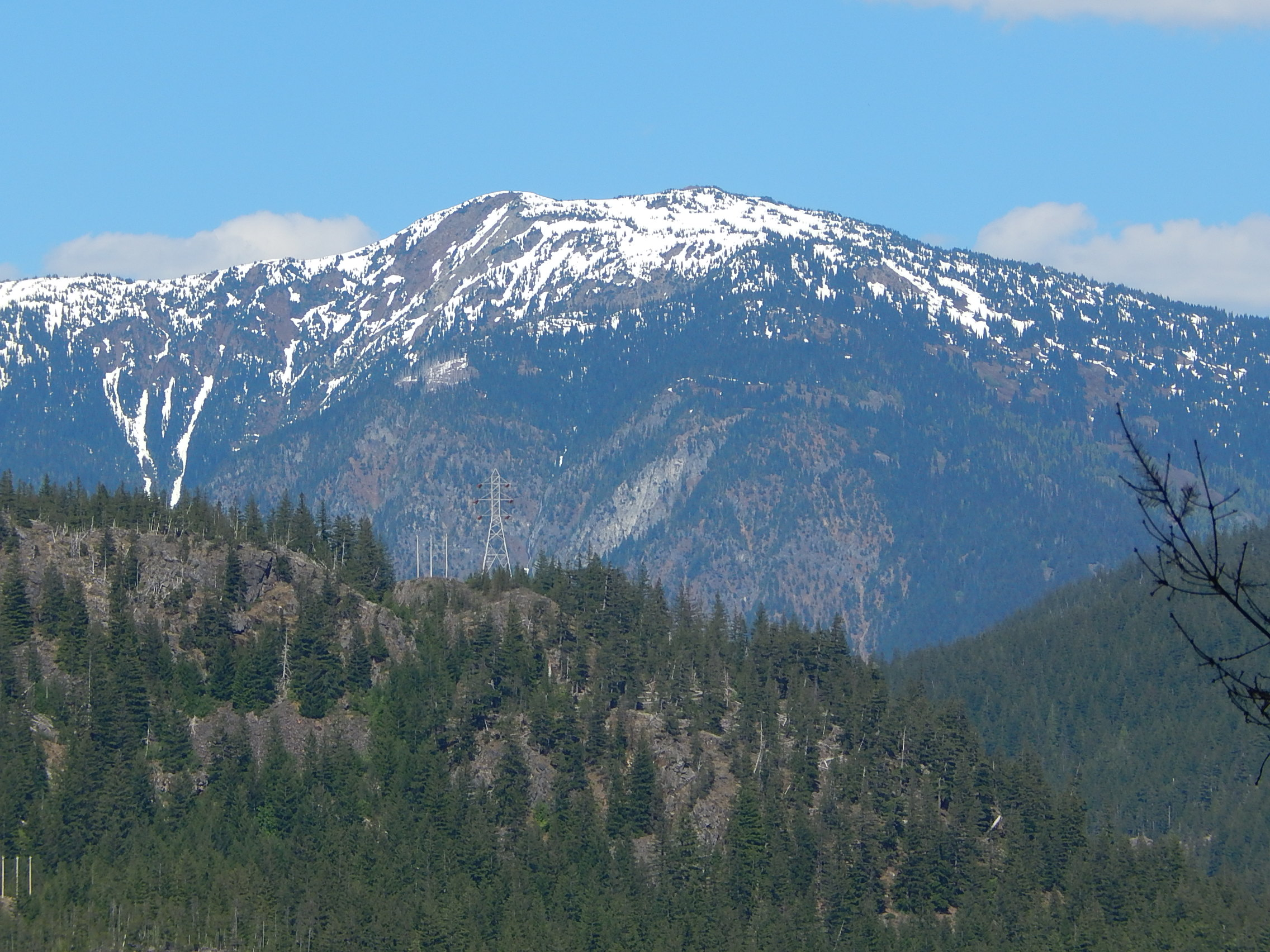
- Little Jack seen from the west on North Cascades Highway

Highest point
- Elevation: 6,745 ft (2,056 m)
- Prominence: 625 ft (191 m)
- Parent peak: Jack Mountain (9,066 ft)
- Isolation: 2.24 mi (3.60 km)
- Coordinates: 48°44′38″N 120°58′43″W

Geography
- Location within Washington (state) Location within the United States
- Interactive map of Little Jack
- Country: United States
- State: Washington
- County: Whatcom
- Protected area: Pasayten Wilderness
- Parent range: North Cascades
- Topo map: USGS Crater Mountain

Climbing
- Easiest route: Hiking trail

Little Jack is a 6,745-foot-elevation (2,056-meter) mountain summit in the North Cascades of Washington, United States. It is located within the Pasayten Wilderness. It is situated one mile south of its namesake Jack Mountain, west of Crater Mountain, and east of Ross Lake. Like many North Cascade peaks, Little Jack is more notable for its large, steep rise above local terrain than for its absolute elevation. In the early 1900s, the Forest Service built the Little Jack Trail for the purpose of grazing pack animals on the meadows of Little Jack Mountain. The name "Jack" refers to Jack Rowley, a gold prospector in the area during the late 1800s, who was credited with finding gold at Ruby Creek.

== Climate ==
Little Jack is located in the marine west coast climate zone of western North America. Weather fronts originating in the Pacific Ocean travel east toward the Cascade Mountains. As fronts approach the North Cascades, they are forced upward by the peaks of the Cascade Range (orographic lift), causing them to drop their moisture in the form of rain or snow onto the Cascades. As a result, the west side of the North Cascades experiences high precipitation, especially during the winter months in the form of snowfall. Because of maritime influence, snow tends to be wet and heavy, resulting in high avalanche danger. During winter months, weather is usually cloudy, but due to high pressure systems over the Pacific Ocean that intensify during summer months, there is often little or no cloud cover during the summer. Precipitation runoff from the mountain drains into the Skagit River.

== Geology ==
The North Cascades features some of the most rugged topography in the Cascade Range with craggy peaks, ridges, and deep glacial valleys. The history of the formation of the Cascade Mountains dates back millions of years ago to the late Eocene Epoch. With the North American Plate overriding the Pacific Plate, episodes of volcanic igneous activity persisted. In addition, small fragments of the oceanic and continental lithosphere called terranes created the North Cascades about 50 million years ago. Little Jack Mountain is part of the Little Jack terrane. Outcrops of granite and fine-grained mica schist can be found on the top of Little Jack Mountain. During the Pleistocene period dating back over two million years ago, glaciation advancing and retreating repeatedly scoured the landscape leaving deposits of rock debris. The U-shaped cross section of the river valleys is a result of recent glaciation. Uplift and faulting in combination with glaciation have been the dominant processes which have created the tall peaks and deep valleys of the North Cascades area.

== Gallery ==
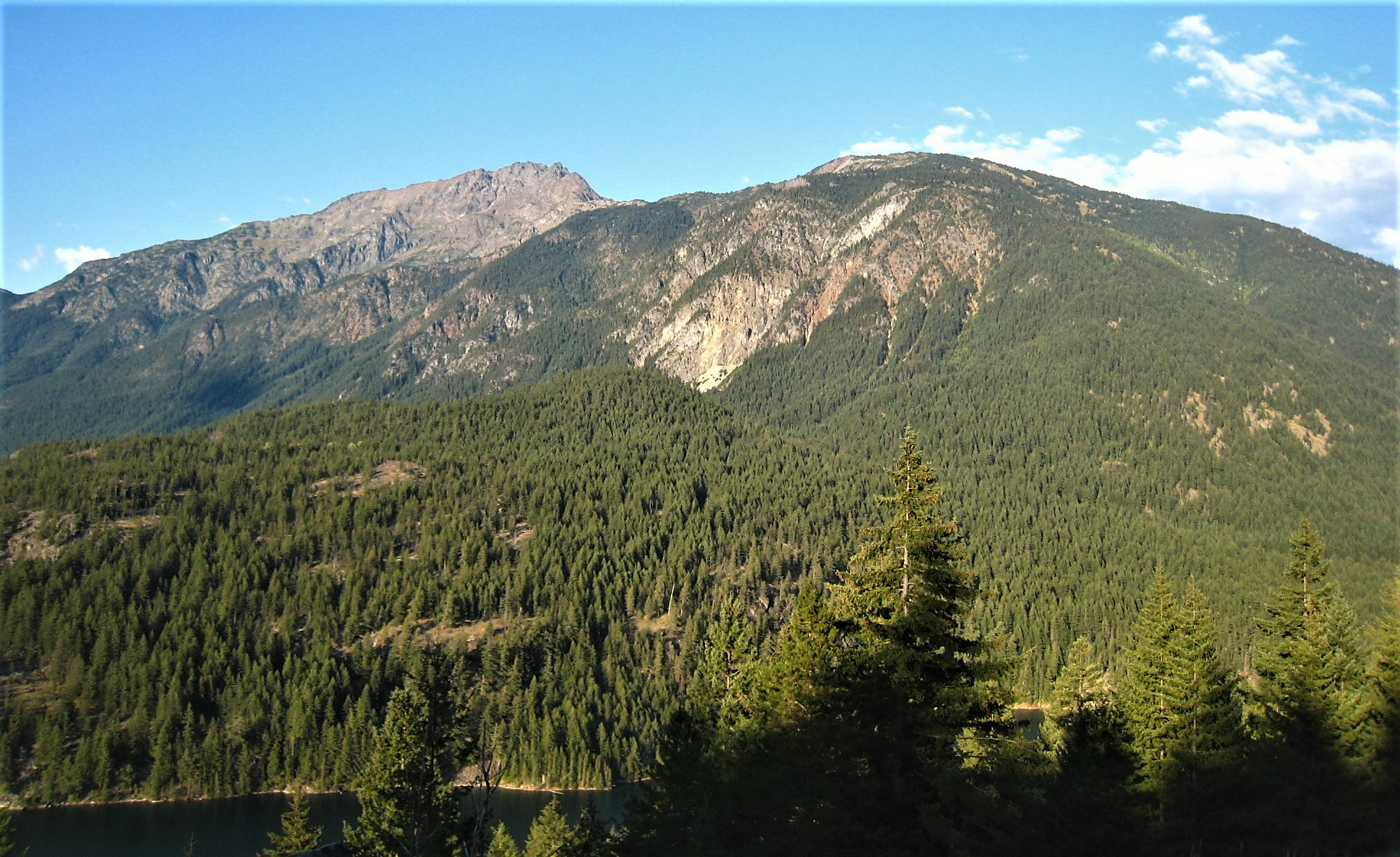
Jack Mountain (left), Little Jack (right)

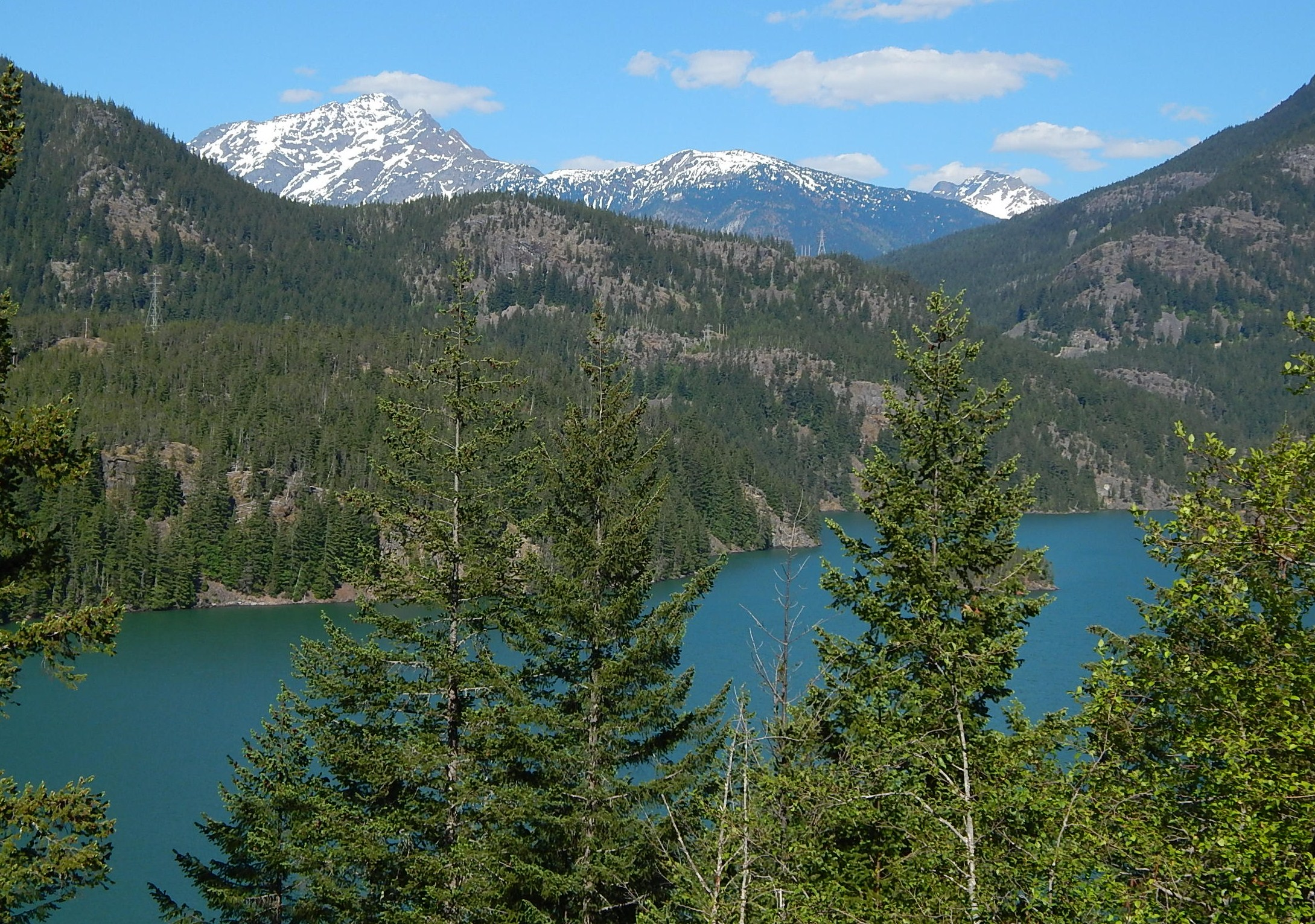
Jack Mountain, Little Jack, and Crater Mountain with Diablo Lake

== See also ==
- Geography of the North Cascades
