= Beebe Mountain =

Mountain in Washington (state), United States

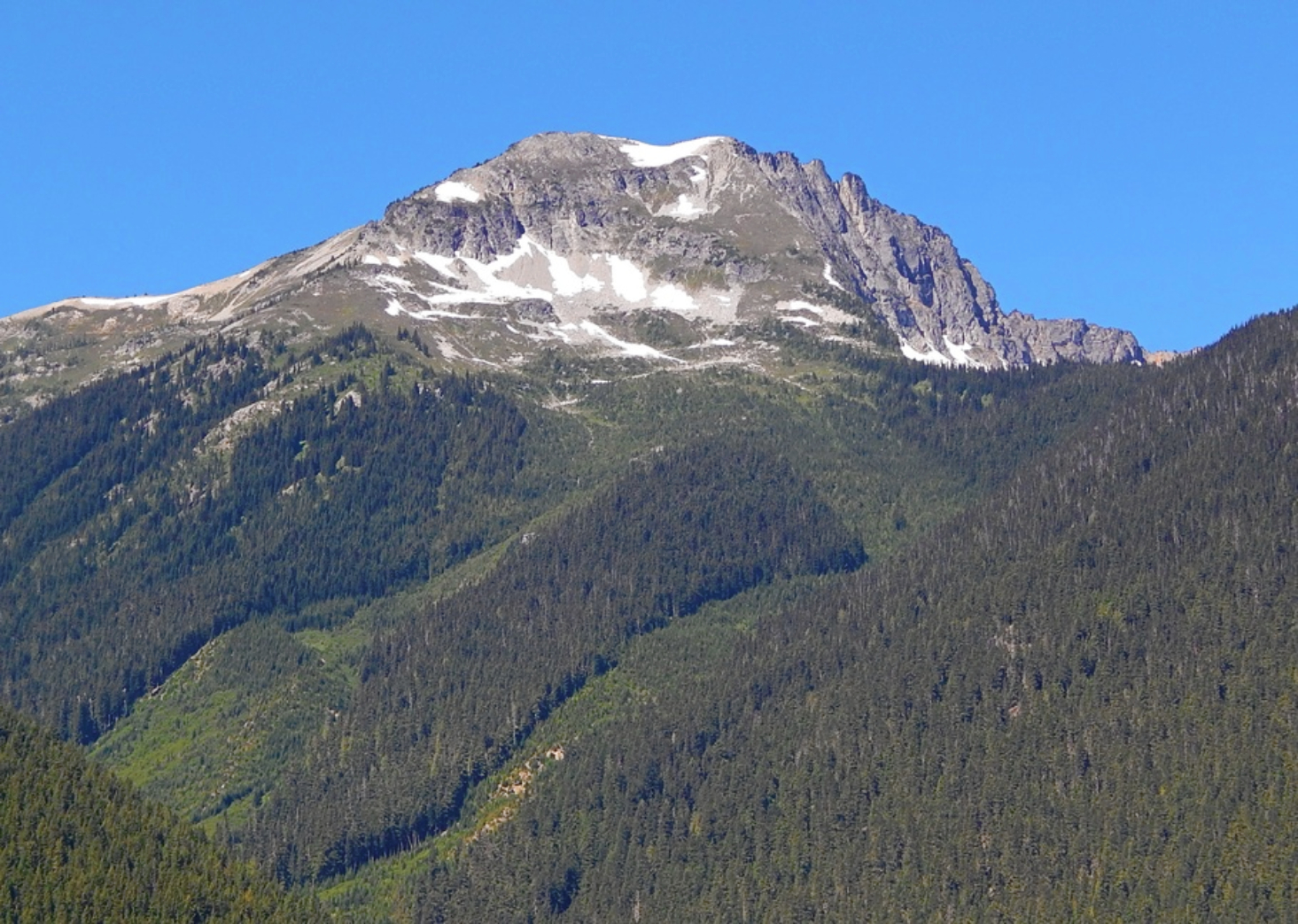
- Beebe Mountain seen from the east

Highest point
- Elevation: 7,416 ft (2,260 m)
- Prominence: 1,056 ft (320 m)
- Parent peak: Elija Ridge (7,739 ft)
- Isolation: 1.56 mi (2.51 km)
- Coordinates: 48°39′47″N 120°55′27″W

Geography
- Location within Washington (state) Location within the United States
- Interactive map of Beebe Mountain
- Location: Whatcom County, Washington; United States
- Parent range: North Cascades
- Topo map: USGS Crater Mountain

Geology
- Rock age: Eocene
- Rock type: Intrusive rock

Climbing
- Easiest route: Scrambling

Beebe Mountain is a 7,416-foot (2,260-metre) mountain summit located in the Cascade Range in the U.S. state of Washington. It is situated on the border of North Cascades National Park. Its nearest higher neighbor is Elija Ridge, 1.86 miles (2.99 km) to the southwest, and McKay Ridge is set 4 miles (6.4 km) to the northeast on the opposite side of the North Cascades Highway. The mountain's name honors Frank Beebe who worked for the Forest Service and maintained a cabin near the base of the mountain in the 1920s. Precipitation runoff on the mountain drains into Ross Lake via Granite Creek and Panther Creek.

== Climate ==
Beebe Mountain is located in the marine west coast climate zone of western North America. Most weather fronts originate in the Pacific Ocean, and travel northeast toward the Cascade Mountains. As fronts approach the North Cascades, they are forced upward by the peaks of the Cascade Range (Orographic lift), causing them to drop their moisture in the form of rain or snowfall onto the Cascades. As a result, the west side of the North Cascades experiences high precipitation, especially during the winter months in the form of snowfall. During winter months, weather is usually cloudy, but, due to high pressure systems over the Pacific Ocean that intensify during summer months, there is often little or no cloud cover during the summer. Because of maritime influence, snow tends to be wet and heavy, resulting in high avalanche danger. The months July through September offer the most favorable weather for viewing or climbing this peak.

== Geology ==
The North Cascades features some of the most rugged topography in the Cascade Range with craggy peaks, ridges, and deep glacial valleys. Geological events occurring many years ago created the diverse topography and drastic elevation changes over the Cascade Range leading to the various climate differences. These climate differences lead to vegetation variety defining the ecoregions in this area. The history of the formation of the Cascade Mountains dates back millions of years ago to the late Eocene Epoch. With the North American Plate overriding the Pacific Plate, episodes of volcanic igneous activity persisted. In addition, small fragments of the oceanic and continental lithosphere called terranes created the North Cascades about 50 million years ago.

During the Pleistocene period dating back over two million years ago, glaciation advancing and retreating repeatedly scoured the landscape leaving deposits of rock debris. The U-shaped cross section of the river valleys is a result of recent glaciation. Uplift and faulting in combination with glaciation have been the dominant processes which have created the tall peaks and deep valleys of the North Cascades area.

== Gallery ==
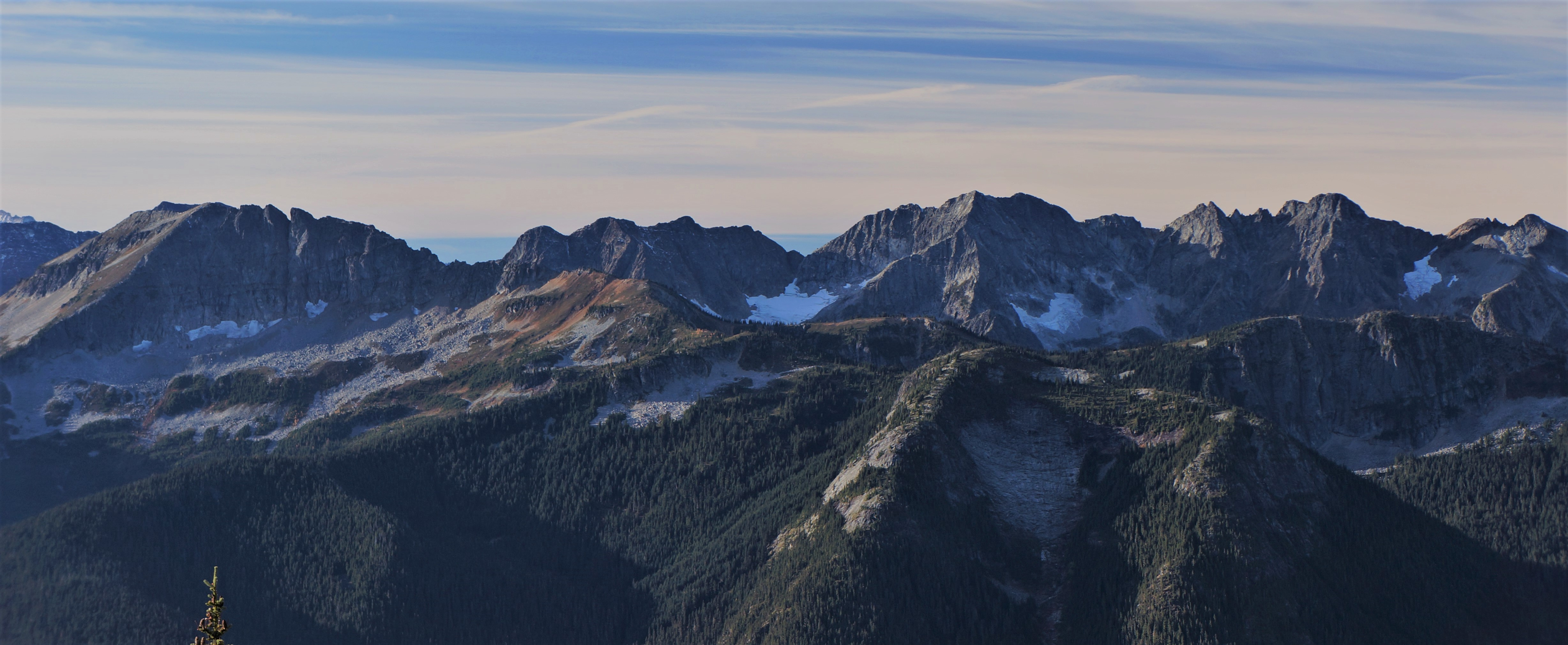
Beebe Mountain (left) and Elija Ridge seen from the north at Crater Mountain
