= Ross Lake National Recreation Area =

Recreation area in Washington, United States

- IUCN category V (protected landscape/seascape)
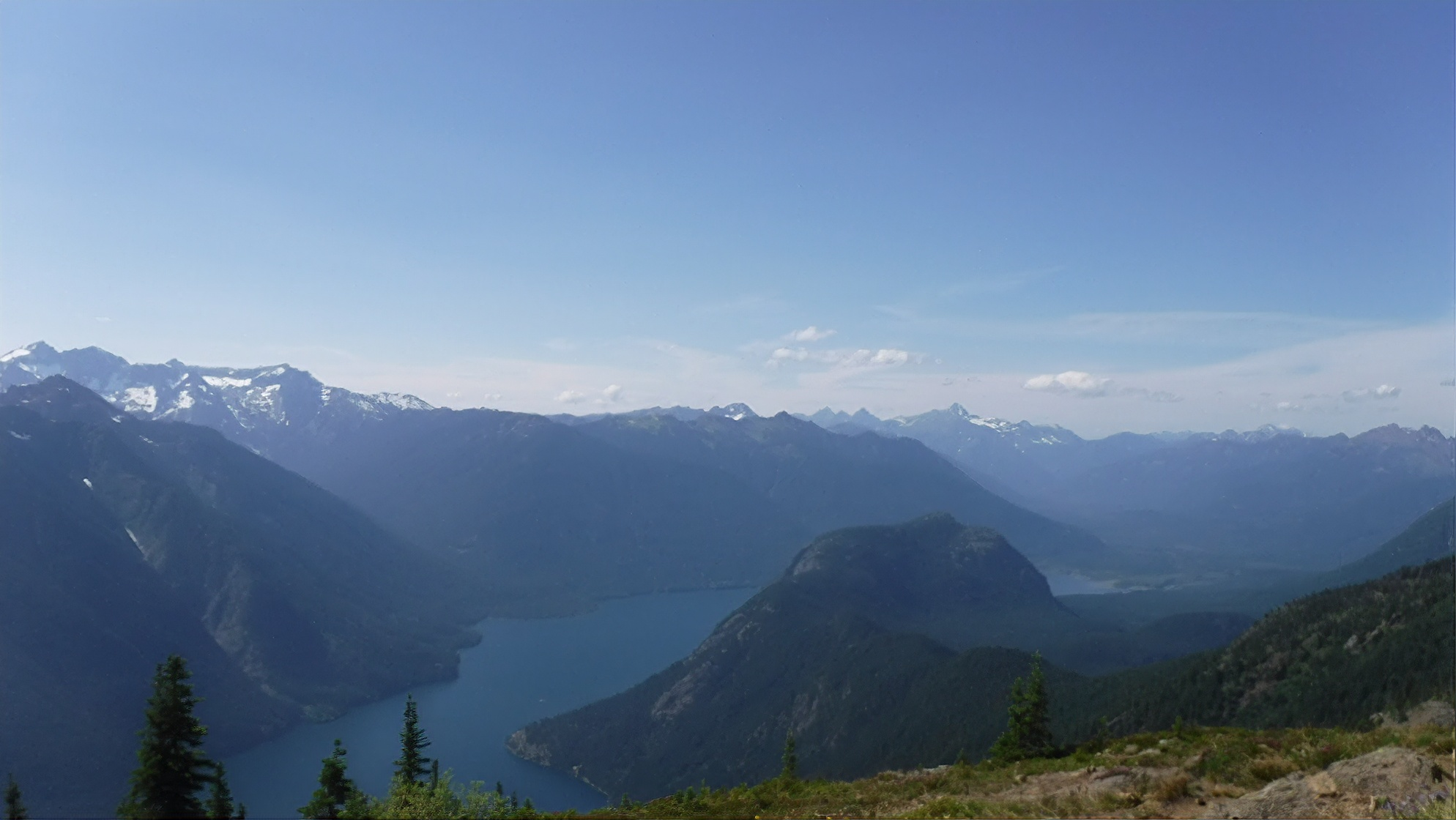
- Ross Lake from Desolation Peak in 2017

- Location within Washington (state) Location within the United States
- Interactive map of Ross Lake National Recreation Area
- Location: Whatcom County and Skagit County, Washington, United States
- Nearest city: Newhalem, Washington
- Coordinates: 48°40′23″N 121°14′43″W
- Area: 117,575 acres (475.81 km^{2})
- Established: October 2, 1968
- Visitors: 998,019 (in 2022)
- Governing body: National Park Service
- Website: North Cascades National Park

Ross Lake National Recreation Area is a US national recreation area in north central Washington just south of the Canada–US border. It is the most accessible part of the North Cascades National Park Complex which also includes North Cascades National Park and Lake Chelan National Recreation Area. Ross Lake NRA follows the Skagit River corridor from the Canada–US border to the western foothills of the Cascades. The NRA contains a portion of scenic Washington State Route 20, the North Cascades Highway, and includes three reservoirs: 12,000-acre (4,900 ha) Ross Lake, 910-acre (370 ha) Diablo Lake, and 210-acre (85 ha) Gorge Lake. These reservoirs make up the Skagit River Hydroelectric Project operated by Seattle City Light. Nestled in the "American Alps" the Ross Lake NRA bisects the north and south units of North Cascades National Park.

Diablo Lake from Hwy 20

== Attractions ==
Ross Lake National Recreation Area is a major recreation destination in the Northern Cascades, attracting visitors from across the US and Canada with fishing, hunting, canoeing, kayaking, climbing and hiking opportunities. The NRA contains trailheads that connect to hundreds of miles of hiking trails in adjoining North Cascades National Park, Pasayten Wilderness and Skagit Valley Provincial Park. National Park Service campgrounds along the North Cascades Highway including Newhalem Creek, Colonial Creek and Goodall Creek feature tent and RV camping. Newhalem, Washington is home to both the North Cascades Visitor Center and the Skagit Information Center. Along Ross Lake and Diablo reservoirs boat-in camping is allowed, permits are required from the Wilderness Information Center in Marblemount, Washington.

Desolation Peak Lookout remains an operational fire lookout staffed each summer by fire personnel. The lookout features sweeping vistas of North Cascade peaks including Hozomeen Mountain. The lookout is best known as the setting for Jack Kerouac's novel Desolation Angels. Kerouac spent the summer of 1956 manning the 14-by-14-foot (4.3 by 4.3 m) structure for the U.S. Forest Service. The lookout can be accessed via a six-mile (10 km) trail from the shore of Ross Lake.

== Access ==
Ross Lake NRA provides the primary access points for motorists and backpackers entering the North Cascades National Park Service Complex. Public automobile access is allowed via two roads. Most travelers in the region use the North Cascades Highway, which bisects the National Recreation Area east to west. The second vehicle access point is the southern terminus of the 43-mile (69 km) gravel Silver Skagit Road just south of the Canada–US border at the Hozomeen campground. The nearest large town on the west side of the park is Sedro-Woolley, Washington, while Winthrop lies to the east and Hope, British Columbia to the north. The entrance to the complex lies 50 miles (80 km) east of Interstate 5. No entrance fee is charged for North Cascades National Park, Ross Lake National Recreation Area, or Lake Chelan National Recreation Area.

== See also ==
- Ecology of the North Cascades
