= Nohokomeen Glacier =

Glacier in the state of Washington

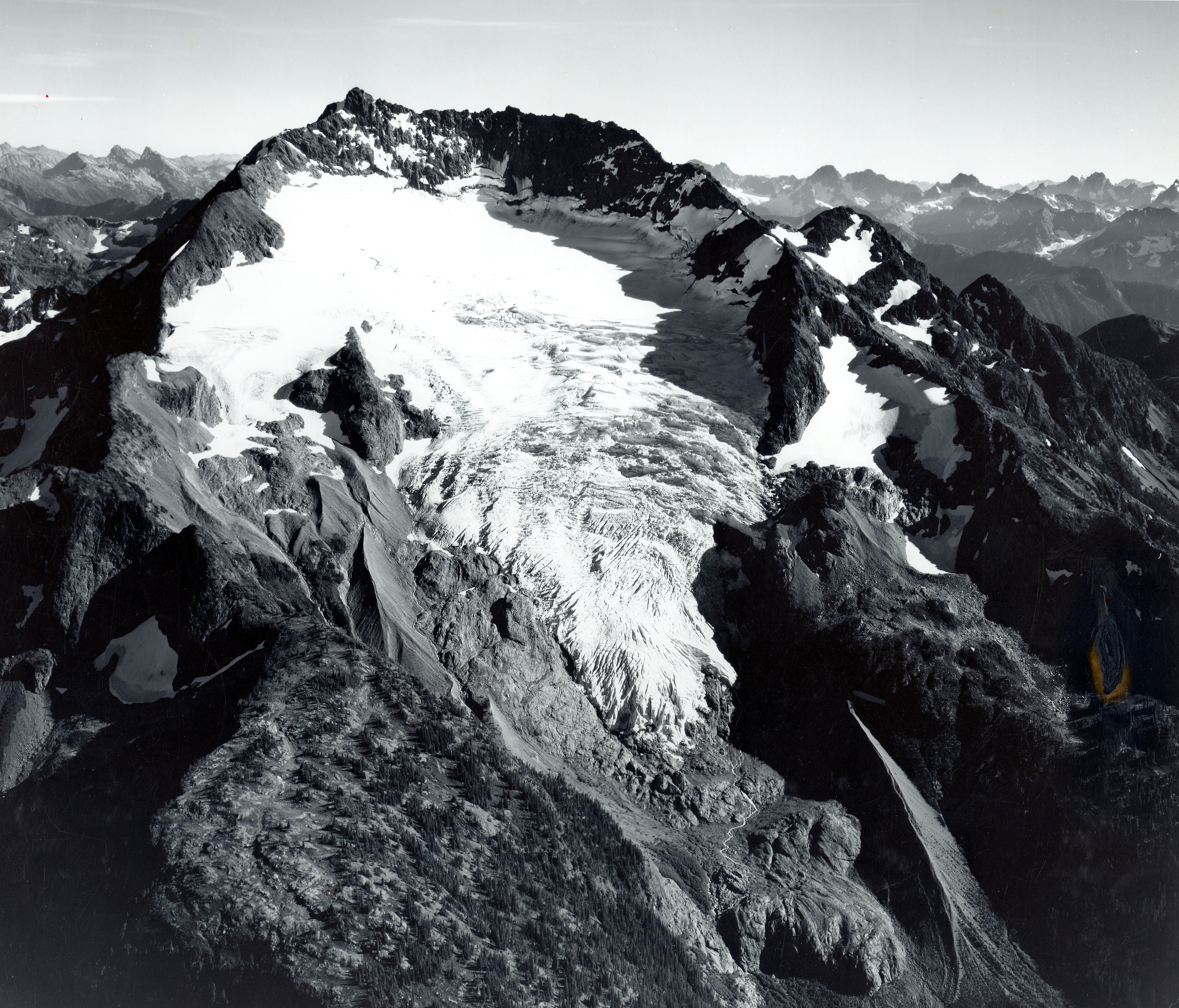
- Nohokomeen Glacier below Jack Mountain as imaged in 1966

- Location within Washington (state)
- Type: Mountain glacier
- Location: Whatcom County, Washington, U.S.
- Coordinates: 48°46′47″N 120°58′05″W
- Area: over 340 acres
- Length: 1.10 mi (1.77 km)
- Terminus: Barren rock/icefall
- Status: Retreating

Nohokomeen Glacier is in North Cascades National Park in the U.S. state of Washington, in a cirque on the north slope of Jack Mountain. Nohokomeen Glacier is heavily crevassed, especially after the midpoint of its descent from 8,200 to 6,100 ft (2,500 to 1,900 m). In the last 20 years the retreating glacier has exposed a new small lake at 6260 feet. Overall the glacier is retreating at a slower than average rate less of than 100 yards over the last seventeen years, and less than 900 feet in the last 46 years. This is mostly likely caused by the high attitude of the glacier; many of the glaciers in the Cascades are lower in elevation by up to a thousand vertical feet.

== See also ==
- List of glaciers in the United States
