= Skagit Valley Provincial Park =

Canadian provincial park

- IUCN category II (national park)
- Location within British Columbia Location within Fraser Valley Regional District
- Interactive map of Skagit Valley Provincial Park
- Location: Fraser Valley RD, British Columbia, Canada
- Coordinates: 49°07′00″N 121°10′00″W
- Area: 27,964 ha (107.97 sq mi)
- Established: December 6, 1973
- Governing body: BC Parks

Skagit Valley Provincial Park is a provincial park in British Columbia, Canada, centred on the Skagit River and its tributaries. The park is 27,964 Hectares. The park borders E. C. Manning Provincial Park in Canada and Ross Lake National Recreation Area and North Cascades National Park in the United States. It includes part of Ross Lake, a reservoir formed by a hydroelectric dam in Whatcom County, Washington.

== See also ==
- Chilliwack Lake Provincial Park
