= Jerry Glacier =

Glacier in Washington, United States

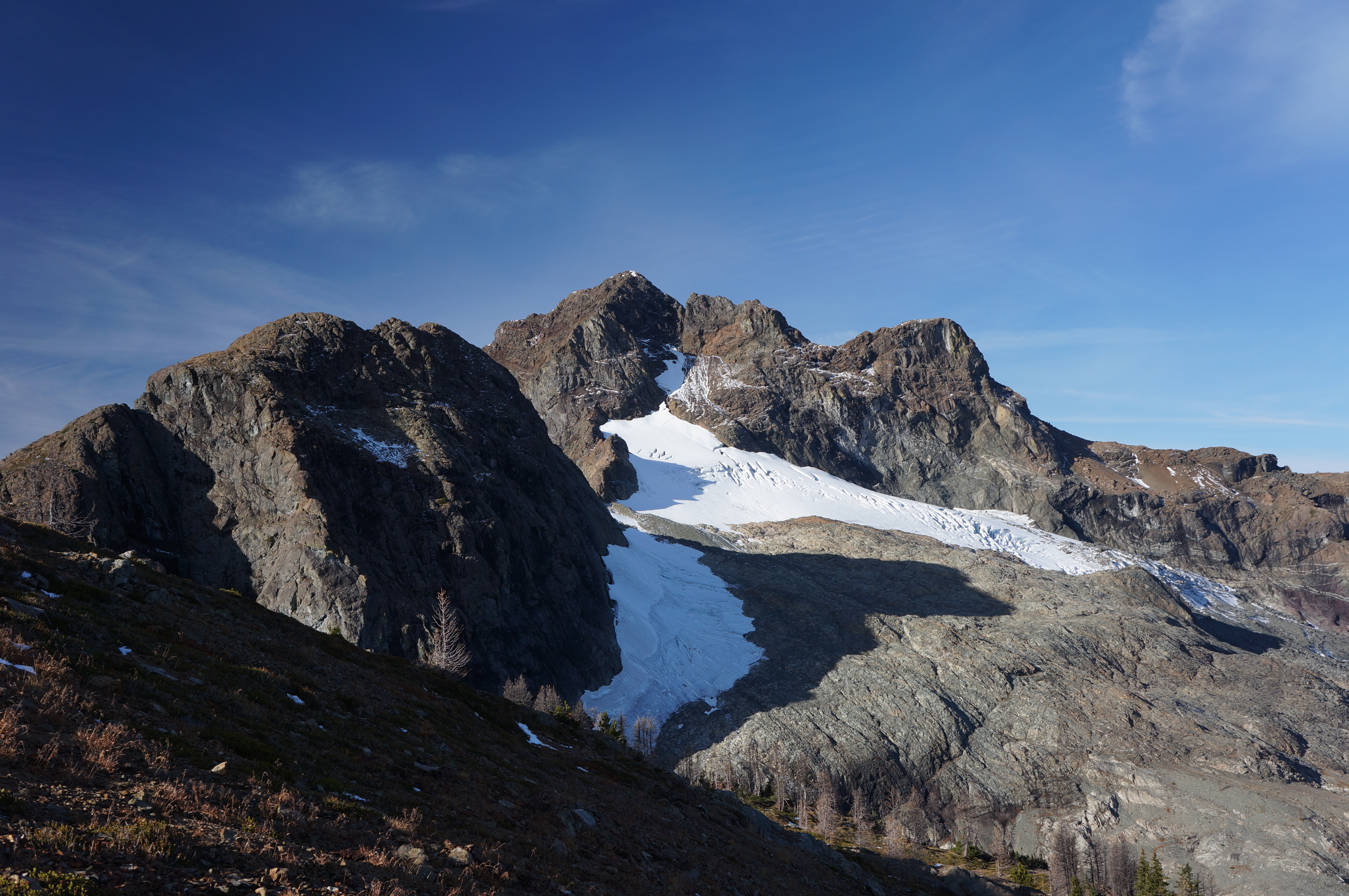
- Jerry Glacier on Crater Mountain

- Location within Washington (state)
- Type: Mountain glacier
- Location: Whatcom County, Washington, U.S.
- Coordinates: 48°44′36″N 120°54′58″W
- Length: .20 mi (0.32 km)
- Terminus: Barren rock/icefall
- Status: Retreating

Jerry Glacier is in Wenatchee National Forest in the U.S. state of Washington, on the north slope of Crater Mountain. Descending from 7,400 to 6,900 ft (2,300 to 2,100 m), Jerry Glacier has retreated, leaving a proglacial lake at its eastern flank.

== See also ==
- List of glaciers in the United States
