= Mount Prophet =

Mountain in Washington (state), United States

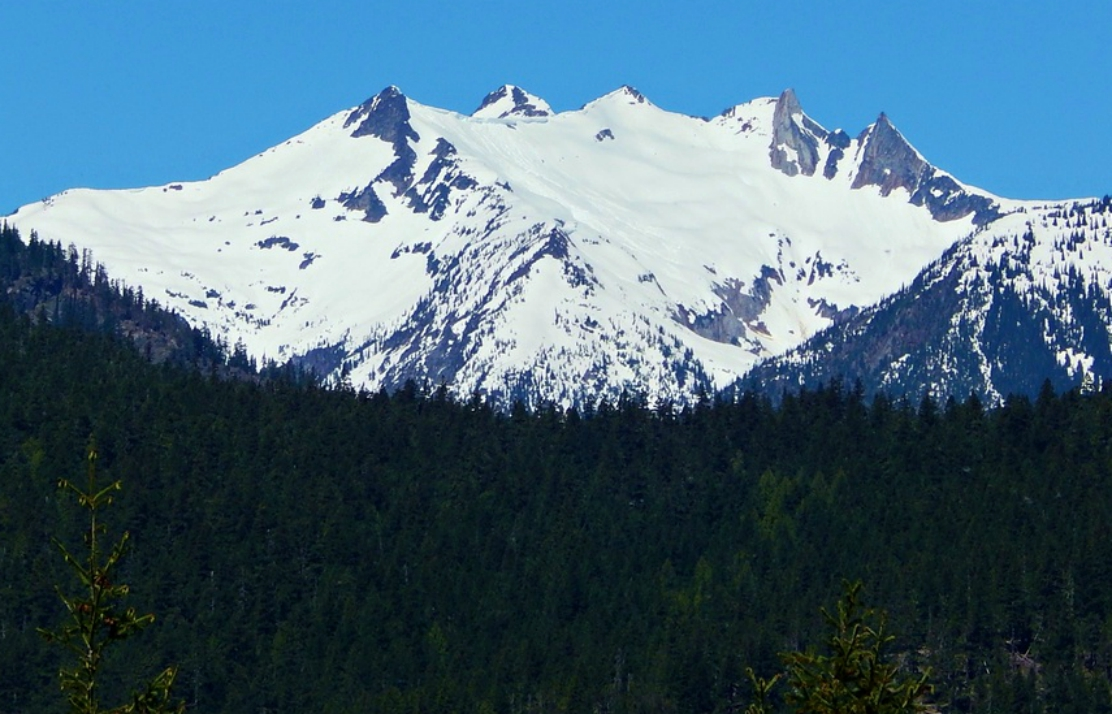
- Southeast aspect

Highest point
- Elevation: 7,640+ ft (2,330+ m)
- Prominence: 4,000 ft (1,220 m)
- Coordinates: 48°50′55″N 121°09′45″W

Geography
- Location within Washington (state)
- Location: North Cascades National Park, Whatcom County, Washington, U.S.
- Parent range: North Cascades
- Topo map: USGS Mount Prophet

Climbing
- First ascent: September 1975 by Dan Sjolseth and partner
- Easiest route: Basic Snow/Ice Climb

Mount Prophet is a steep and remote mountain in the North Cascades of Washington state. Located between several isolated valleys west of Ross Lake and east of the Picket Range, the mountain was named in reference to Tommy Rowland, a "religiously fanatic" prospector who lived by the Skagit River in the late 19th century. Because of its difficult-to-access location, few people have attempted to climb Mount Prophet.

Ringed by the separate valleys of the two Beaver Creeks and Arctic Creek, the mountain rises steeply from the valley floor, which gives it a prominence of over 4,000 feet (1,220 m). It is the 18th most prominent peak in Washington state. Several trails lead to drainages near the mountain, the closest of which is the Little Beaver-Big Beaver Loop, a distance of roughly 26.5 miles (42.6 km).

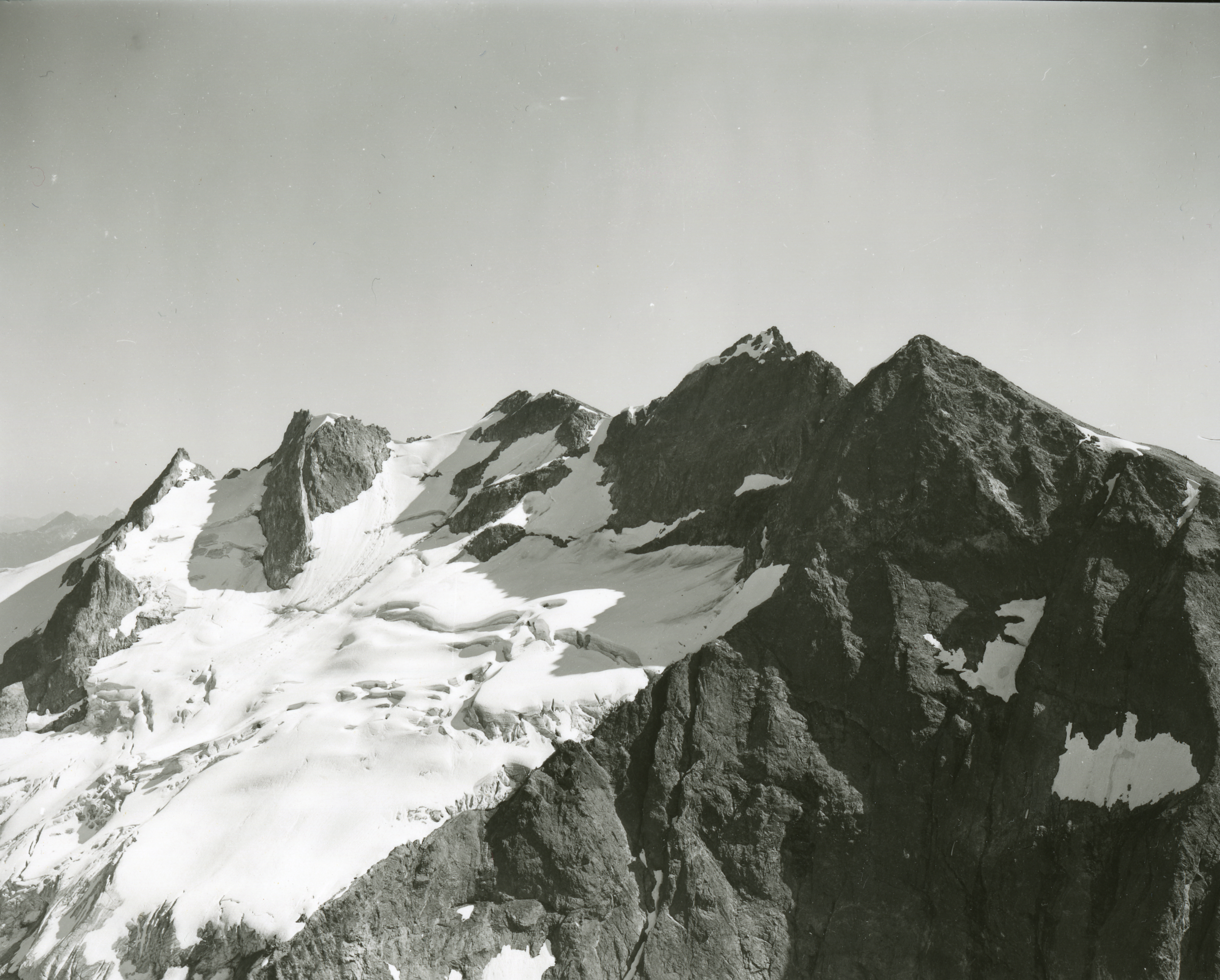
Mt. Prophet, north aspect, with Arctic Glacier

== Nearby mountains ==
- Mount Terror
- Mount Fury
- Mount Blum
- Genesis Peak
