= Genesis Peak =

Mountain in Washington (state), United States

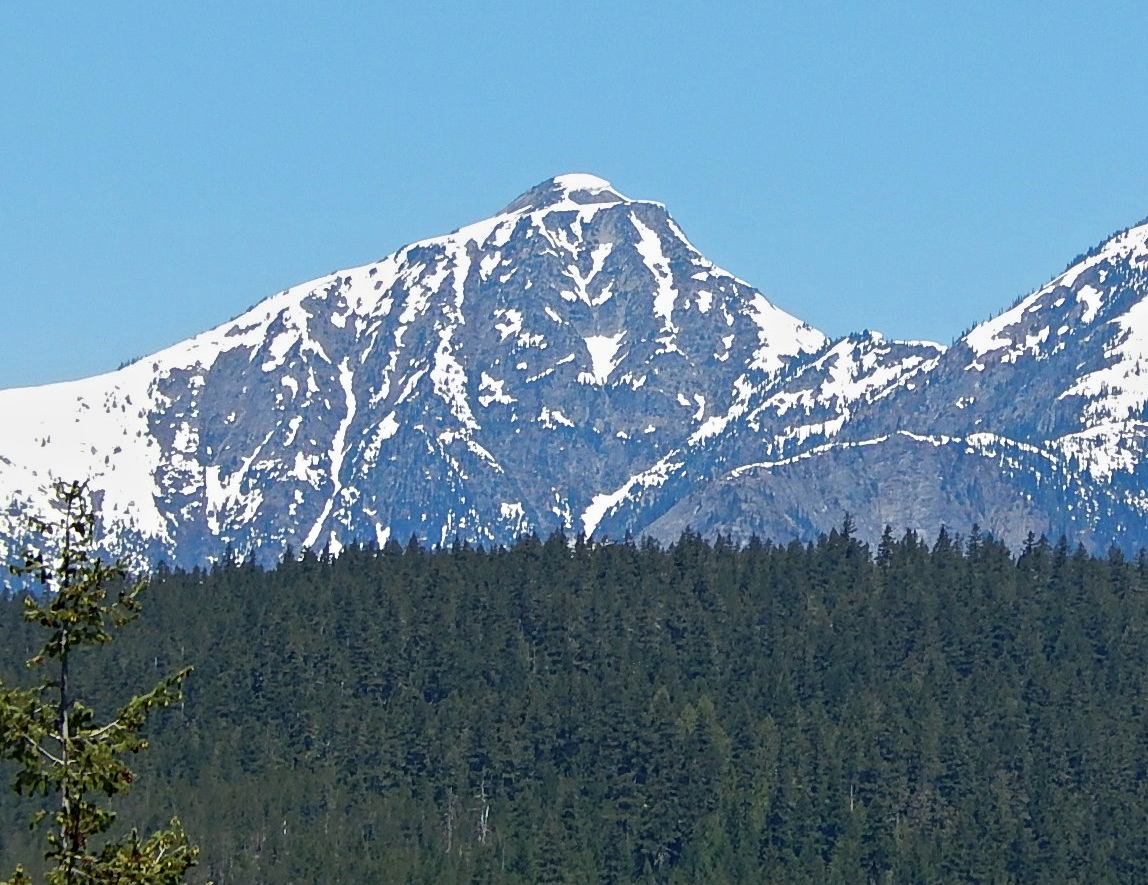
- Genesis Peak, southeast aspect

Highest point
- Elevation: 7,244 ft (2,208 m)
- Prominence: 1,084 ft (330 m)
- Parent peak: Mount Prophet (7,640 ft)
- Isolation: 2.21 mi (3.56 km)
- Coordinates: 48°50′01″N 121°07′11″W

Geography
- Location within Washington (state) Location within the United States
- Interactive map of Genesis Peak
- Country: United States
- State: Washington
- County: Whatcom
- Protected area: North Cascades National Park
- Parent range: Skagit Range; North Cascades; Cascade Range
- Topo map: USGS Pumpkin Mountain

Climbing
- First ascent: 1975

Genesis Peak is a 7,244-foot (2,208-metre) mountain summit located in the North Cascades, in Whatcom County of Washington, United States. It is situated within North Cascades National Park and Stephen Mather Wilderness. The nearest higher neighbor is Mount Prophet, 2.22 miles (3.57 km) to the northwest. Like many North Cascade peaks, Genesis Peak is more notable for its large, steep rise above local terrain than for its absolute elevation. Topographic relief is significant since the southern aspect of the mountain rises 5,400 feet above the Big Beaver Valley in approximately two miles (3.2 km), and the eastern aspect of the mountain rises 5,600 feet above Ross Lake in approximately three miles (4.8 km). Precipitation runoff from the mountain drains into Ross Lake via Skymo, No Name, and Big Beaver Creeks. The first ascent of this peak was made September 13, 1975, by Norman Burke, Cliff Lawson, Ed Lebert, and Dan Sjolseth.

== Climate ==
Genesis Peak is located in the marine west coast climate zone of western North America. Weather fronts originating in the Pacific Ocean travel east toward the Cascade Mountains. As fronts approach the North Cascades, they are forced upward by the peaks of the Cascade Range, causing them to drop their moisture in the form of rain or snow onto the Cascades. As a result, the west side of the North Cascades experiences high precipitation, especially during the winter months in the form of snowfall. Because of maritime influence, snow tends to be wet and heavy, resulting in high avalanche danger. During winter months, weather is usually cloudy, but due to high pressure systems over the Pacific Ocean that intensify during summer months, there is often little or no cloud cover during the summer. The months July through September offer the most favorable weather for viewing or climbing this peak.

== Geology ==
The North Cascades features some of the most rugged topography in the Cascade Range with craggy peaks, ridges, and deep glacial valleys. Geological events occurring many years ago created the diverse topography and drastic elevation changes over the Cascade Range leading to the various climate differences. These climate differences lead to vegetation variety defining the ecoregions in this area.

The history of the formation of the Cascade Mountains dates back millions of years ago to the late Eocene Epoch. With the North American Plate overriding the Pacific Plate, episodes of volcanic igneous activity persisted. In addition, small fragments of the oceanic and continental lithosphere called terranes created the North Cascades about 50 million years ago.

During the Pleistocene period dating back over two million years ago, glaciation advancing and retreating repeatedly scoured the landscape leaving deposits of rock debris. The U-shaped cross section of the river valleys is a result of recent glaciation. Uplift and faulting in combination with glaciation have been the dominant processes which have created the tall peaks and deep valleys of the North Cascades area.

== Gallery ==
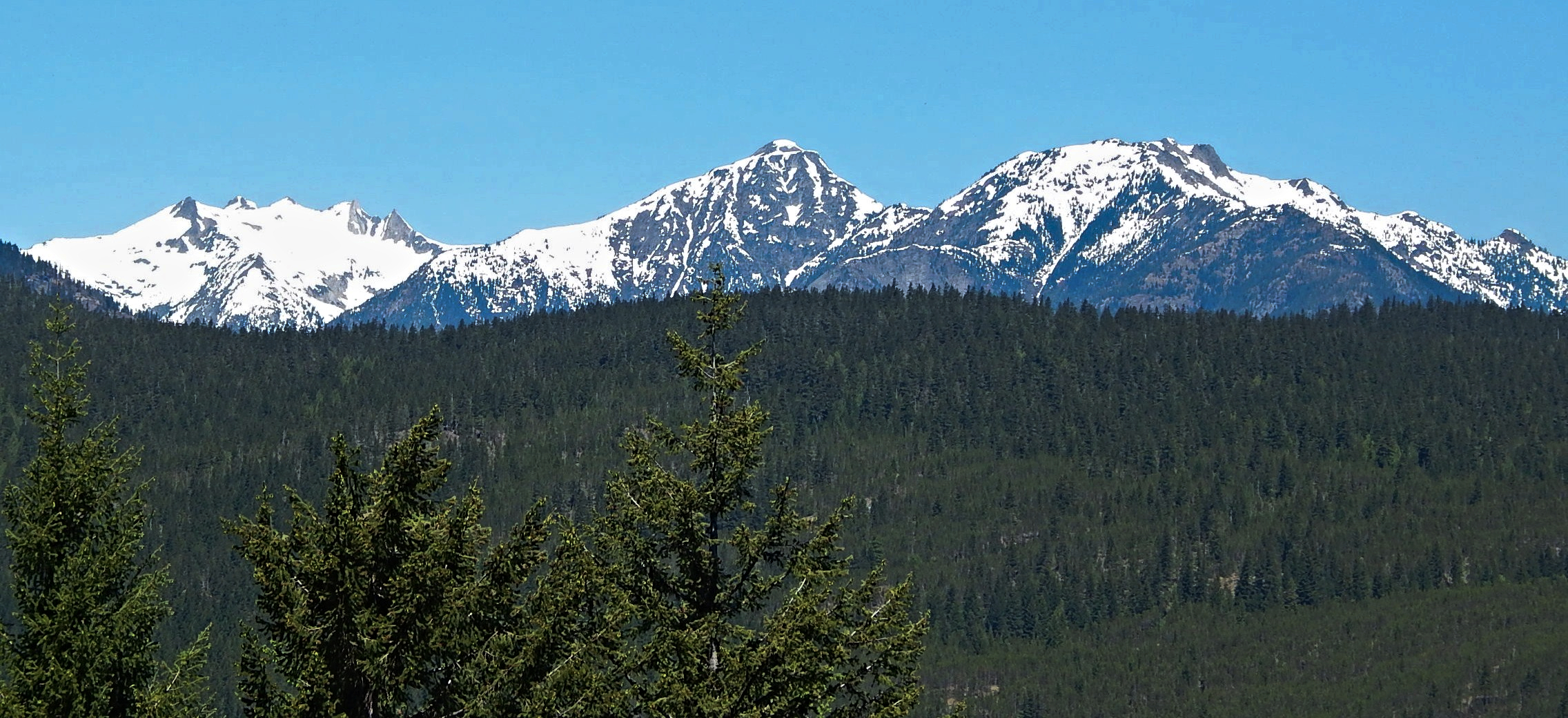
Left to right: Mt. Prophet, Genesis, and Chaos seen from North Cascades Highway

== See also ==
- Geography of the North Cascades
- List of mountain peaks of Washington (state)
