= Crater Mountain =

Mountain in Washington (state), United States

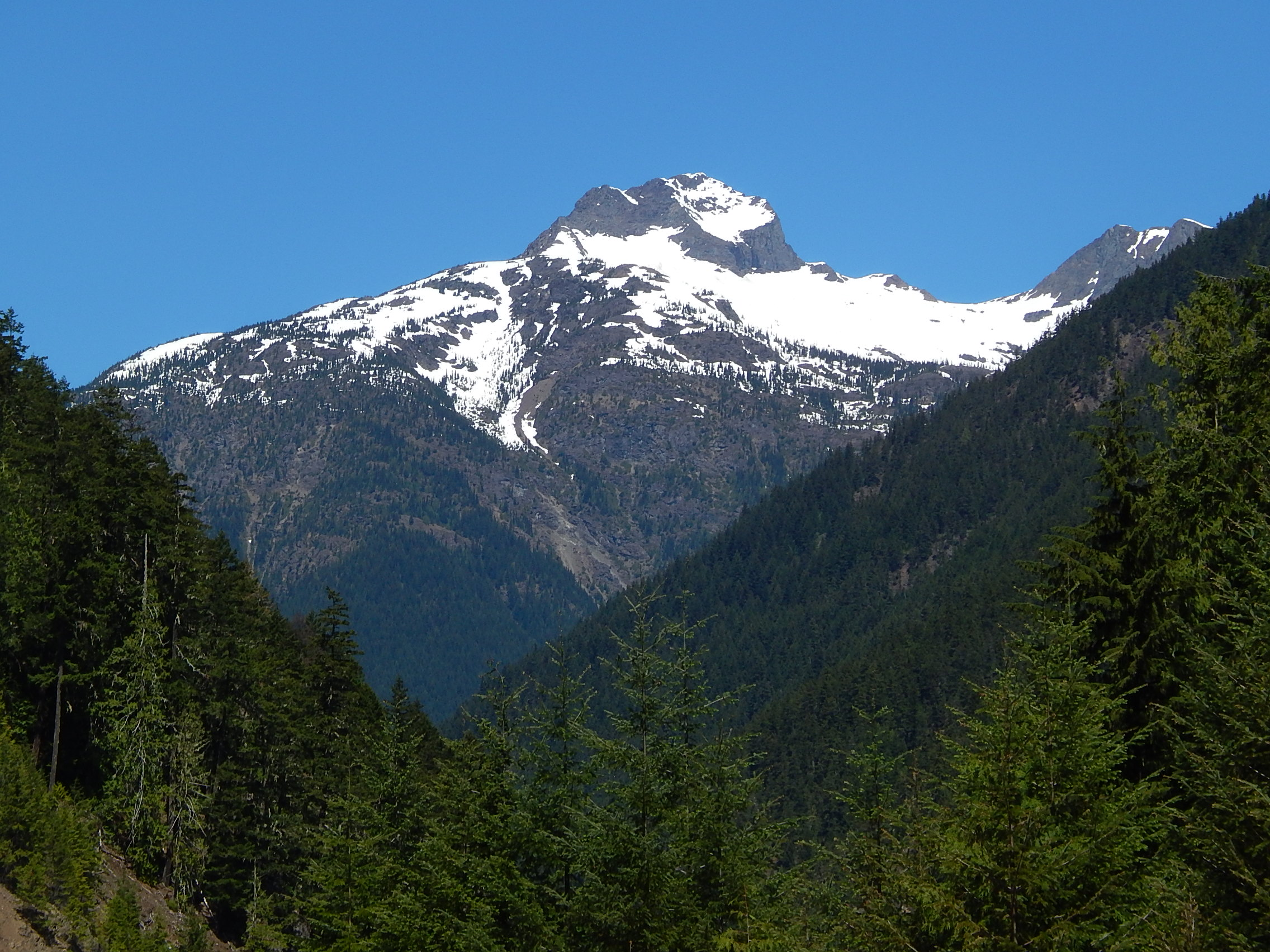
- Crater Mountain seen from North Cascades Highway

Highest point
- Elevation: 8,132 ft (2,479 m) NAVD 88
- Prominence: 1,928 ft (588 m)
- Parent peak: Jack Mountain (9,066 ft)
- Isolation: 2.86 mi (4.60 km)
- Coordinates: 48°44′21″N 120°55′13″W

Geography
- Location within Washington (state) Location within the United States
- Interactive map of Crater Mountain
- Country: United States
- State: Washington
- County: Whatcom
- Protected area: Pasayten Wilderness
- Parent range: North Cascades
- Topo map: USGS Crater Mountain

Crater Mountain is an 8,132-foot (2,479-metre) mountain summit located in the North Cascades of Washington state. It is the 29th-highest mountain in the Pasayten Wilderness. The Jerry Glacier resides in the cirque on the upper north slopes of the mountain. The crater-like summit of the mountain is not of volcanic origin. Crater Mountain is grouped in the sub-range Hozameen Range, which also includes Hozomeen Mountain and Jack Mountain.

== Geology ==
The mountain is composed mostly of metavolcanic rock and metasedimentary rock from the Hozameen Group. Most predominate is greenstone from the Jurassic to Permian periods. Crater Mountain is carved from greenstone of the Hozomeen Terrane, once the basaltic floor of the ancient Methow Ocean. The mountain's name probably derives from the craterlike shape of its summit, which was carved from the ancient metamorphosed basalt by modern cirque glaciers. The rugged battlements of the greenstone viewed from the highway rest above phyllite of the Little Jack terrane, which is exposed in the lower slopes of the mountain.

== Climate ==
Crater Mountain is located in the marine west coast climate zone of western North America. Weather fronts originating in the Pacific Ocean travel northeast toward the Cascade Mountains. As fronts approach the North Cascades, they are forced upward by the peaks of the Cascade Range, causing them to drop their moisture in the form of rain or snowfall onto the Cascades. As a result, the west side of the North Cascades experiences high precipitation, especially during the winter months in the form of snowfall. Because of maritime influence, snow tends to be wet and heavy, resulting in high avalanche danger. Due to its temperate climate and proximity to the Pacific Ocean, areas west of the Cascade Crest very rarely experience temperatures below 0 °F (−18 °C) or above 80 °F (27 °C). During winter months, weather is usually cloudy, but, due to high pressure systems over the Pacific Ocean that intensify during summer months, there is often little or no cloud cover during the summer. The months of July through September offer the most favorable weather for viewing or climbing this peak.

== Gallery ==
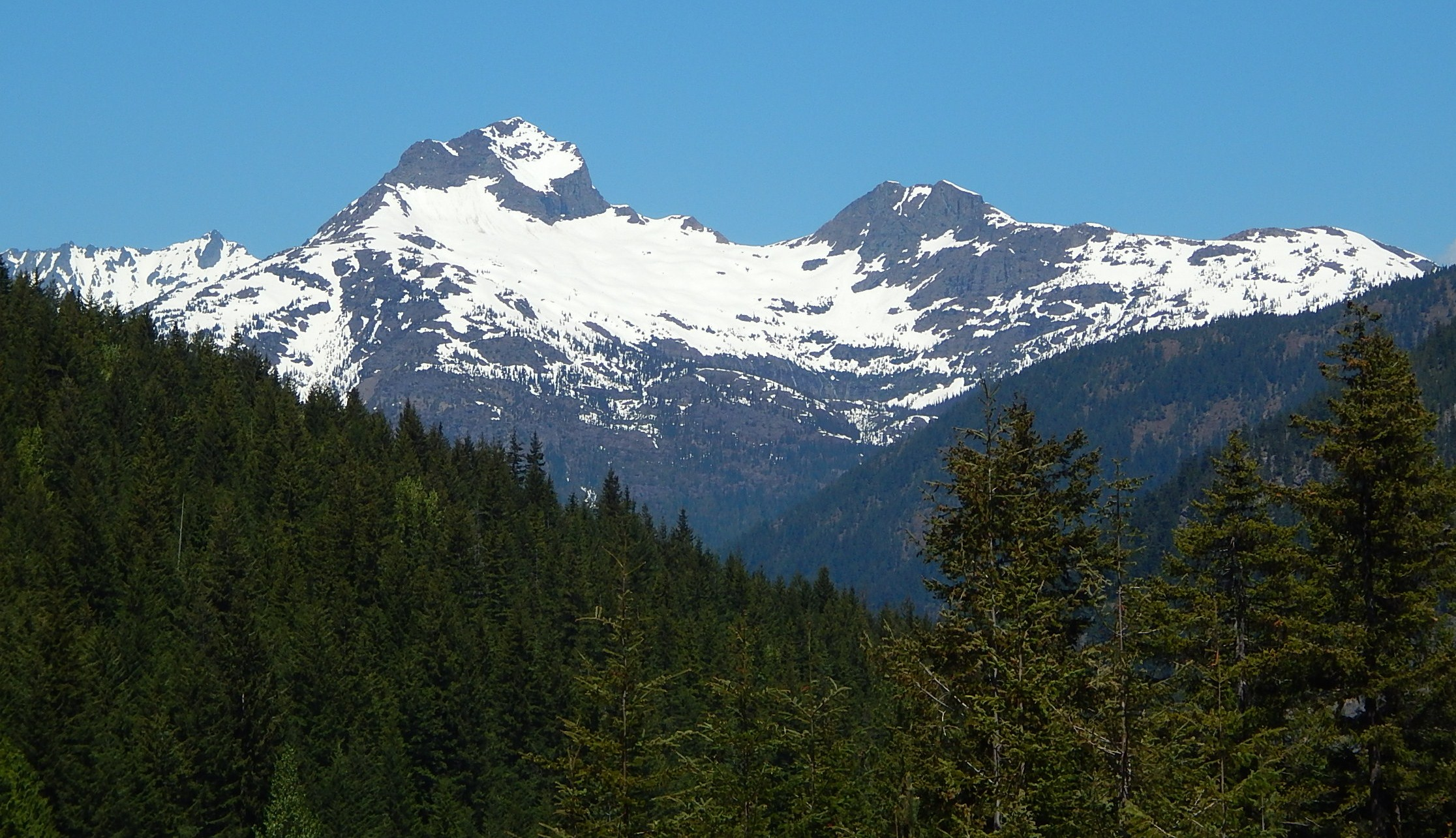
Crater Mountain seen from the North Cascades Highway

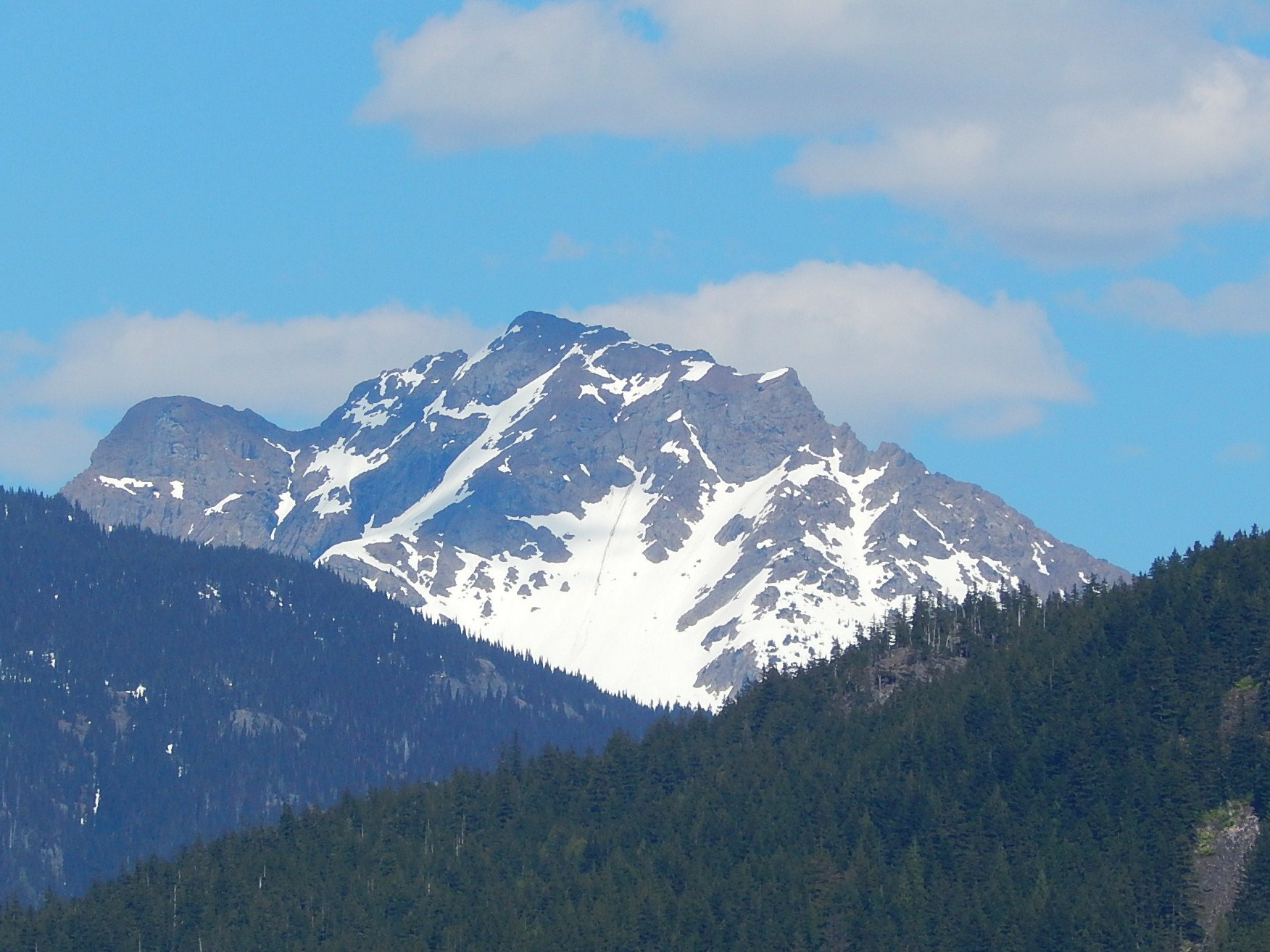
Crater Mountain seen from the west

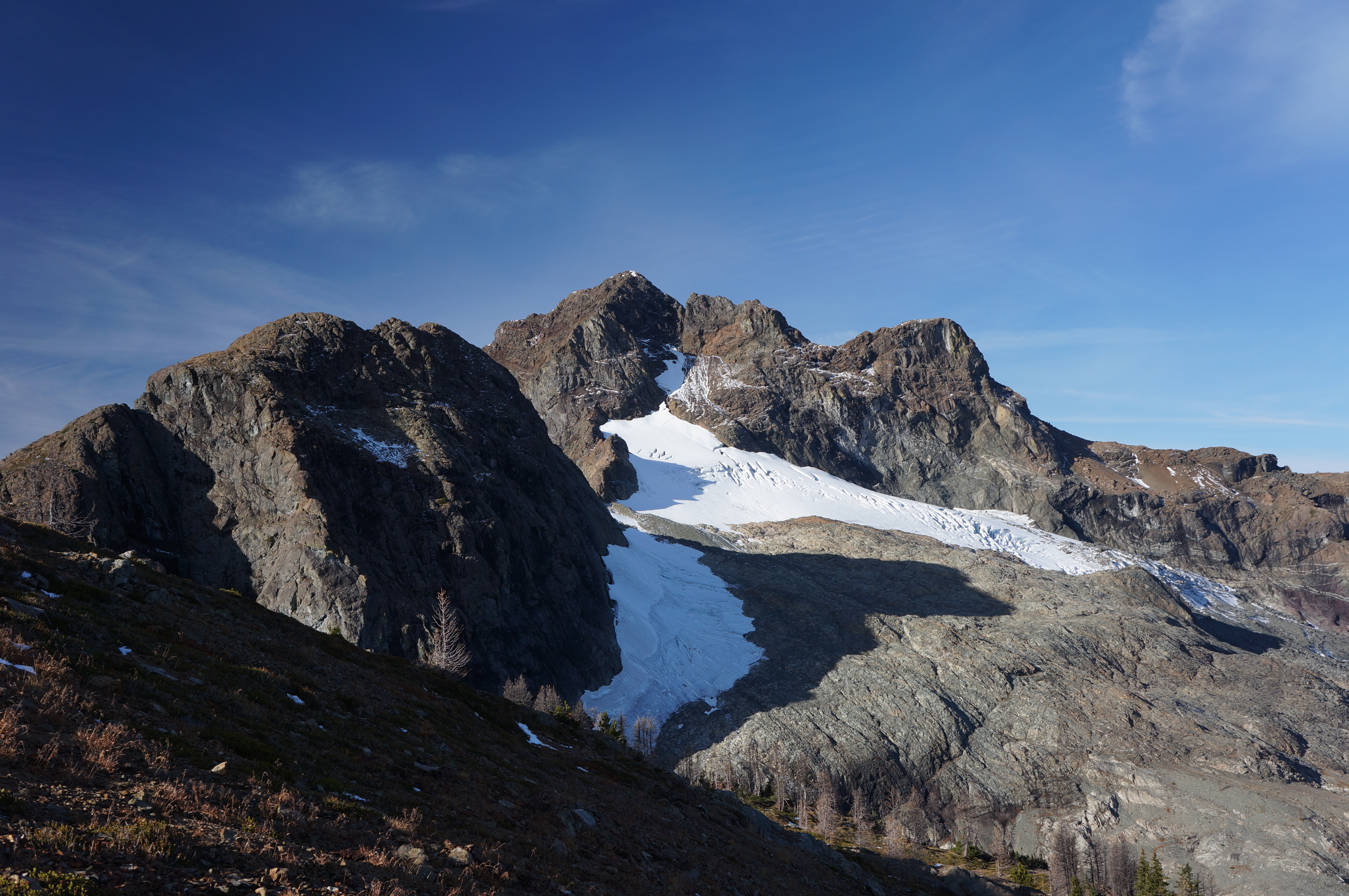
Jerry Glacier on Crater Mountain

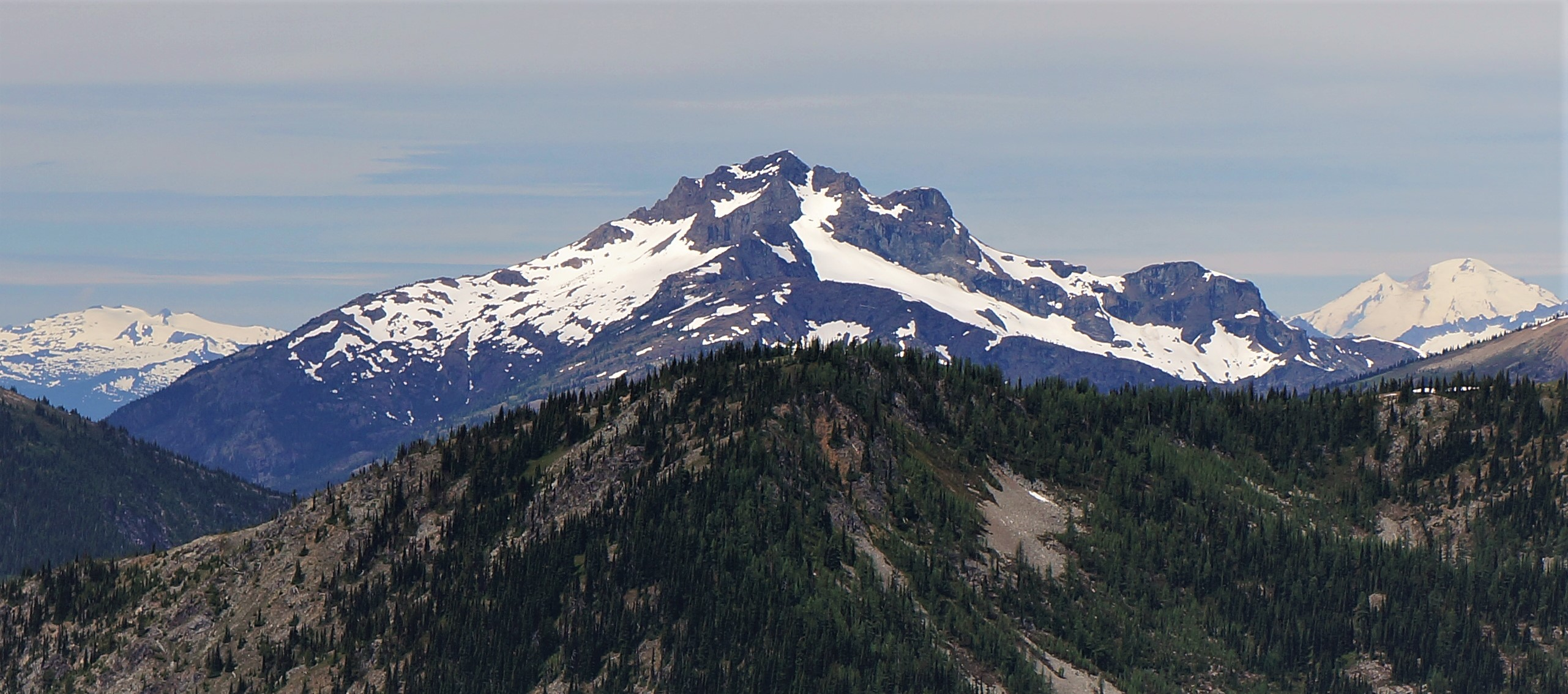
East aspect

== See also ==
- Geography of Washington (state)
- Geology of the Pacific Northwest
