= Jack Mountain =

Mountain in Washington state, United States

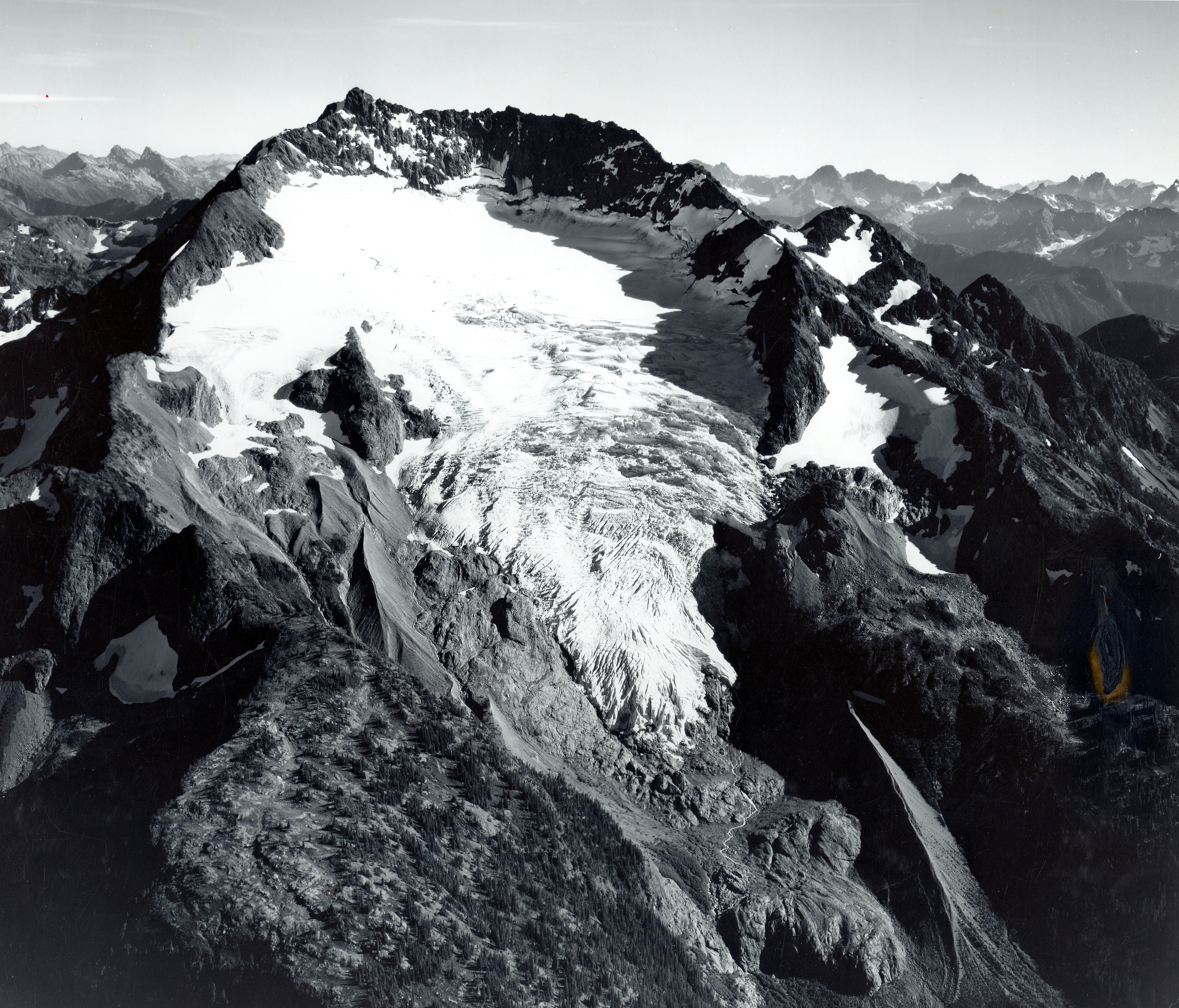
- Nohokomeen Glacier on the northwest face in 1966

Highest point
- Elevation: 9,075 ft (2,766 m) NAVD 88
- Prominence: 4,211 ft (1,284 m)
- Coordinates: 48°46′22″N 120°57′22″W

Geography
- Location: Whatcom County, Washington, U.S.
- Parent range: North Cascades

Climbing
- First ascent: 1904 by E.C. Barnard
- Easiest route: Climb with exposure, class 4

Jack Mountain is the 17th highest mountain in Washington state. It is one of the 10 non-volcanic peaks in Washington State over 9,000 feet (2,700 m). It towers dramatically over the south end of Ross Lake, rising 7,450 ft (2,270 m) above the lakeshore in only 3 horizontal miles (4.8 km). Nohokomeen Glacier nearly fills the cirque on the upper north slopes of the mountain.

== History ==
Jack Mountain was first described by surveyor Henry Custer in 1859, and was named for prospector Jack Rowley who was active on Canyon Creek. The first recorded ascent of Jack Mountain was made in 1904 by topographer E.C. Barnard. By the 1980s climbing routes had been established on most ridges, glaciers, and directions, seven in total. Most are class 4 but some involve true technical climbing. All are long routes with a great deal of vertical gain, meaning most parties take three to four days to climb the mountain.

== Geology ==
=== Rock types ===
The mountain is composed mostly of Metavolcanic rock and Metasedimentary rock from the Hozameen Range. Most predominant is Greenstone from the Jurassic to Permian periods. Most surface material is heavily eroded, by water Glacier ice. The lower flanks of the mountain in the Devils creek basin Maine sedimentary rock from the lower Cretaceous period, part of the Harts Pass Formation. The lower flanks of the mountain on the Ross lake side are composed of many different rock types including Orthogneiss, Ultramafic rock, low grade Phyllite, Tonalite, Continental glacier drift, Diorite, and Schist.

=== Faults and formation ===
The Jack Mountain area consists of one small thrust fault, and a few other normal faults, none showing any seismic activity. Jack Mountain was created when the Hozameen Range was thrusted over the younger Harts Pass formation to the east. Most likely caused by the Ross Lake Fault to the west. The lower flanks of the mountain to the west were created by the Ruby Creek Heterogeneous plutonic belt.

== Geographical features ==
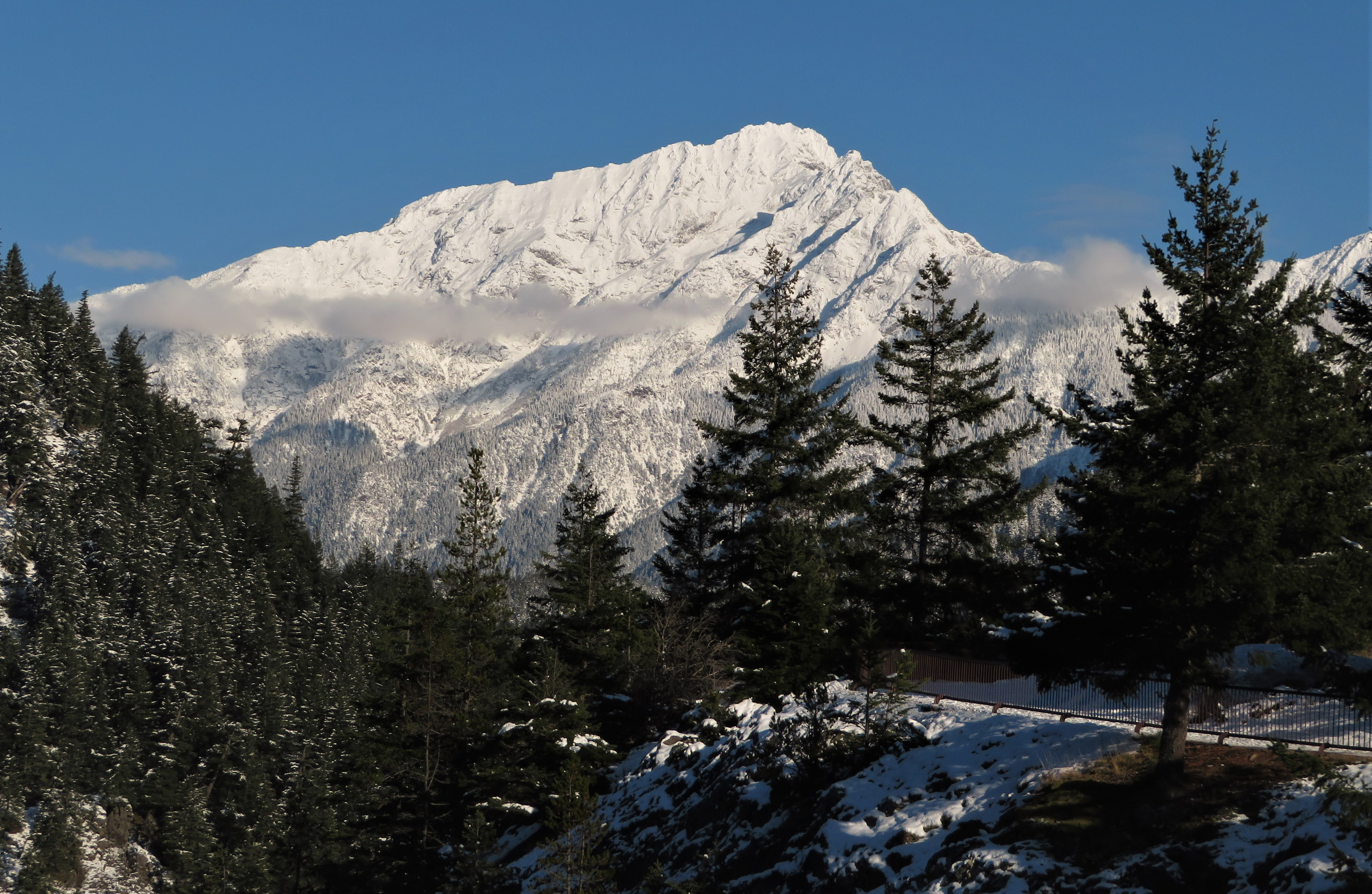
West aspect, from Diablo Lake Vista Point

- Nohokomeen Glacier fills northwestern side of mountain
- Northeast glacier steep and heavily crevassed small glacier
- East glacier small pocket glacier on the east side
- Northwest glacier, small hanging glacier west of summit ridge
- Crater creek, main southside drainage
- Devils creek, main northside drainage
- Nohokomeen falls, May creek water fall over headwall
- Roland creek is located on the steep westside, its tributary's hold many waterfall.

== Routes ==
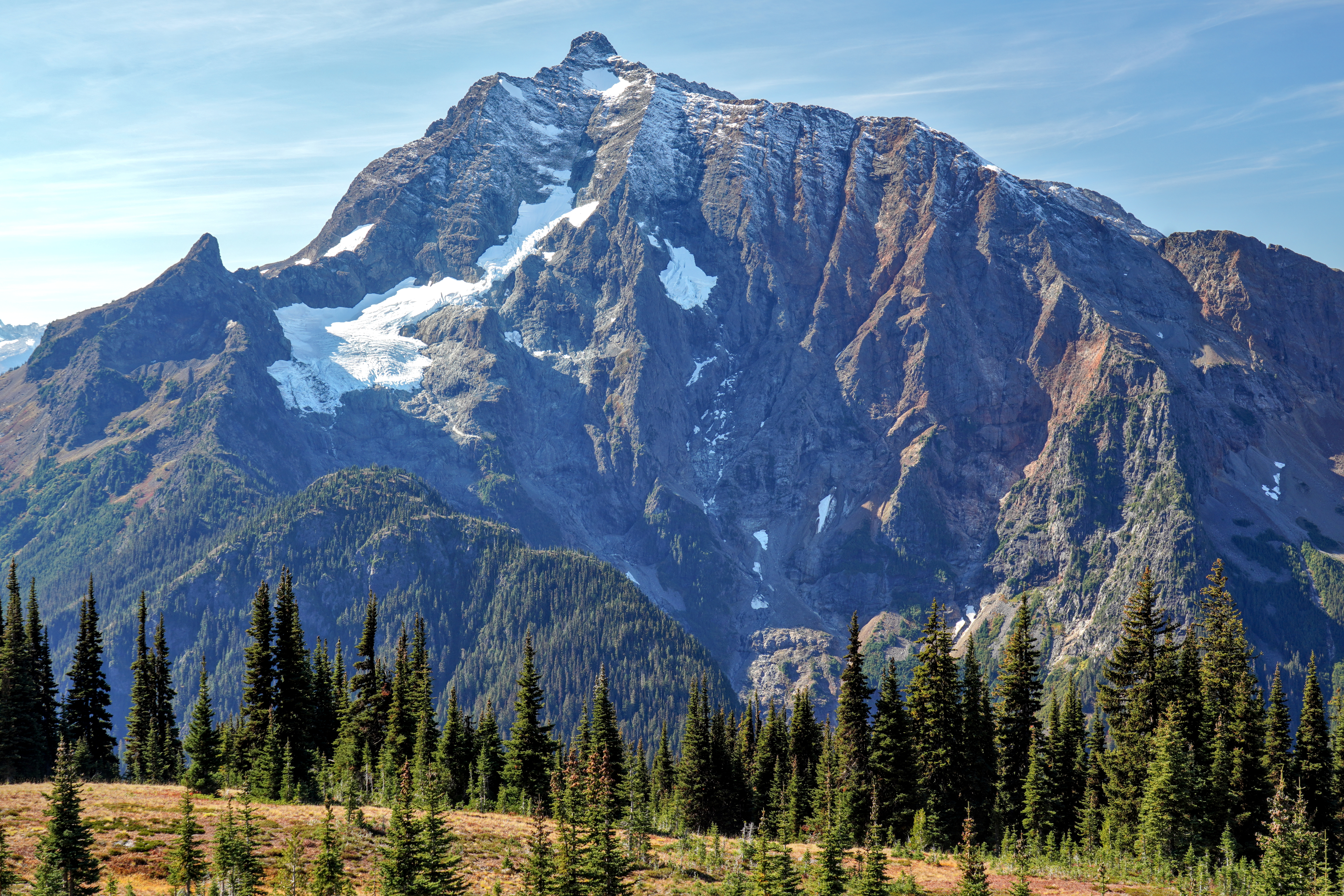
Northeast aspect

- Southeast Ridge first ascent John Anderson and Alan Kearney August 1977. Grade III, class 5.6
- Southeast route class 4
- East ridge first ascent Carl and Gordon Skoog July 16, 1984. Grade II, class 4.
- Northeast Glacier first ascent Fred Beckey, Dallas Kloke, Reed Tindall July 19, 1978.
- North Ridge first ascent Joe Vance and Bill Weitkamp August 1, 1971. Grade II class 4
- Southwest Ridge class 4
- South Face class 4
