= Hozomeen Mountain =

Mountain in Washington (state), United States

Hozomeen Mountain, North Peak
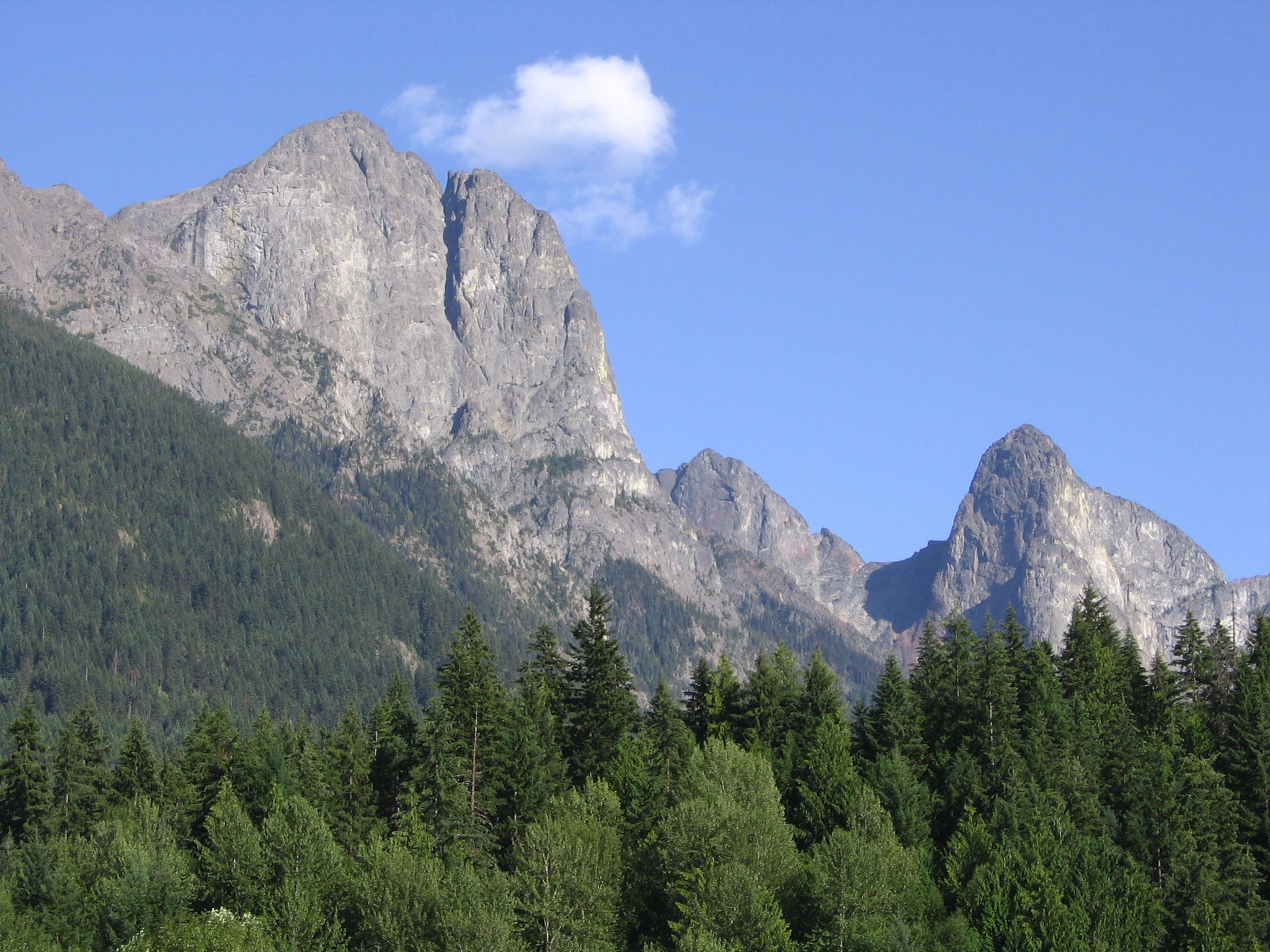
- Hozomeen Mountain

Highest point
- Elevation: 8,071 ft (2,460 m) NAVD 88
- Prominence: 3,932 ft (1,198 m)
- Coordinates: 48°58′56″N 121°00′43″W

Geography
- Location: Whatcom County, Washington, U.S.
- Parent range: North Cascades
- Topo map: USGS Hozomeen Mountain

Climbing
- First ascent: September 6, 1904 by Sledge Tatum, George E. Loudon, Jr.
- Easiest route: class 4 snow/rock scramble

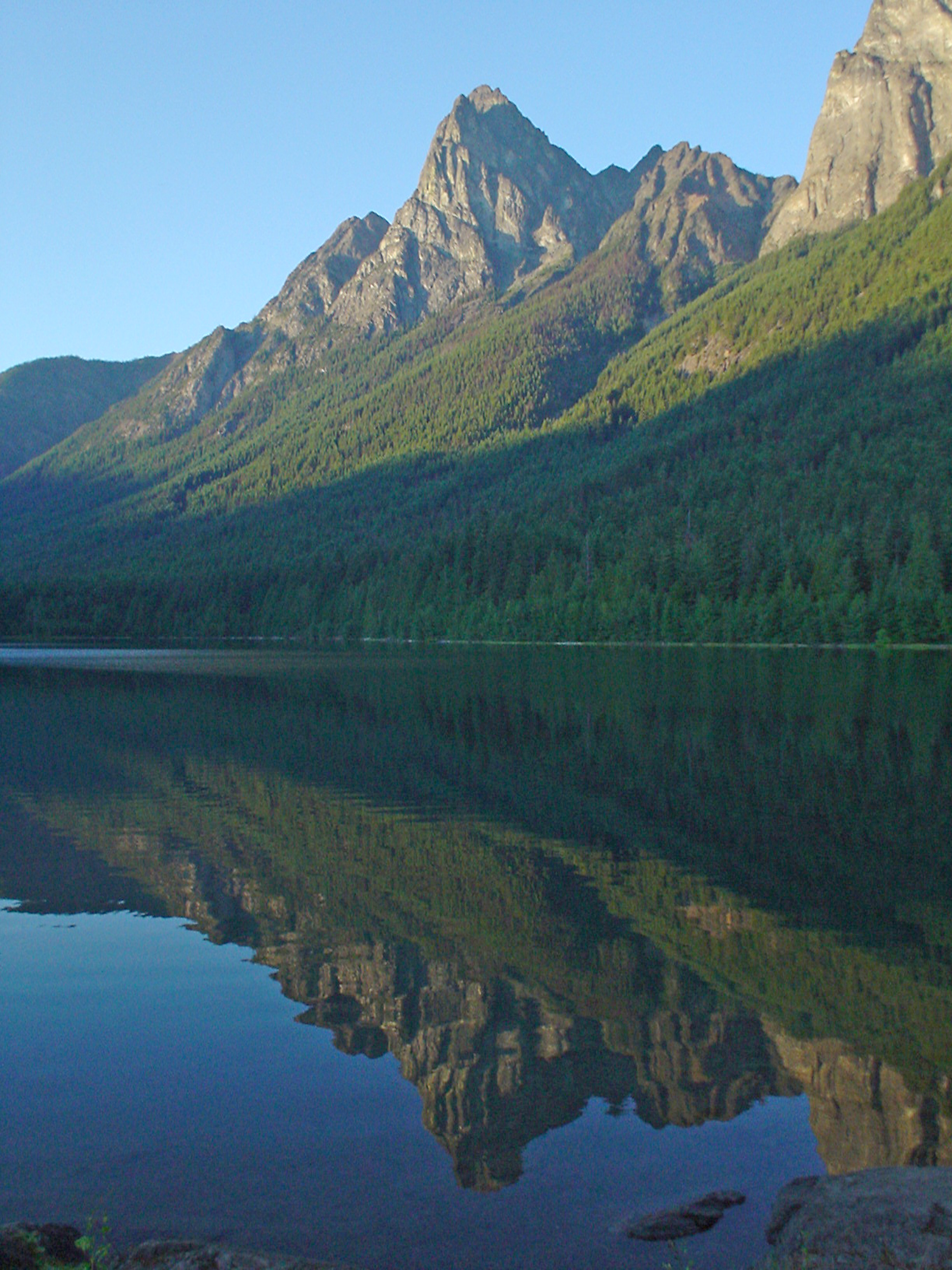
View from Hozomeen Lake

Hozomeen Mountain is a double-summited rock peak on the east side of Ross Lake in the North Cascades of Washington state. Despite its modest absolute elevation, it is notable for the large, steep drops from both of its summits to the surrounding terrain.

== History ==
The name "Hozomeen" is derived from Salish, a geographically broad language group of the indigenous bands of southern British Columbia and northern Washington State. The name appeared on a sketch map prepared for members of the first boundary survey of the 49th parallel, ca. 1857-1860, designating the name of the mountain. The map was drawn by Thiusoloc, one of surveyor and topographer Henry Custer's Salish guides, and like other geographic features labeled on the map, it recorded Salish place names. According to Annie York, a native Salish speaker, "Hozomeen" refers to "sharp, like a sharp knife." and links the name to the ca. 9,000 year long tradition of indigenous use of Hozomeen chert (a flint-like mineral) to make a variety of subsistence and hunting tools.

=== Hozomeen North Peak ===
(the main summit) was first climbed on September 6, 1904 by Sledge Tatum and George E. Loudon, Jr. of the Boundary Survey, from the northeast. Other routes exist on the South Ridge and Southwest Buttress. The north summit is Washington's fourth steepest peak, with an average angle from the summit of 38.86°

=== Hozomeen South Peak ===
At an elevation of 8,003 feet (2,439 m), the South Peak lies approximately 1 mile (1.6 km) southeast of the higher North Peak. It was first climbed on May 30, 1947 by Fred Beckey, Melvin Marcus, Jerry O'Neil, Ken Prestrud, Herb Staley, and Charles Welsh, via the Southwest Route. While lower than the North Peak, it has a north face which is "almost completely vertical for 1,000 feet." This makes it the steepest peak in Washington with an average steepness angle of 42.62° from the summit.

=== Hozomeen South-west Peak ===
7,471 feet (2,277 m) Hozomeen South-west is a steep sub-peak, with only 511 feet (156 m) of prominence, first climbed by John Dudra and Howard Rode in 1951. Easiest route is a peak rib and gully loose class 3, two other routes exist. The peaks steepest side is the northwest face.

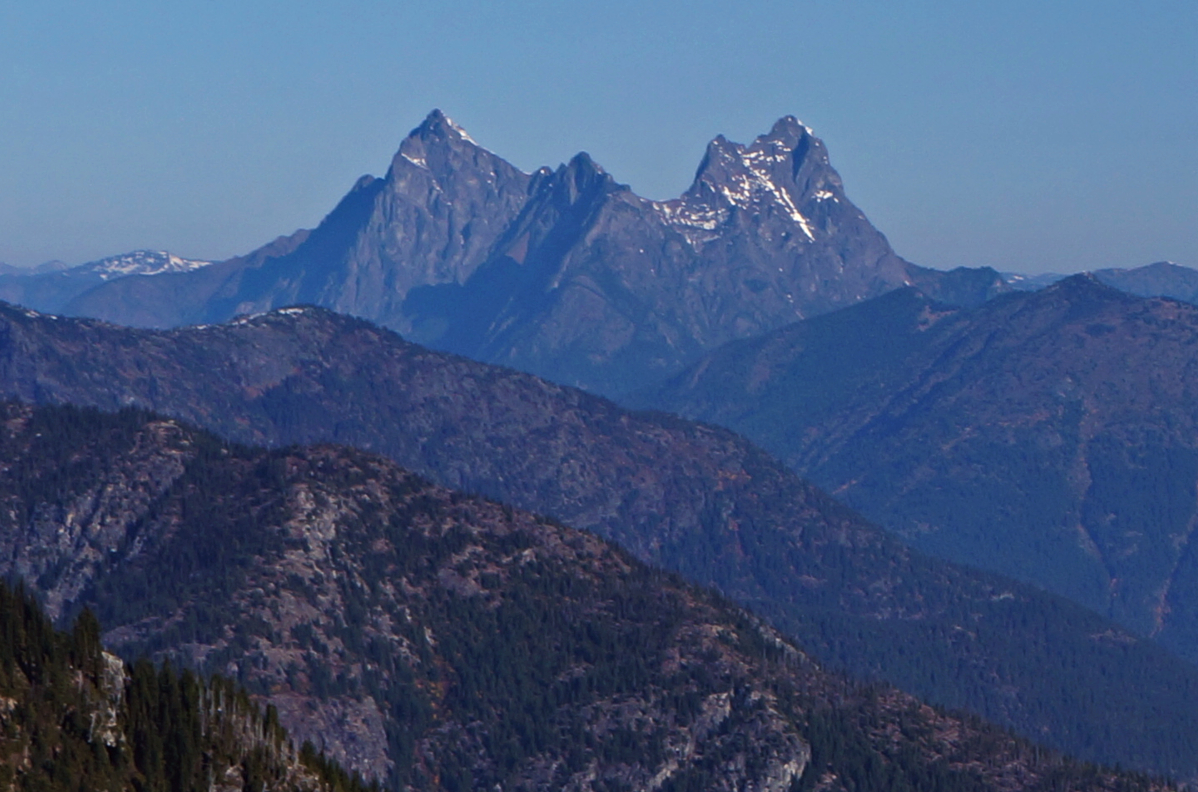
Hozomeen from Sourdough Mountain

=== Mentions in Media ===
Hozomeen Mountain is also mentioned often in the latter portions of Jack Kerouac's 1958 novel The Dharma Bums and the beginning of his 1965 novel Desolation Angels when Kerouac is stationed at a fire lookout on nearby Desolation Peak. A rhyme in The Dharma Bums goes "Hozomeen, Hozomeen, the most mournful mountain I ever seen".

=== Routes ===
==== Hozomeen North ====
- North Route, class 3-4
- Northeast Buttress, first ascent Sledge Tatum, and George E. Loudon Jr. September 6, 1904. class 3-4
- South Ridge, class 3-4
- Southwest Buttress, first ascent Dick Culbert, and Alice Purdey August 1968. Grade IV class 5.7 to class 5.10a hard to protect, very few successful ascents.
- West Face Grade IV class 5.9 Very difficult to protect, considered one of the hardest routes.

==== Hozomeen South ====
- Southwest Route, first ascent Fred Beckey, Melvin Marcus, Jerry O'Neil, Ken Prestrud, Herb Staley, and Charles Welsh Grade III+ class 5.6
- North Ridge, first ascent Fred Douglas, and Paul Starr labor day weekend 1974. Grade IV+ class 5.5
- Southeast Buttress, first ascent Dave Adams, Don Goodman, Ken Johnson, and John Petroske. Grade III class 5.6

==== Hozomeen South-west ====
- Southwest Route, first ascent John Dudra and Howard Rode in 1951. class 3
- South Ridge, first ascent Dick Culbert, Gary Johncox, and Bill Sharpe 1958. Exposed class 5.0
- West buttress and face, first ascent Edmund Zenger, Juergen Oswald, Gernot Walter July 26, 1969. Exposed Grade III class 5.5

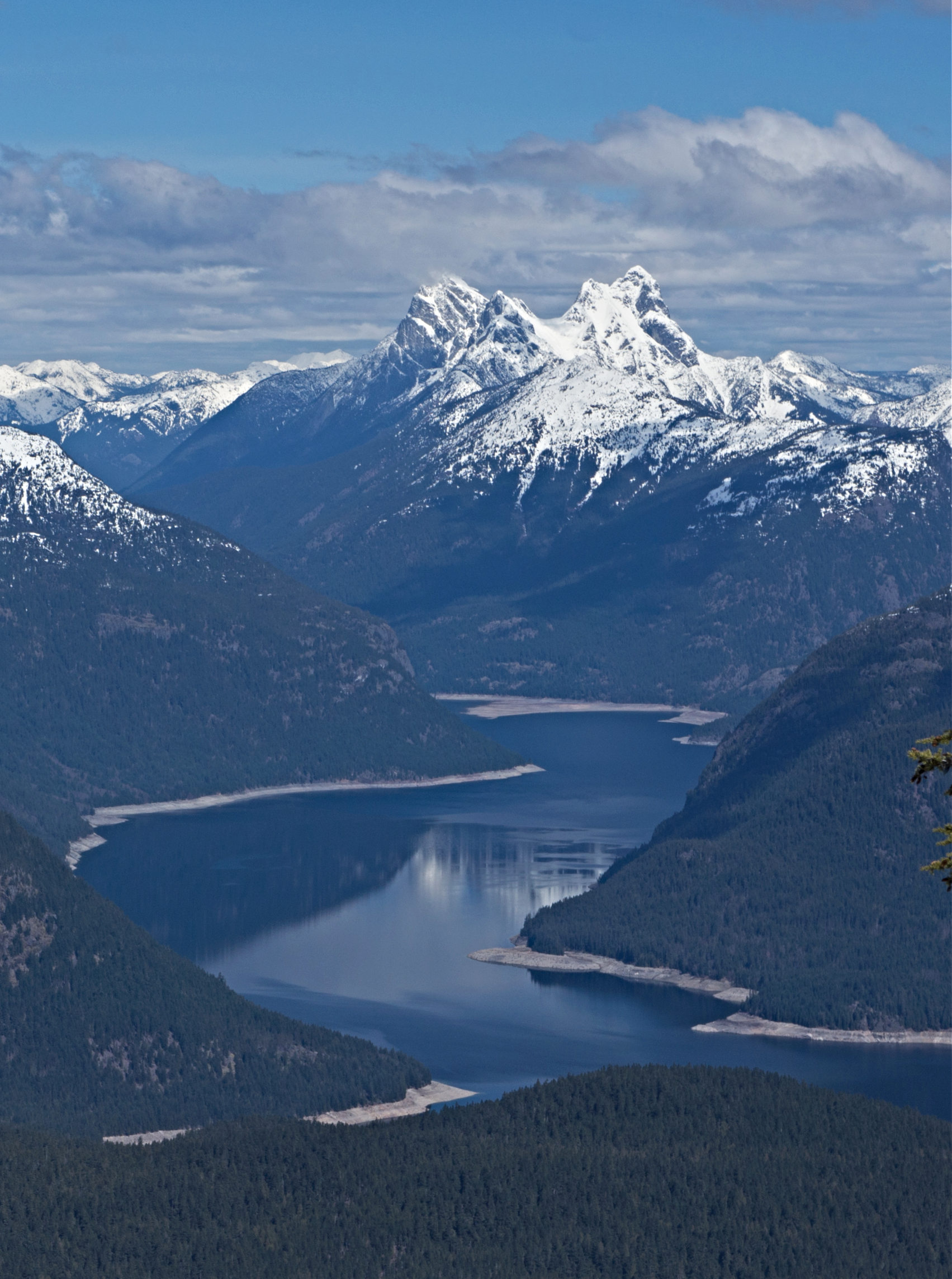
Hozomeen Mountain and Ross Lake seen from Ruby Mountain

== See also ==
- Hozameen Range
