= Ross Lake (Washington) =

Man-made reservoir in Washington state, United States and British Columbia, Canada

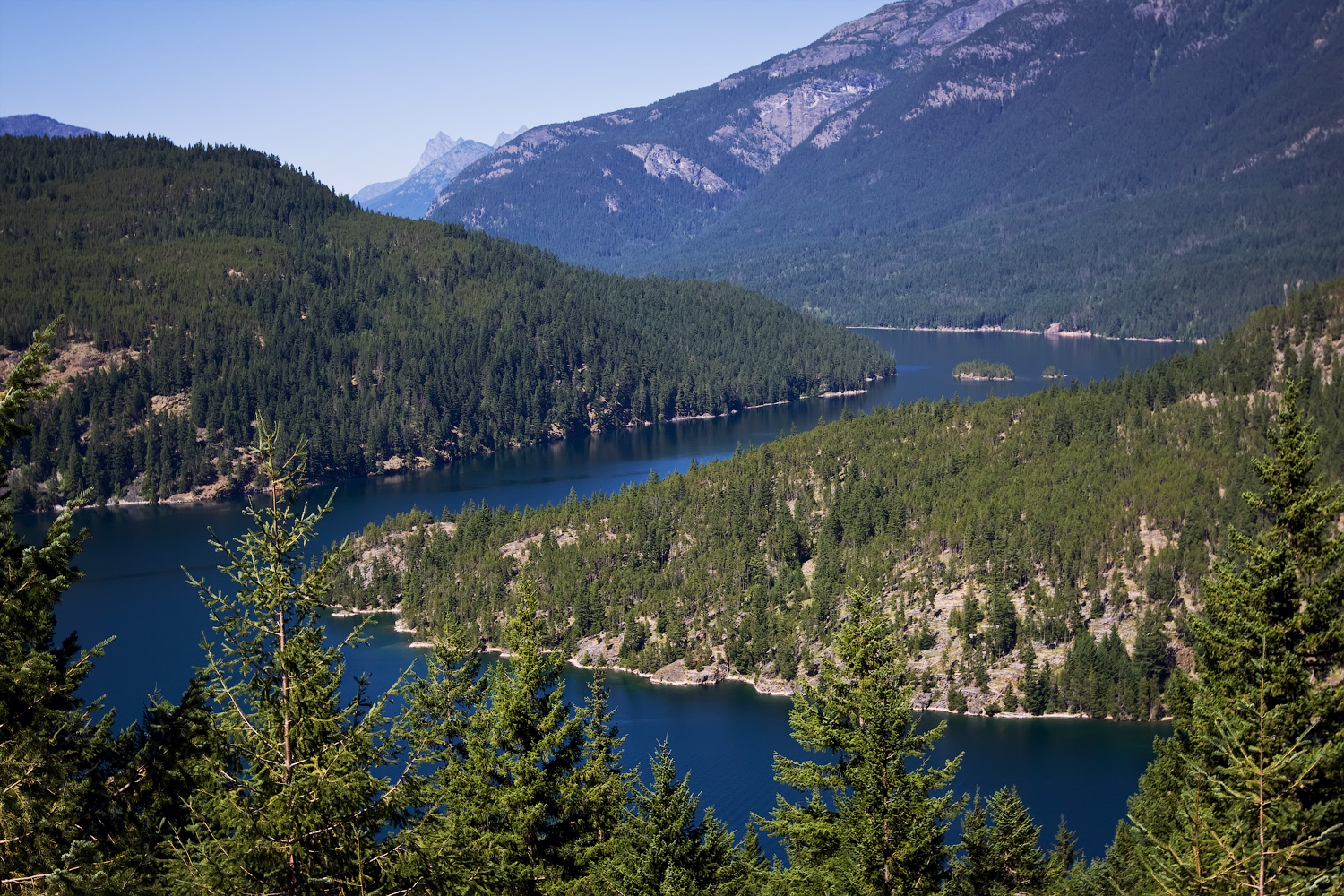
- Ross Lake, 2012

- Location within Washington (state) Location within British Columbia Location within North America
- Location: Ross Lake National Recreation Area, Whatcom County, Washington, United States; Skagit Valley Provincial Park, British Columbia, Canada
- Coordinates: 48°43′54″N 121°04′02″W
- Lake type: reservoir
- Basin countries: United States, Canada
- Max. length: 23 mi (37 km)
- Max. width: 1.5 mi (2.4 km)
- Max. depth: 540 ft (160 m)
- Water volume: 1,430,000 acre⋅ft (1.76 km^{3})
- Surface elevation: 1,604 ft (489 m)
- Islands: Cat Island, Tenmile Island, Little Jerusalem Island, Cougar Island
- Settlements: none

Ross Lake is a large reservoir in the North Cascade mountains of northern Washington state, United States, and southwestern British Columbia, Canada. The lake runs approximately north–south, is 23 miles (37 km) long, up to 1.5 miles (2.5 km) wide, and the full reservoir elevation is 1,604 feet above sea level (489 m).

The U.S. portion of Ross Lake is in the Ross Lake National Recreation Area. North Cascades National Park is adjacent to the west and south, while the Pasayten Wilderness is east of the lake. In British Columbia the lake is a part of Skagit Valley Provincial Park, and Manning Provincial Park is nearby to the east.

== Hydrology ==
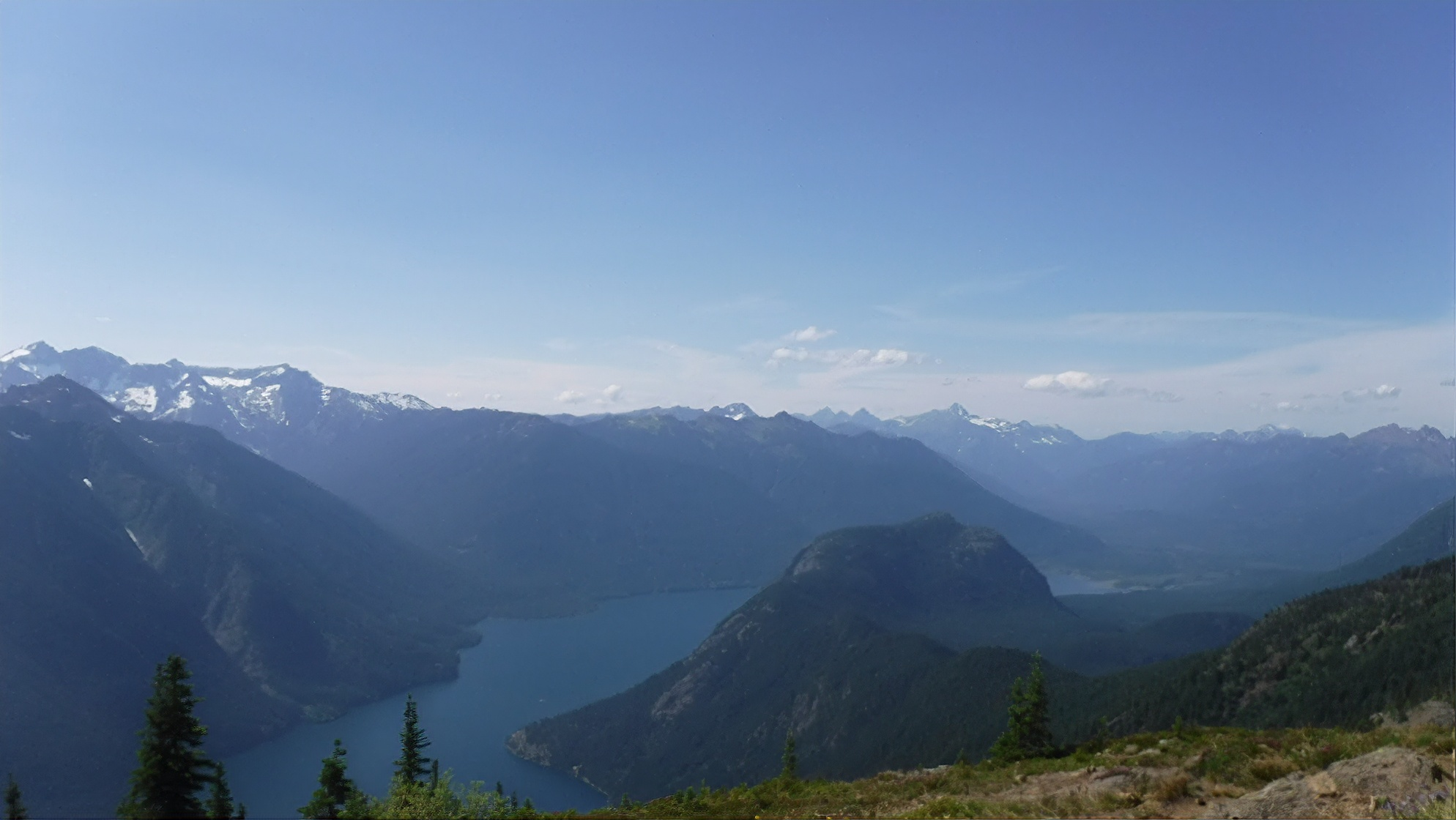
Ross Lake from Desolation Peak in 2017

Ross Lake is formed by the impoundment of the Skagit River by Ross Dam, which is operated by Seattle City Light for hydroelectric power generation serving Seattle, Washington, and surrounding areas. After leaving Ross Lake, the Skagit River flows through two more reservoirs before running to Puget Sound.

Looking north up Ross Lake, with Hozomeen Mountain in the left-background and Desolation Peak in the center-background

High peaks surround Ross Lake in all directions, and include Hozomeen Mountain, Ruby Mountain, Desolation Peak, and Jack Mountain, the summit of which is over 7,000 feet above the elevation of the lake. Rivers and creeks flowing into Ross Lake include the upper Skagit River, Hozomeen Creek, Silver Creek, Little Beaver Creek, Arctic Creek, Lightning Creek, Devils Creek, Big Beaver Creek, and Ruby Creek. Most of these creeks originate from glaciers and snowfields high in the North Cascades.

== History ==
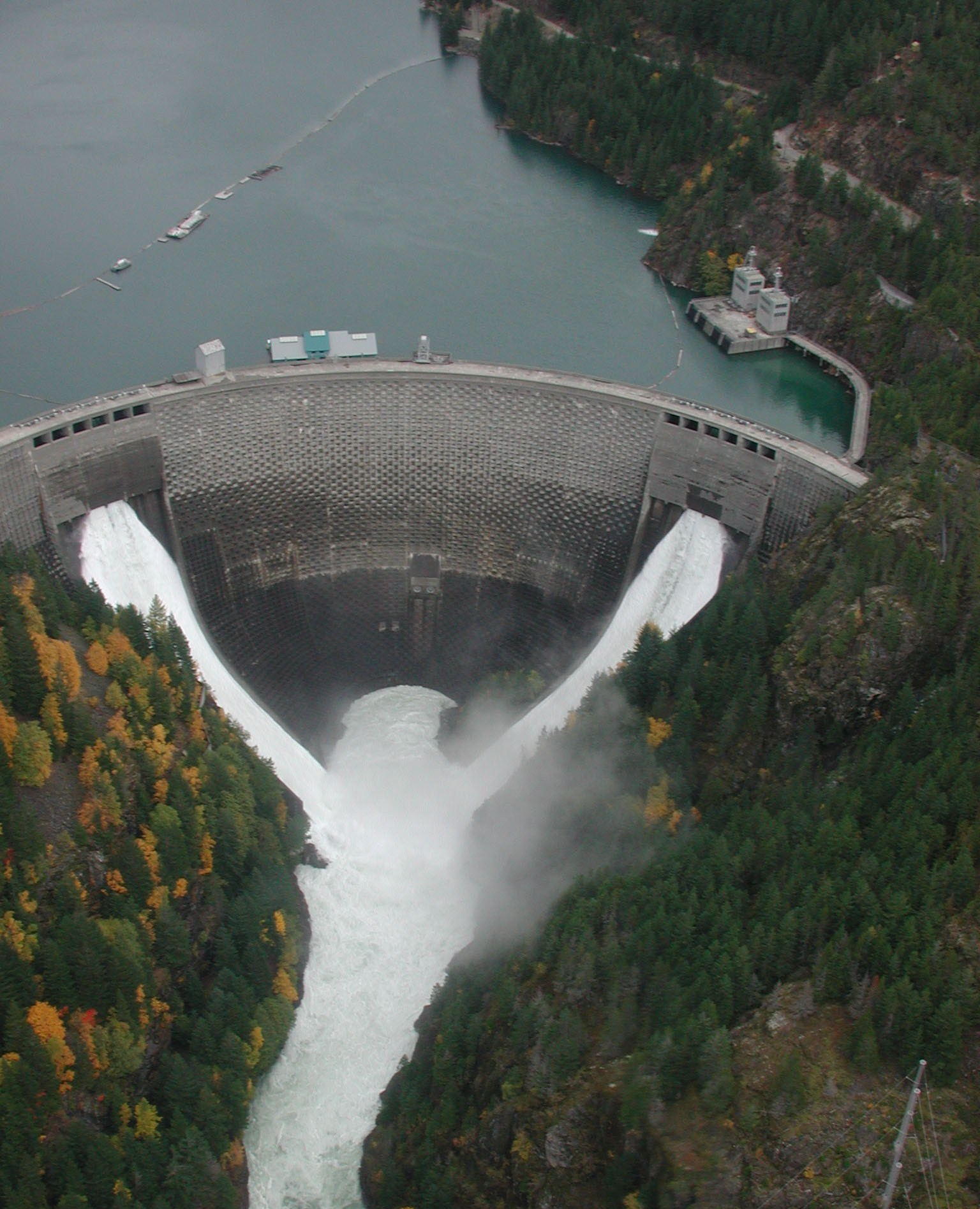
Ross Dam, forming Ross Lake

Ross Dam, originally called Ruby Dam, was built in three stages between 1937 and 1949, and currently stands 540 feet (160 m) tall. A fourth stage of construction was planned for the dam; however, in 1984 Seattle City Light made an electricity-purchasing agreement with British Columbia which delayed any further expansion of the Ross Lake Dam for 80 years. The lake and dam are named after James D. Ross, the superintendent of the Seattle City Light's Skagit River Hydroelectric Project, which built the dam.

== Recreation ==
Ross Lake is a major recreation destination within the North Cascades, attracting visitors with a multitude of fishing, canoeing, kayaking, and hiking opportunities. The trout fishing, in particular, is well-renowned. Ross Dam, as well as Gorge and Diablo dams downstream, are barriers preventing salmon from travelling between Ross Lake and the Pacific Ocean; thus, Ross Lake has no anadromous fish. Camping is allowed at a number of boat-in and hike-in campsites around the lake. Backcountry camping permits (free, first-come, first-served) are required, and may be obtained from the National Park Service in Marblemount.

The lake is also home to a floating resort called the Ross Lake Resort. Made up of a dozen cabins and 3 bunkhouses, it is situated approximately a quarter mile from the dam and rests entirely on log booms. During the winter, when lake levels shrink, the resort detaches from its shore moorings and relocates to the center of the lake. This is due to lower water levels caused by annual drawdowns of the lake for flood control of the Skagit River.

A road from the Canadian side of the lake ends just inside the US. Travelers do not have to report to an official Port of Entry (as required at the nearby Pacific Crest Trail crossing), as they must reenter Canada to leave.

== Climate ==
Ross Lake has a mediterranean climate (Köppen Csb).

Climate data for Ross Lake, Washington (Ross Dam), 1991–2020 normals, extremes 1960–present
Month	Jan	Feb	Mar	Apr	May	Jun	Jul	Aug	Sep	Oct	Nov	Dec	Year
Record high °F (°C)	57 (14)	61 (16)	71 (22)	83 (28)	97 (36)	108 (42)	103 (39)	102 (39)	98 (37)	86 (30)	64 (18)	57 (14)	108 (42)
Mean maximum °F (°C)	47.1 (8.4)	50.3 (10.2)	61.1 (16.2)	72.8 (22.7)	84.0 (28.9)	88.6 (31.4)	95.2 (35.1)	94.3 (34.6)	86.5 (30.3)	70.8 (21.6)	53.7 (12.1)	47.0 (8.3)	97.0 (36.1)
Mean daily maximum °F (°C)	37.5 (3.1)	41.3 (5.2)	47.3 (8.5)	55.7 (13.2)	65.1 (18.4)	69.9 (21.1)	78.6 (25.9)	79.0 (26.1)	70.4 (21.3)	56.0 (13.3)	43.7 (6.5)	37.6 (3.1)	56.8 (13.8)
Daily mean °F (°C)	33.8 (1.0)	35.9 (2.2)	40.2 (4.6)	46.8 (8.2)	54.9 (12.7)	59.9 (15.5)	66.8 (19.3)	67.4 (19.7)	60.4 (15.8)	49.2 (9.6)	39.5 (4.2)	34.0 (1.1)	49.1 (9.5)
Mean daily minimum °F (°C)	30.0 (−1.1)	30.5 (−0.8)	33.2 (0.7)	37.9 (3.3)	44.8 (7.1)	49.9 (9.9)	55.1 (12.8)	55.8 (13.2)	50.4 (10.2)	42.5 (5.8)	35.3 (1.8)	30.5 (−0.8)	41.3 (5.2)
Mean minimum °F (°C)	18.0 (−7.8)	21.5 (−5.8)	25.5 (−3.6)	31.2 (−0.4)	36.4 (2.4)	43.0 (6.1)	48.1 (8.9)	48.9 (9.4)	42.9 (6.1)	33.4 (0.8)	24.9 (−3.9)	19.4 (−7.0)	10.9 (−11.7)
Record low °F (°C)	−1 (−18)	5 (−15)	10 (−12)	27 (−3)	27 (−3)	36 (2)	37 (3)	40 (4)	34 (1)	16 (−9)	7 (−14)	−1 (−18)	−1 (−18)
Average precipitation inches (mm)	9.72 (247)	5.98 (152)	6.37 (162)	3.23 (82)	2.06 (52)	1.68 (43)	0.99 (25)	1.21 (31)	2.50 (64)	6.72 (171)	11.07 (281)	9.23 (234)	60.76 (1,544)
Average snowfall inches (cm)	17.2 (44)	11.9 (30)	7.8 (20)	0.3 (0.76)	0.0 (0.0)	0.0 (0.0)	0.0 (0.0)	0.0 (0.0)	0.0 (0.0)	0.0 (0.0)	5.8 (15)	23.7 (60)	66.7 (169.76)
Average extreme snow depth inches (cm)	12.5 (32)	10.0 (25)	6.9 (18)	0.2 (0.51)	0.0 (0.0)	0.0 (0.0)	0.0 (0.0)	0.0 (0.0)	0.0 (0.0)	0.0 (0.0)	2.9 (7.4)	11.8 (30)	18.3 (46)
Average precipitation days (≥ 0.01 in)	18.6	15.3	18.1	14.5	11.8	11.3	6.3	5.7	10.5	16.4	20.4	18.8	167.7
Average snowy days (≥ 0.1 in)	4.7	3.4	3.1	0.3	0.0	0.0	0.0	0.0	0.0	0.0	1.9	6.6	20.0
Source 1: NOAA
Source 2: National Weather Service

== See also ==
- Diablo Lake
- Skagit River Hydroelectric Project
- Ross Lake Fault
