= Pasayten Peak =

Mountain in Washington (state), United States

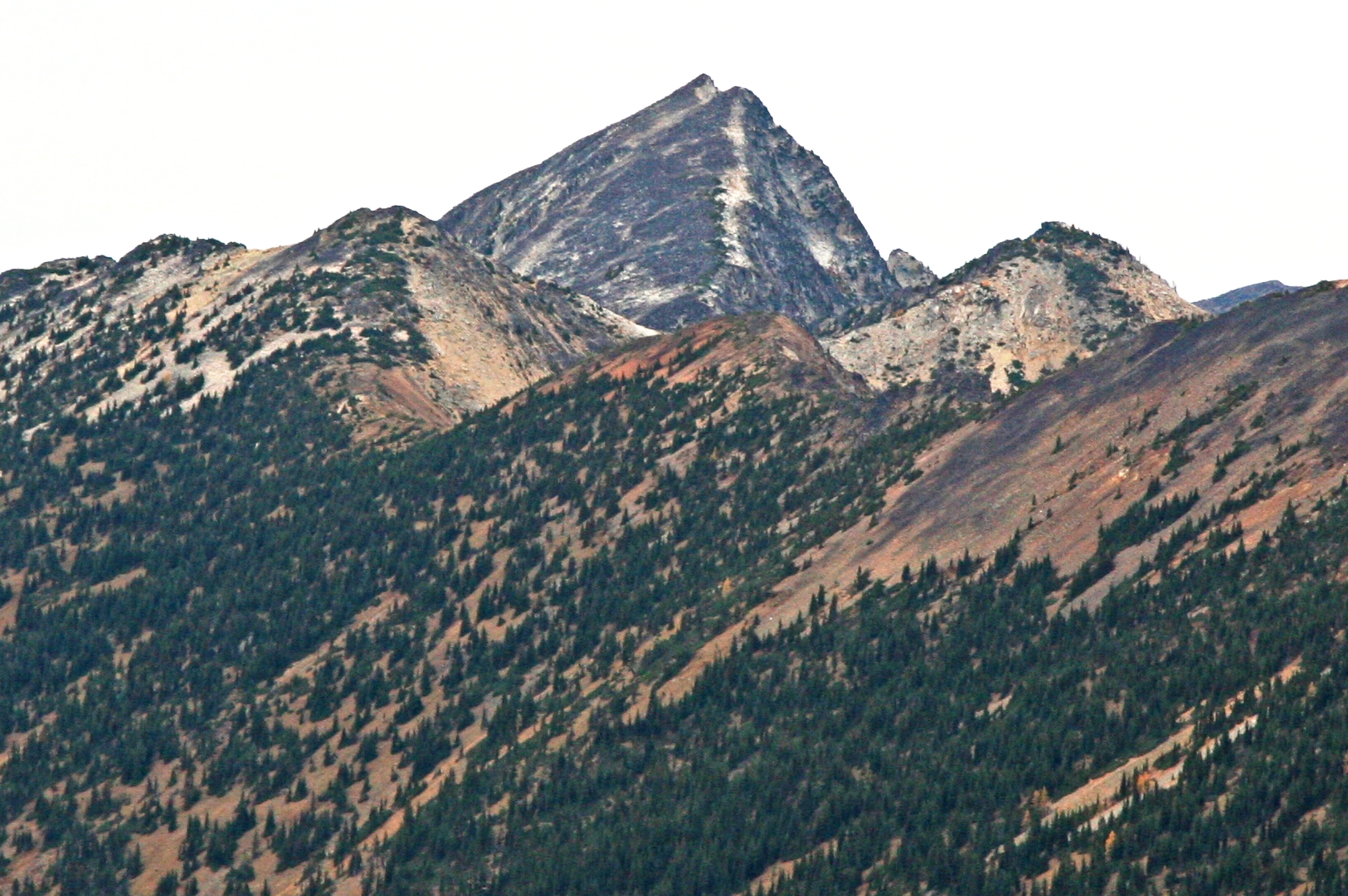
- Pasayten Peak centered behind Gold Ridge. South aspect from Slate Peak

Highest point
- Elevation: 7,850 ft (2,390 m)
- Prominence: 1,650 ft (500 m)
- Parent peak: Devils Peak (8,081 ft)
- Isolation: 3.02 mi (4.86 km)
- Coordinates: 48°47′43″N 120°40′15″W

Geography
- Location within Washington (state) Location within the United States
- Interactive map of Pasayten Peak
- Location: Pasayten Wilderness; Okanogan County; Washington, U.S.
- Parent range: Okanogan Range; North Cascades; Cascade Range
- Topo map: USGS Pasayten Peak

Geology
- Rock age: Late Cretaceous
- Rock type: quartz diorite

Climbing
- First ascent: 1925 or 1926 by Lage Wernstedt
- Easiest route: Scrambling class 2-3

Pasayten Peak is a 7,850-foot (2,390-metre) pyramidal-shaped mountain summit located in western Okanogan County in Washington state. It is part of the Okanogan Range which is a sub-range of the North Cascades. The mountain is situated in the Pasayten Wilderness, on land administered by the Okanogan–Wenatchee National Forest. The nearest higher neighbor is Wildcat Mountain, 3 miles (4.8 km) to the east-southeast, and Slate Peak is set 3.7 miles (6.0 km) to the south. Pasayten Peak is the high point of Gold Ridge, and precipitation runoff from this peak drains into the West and Middle Forks of Pasayten River.

== Climate ==
Most weather fronts originate in the Pacific Ocean, and travel northeast toward the Cascade Mountains. As fronts approach the North Cascades, they are forced upward by the peaks of the Cascade Range, causing them to drop their moisture in the form of rain or snowfall onto the Cascades (Orographic lift). As a result, the west side of the North Cascades experiences higher precipitation than the east side, especially during the winter months in the form of snowfall. During winter months, weather is usually cloudy, but, due to high pressure systems over the Pacific Ocean that intensify during summer months, there is often little or no cloud cover during the summer.

== Geology ==
The North Cascades features some of the most rugged topography in the Cascade Range with craggy peaks, spires, ridges, and deep glacial valleys. Geological events occurring many years ago created the diverse topography and drastic elevation changes over the Cascade Range leading to the various climate differences.

The history of the formation of the Cascade Mountains dates back millions of years ago to the late Eocene Epoch. With the North American Plate overriding the Pacific Plate, episodes of volcanic igneous activity persisted. In addition, small fragments of the oceanic and continental lithosphere called terranes created the North Cascades about 50 million years ago.

During the Pleistocene period dating back over two million years ago, glaciation advancing and retreating repeatedly scoured the landscape leaving deposits of rock debris. The U-shaped cross section of the river valleys is a result of recent glaciation. Uplift and faulting in combination with glaciation have been the dominant processes which have created the tall peaks and deep valleys of the North Cascades area.

== See also ==
- List of mountain peaks of Washington (state)
- Geography of the North Cascades
- Geology of the Pacific Northwest
