= Monument Peak (Washington) =

Mountain in Washington (state), United States

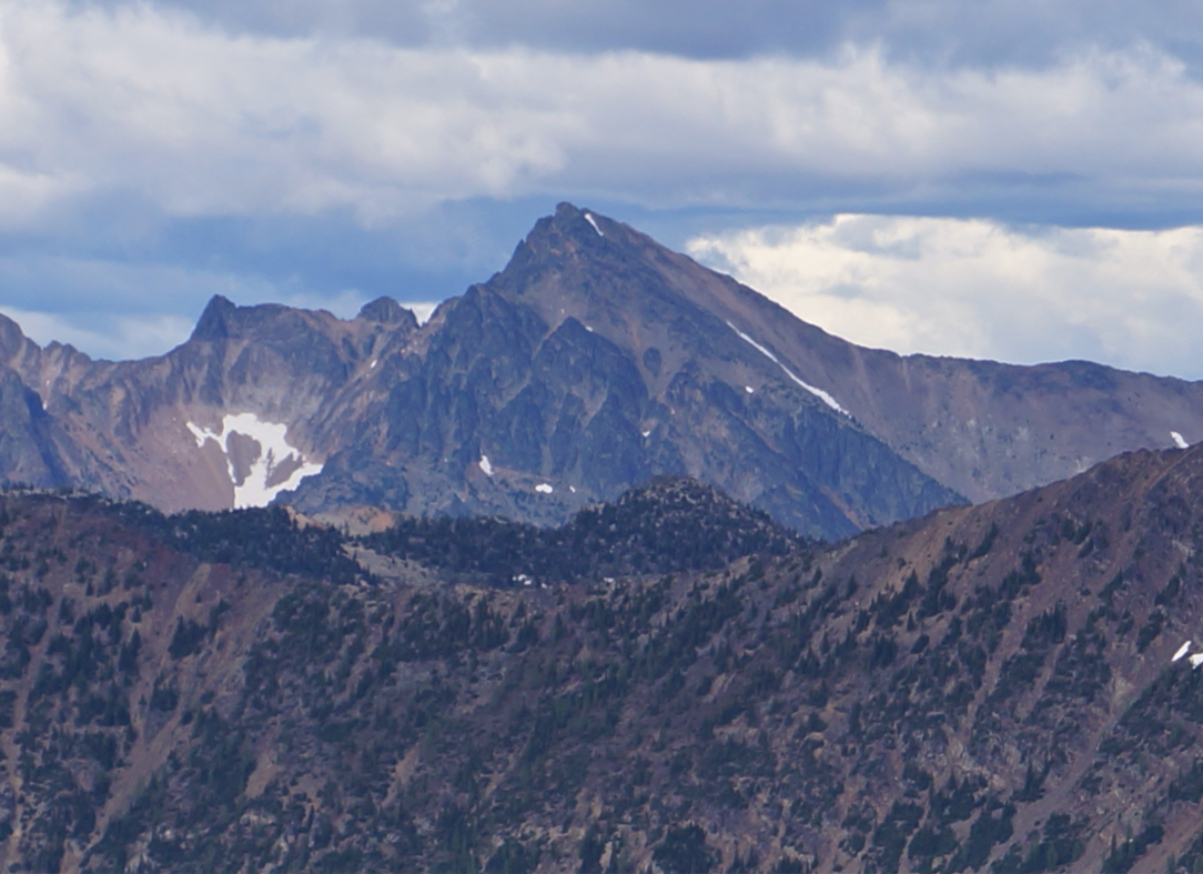
- Monument Peak seen from Slate Peak

Highest point
- Elevation: 8,597 ft (2,620 m) NAVD 88
- Prominence: 1,072 ft (327 m)
- Parent peak: Mount Lago
- Isolation: 2.46 mi (3.96 km)
- Coordinates: 48°47′39″N 120°32′32″W

Geography
- Location within Washington (state) Location within the United States
- Interactive map of Monument Peak
- Country: United States
- State: Washington
- County: Okanogan
- Protected area: Pasayten Wilderness
- Parent range: Okanogan Range; North Cascades; Cascade Range
- Topo map: USGS Mount Lago

Geology
- Rock type: granite

Climbing
- First ascent: 1978 by Fred Beckey, John Roper
- Easiest route: class 3 scrambling

Monument Peak is an 8,597-foot (2,620-metre) mountain summit located in western Okanogan County in Washington state. It is part of the Okanogan Range which is a sub-range of the North Cascades. The mountain is situated in the Pasayten Wilderness, on land administered by the Okanogan–Wenatchee National Forest. The nearest higher peak is Mount Lago, 2.42 miles (3.89 km) to the north. Precipitation runoff from Monument Peak drains east into Monument Creek, and west into Eureka Creek, which are both part of the Methow River drainage basin. Topographic relief is significant as the summit rises 3,800 feet (1,200 meters) above Eureka Creek in 1.25 mile (2 km).

== Climate ==
Weather fronts originating in the Pacific Ocean travel northeast toward the Cascade Mountains. As fronts approach the North Cascades, they are forced upward by the peaks of the Cascade Range (orographic lift), causing them to drop their moisture in the form of rain or snowfall onto the Cascades. As a result, the west side of the North Cascades experiences high precipitation, especially during the winter months in the form of snowfall. During winter months, weather is usually cloudy, but, due to high pressure systems over the Pacific Ocean that intensify during summer months, there is often little or no cloud cover during the summer.

== Geology ==
The North Cascades features some of the most rugged topography in the Cascade Range with craggy peaks, spires, ridges, and deep glacial valleys. Geological events occurring many years ago created the diverse topography and drastic elevation changes over the Cascade Range leading to the various climate differences.

The history of the formation of the Cascade Mountains dates back millions of years ago to the late Eocene Epoch. With the North American Plate overriding the Pacific Plate, episodes of volcanic igneous activity persisted. In addition, small fragments of the oceanic and continental lithosphere called terranes created the North Cascades about 50 million years ago.

During the Pleistocene period dating back over two million years ago, glaciation advancing and retreating repeatedly scoured the landscape leaving deposits of rock debris. The U-shaped cross section of the river valleys is a result of recent glaciation. Uplift and faulting in combination with glaciation have been the dominant processes which have created the tall peaks and deep valleys of the North Cascades area.

== Gallery ==
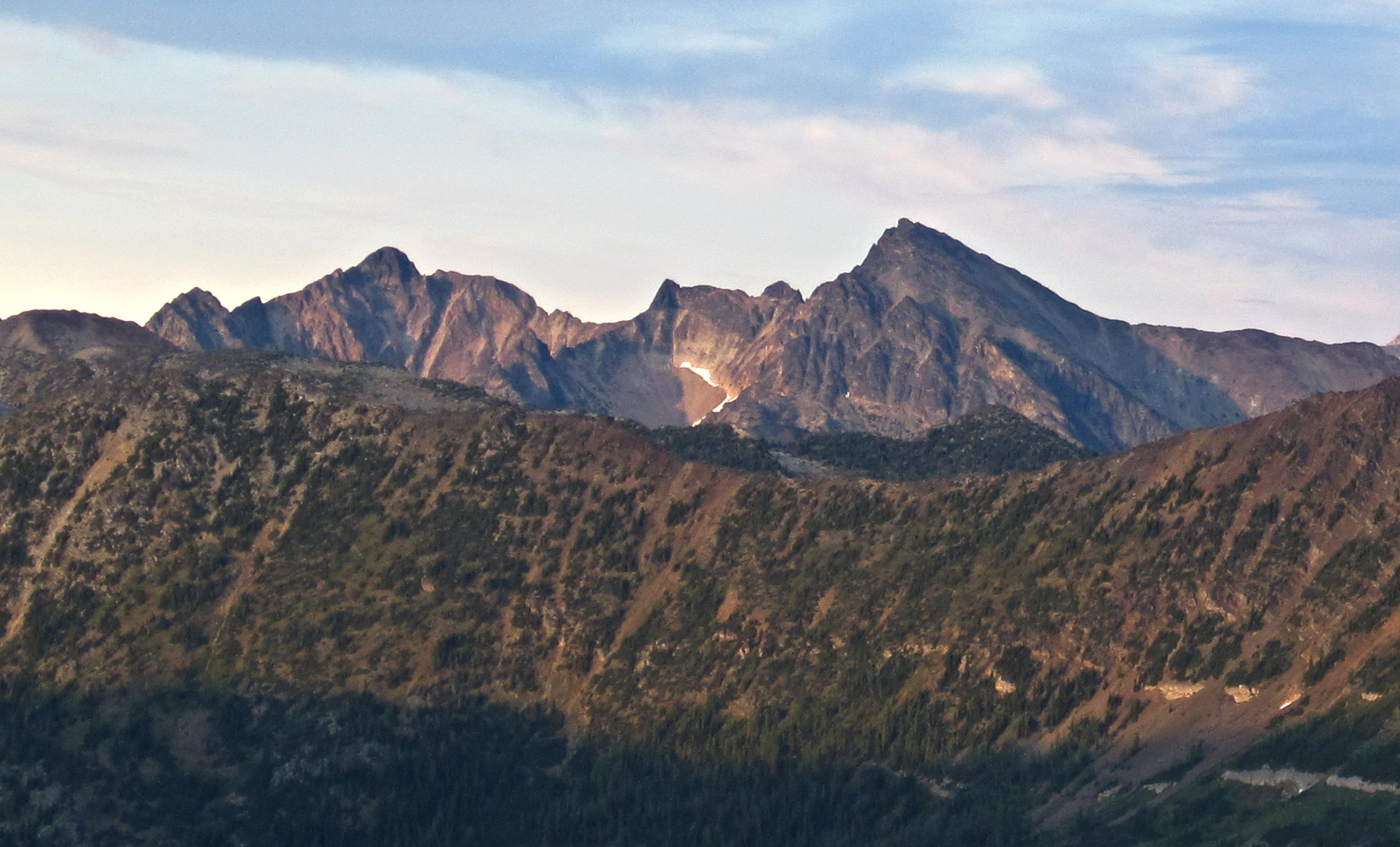
Blackcap Mountain (left) and Monument Peak from Slate Peak

== See also ==
- List of mountain peaks of Washington (state)
- Geography of the North Cascades
- Geology of the Pacific Northwest
