= Slate Peak =

Mountain in Washington (state), United States

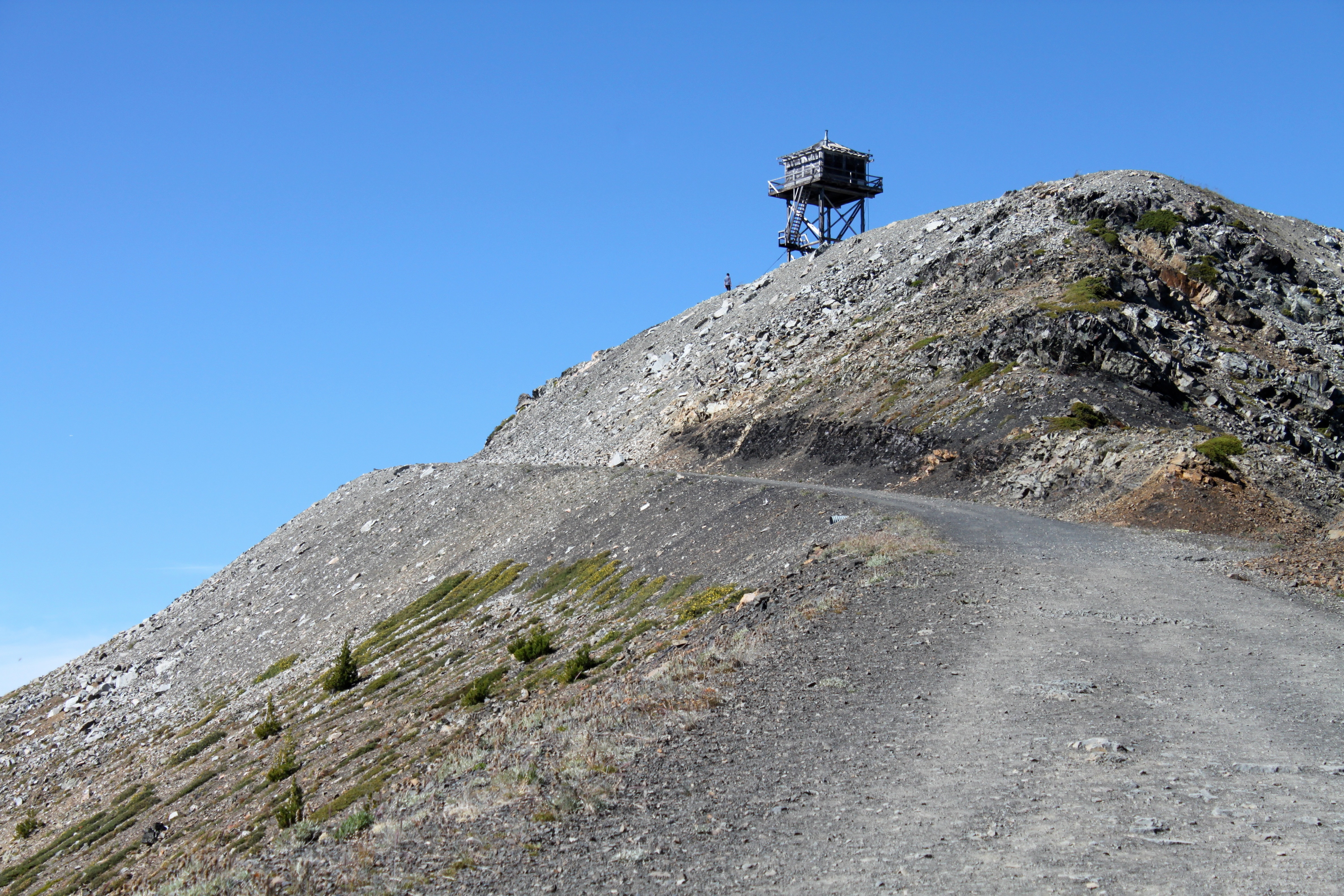
- Slate Peak

Highest point
- Elevation: 7,440 ft (2,270 m)
- Prominence: 480 ft (150 m)
- Parent peak: Pasayten Peak (7,850 ft)
- Isolation: 2.79 mi (4.49 km)
- Coordinates: 48°44′30″N 120°40′50″W

Geography
- Location within Washington (state) Location within the United States
- Interactive map of Slate Peak
- Country: United States
- State: Washington
- County: Okanogan / Whatcom
- Protected area: Pasayten Wilderness
- Parent range: Okanogan Range; North Cascades; Cascade Range
- Topo map: USGS Slate Peak

Climbing
- Easiest route: Walking

Slate Peak is a 7,440-foot (2,270-metre) mountain summit located on the shared border between Okanogan County and Whatcom County in Washington state. It is part of the Okanogan Range, which is a sub-range of the North Cascades. The mountain is situated 15 miles (24 km) northwest of Mazama, on the boundary line of the Pasayten Wilderness, on land managed by the Okanogan–Wenatchee National Forest. The peak has the distinction of having the highest road in Washington, as well as the highest fire lookout. The narrow, "white-knuckle" one-lane dirt road "hangs along a cliff wall", and is listed by media outlets as "Washington's scariest road" and "Washington's most dangerous". The road reaches the summit of the mountain, though the Forest Service gated the final few hundred yards to vehicles, which necessitates walking. Additionally, the Pacific Crest Trail traverses the west slope of the peak, and the West Fork Pasayten Trail traverses the eastern slope. The nearest higher peak is Devils Peak, 2.57 miles (4.14 km) to the north. Precipitation runoff from Slate Peak drains east into Pasayten River, or west into Slate Creek, which is in the Skagit River drainage basin.

== Slate Peak Fire Lookout ==
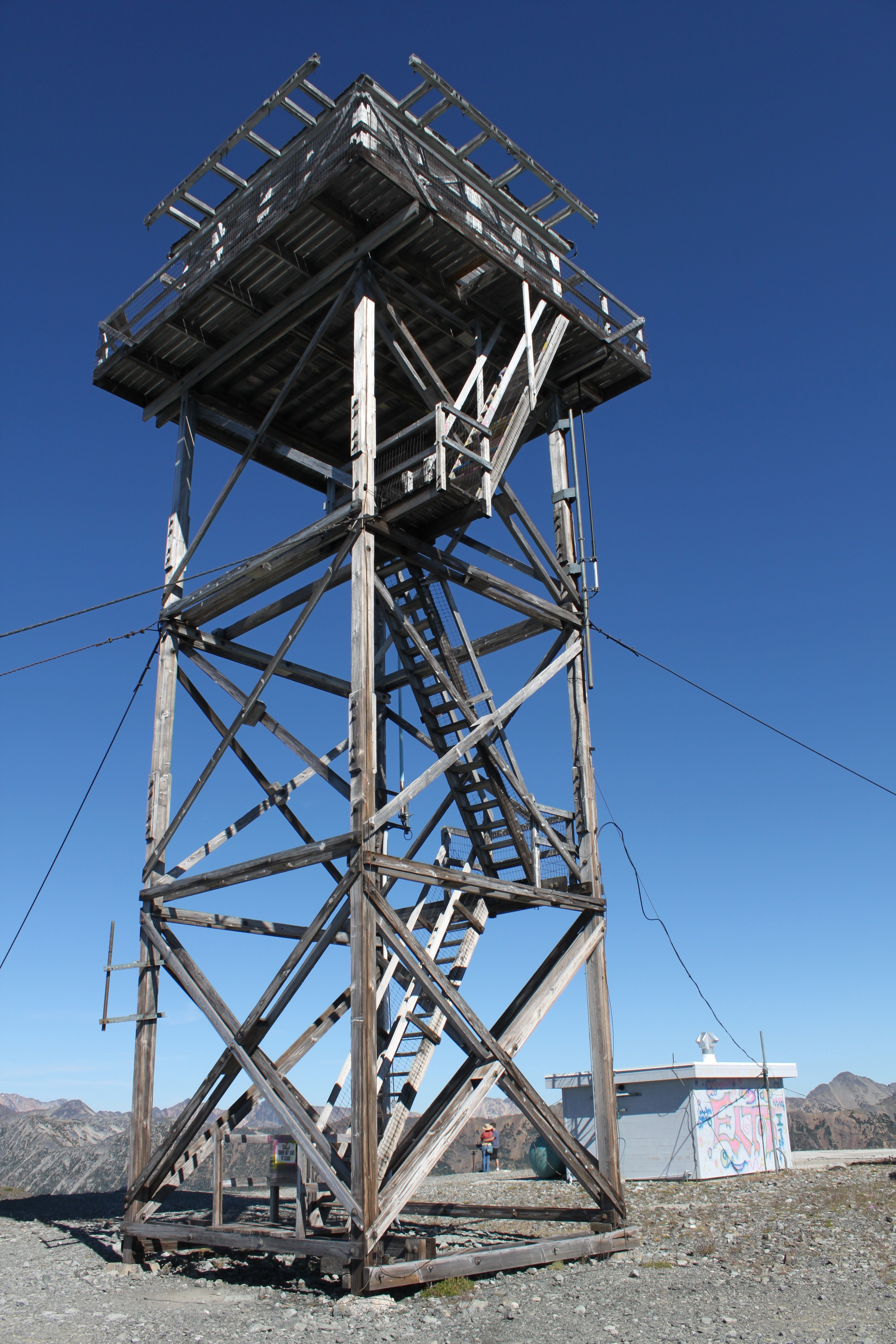

The fire lookout tower was originally constructed as a gable-roof cupola in 1924. In 1956 the Air Force leveled the mountain summit by removing 40 feet from the top of the peak (as well as the lookout) in order to install a radar station, which was never built. The lookout previously sat atop a 41-foot tall tower which was maintained for emergency use until it was discovered during the winter of 2026 that the fire lookout had collapsed. On Wednesday, March 25th 2026, the Methow Valley Chapter of the non-profit Forest Fire Lookout Association announced via their Instagram page that the Slate Peak fire lookout had collapsed at some point during the winter of 2025-2026 (it was not known when the collapse had occurred). In addition, Harts Pass Road (Forest Service Road 5400) has severe damage and will require closure by the forest service until repairs can be completed. There is no estimated time for completion and no additional information regarding the future of the Slate Peak Lookout at this time. The Slate Peak Lookout was added to the National Historic Lookout Register on November 4, 2000. On a clear day, visitors can see Silver Star Mountain and Jack Mountain, The Needles, Tower Mountain, Golden Horn, Azurite Peak, Mount Ballard, Crater Mountain, Monument Peak, Robinson Mountain, and many others from the tower.

== Climate ==
Weather fronts originating in the Pacific Ocean travel northeast toward the Cascade Mountains. As fronts approach the North Cascades, they are forced upward by the peaks of the Cascade Range (orographic lift), causing them to drop their moisture in the form of rain or snowfall onto the Cascades. As a result, the west side of the North Cascades experiences higher precipitation than the east side, especially during the winter months in the form of snowfall. During winter months, weather is usually cloudy, but due to high pressure systems over the Pacific Ocean that intensify during summer months, there is often little or no cloud cover during the summer. July through September are the best months to visit in terms of favorable weather and the Forest Service access road being open for the season; however, smoke from distant wildfires may potentially reduce visibility, and smoky summer conditions have been increasing with climate change.

== Geology ==
The North Cascades features some of the most rugged topography in the Cascade Range with craggy peaks, spires, ridges, and deep glacial valleys. Geological events occurring many years ago created the diverse topography and drastic elevation changes over the Cascade Range leading to the various climate differences.

The history of the formation of the Cascade Mountains dates back millions of years ago to the late Eocene Epoch. With the North American Plate overriding the Pacific Plate, episodes of volcanic igneous activity persisted. In addition, small fragments of the oceanic and continental lithosphere called terranes created the North Cascades about 50 million years ago.

During the Pleistocene period dating back over two million years ago, glaciation advancing and retreating repeatedly scoured the landscape leaving deposits of rock debris. The U-shaped cross section of the river valleys is a result of recent glaciation. Uplift and faulting in combination with glaciation have been the dominant processes which have created the tall peaks and deep valleys of the North Cascades area.

== Gallery ==
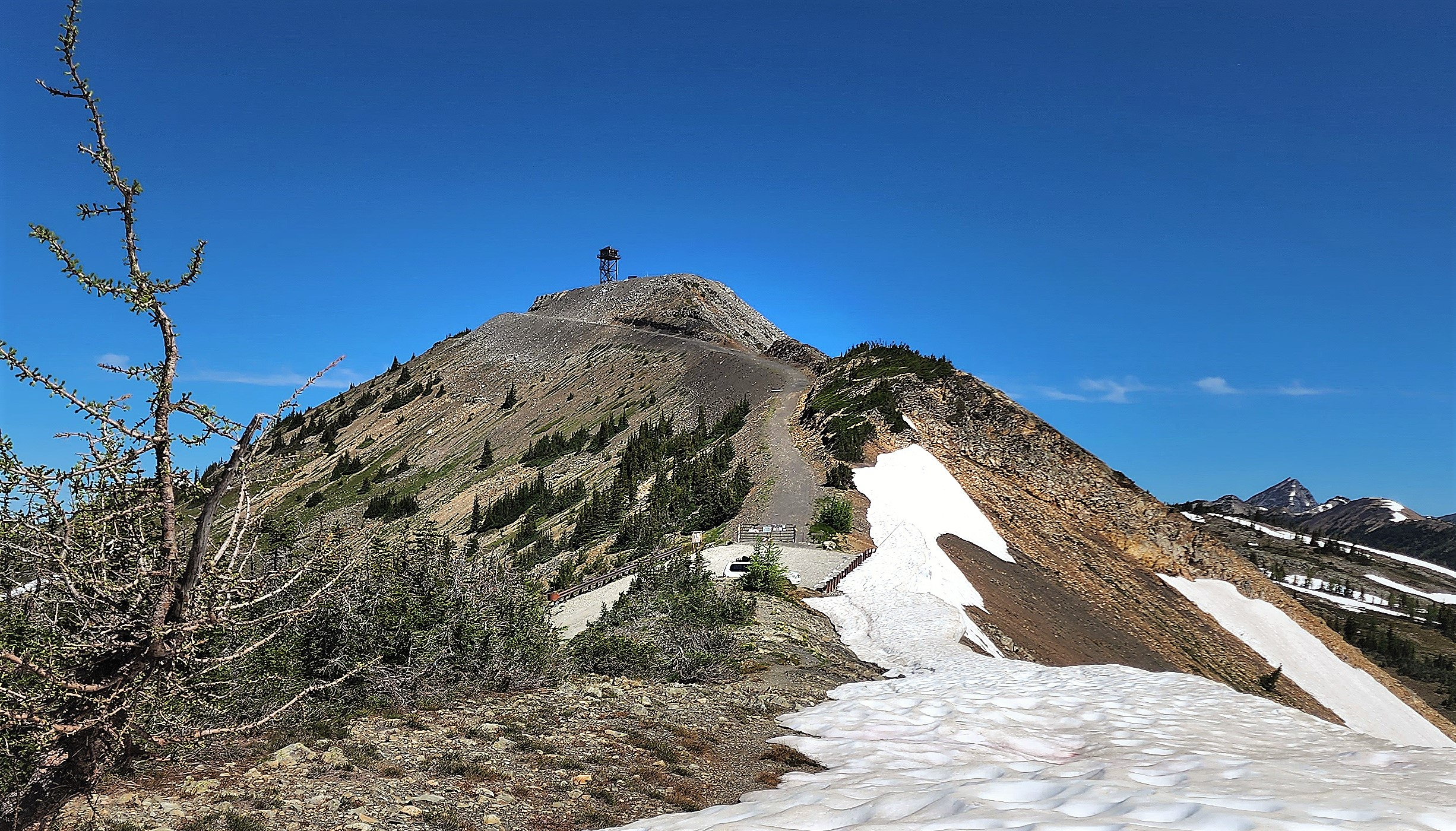
Slate Peak

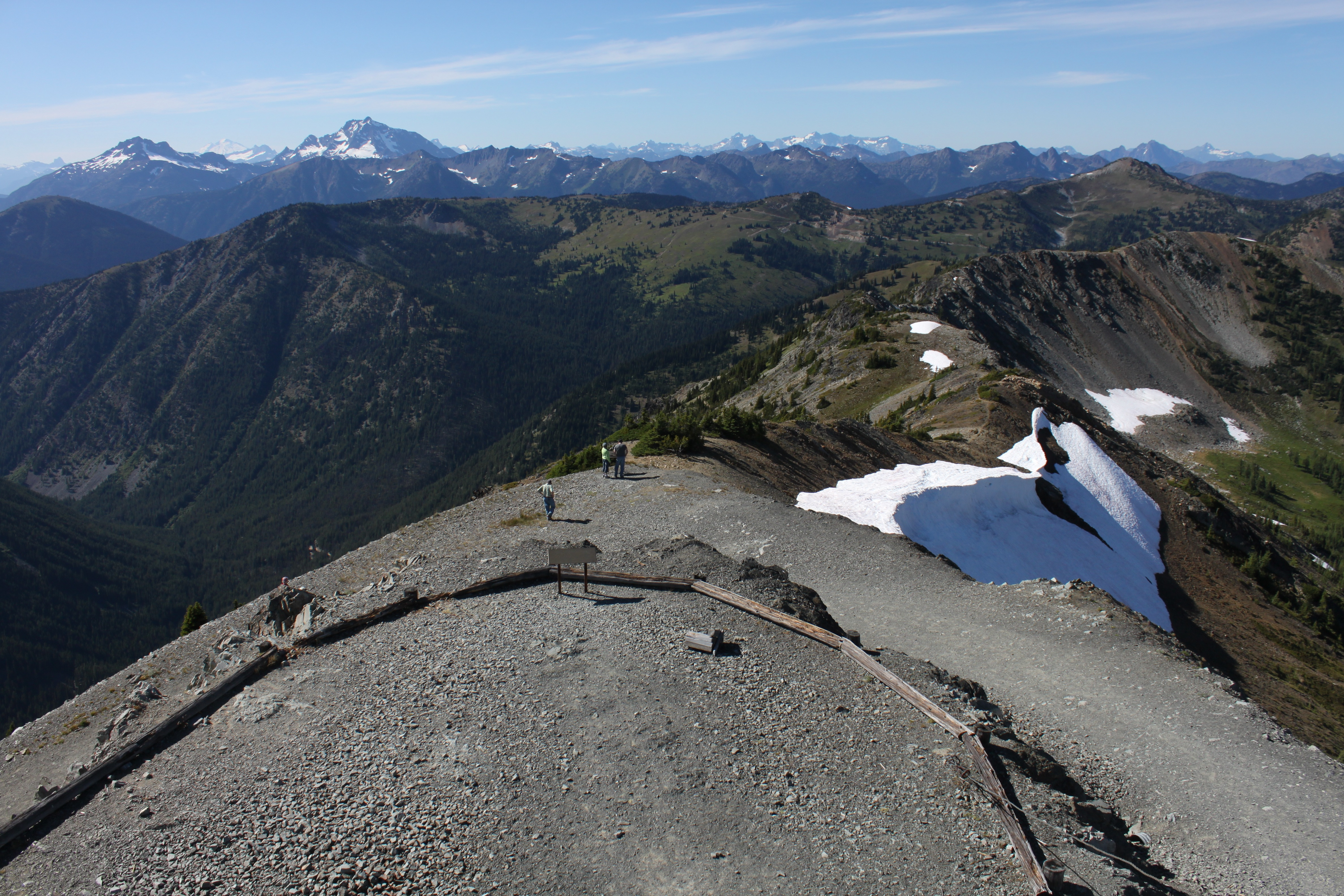
A clear view from Slate Peak's tower looking west to Jack Mountain

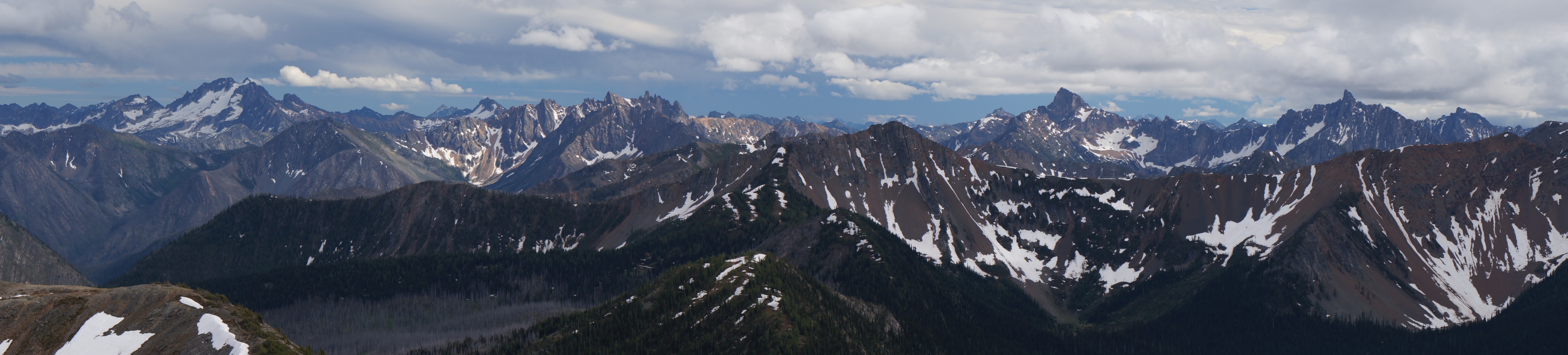
Panorama looking south from Slate Peak. Left to right: Silver Star, The Needles, Tower Mountain, Golden Horn

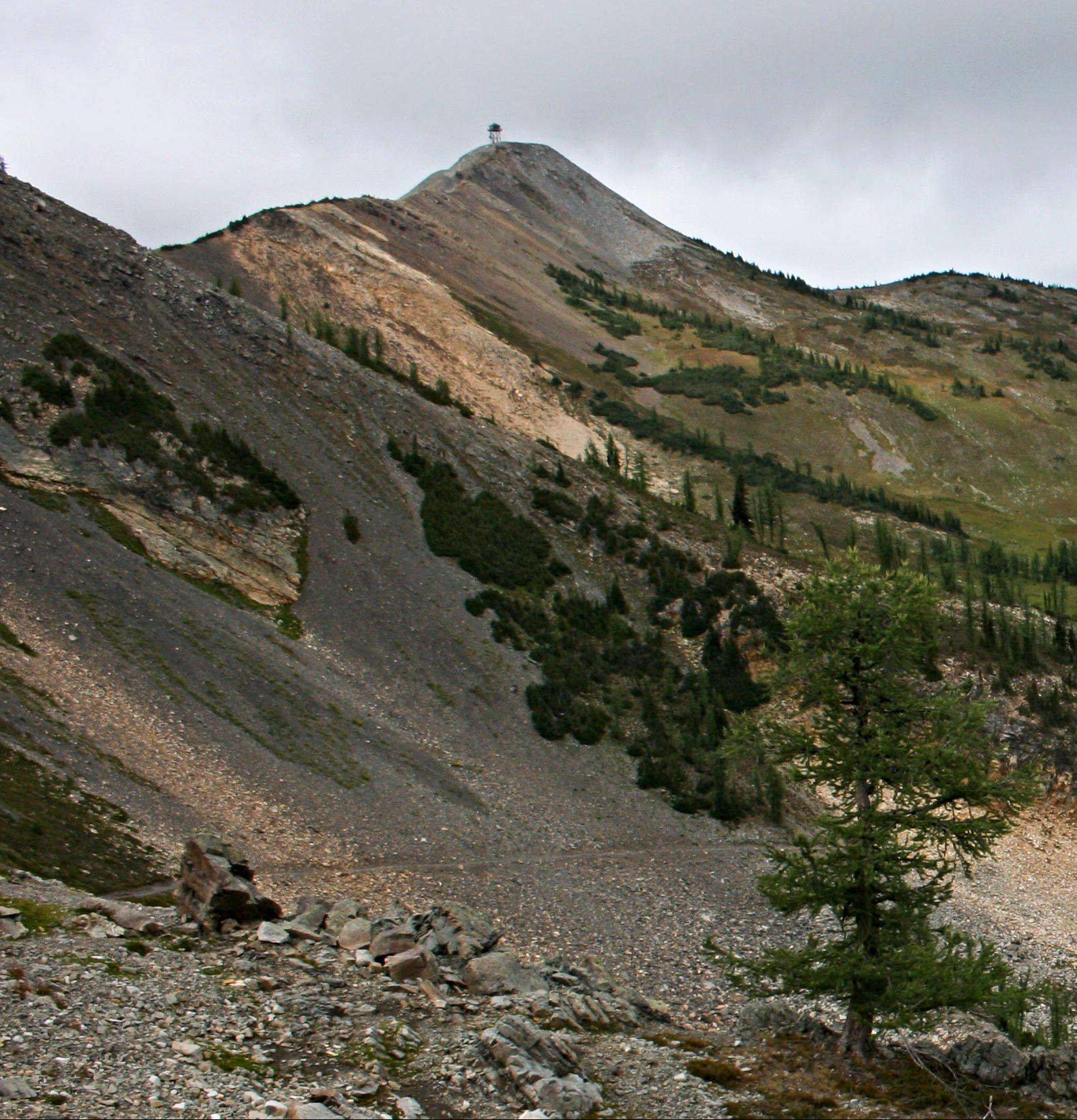
Slate Peak

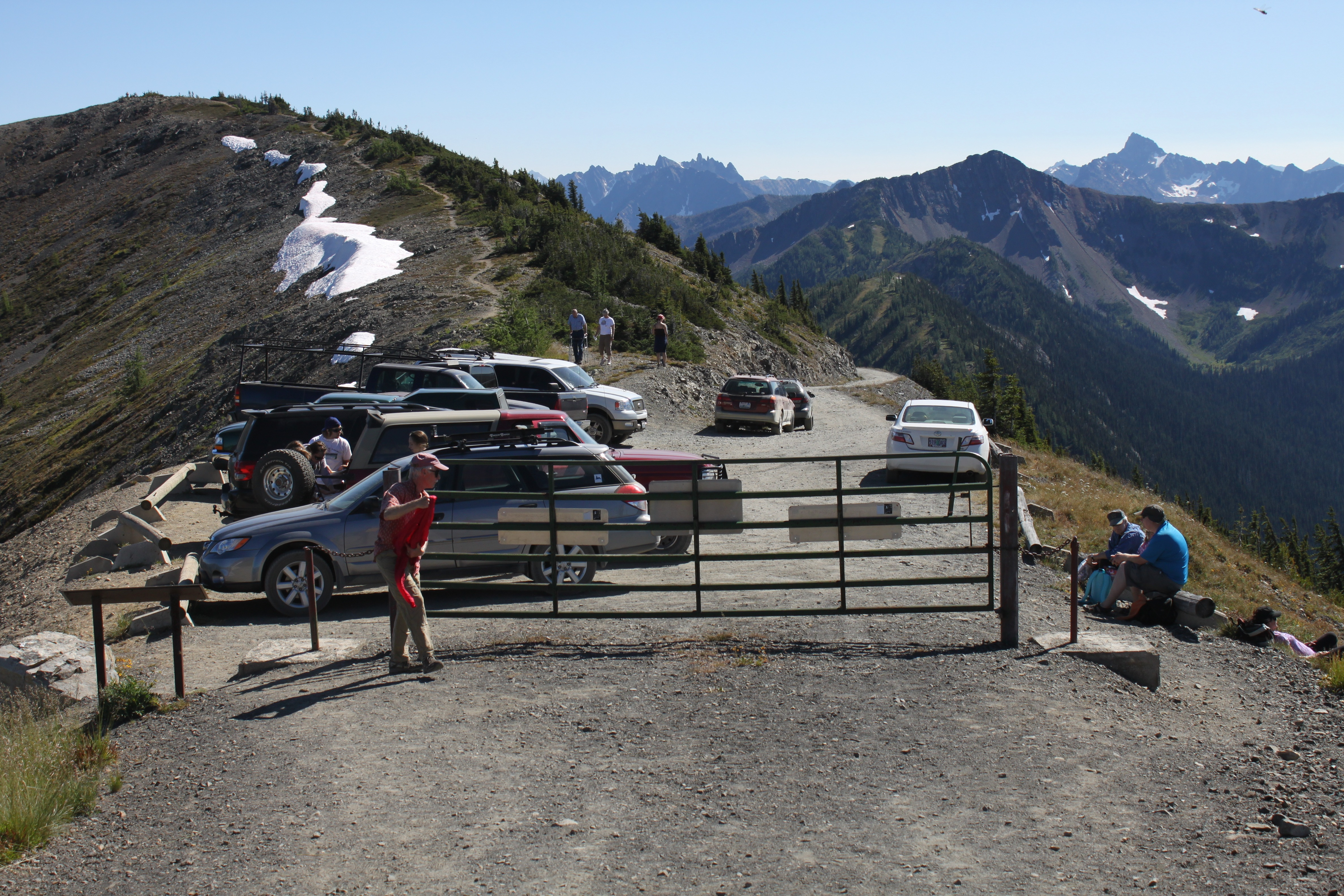
Gated road to Slate Peak

== See also ==
- Geography of the North Cascades
- Geology of the Pacific Northwest
