= The Needles (Washington) =

Mountain in Washington (state), United States

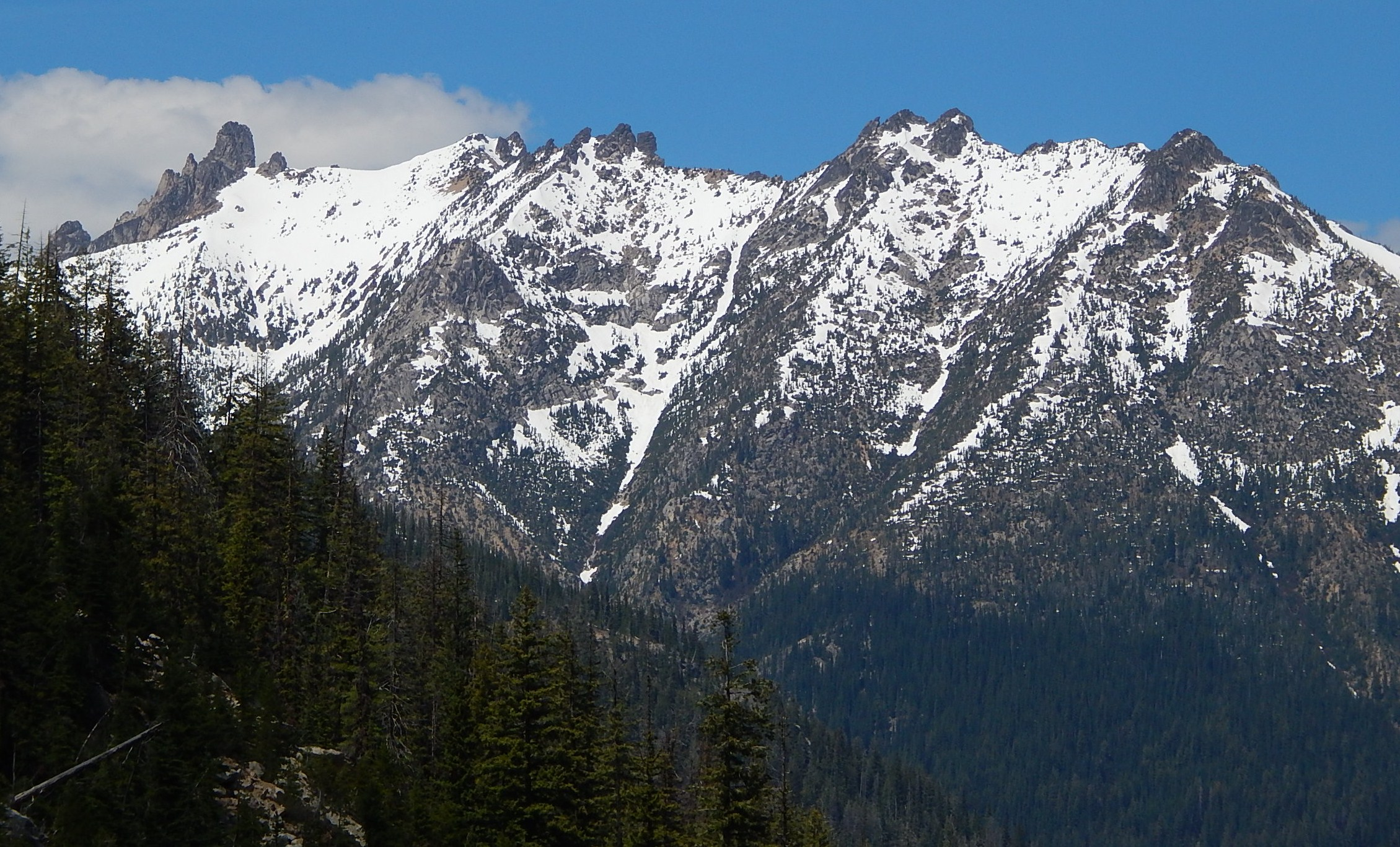
- The Needles seen from North Cascades Highway

Highest point
- Elevation: 8,160 ft (2,487 m)
- Prominence: 1,759 ft (536 m)
- Parent peak: Tower Mountain (8,444 ft)
- Isolation: 2.27 mi (3.65 km)
- Coordinates: 48°35′59″N 120°39′27″W

Geography
- Location within Washington (state) Location within the United States
- Interactive map of The Needles
- Country: United States
- State: Washington
- County: Okanogan
- Parent range: North Cascades
- Topo map: USGS Washington Pass

Climbing
- First ascent: Helmy Beckey, Larry Strathdee in 1944
- Easiest route: class 5.5 climbing

The Needles is an 8,160-foot (2,487-metre) granite mountain located in Okanogan County in Washington state. It is part of the Okanogan Range which is a sub-range of the North Cascades Range. The Needles is situated on land administered by the Okanogan–Wenatchee National Forest. Precipitation runoff from the peak drains into tributaries of the Methow River. Topographic relief is significant as the summit rises 3,660 feet (1,120 meters) above Pine Creek in approximately 1.25 mile (2 km). The nearest higher neighbor is Tower Mountain, 2.26 miles (3.64 km) to the southwest.

== Climate ==
The Needles is located in the marine west coast climate zone of western North America. Weather fronts originating in the north Pacific Ocean travel east toward the Cascade Mountains. As fronts approach the North Cascades, they are forced upward by the peaks of the Cascade Range (orographic lift), causing them to drop their moisture in the form of rain or snowfall onto the Cascades. As a result, the west side of the North Cascades experiences high precipitation, especially during the winter months in the form of snowfall. Because of maritime influence, snow tends to be wet and heavy, resulting in high avalanche danger. During winter months, weather is usually cloudy, but, due to high pressure systems over the Pacific Ocean that intensify during summer months, there is often little or no cloud cover during the summer.

== Geology ==
The North Cascades features some of the most rugged topography in the Cascade Range with craggy peaks, ridges, and deep glacial valleys. Geological events occurring many years ago created the diverse topography and drastic elevation changes over the Cascade Range leading to the various climate differences.

The history of the formation of the Cascade Mountains dates back millions of years ago to the late Eocene Epoch. With the North American Plate overriding the Pacific Plate, episodes of volcanic igneous activity persisted. In addition, small fragments of the oceanic and continental lithosphere called terranes created the North Cascades about 50 million years ago. The Needles is carved mostly from granite of the Golden Horn batholith.

During the Pleistocene period dating back over two million years ago, glaciation advancing and retreating repeatedly scoured the landscape leaving deposits of rock debris. The U-shaped cross section of the river valleys is a result of recent glaciation. Uplift and faulting in combination with glaciation have been the dominant processes which have created the tall peaks and deep valleys of the North Cascades area.

== Gallery ==
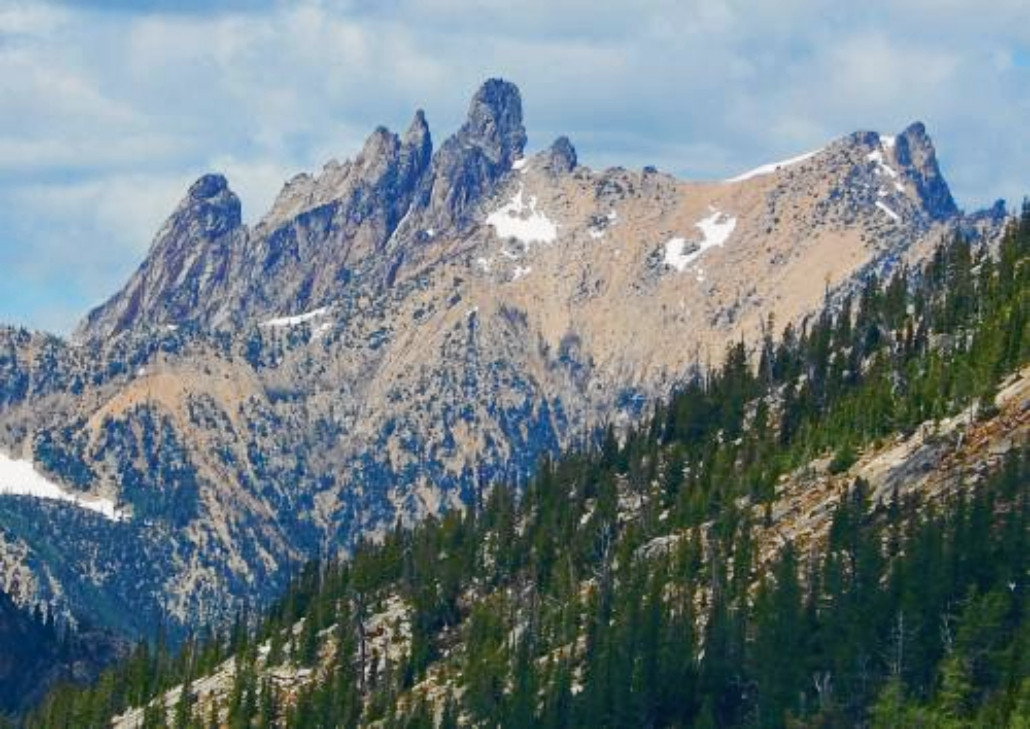
The Needles from Wallaby Peak

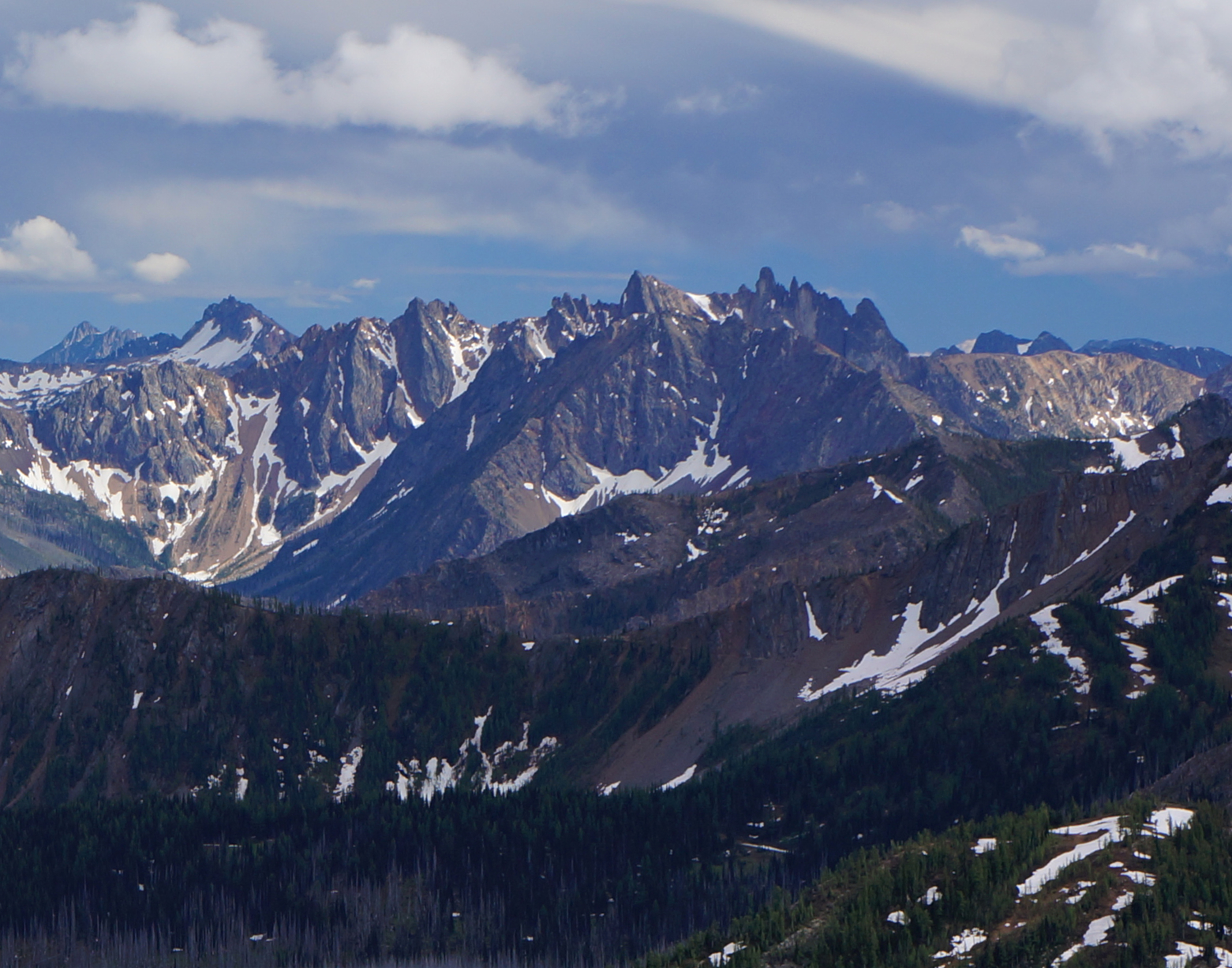
The Needles seen from Slate Peak

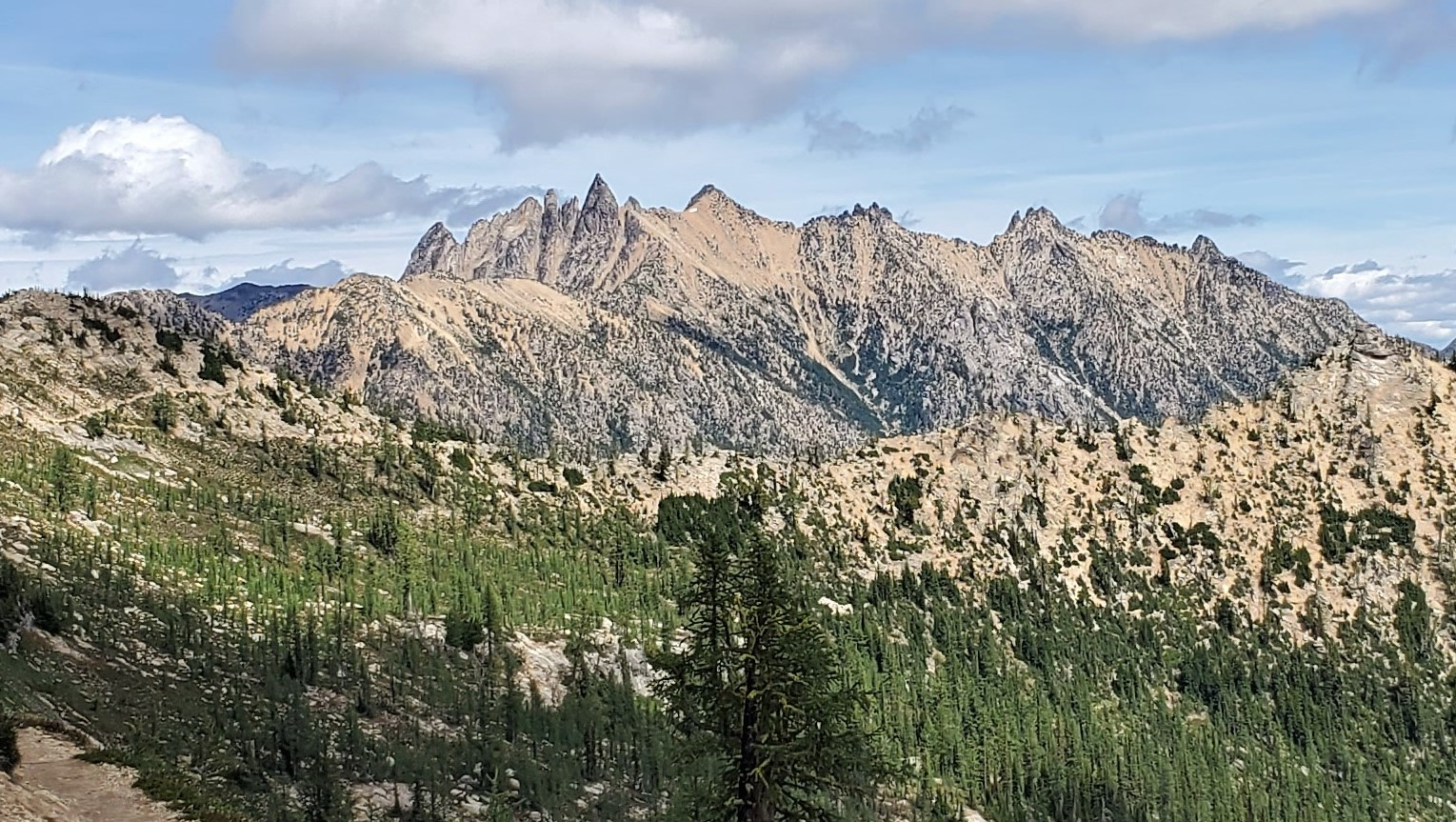
The Needles from the PCT

== See also ==
- Geography of Washington (state)
- Geology of the Pacific Northwest
- List of mountain peaks of Washington (state)
