= Robinson Mountain =

Mountain in Washington (state), United States

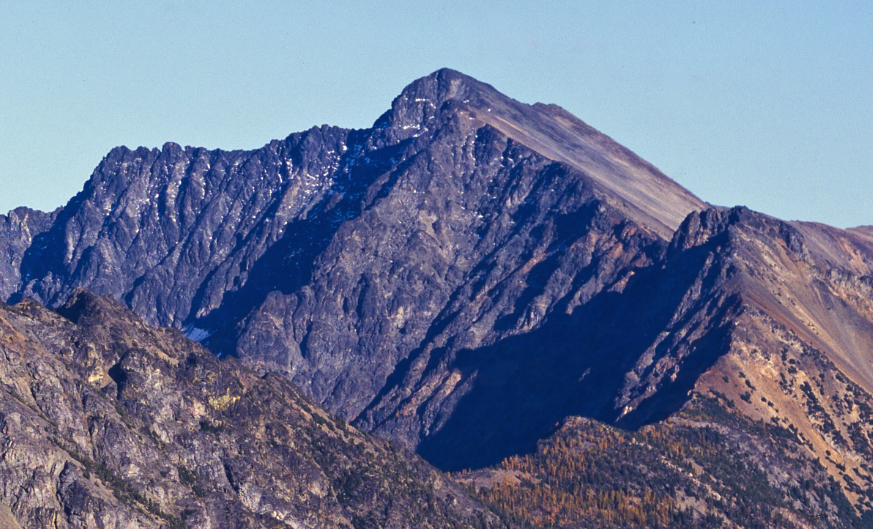
- Robinson Mountain seen from Slate Peak

Highest point
- Elevation: 8,731 ft (2,661 m) NAVD 88
- Prominence: 1,686 ft (514 m)
- Parent peak: Mount Lago
- Listing: List of Highest Mountain Peaks in Washington
- Coordinates: 48°43′36″N 120°34′30″W

Geography
- Location within Washington (state) Location within the United States
- Interactive map of Robinson Mountain
- Location: Pasayten Wilderness; Okanogan County; Washington, U.S.
- Parent range: Okanogan Range; North Cascades; Cascade Range
- Topo map: USGS Robinson Mountain

Climbing
- First ascent: 1904 by Sledge Tatum and George E. Louden, Jr.
- Easiest route: Scrambling class 3 Southeast Ridge

Robinson Mountain is an 8,731-foot (2,661-metre) mountain summit located in western Okanogan County in Washington state. It is part of the Okanogan Range which is a sub-range of the North Cascades Range. The mountain is situated in the Pasayten Wilderness, on land administered by the Okanogan–Wenatchee National Forest. The nearest higher peak is Mount Lago, 7.28 miles (11.72 km) to the north. Precipitation runoff from Robinson Mountain drains west into Robinson Creek, and east into Eureka Creek, which are both part of the Methow River drainage basin. The mountain is named for brothers James and Thomas Robinson who were settlers in the area in the late 1800s.

== Climate ==
Most weather fronts originate in the Pacific Ocean, and travel northeast toward the Cascade Mountains. As fronts approach the North Cascades, they are forced upward by the peaks of the Cascade Range, causing them to drop their moisture in the form of rain or snowfall onto the Cascades (Orographic lift). As a result, the west side of the North Cascades experiences higher precipitation than the east side, especially during the winter months in the form of snowfall. During winter months, weather is usually cloudy, but, due to high pressure systems over the Pacific Ocean that intensify during summer months, there is often little or no cloud cover during the summer.

Climate data for Robinson Mountain 48.7247 N, 120.5757 W, Elevation: 8,209 ft (2,502 m) (1991–2020 normals)
Month	Jan	Feb	Mar	Apr	May	Jun	Jul	Aug	Sep	Oct	Nov	Dec	Year
Mean daily maximum °F (°C)	22.5 (−5.3)	22.8 (−5.1)	25.7 (−3.5)	33.2 (0.7)	42.4 (5.8)	48.7 (9.3)	59.1 (15.1)	59.8 (15.4)	52.8 (11.6)	40.8 (4.9)	25.8 (−3.4)	21.0 (−6.1)	37.9 (3.3)
Daily mean °F (°C)	17.3 (−8.2)	17.0 (−8.3)	19.1 (−7.2)	24.9 (−3.9)	33.5 (0.8)	39.5 (4.2)	48.8 (9.3)	48.9 (9.4)	42.4 (5.8)	32.1 (0.1)	20.6 (−6.3)	15.9 (−8.9)	30.0 (−1.1)
Mean daily minimum °F (°C)	12.0 (−11.1)	11.3 (−11.5)	12.5 (−10.8)	16.6 (−8.6)	24.7 (−4.1)	30.2 (−1.0)	38.4 (3.6)	37.9 (3.3)	31.9 (−0.1)	23.4 (−4.8)	15.5 (−9.2)	10.9 (−11.7)	22.1 (−5.5)
Average precipitation inches (mm)	8.82 (224)	6.33 (161)	6.65 (169)	3.50 (89)	2.64 (67)	2.28 (58)	1.17 (30)	1.15 (29)	2.21 (56)	4.81 (122)	8.89 (226)	8.43 (214)	56.88 (1,445)
Source: PRISM Climate Group

== Geology ==
The North Cascades features some of the most rugged topography in the Cascade Range with craggy peaks, spires, ridges, and deep glacial valleys. Geological events occurring many years ago created the diverse topography and drastic elevation changes over the Cascade Range leading to the various climate differences.

The history of the formation of the Cascade Mountains dates back millions of years ago to the late Eocene Epoch. With the North American Plate overriding the Pacific Plate, episodes of volcanic igneous activity persisted. In addition, small fragments of the oceanic and continental lithosphere called terranes created the North Cascades about 50 million years ago.

During the Pleistocene period dating back over two million years ago, glaciation advancing and retreating repeatedly scoured the landscape leaving deposits of rock debris. The U-shaped cross section of the river valleys is a result of recent glaciation. Uplift and faulting in combination with glaciation have been the dominant processes which have created the tall peaks and deep valleys of the North Cascades area.

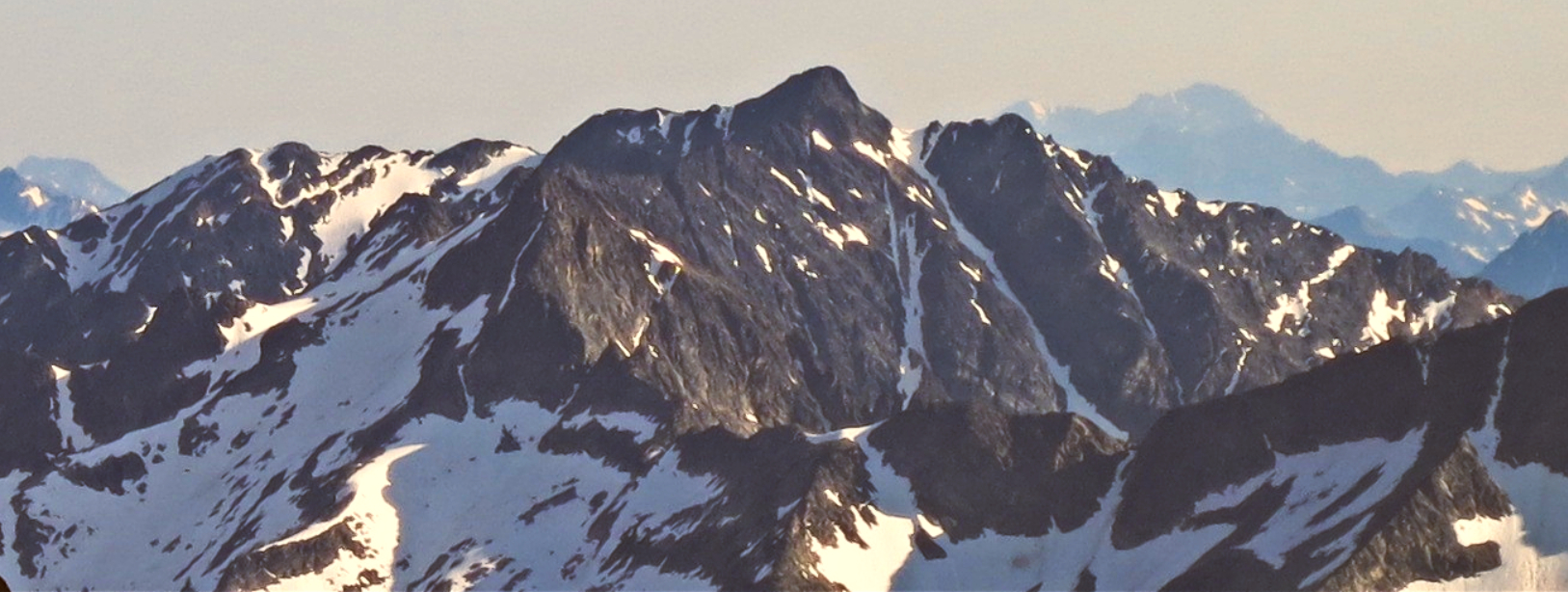
Robinson Mountain from the north

== See also ==
- List of mountain peaks of Washington (state)
- Geography of the North Cascades
- Geology of the Pacific Northwest
