= Rainy Lake Falls =

Waterfall in Washington (state), United States

- Interactive map of Rainy Lake Falls
- Location: North Cascades National Park, Chelan County, Washington, United States
- Coordinates: 48.4969°N 120.7458°W
- Type: Tiered
- Total height: 850 feet (260 m)
- Number of drops: 3
- Total width: 80 feet (24 m)
- Watercourse: Unnamed

Rainy Lake Falls is a waterfall on the inlet stream of namesake Rainy Lake in Chelan County, Washington. The stream heads in a pair of small lakes and the remaining portions of the Lyall Glacier, and flows down a cascade that is said to be approximately 850 feet (260 m) high.

The falls drop over several tall rock steps, with a largest single drop of 300 feet (91 m). Each of its three tiers is about 80 feet (24 m) wide. A steep talus cascade is also found at the foot of the falls. Rainy Lake's outlet stream eventually flows into the Stehekin River.

The drainage area of Rainy Lake Falls is very small, but its sources allow it to retain water all year long, with best flows from May through August. It is located alongside the North Cascades Highway.

== See also ==
- List of waterfalls
