= Geography of the North Cascades =

The geography of the North Cascades describes a range of rugged mountains in British Columbia, Canada and Washington, United States. In Canada, the range is officially named the Cascade Mountains but is commonly referred to as the Canadian Cascades.

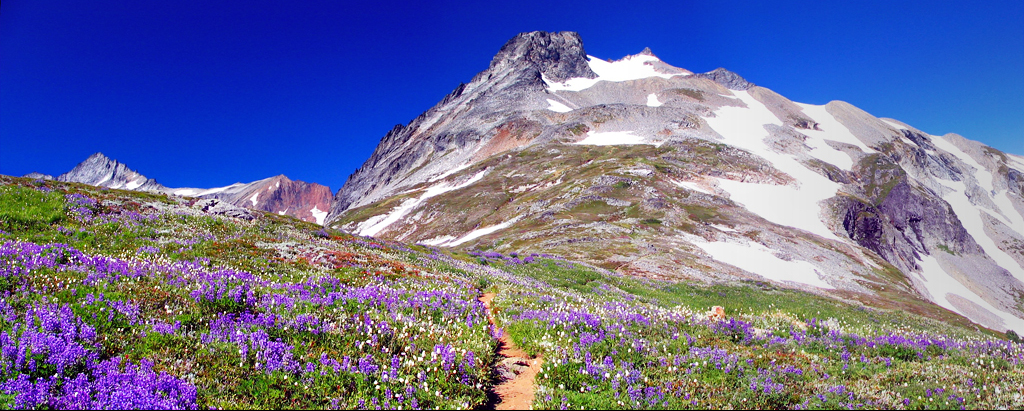
Sahale Peak

== Extent ==
The Fraser River and Similkameen River in British Columbia form the northern boundary of the North Cascades. On the east, the Okanogan River and the Columbia River bound the range. On the west within the United States, the foothills of the range are separated by a narrow coastal plain from Puget Sound, whereas in Canada there are few if any foothills and the range drops steeply to the floodplain of the Fraser Lowland.

The southern boundary of the North Cascades is less definite. For the purposes of this article, it will be taken as US Highway 2, running over Stevens Pass, or equivalently, the Skykomish River, Nason Creek, and the lower Wenatchee River. This roughly follows Beckey's division. Sometimes the southern boundary is defined by Snoqualmie Pass and the approximate route of Interstate 90.

== Subranges ==
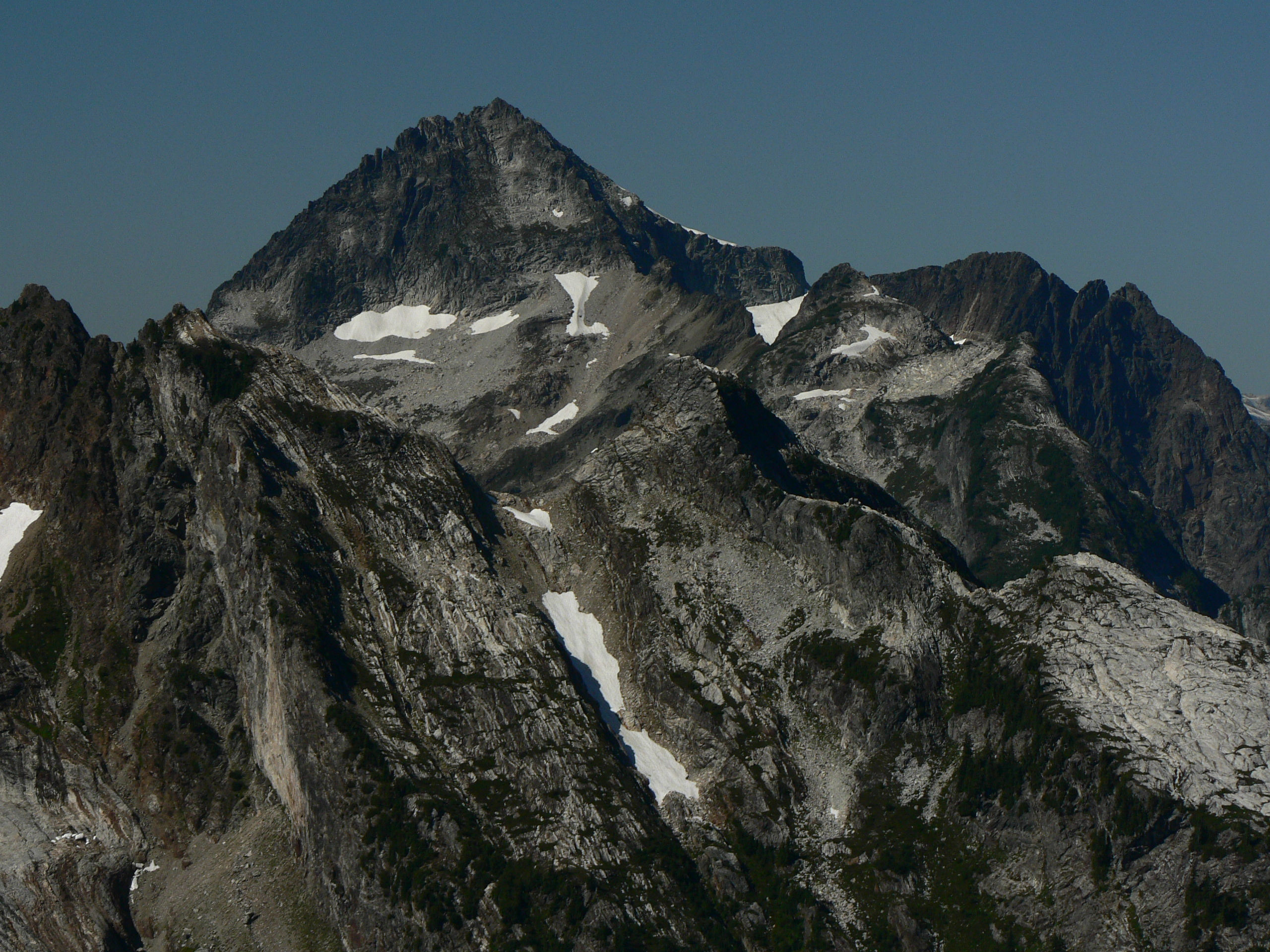
Mount Despair, located within North Cascades National Park

There are various formally named subranges, and some informally named ones. Formally named subranges include the:

- Okanagan Range
- Hozameen Range
  - Bedded Range
- Skagit Range
  - Cheam Range ("Four Brothers")
- Picket Range

Informally named ranges include the Coquihalla Range, which lies between the Coquihalla River and the Fraser Canyon south of an imaginary line roughly connecting Coquihalla Pass with the town of Boston Bar. The Coquihalla Range includes a group of horn-like summits known as the Anderson River Group, also known as the Llamoid Group due to conferred names such as Vicuna Peak, Yak Peak, Guanaco Peak, etc.

== Protected areas ==
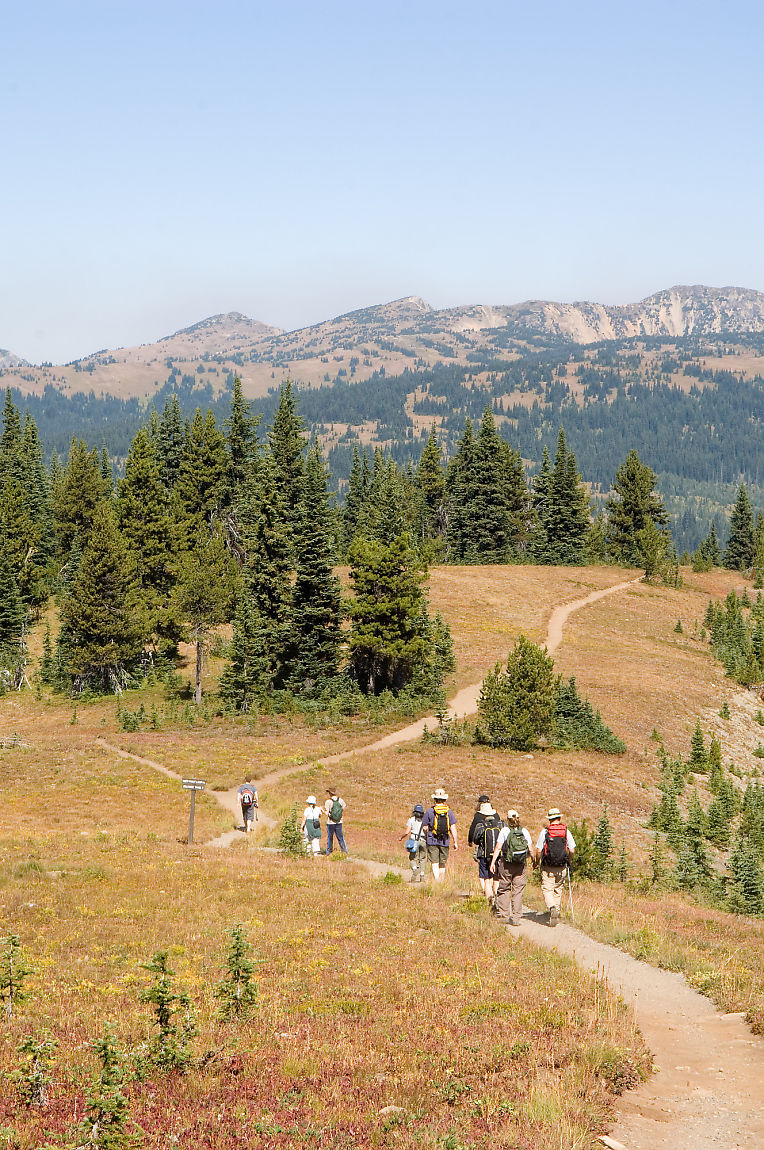
A group of hikers in E.C. Manning Provincial Park.

The North Cascades include various protected areas. Chief among the areas in Washington is North Cascades National Park, occupying much of the area between Mount Baker and the Cascade divide. Contiguous with the Park are Ross Lake National Recreation Area and Lake Chelan National Recreation Area. Designated wilderness areas in the range include:

- Mount Baker Wilderness
- Glacier Peak Wilderness
- Boulder River Wilderness
- Henry M. Jackson Wilderness,
- Lake Chelan-Sawtooth Wilderness
- Noisy-Diobsud Wilderness
- Pasayten Wilderness
- Stephen Mather Wilderness
- Wild Sky Wilderness

In British Columbia, protected areas include

- Skagit Valley Provincial Park
- E.C. Manning Provincial Park
- Cascade Recreation Area
- Cathedral Provincial Park
- Coquihalla Canyon Provincial Park

== Notable peaks ==
The following North Cascades peaks are notable for their height (absolute elevation):

Mountain	Height		Coordinates	Prominence		Parent mountain	First ascent
	(ft)	(m)		(ft)	(m)		
Mount Baker	10,778	3,285	48°46′N 121°48′W	8,881	2,707	Mount Rainier	1868 by Edmund T. Coleman and party
Glacier Peak	10,541	3,213	48°6′45.05″N 121°6′49.70″W	7,501	2,286	Mount Rainier	1898 by Thomas Gerdine
Bonanza Peak	9,511	2,899	48°14′16″N 120°51′58″W	3,711	1,131	Glacier Peak	1937 by Curtis James, Barrie James, Joe Leuthold
Mount Fernow	9,249	2,819	48°09′44″N 120°48′30″W	2,809	856	Bonanza Peak	1932 by Oscar Pennington, Hermann Ulrichs
Goode Mountain	9,220	2,810	48°28′58″N 120°54′39″W	3,800	1,200	Bonanza Peak	1936 by Wolf Bauer, Philip Dickett, Joe Halwax, Jack Hossack, George MacGowan

(The above table uses a topographic prominence cutoff of 1,000 feet (300 m), in order to list only highly independent peaks.)

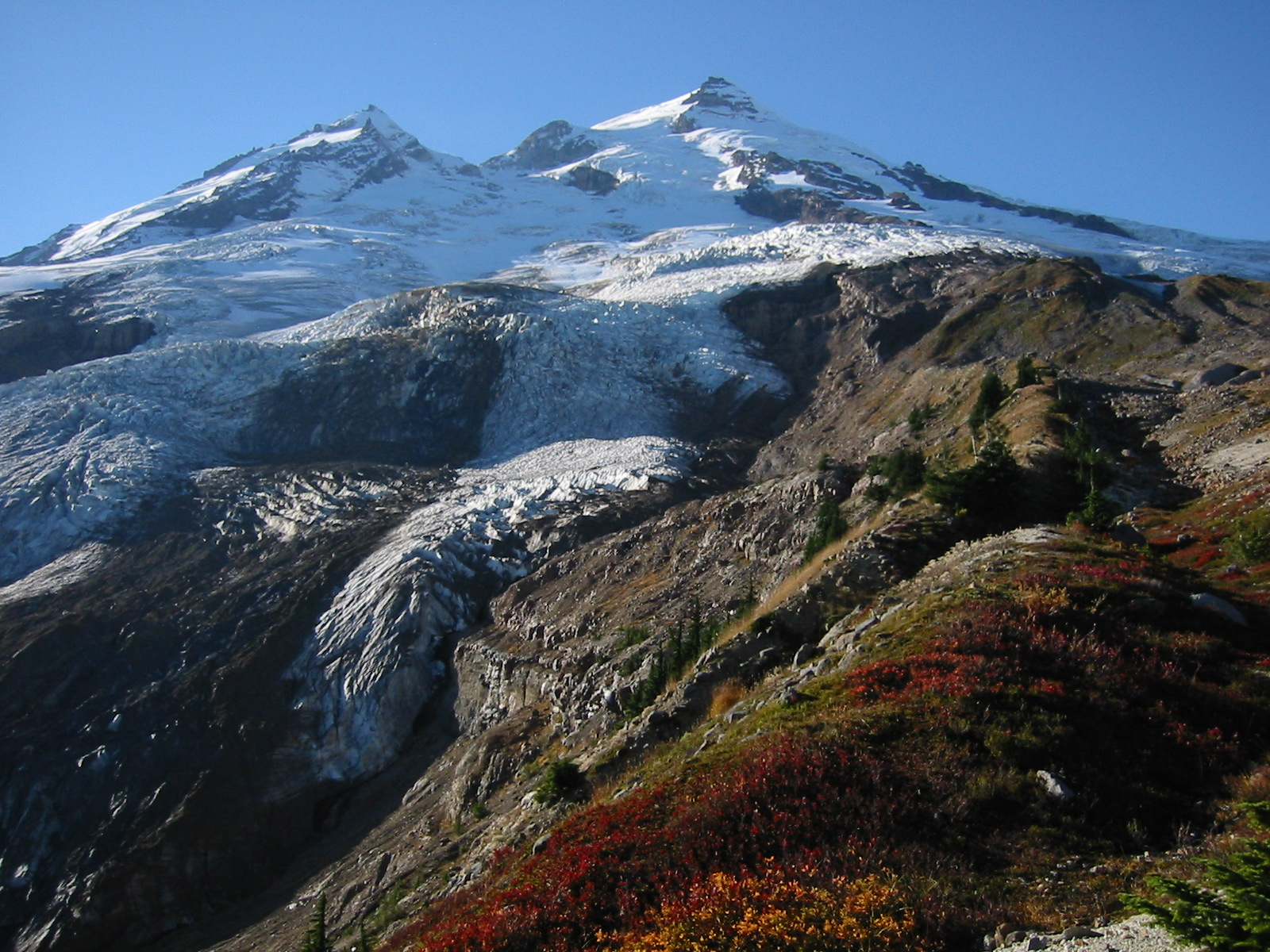
Mount Baker with Boulder Glacier in foreground.

The following peaks are notable for their topographic prominence:

Mountain	Height		Prominence		Parent mountain
	(ft)	(m)	(ft)	(m)	
Mount Baker	10,778	3,285	8,881	2,707	Mount Rainier
Glacier Peak	10,541	3,213	7,501	2,286	Mount Rainier
Round Mountain	5,320	1,620	4,780	1,460	Mount Baker
Mount Spickard	8,979	2,737	4,779	1,457	Mount Baker
Welch Peak	7,976	2,431	4,728	1,441	Robinson Mountain
Three Fingers	6,850	2,090	4,490	1,370	Glacier Peak
Mount Shuksan	9,131	2,783	4,411	1,344	Mount Baker
Remmel Mountain	8,684	2,647	4,370	1,330	Mount Lago
Mount Prophet	7,650	2,330	4,080	1,240	Three Fingers
Mount Outram	8,074	2,461	3,678	1,121	Hozomeen Mountain
Mount Lago	8,743	2,665	3,300	1,000	Silver Star Mountain

The following peaks are notable for their large, steep rise above local terrain. Peaks are listed in descending order by elevation.

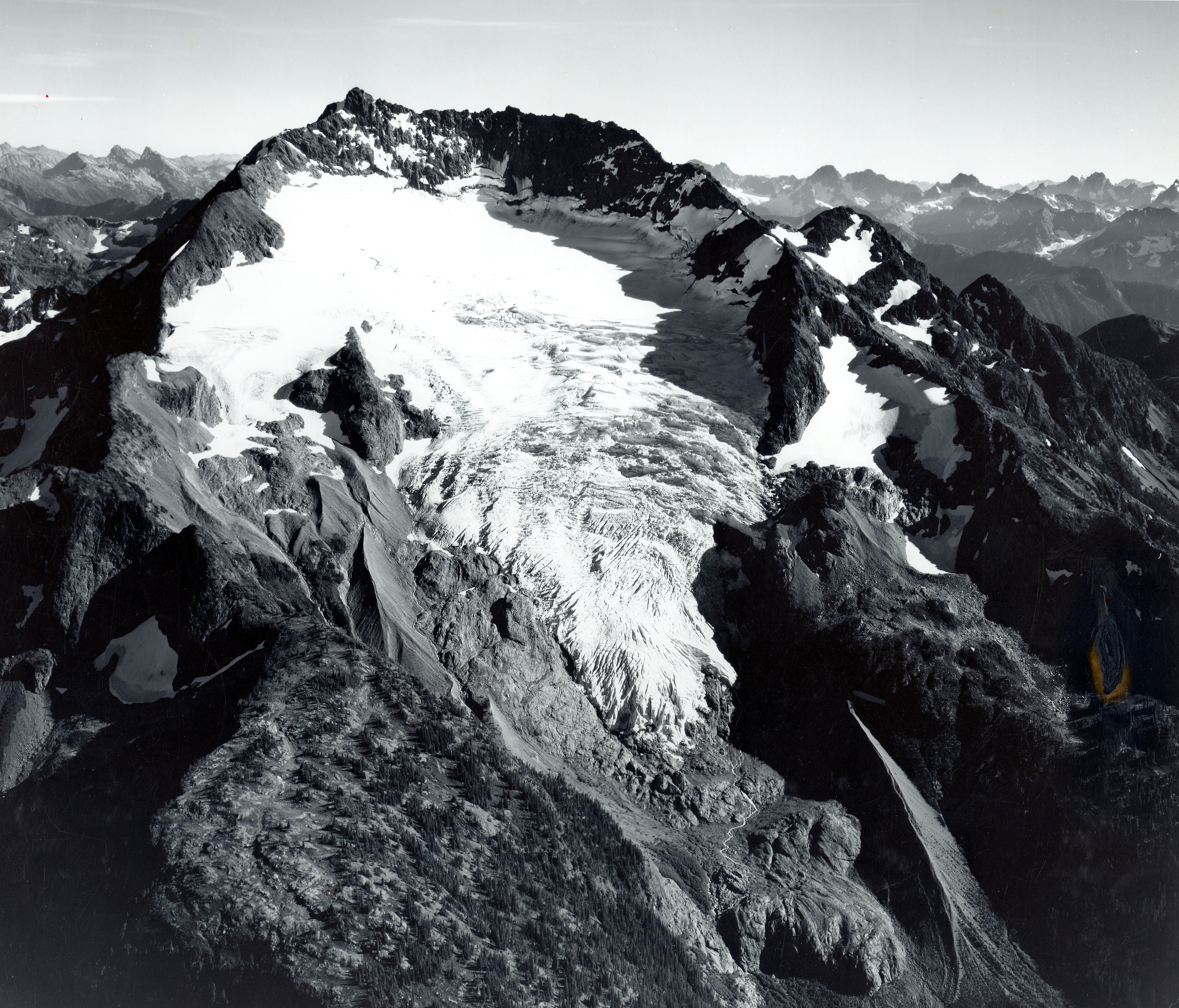
Jack Mountain

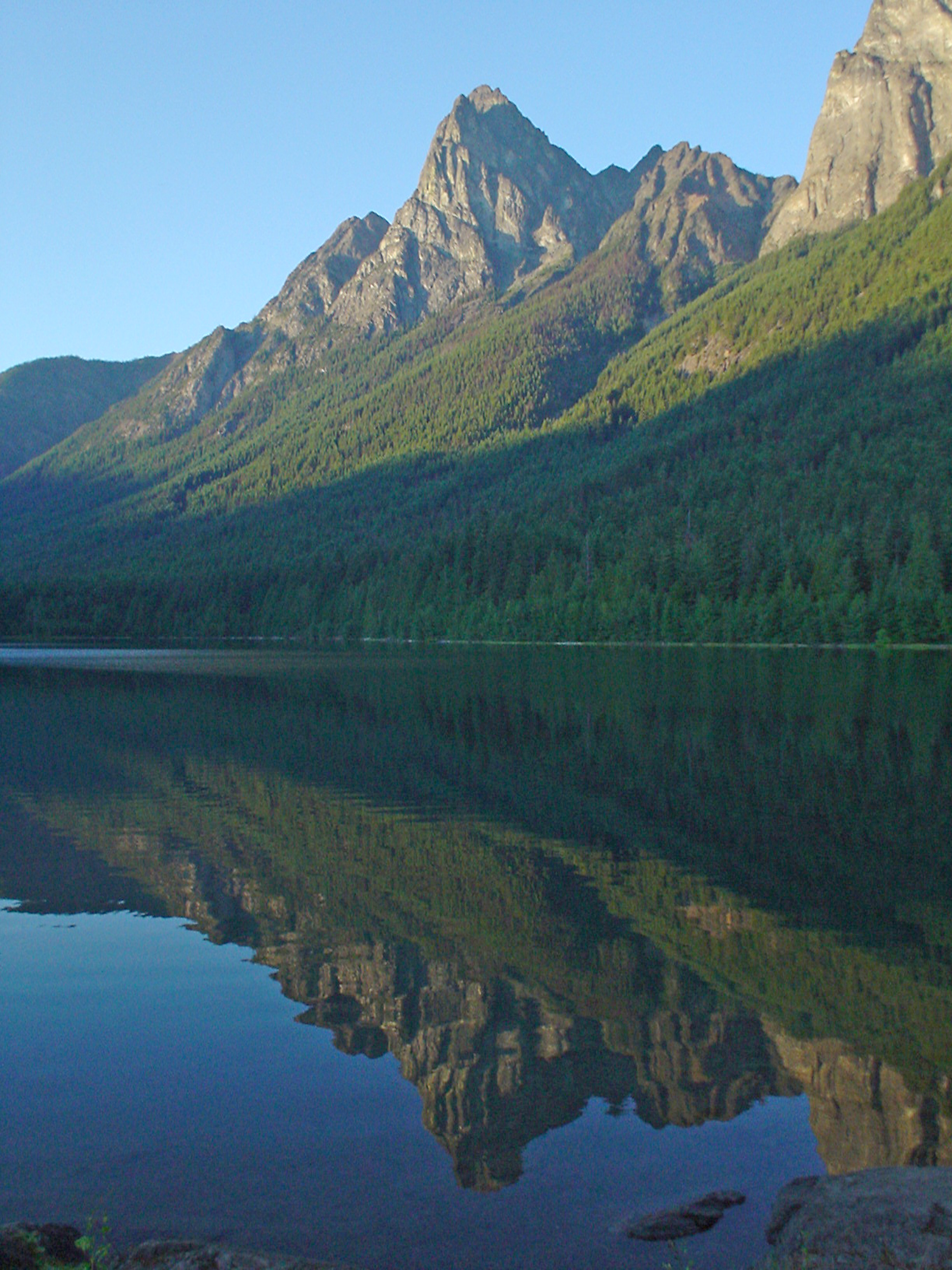
Hozomeen Mountain from Hozomeen Lake

Mountain	Height	
	(ft)	(m)
Mount Baker	10,778	3,285
Glacier Peak	10,541	3,213
Goode Mountain	9,220	2,810
Mount Shuksan	9,127	2,782
Jack Mountain	9,066	2,763
North Gardner Mountain	8,956	2,730
Mount Redoubt	8,956	2,730
Eldorado Peak	8,876	2,705
Luna Peak	8,311	2,533
Johannesburg Mountain	8,220	2,510
Agnes Mountain	8,115	2,473
Hozomeen Mountain	8,066	2,459
Slesse Mountain	8,002	2,439
American Border Peak	7,994	2,437
Mount Blum	7,680	2,340
Sloan Peak	7,835	2,388
Colonial Peak	7,771	2,369
Mount Triumph	7,270	2,220
Pugh Mountain	7,201	2,195
Davis Peak	7,051	2,149
Whitehorse Mountain	6,850	2,090
Baring Mountain	6,125	1,867

== Highest waterfalls ==
The North Cascades are known for having many extremely tall glacial-fed waterfalls; the ten highest measured waterfalls are listed.

Waterfall	Height		Stream	Location	Coordinates
	(ft)	(m)			
Colonial Creek Falls	2,584	788	Colonial Creek	Diablo Lake	48°40′13″N 121°08′26″W
Johannesburg Falls	2,465	751	Unnamed	Below Johannesburg Peak, near Mount Torment	48°28′36″N 121°05′29″W
Sulphide Creek Falls	2,182	665	Sulphide Creek	Eastern boundary of North Cascades National Park	48°47′47″N 121°34′32″W
Silver Lake Falls	2,128	649	Silver Creek	Near Mount Spickard in North Cascades National Park	48°59′21″N 121°13′22″W
Blum Basin Falls	1,680	510	Blum Creek	Below Mount Blum	48°44′01″N 121°30′09″W
Boston Creek Falls	1,627	496	Boston Creek	Near North Fork Cascade River	48°29′35″N 121°04′32″W
Torment Falls	1,583	482	Torment Creek	Near North Fork Cascade River	48°29′50″N 121°06′22″W
Green Lake Falls	979	298	Unnamed fork of Bacon Creek	Near Green Lake in North Cascades National Park	48°41′34″N 121°29′34″W
Depot Creek Falls	967	295	Depot Creek	Near Mount Redoubt, North Cascades National Park	48°58′38″N 121°17′05″W
Rainy Lake Falls	800	240	Unnamed	Rainy Lake, Okanogan–Wenatchee National Forest	48°29′49″N 120°44′45″W

Many tall waterfalls occur where meltwater from mountain glaciers drop down a headwall, which are common occurrences in the North Cascades. Many waterfalls, despite their great height, are non-notable as they are not clearly visible and often have low volume. Seahpo Peak Falls, despite its great height at nearly 2,200 feet (670 m), is an example of one of these waterfalls. A few notable exceptions do occur; Sulphide Creek Falls occurs where meltwaters from two of the largest Mount Shuksan glaciers are forced through a narrow chute over a 2,183-foot (665 m) headwall at the head of Sulphide Valley.

== Features ==
Geographical features in the area of the North Cascades National Park can be found in this image map:

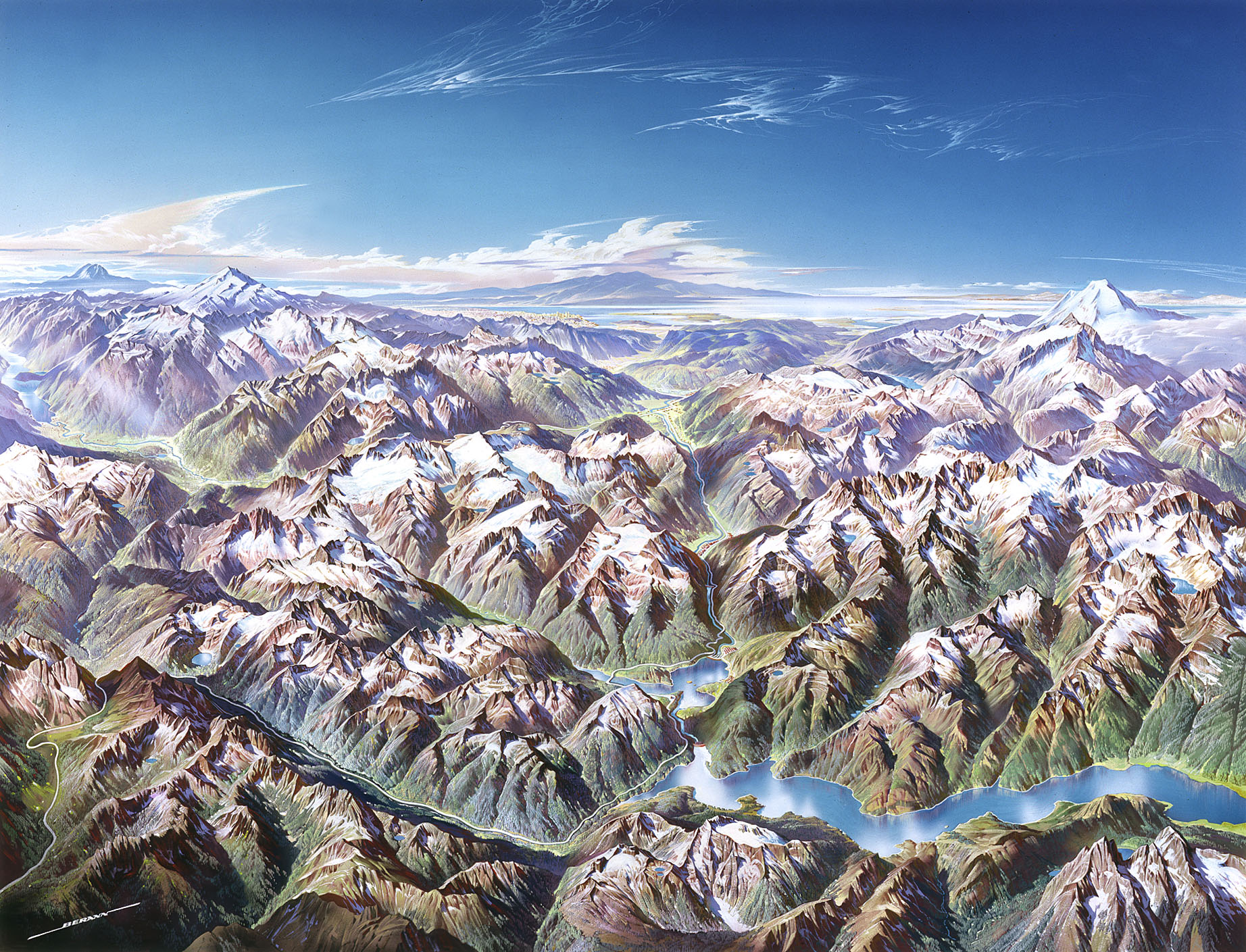
Painting of North Cascades Nat'l Park by Heinrich C. Berann. Aerial view of the entire park from the east, looking west. Ross Lake is in the foreground, drained by the Skagit River flowing toward Puget Sound and the Strait of Juan de Fuca in the background. Mount Baker is prominently visible on the upper right with Glacier Peak and Mount Rainier the prominent peaks in the upper left background and the Olympic Mountains the dark massif in the background of the upper centre. Mouse over the picture and click on an area of interest.
