= Mount Lago =

Mountain in Washington (state), United States

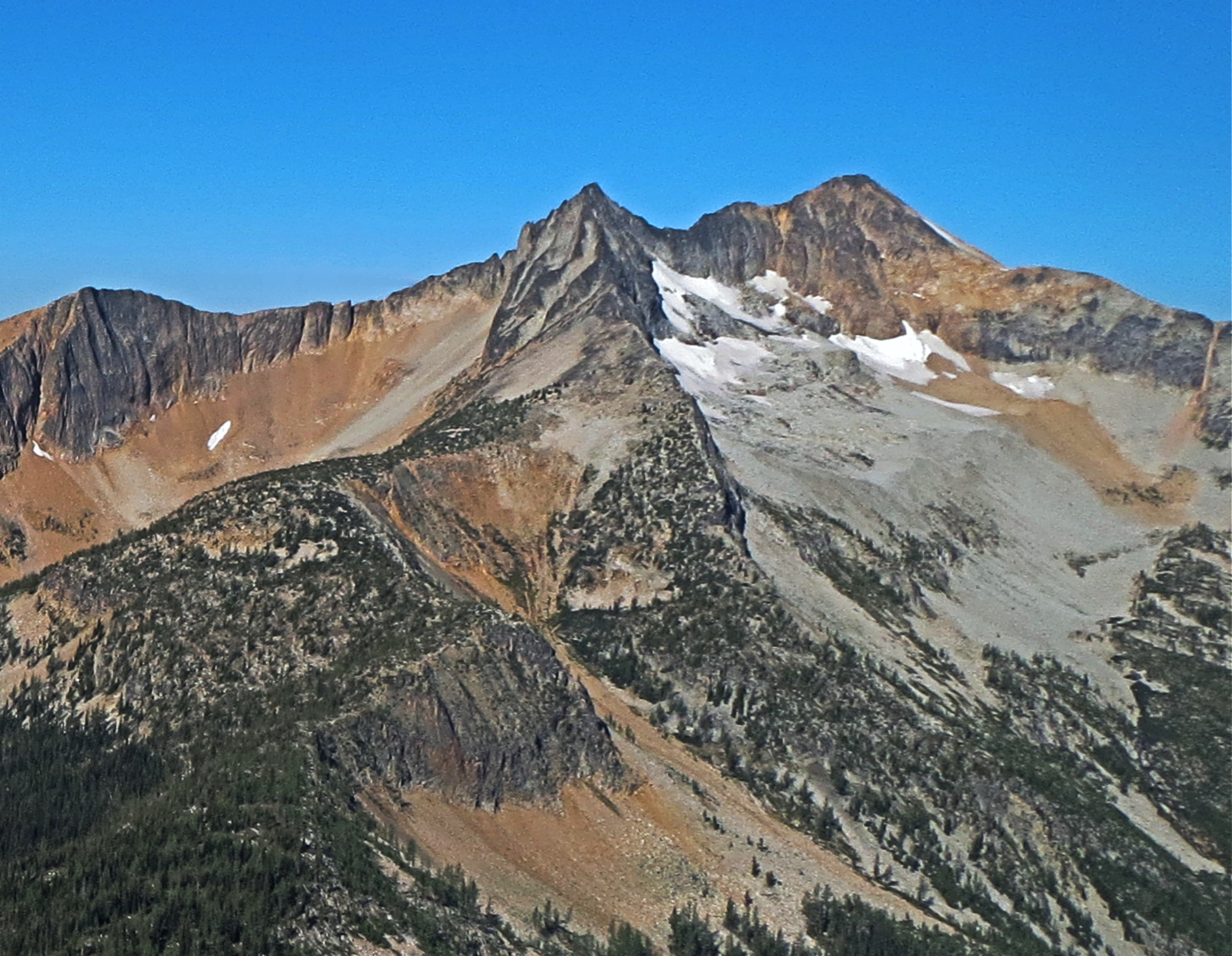
- Mount Lago from the east

Highest point
- Elevation: 8,745 ft (2,665 m)
- Prominence: 3,268 ft (996 m)
- Parent peak: Jack Mountain
- Listing: Washington highest summits 23rd
- Coordinates: 48°49′46″N 120°32′15″W

Geography
- Location within Washington (state) Location within the United States
- Interactive map of Mount Lago
- Location: Pasayten Wilderness; Okanogan County; Washington, U.S.
- Parent range: Okanogan Range; North Cascades; Cascade Range
- Topo map: USGS Mount Lago

Climbing
- First ascent: 1933 Hermann Ulrichs, Dick Alt
- Easiest route: Scramble south slopes

Mount Lago is a prominent 8,745-foot (2,665-metre) mountain summit located in the Okanogan Range of the North Cascades, in Okanogan County of Washington state. The mountain is situated on the eastern side of the Cascade crest, in the Pasayten Wilderness, on land managed by the Okanogan–Wenatchee National Forest. The nearest higher peak is Jack Mountain, 19.5 miles (31.4 km) to the west-southwest. Mount Lago is the highest summit of the Okanogan Range, and follows only Jack Mountain {9,075 ft} as the highest peak in the Pasayten Wilderness. Lago is the fourth-most prominent mountain in the Pasayten Wilderness. Precipitation runoff from the mountain drains into tributaries of the Pasayten River and Methow River. The mountain was named for Lage Wernstedt (1878–1959), a Forest Service surveyor who made numerous first ascents of the mountains he was mapping in the North Cascades. Lago, is a play on the way Americans pronounced his name. Lage, pronounced Loggy, had a son named Lago.

== Geology ==
The North Cascades features some of the most rugged topography in the Cascade Range with craggy peaks, granite spires, ridges, and deep glacial valleys. Geological events occurring many years ago created the diverse topography and drastic elevation changes over the Cascade Range leading to various climate differences.

The history of the formation of the Cascade Mountains dates back millions of years ago to the late Eocene Epoch. With the North American Plate overriding the Pacific Plate, episodes of volcanic igneous activity persisted. In addition, small fragments of the oceanic and continental lithosphere called terranes created the North Cascades about 50 million years ago.

During the Pleistocene period dating back over two million years ago, glaciation advancing and retreating repeatedly scoured the landscape leaving deposits of rock debris. The U-shaped cross section of the river valleys is a result of recent glaciation. Uplift and faulting in combination with glaciation have been the dominant processes which have created the tall peaks and deep valleys of the North Cascades area.

== Climate ==
Most weather fronts originate in the Pacific Ocean, and travel northeast toward the Cascade Mountains. As fronts approach the North Cascades, they are forced upward by the peaks of the Cascade Range, causing them to drop their moisture in the form of rain or snowfall onto the Cascades (Orographic lift). As a result, the west side of the North Cascades experiences higher precipitation than the east side, especially during the winter months in the form of snowfall. During winter months, weather is usually cloudy, but, due to high pressure systems over the Pacific Ocean that intensify during summer months, there is often little or no cloud cover during the summer.

== See also ==
- List of mountain peaks of Washington (state)
- Geography of the North Cascades
- Geology of the Pacific Northwest
