= Pasayten Wilderness =

Protected area in Washington, United States

- IUCN category Ib (wilderness area)
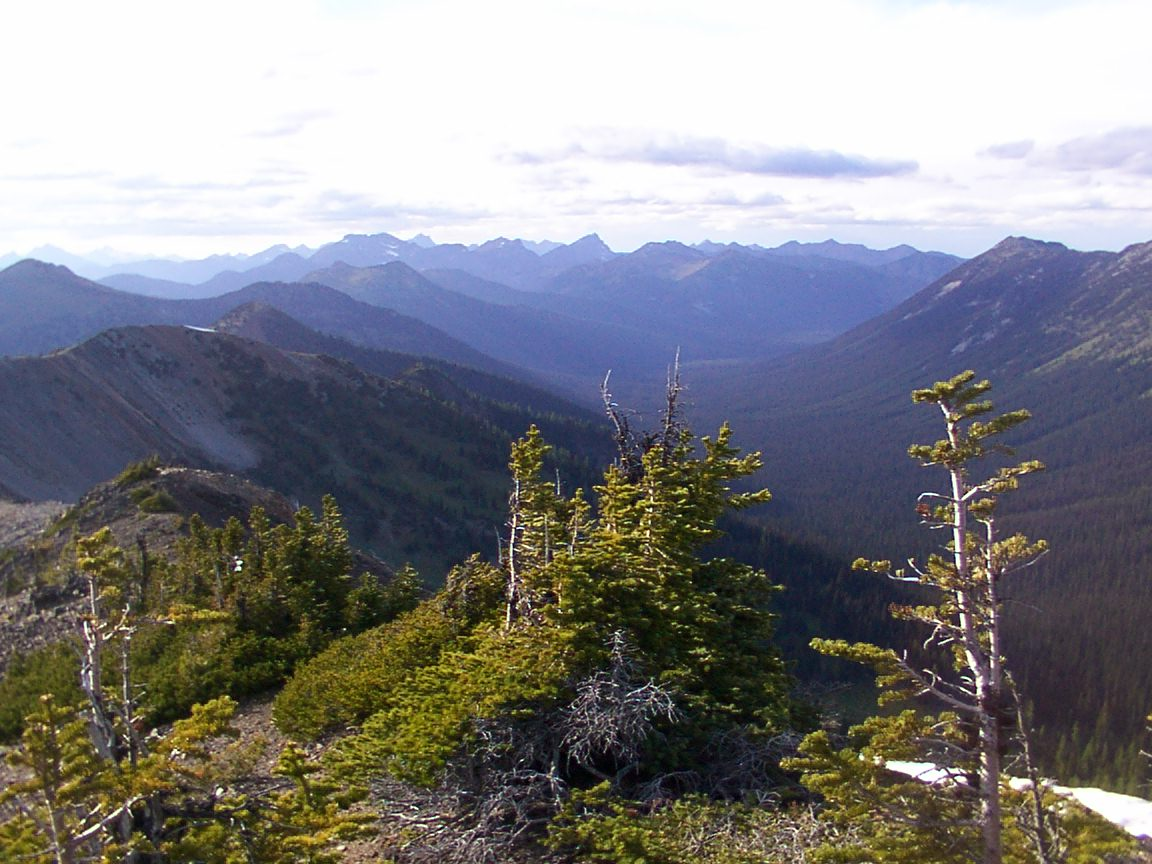
- View from Slate Peak

- Location within the United States
- Location: Okanogan / Whatcom counties, Washington, USA
- Nearest city: Mazama, WA, Princeton, BC
- Coordinates: 48°50′N 120°40′W
- Area: 531,539 acres (2,151.06 km^{2})
- Established: October 2, 1968
- Governing body: U.S. Forest Service
- Website: Pasayten Wilderness

The Pasayten Wilderness is a 531,539 acres (215,106 ha) protected area located within Okanogan–Wenatchee National Forest and Mount Baker National Forest in Washington state, centered on the Three Forks (48°54′02″N 120°38′01″W) of the Pasayten River, a tributary of the Similkameen River. Although part of the wilderness lies in Mount Baker-Snoqualmie National Forest, the largest section falls within the boundaries of Okanogan National Forest, which has responsibility for the wilderness's management. The wilderness is bordered by the Stephen Mather Wilderness to the west. The northern boundary of the wilderness is the Canada–US border. Across the border are Manning Provincial Park and Cathedral Provincial Park. The wilderness area is adjacent to the Ross Lake National Recreation Area to the west, and North Cascades National Park beyond that. The Pacific Crest National Scenic Trail has its northernmost section in this wilderness. The western part of the wilderness features dramatic views and peaks of the northern Washington Cascade Mountains while the eastern section is known for its grasslands and Alpine tundra. The tallest point in the Pasayten is Jack Mountain.

The Pasayten is traditional hunting territory of the Nlaka'pamux peoples of the Fraser Canyon and Nicola Country along with adjoining parts of the Cascade Range, although there are no Nlaka'pamux populations on the Washington side of the border.

== Habitat ==
Rugged ridges in the west flatten into more open plateaus toward the east, with deep drainages on both sides. Its diverse forest changes from fir, cedar, western hemlock in the west to fir, pine, and larch in the east. This region provides habitat for deer, moose, mountain goats, mountain lions, bighorn sheep, the gray wolf, and is home to the largest population of lynx in the Lower 48. Snow falls between October and May, and the hard packed snow may block the high western-side trails sometimes until early August. Eastern-side trails are usually free of snow by early July.

== Trails ==
More than 600 miles of trails provide access to the wilderness, many of them deceptively gentle at the start and become progressively difficult as they climb up multiple switchbacks into the higher elevations. The Pacific Crest Trail (PCT) crosses the area north-south for about 32 miles. The Boundary Trail begins in the southeast corner of the wilderness and meanders north and west for over 73 miles near the Canada–US border to eventually join the Pacific Crest Trail.

Some trails are regularly used by horsemen who frequent the wilderness. Stock animals are used to supply camping gear, provide transportation, and carry tools and equipment for trail repair and improvement as the wilderness does not allow motorized or even wheeled equipment.

Although popular trails are cleared and maintained every year, a large amount of trails are abandoned, closed, or otherwise not maintained. Some of these trails are still listed in the United States Forest Service maps of the area, while other simply appear as unmarked trail junctions. Because of the lack of maintenance of certain trails and size of the wilderness, some areas are very seldom visited except by the most intrepid of individuals. For the general public, it is recommended that one possess a strong knowledge of map use and other navigational tools to explore the wilderness in depth.

== See also ==
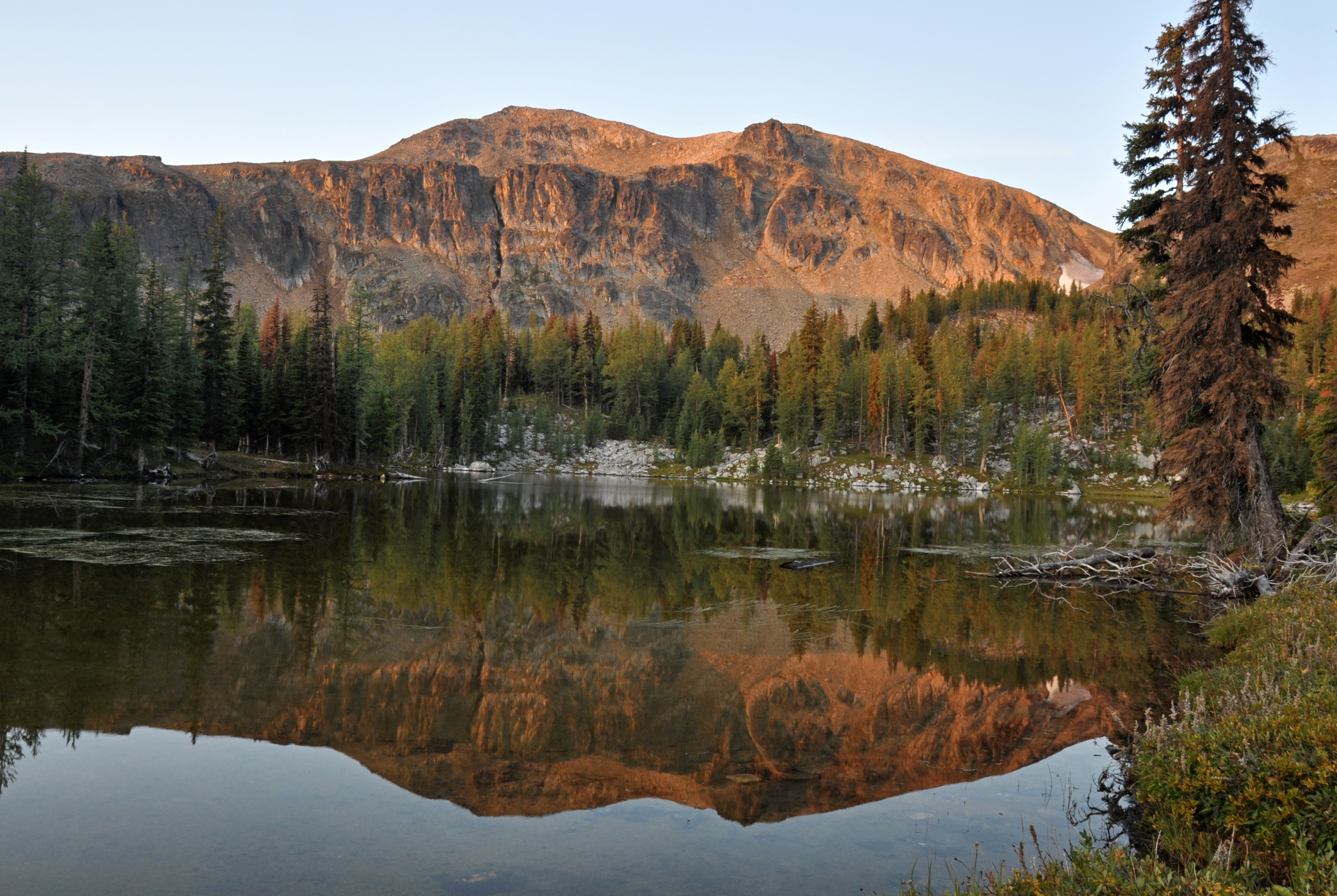
Sunrise at Ramon Lakes with Sheep Mountain in background

- Jack Mountain is the highest summit in the Pasayten
- Mount Lago is the second highest summit in the Pasayten
- Robinson Mountain is the third highest summit in the Pasayten
- Remmel Mountain is the most prominent mountain in the Pasayten.
- Pasayten Peak
- Cathedral Peak
- Crater Mountain
- Monument Peak
- North Cascades

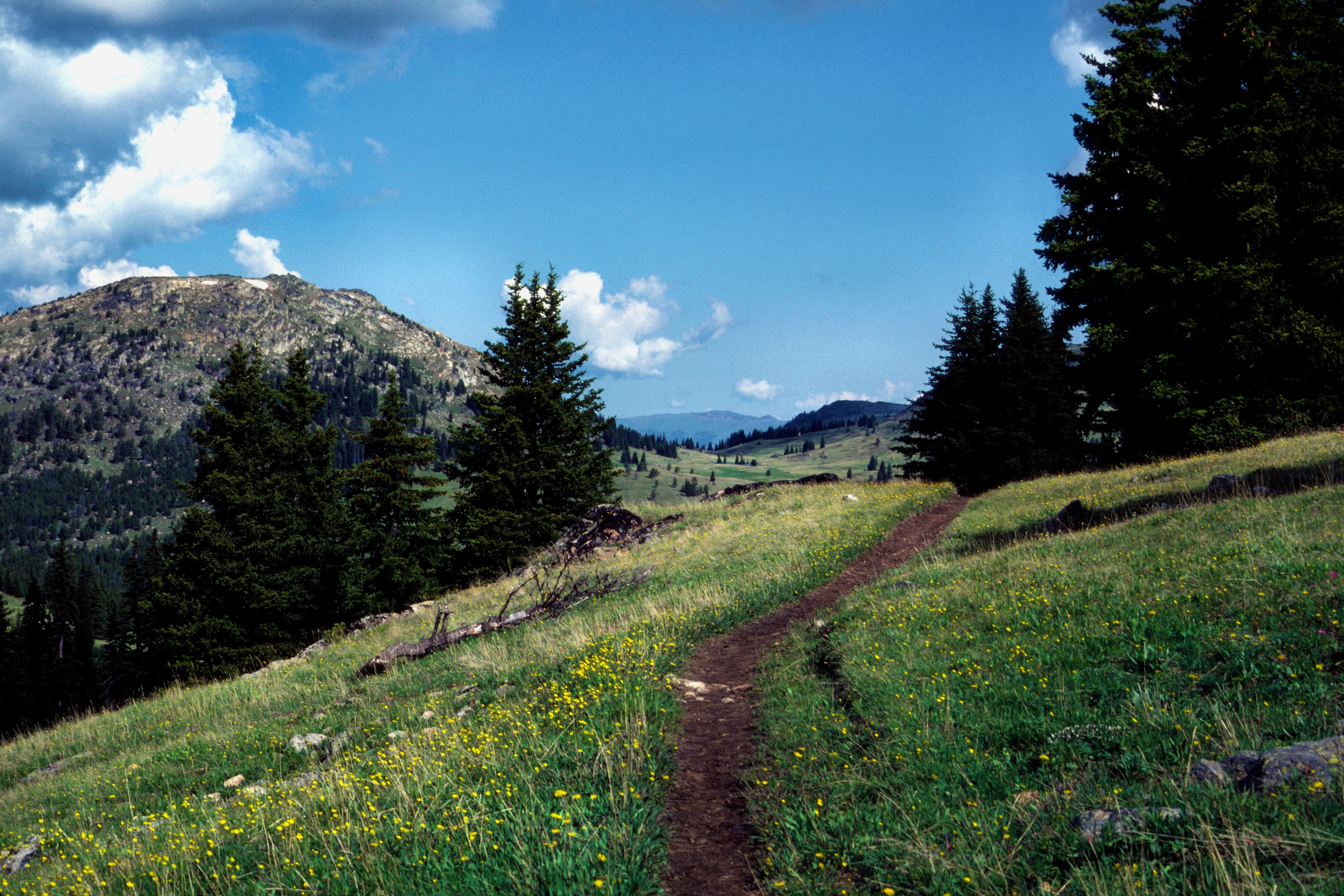
Horseshoe Basin
