= Pasayten River =

Location
- Country: Canada
- Province: British Columbia
- Land District: Similkameen Division Yale

Physical characteristics
- Source: Confluence of the West and Middle Forks
- Mouth: Similkameen River
  - coordinates: 49°9′25″N 120°34′50″W
- Discharge
  - location: Above Calcite Creek
  - average: 7.75 m^{3}/s (274 cu ft/s)
  - minimum: 0.28 m^{3}/s (9.9 cu ft/s)
  - maximum: 114 m^{3}/s (4,000 cu ft/s)

The Pasayten River is a tributary of the Similkameen River, in the Canadian province of British Columbia and the U.S. state of Washington. The Pasayten River is part of the Columbia River drainage basin, being a tributary of the Similkameen River, which flows into the Okanagan River, which flows into the Columbia River.

== Course ==
The Pasayten River originates in the North Cascades part of the Cascade Range. It flows generally north through the Pasayten Wilderness and across the international boundary.

=== West Fork ===
The West Fork Pasayten River originates on the north slopes of Slate Peak and flows north until it reaches Three Forks, where it and the Middle Fork converge to form the Pasayten River Proper. Rock Creek also joins here, which makes the name "Three Forks" very appealing to not only the three way confluence, but to the nearby cabin.

=== Middle Fork ===
The Middle Fork Pasayten River originates in Slate Pass and flows north until it reaches Three Forks, where it and the West Fork converge to form the Pasayten River Proper.

=== East Fork ===
The East Fork Pasayten River originates at Dollar Watch Pass and flows west, picking up the outlet stream from Big Hidden Lake just over halfway to its eventual meeting with the mainstream of the Pasayten just upstream from the Canada/United States border.

=== Mainstream ===
The Pasayten River Proper begins at Three Forks, where the West and Middle Forks converge to form the mainstream. The Pasayten, prior to crossing the border, is joined by the East Fork. The river, after crossing the border, continues to flow north. The Pasayten River flows just east of E. C. Manning Provincial Park before joining the Similkameen River near East Gate along the Hope-Princeton Highway.

== Tributaries ==
=== Tributaries in the US ===
West Fork

- Oregon Creek
- Shaw Creek
- Holman Creek
- Threemile Creek
- Kid Creek

Middle Fork

- Silver Creek
- Shack Creek
- Point Creke
- Berk Creek

East Fork

- Mayo Creek
- Quartz Creek
- Snowslide Creek
- White Creek
- Getaway Creek
- Farewell Creek
- Judy Creek

Mainstream

- Rock Creek
- Lease Creek
- Lodgepole Creek
- Soda Creek
- Thomson Creek
- Holdover Creek
- Central Creek
- Harrison Creek
- Trail Creek
- Bunker Hill Creek

=== Tributaries in Canada ===
- Peeve Creek
- Calcite Creek

== See also ==
- List of rivers of Washington (state)
- List of rivers of British Columbia
- Tributaries of the Columbia River
