= Okanagan Range =

Mountain range in Canada and the United States

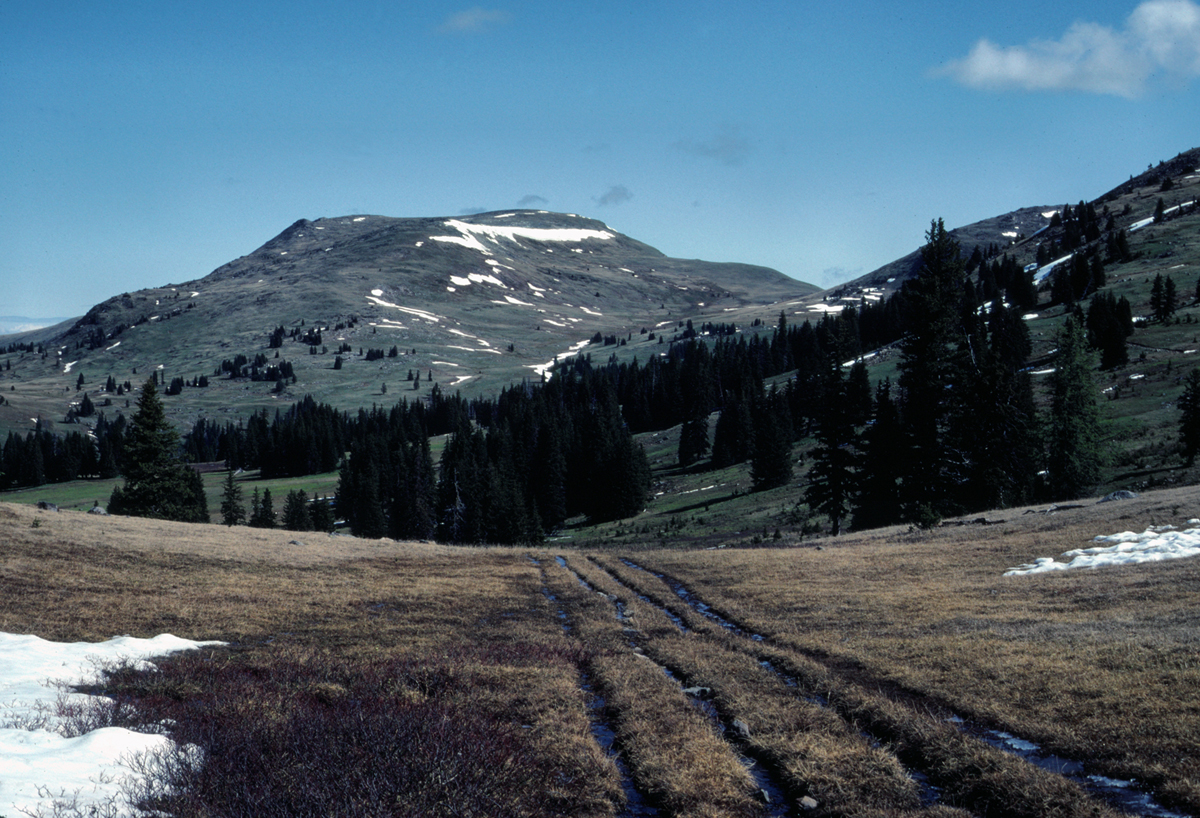
- Horseshoe Basin, Armstrong Peak, Okanagan Range, Washington

Dimensions
- Area: 775 km^{2} (299 mi^{2})

Geography
- Countries: Canada and United States
- States/Provinces: British Columbia and Washington
- Range coordinates: 49°5′N 120°10′W
- Parent range: North Cascades/Canadian Cascades

The Okanagan Range or Okanogan Range is a small subrange of the Cascade Range straddling the border between British Columbia and Washington south of the Similkameen River on the inland side of the range. The range is the northeasternmost extremity of the Cascade Range.

According to Fred Beckey there are differences of opinion about the names and locations of the subranges of the northern Cascades, especially between Canadian and American geographers. Nevertheless early geologists and topographers had a fundamental agreement about the location and names of the subranges. The Okanagan Range was seen as bounded by the Pasayten River on the west and continuing east to Chopaka Mountain. The Hozameen Range was seen as separated from the Okanagan Range by the Pasayten River. This definition of the Okanagan Range included most of today's Pasayten Wilderness and extending south to joins the main Cascade Range at Harts Pass, near the headwaters of the Methow River. The core of the Okanagan Range under this definition marks the divide between streams that flow north to the Similkameen River and those that flow south to the Methow River.

BCGNIS defines the northern boundary of the Okanagan Range as Young Creek and the lower Ashnola River.

Peakbagger.com defines the Okanogan Range as a much larger region bounded to the south by the Methow River and to the east by the Okanagan River and Similkameen River.

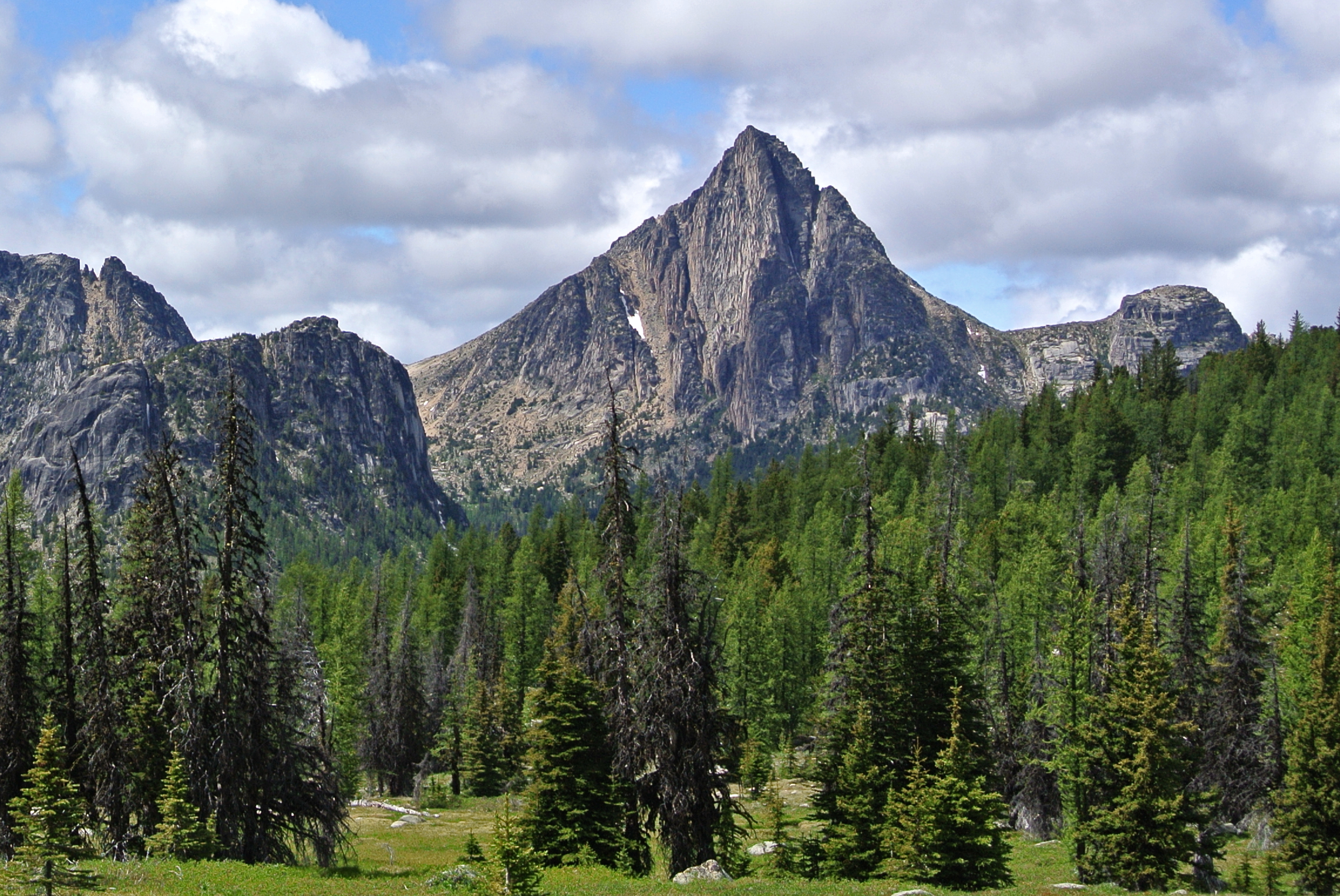
Cathedral Peak from Apex Pass

The Okanagan Range should not be confused with the Okanagan Highland, which is located on the farther side of the Okanagan Valley and is sometimes classified as part of the Monashee Mountains.

The eight highest mountains of the range are Mount Lago (8,745 ft), Robinson Mountain (8,726 ft), Remmel Mountain (8,690 ft), Grimface Mountain (8,645 ft), Ptarmigan Peak (8,614 ft), Cathedral Peak (8,606 ft), Mount Carru (8,595 ft), and Monument Peak (8,592 ft).

== See also ==
- List of mountain ranges
