= Mount Hardy (disambiguation) =

Mount Hardy is a mountain in Antarctica.

Mount Hardy may also refer to:

- Mount Hardy (Washington), a mountain in Washington state
- Mount Hardy (North Carolina), a Southern Sixer mountain in the state of North Carolina
