= Holliway Mountain =

Mountain in Washington (state), United States

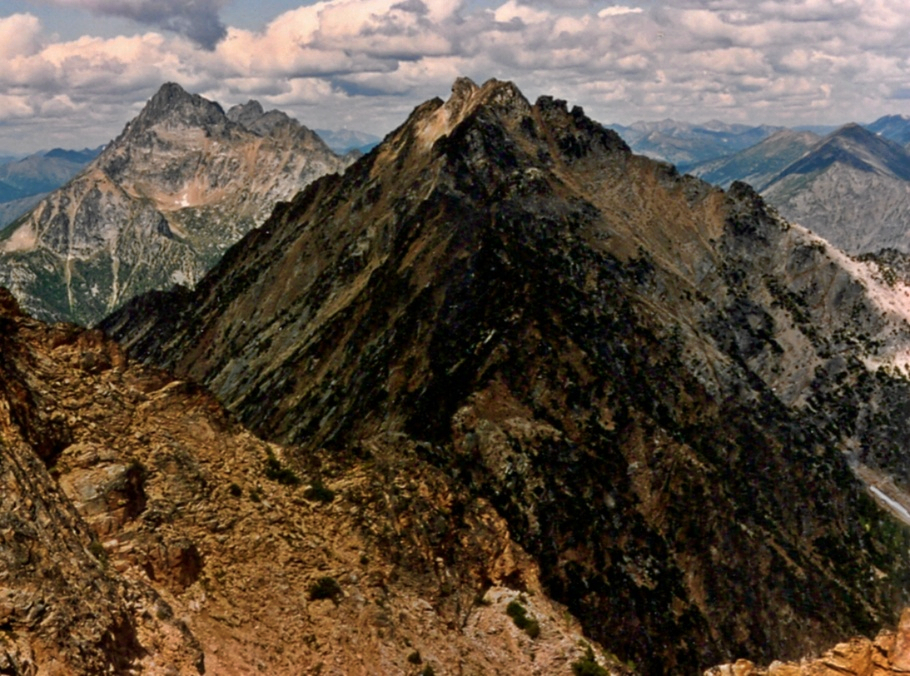
- Holliway Mountain seen from Golden Horn

Highest point
- Elevation: 8,000 ft (2,400 m)
- Prominence: 600 ft (180 m)
- Parent peak: Golden Horn (8,366 ft)
- Isolation: 0.97 mi (1.56 km)
- Coordinates: 48°37′02″N 120°43′50″W

Geography
- Location within Washington (state) Location within the United States
- Interactive map of Holliway Mountain
- Location: Okanogan County, Washington, U.S.
- Parent range: North Cascades
- Topo map: USGS Washington Pass

Geology
- Rock type: Granite

Climbing
- Easiest route: Scrambling, class 3

Holliway Mountain is an 8000+ ft granite summit located in Okanogan County in Washington state. It is part of the Okanogan Range which is a sub-range of the North Cascades Range. Holliway Mountain is situated near the headwaters of the Methow River on land administered by the Okanogan–Wenatchee National Forest. The nearest higher peak is Golden Horn, 0.91 miles (1.46 km) to the south. Azurite Peak is located three miles to the north-northwest.

== Climate ==
Holliway Mountain is located in the marine west coast climate zone of western North America. Most weather fronts originate in the Pacific Ocean, and travel northeast toward the Cascade Mountains. As fronts approach the North Cascades, they are forced upward by the peaks of the Cascade Range, causing them to drop their moisture in the form of rain or snowfall onto the Cascades (Orographic lift). As a result, the west side of the North Cascades experiences high precipitation, especially during the winter months in the form of snowfall. During winter months, weather is usually cloudy, but, due to high pressure systems over the Pacific Ocean that intensify during summer months, there is often little or no cloud cover during the summer.

== Geology ==
The North Cascades features some of the most rugged topography in the Cascade Range with craggy peaks, ridges, and deep glacial valleys. Geological events occurring many years ago created the diverse topography and drastic elevation changes over the Cascade Range leading to the various climate differences.

The history of the formation of the Cascade Mountains dates back millions of years ago to the late Eocene Epoch. With the North American Plate overriding the Pacific Plate, episodes of volcanic igneous activity persisted. In addition, small fragments of the oceanic and continental lithosphere called terranes created the North Cascades about 50 million years ago.

During the Pleistocene period dating back over two million years ago, glaciation advancing and retreating repeatedly scoured the landscape leaving deposits of rock debris. The U-shaped cross section of the river valleys is a result of recent glaciation. Uplift and faulting in combination with glaciation have been the dominant processes which have created the tall peaks and deep valleys of the North Cascades area. Holliway Mountain, like many of the granite peaks in the Washington Pass area, is part of the Golden Horn Batholith.

== Gallery ==
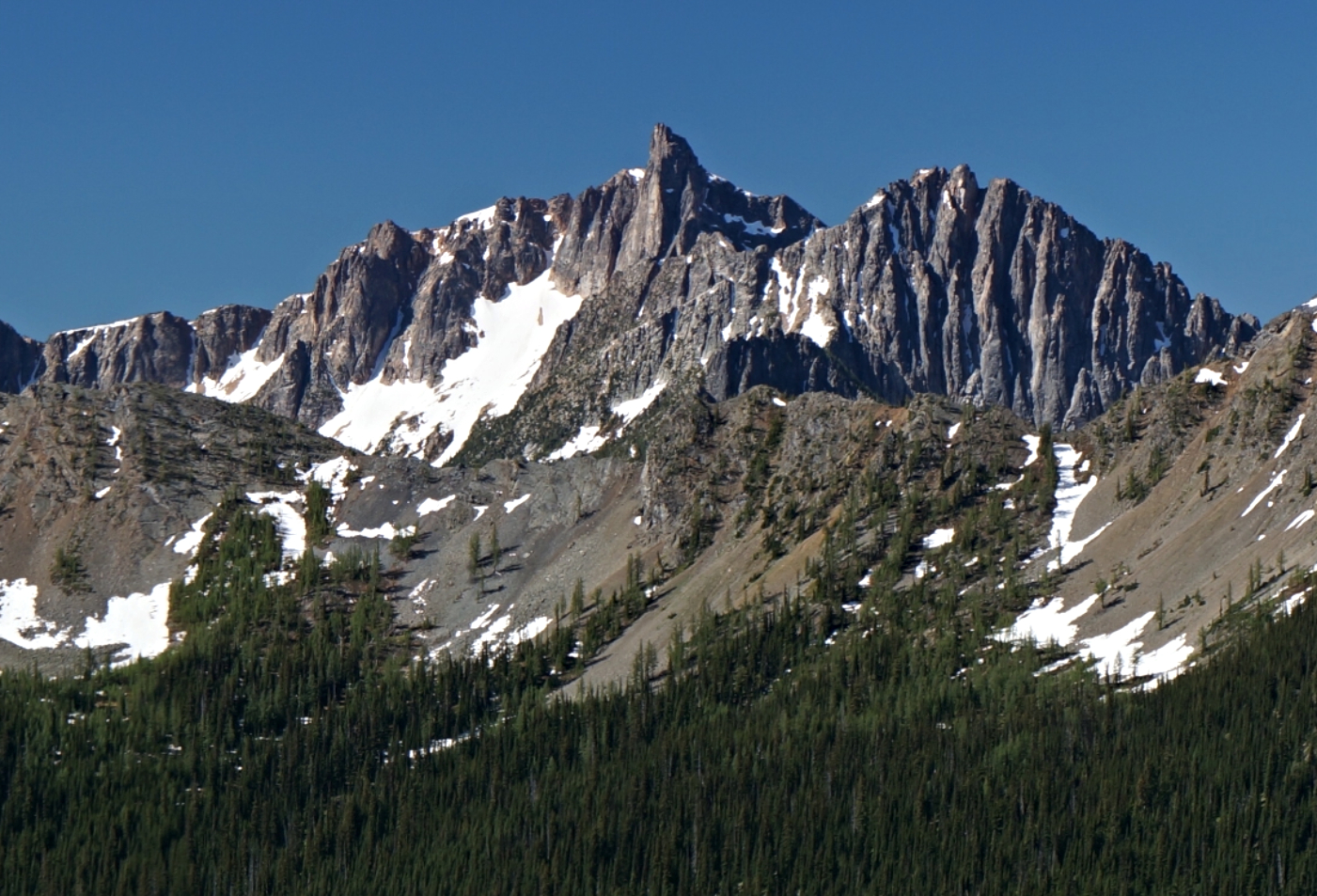
Golden Horn and Holliway (right) from the north

== See also ==
- Geography of the North Cascades
- Geology of the Pacific Northwest
