= Jackita Ridge =

Ridge in Washington state, US

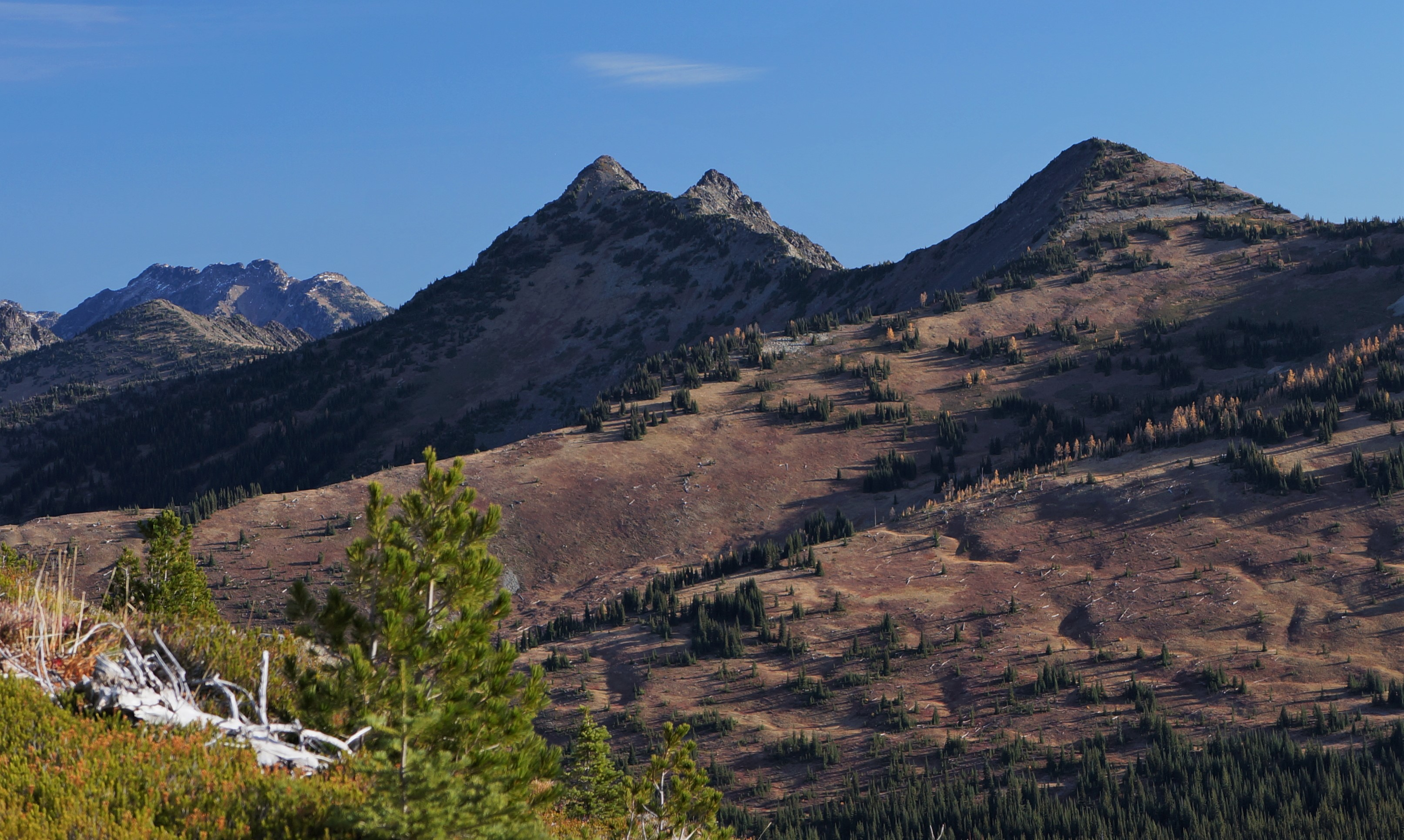
- Jackita Ridge seen from southwest

Highest point
- Elevation: 7,350 ft (2,240 m)
- Prominence: 1,270 ft (387 m)
- Parent peak: Crater Mountain (8,128 ft)
- Isolation: 3.50 mi (5.63 km)
- Coordinates: 48°46′24″N 120°51′07″W

Geography
- Location within Washington (state) Location within the United States
- Interactive map of Jackita Ridge
- Country: United States
- State: Washington
- County: Whatcom
- Protected area: Pasayten Wilderness
- Parent range: Hozameen Range; North Cascades; Cascade Range
- Topo map: USGS Shull Mountain

Geology
- Rock type: greenstone

Climbing
- Easiest route: Scrambling

Jackita Ridge is a 7,350-foot (2,240-metre) ridge located in the Pasayten Wilderness, in Whatcom County of Washington state. It is part of the Hozameen Range which is a subset of the North Cascades. The highest point is called Jackita Peak, and the Jackita Ridge Trail traverses below the west aspect of this summit, providing access for an off-trail scramble to the top. The nearest higher neighbor is Crater Mountain, 3.9 miles (6.3 km) to the southwest, Jack Mountain is set 4.77 miles (7.68 km) to the west, and McKay Ridge is 5.7 miles (9.2 km) to the south. Precipitation runoff from this ridge drains to Ross Lake via Devils Creek and Canyon Creek, which are part of the Skagit River drainage basin. The first ascent may have been made in 1926 by the United States Coast and Geodetic Survey, which placed a Jackita benchmark.

== Climate ==
Jackita Ridge is located in the marine west coast climate zone of western North America. Weather fronts originating in the Pacific Ocean travel northeast toward the Cascade Mountains. As fronts approach the North Cascades, they are forced upward by the peaks of the Cascade Range (orographic lift), causing them to drop their moisture in the form of rain or snow onto the Cascades. As a result, the west side of the North Cascades experiences high precipitation, especially during the winter months in the form of snowfall. Because of maritime influence, snow tends to be wet and heavy, resulting in avalanche danger. During winter months, weather is usually cloudy, but due to high pressure systems over the Pacific Ocean that intensify during summer months, there is often little or no cloud cover during the summer. The months July through September offer the most favorable weather for viewing or hiking Jackita Ridge.

== Geology ==
The North Cascades features some of the most rugged topography in the Cascade Range with craggy peaks and ridges and deep glacial valleys. Geological events occurring many years ago created the diverse topography and drastic elevation changes over the Cascade Range leading to the various climate differences. These climate differences lead to vegetation variety defining the ecoregions in this area.

The history of the formation of the Cascade Mountains dates back millions of years ago to the late Eocene Epoch. With the North American Plate overriding the Pacific Plate, episodes of volcanic igneous activity persisted. In addition, small fragments of the oceanic and continental lithosphere called terranes created the North Cascades about 50 million years ago.

During the Pleistocene period dating back over two million years ago, glaciation advancing and retreating repeatedly scoured the landscape leaving deposits of rock debris. The U-shaped cross section of the river valleys is a result of recent glaciation. Uplift and faulting in combination with glaciation have been the dominant processes which have created the tall peaks and deep valleys of the North Cascades area.

== Gallery ==
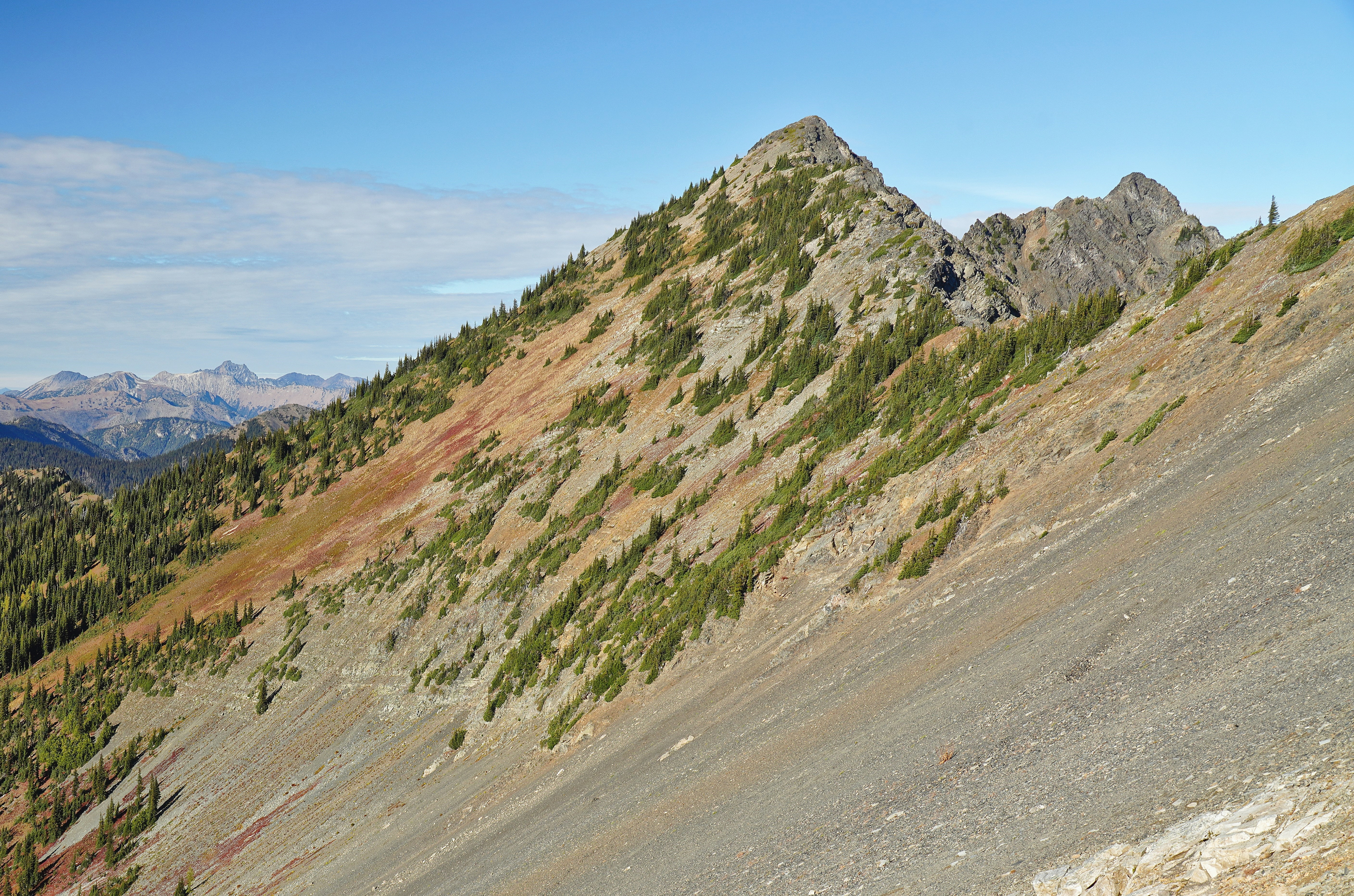
Jackita (7,350 ft) centered

== See also ==
- Geography of the North Cascades
- Geology of the Pacific Northwest
