= Cone Mountain =

Cone Mountain may refer to:

- Cone Mountain (Alberta) in Alberta, Canada
- Cone Mountain (Washington) in Washington state, United States
