= Syncline Mountain =

Mountain in Washington (state), United States

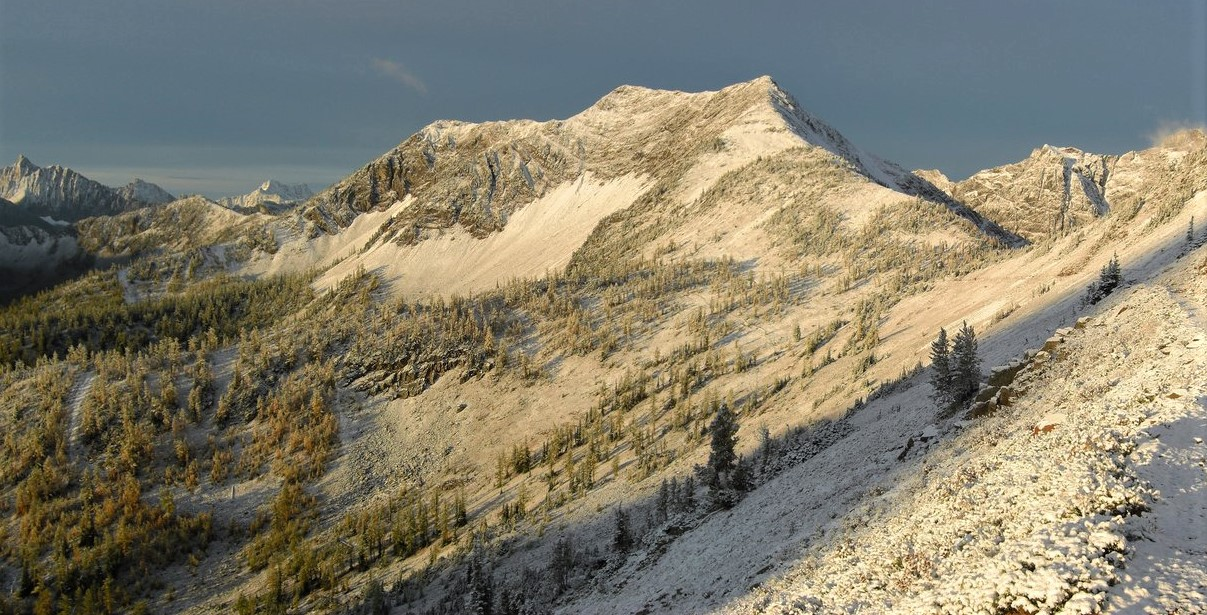
- North aspect from PCT

Highest point
- Elevation: 7,560 ft (2,300 m)
- Prominence: 1,360 ft (410 m)
- Parent peak: Pasayten Peak (7,850 ft)
- Isolation: 2.08 mi (3.35 km)
- Coordinates: 48°41′14″N 120°42′43″W

Geography
- Location within Washington (state) Location within the United States
- Interactive map of Syncline Mountain
- Location: Okanogan County / Whatcom County; Washington, U.S.
- Parent range: Okanogan Range; North Cascades; Cascade Range
- Topo map: USGS Slate Peak

Geology
- Rock type(s): sandstone, shale

Climbing
- Easiest route: Harts Pass, PCT class 2 scrambling

Syncline Mountain is a 7,560-foot (2,300-metre) mountain summit located on the shared border between Okanogan County and Whatcom County in Washington state. It is part of the Okanogan Range, which is a sub-range of the North Cascades, and is situated on land managed by the Okanogan–Wenatchee National Forest. Its nearest neighbor is Tatie Peak, 0.8 miles (1.3 km) to the north, and the nearest higher neighbor is Mount Ballard, 2.1 miles (3.4 km) to the west. The Pacific Crest Trail traverses the east slope of the peak, with an off-trail scramble to reach the summit. Precipitation runoff from Syncline Mountain drains east into Trout Creek which is a tributary of the Methow River, or northwest into Slate Creek, which is part of the Skagit River drainage basin. This unofficially named mountain features a conspicuous syncline, hence its descriptive name.

== Climate ==
Most weather fronts originate in the Pacific Ocean, and travel northeast toward the Cascade Mountains. As fronts approach the North Cascades, they are forced upward by the peaks of the Cascade Range, causing them to drop their moisture in the form of rain or snowfall onto the Cascades (Orographic lift). As a result, the west side of the North Cascades experiences higher precipitation than the east side, especially during the winter months in the form of snowfall. During winter months, weather is usually cloudy, but, due to high pressure systems over the Pacific Ocean that intensify during summer months, there is often little or no cloud cover during the summer. The months July through September offer the most favorable weather, and the Forest Service access road being open for the season. However, smoke from distant wildfires may potentially reduce visibility, and smoky summer conditions have been increasing with climate change.

== Geology ==
The North Cascades features some of the most rugged topography in the Cascade Range with craggy peaks, spires, ridges, and deep glacial valleys. Geological events occurring many years ago created the diverse topography and drastic elevation changes over the Cascade Range leading to the various climate differences.

The history of the formation of the Cascade Mountains dates back millions of years ago to the late Eocene Epoch. With the North American Plate overriding the Pacific Plate, episodes of volcanic igneous activity persisted. In addition, small fragments of the oceanic and continental lithosphere called terranes created the North Cascades about 50 million years ago.

During the Pleistocene period dating back over two million years ago, glaciation advancing and retreating repeatedly scoured the landscape leaving deposits of rock debris. The U-shaped cross section of the river valleys is a result of recent glaciation. Uplift and faulting in combination with glaciation have been the dominant processes which have created the tall peaks and deep valleys of the North Cascades area.

== See also ==
- Geography of the North Cascades
- Geology of the Pacific Northwest
