= Mount Hardy (Washington) =

Mountain in Washington (state), United States

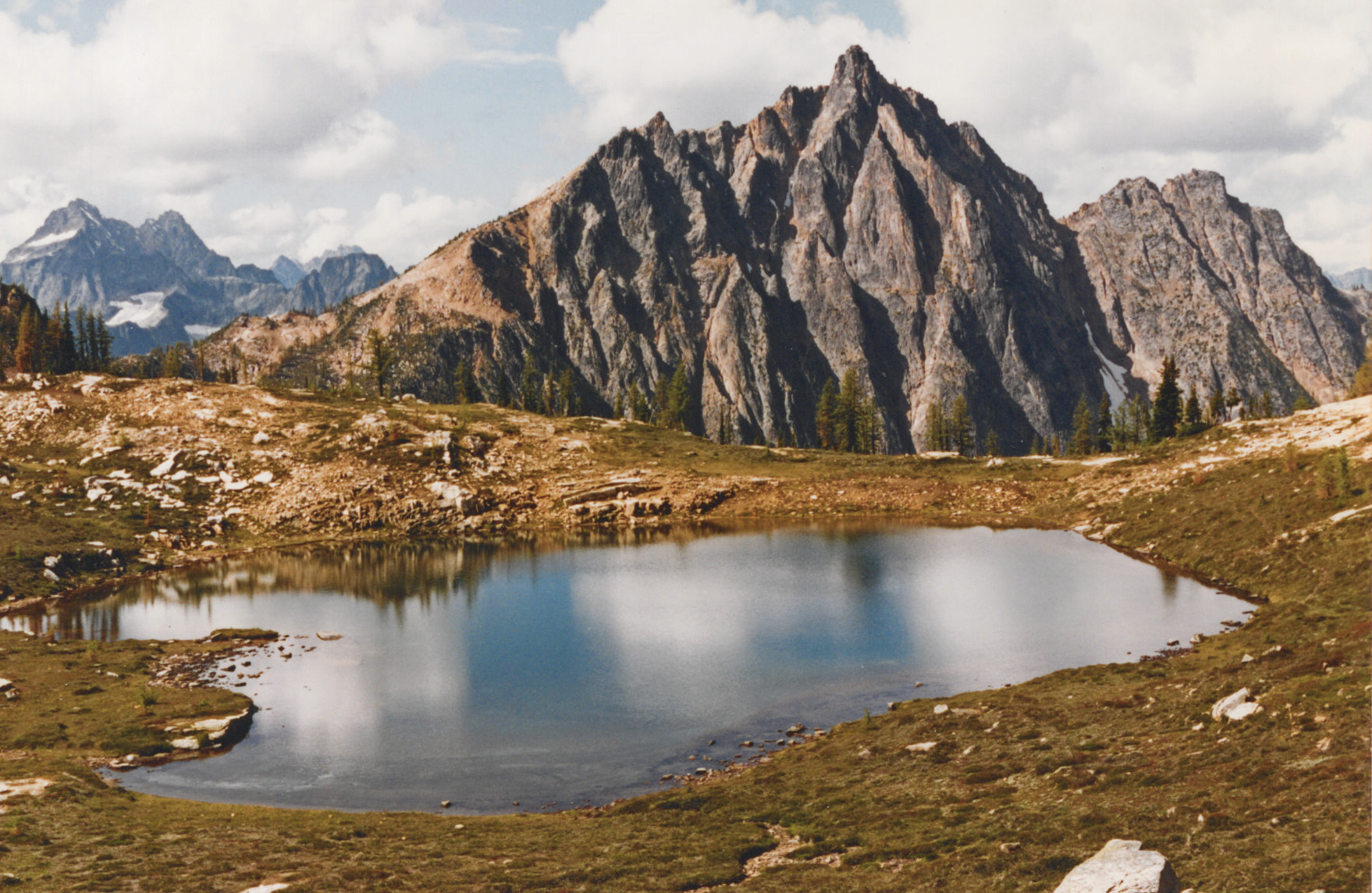
- Mount Hardy from upper Snowy Lake

Highest point
- Elevation: 8,099 ft (2,469 m)
- Prominence: 1,519 ft (463 m)
- Parent peak: Golden Horn (8,366 ft)
- Isolation: 1.75 mi (2.82 km)
- Coordinates: 48°34′54″N 120°45′20″W

Geography
- Location within Washington (state) Location within the United States
- Interactive map of Mount Hardy
- Country: United States
- State: Washington
- County: Okanogan / Skagit
- Protected area: Okanogan National Forest
- Parent range: Okanogan Range; North Cascades
- Topo map: USGS Mount Arriva

Geology
- Rock type: Granite

Climbing
- First ascent: Sidney Schmerling, Hermann Ulrichs in 1933
- Easiest route: class 3 scrambling

Mount Hardy is an 8,099-foot (2,469-metre) mountain summit located on the common border of Okanogan County with Skagit County in the U.S. state of Washington. It is part of the Okanogan Range which is a sub-range of the North Cascades Range. Mount Hardy is situated west of Methow Pass, at headwaters of the Methow River, on land administered by the Okanogan–Wenatchee National Forest. Topographic relief is significant as the summit rises approximately 2,500 feet (760 meters) above the West Fork Methow River in one-half mile (0.8 km). The nearest higher peak is Golden Horn, 1.75 miles (2.82 km) to the northeast. Mount Hardy can be seen from the North Cascades Highway which traverses below the southwestern base of the mountain. This mountain's toponym was officially adopted in 1973 by the United States Board on Geographic Names.

== Climate ==
Mount Hardy is located in the marine west coast climate zone of western North America. Most weather fronts originating in the Pacific Ocean travel northeast toward the Cascade Mountains. As fronts approach the North Cascades, they are forced upward by the peaks of the Cascade Range (orographic lift), causing them to drop their moisture in the form of rain or snowfall onto the Cascades. As a result, the west side of the North Cascades experiences high precipitation, especially during the winter months in the form of snowfall. Because of maritime influence, snow tends to be wet and heavy, resulting in high avalanche danger. During winter months, weather is usually cloudy, but due to high pressure systems over the Pacific Ocean that intensify during summer months, there is often little or no cloud cover during the summer.

== Geology ==
The North Cascades features some of the most rugged topography in the Cascade Range with craggy peaks, ridges, and deep glacial valleys. Geological events occurring many years ago created the diverse topography and drastic elevation changes over the Cascade Range leading to the various climate differences. These climate differences lead to vegetation variety defining the ecoregions in this area.

The history of the formation of the Cascade Mountains dates back millions of years ago to the late Eocene Epoch. With the North American Plate overriding the Pacific Plate, episodes of volcanic igneous activity persisted. In addition, small fragments of the oceanic and continental lithosphere called terranes created the North Cascades about 50 million years ago. Like many of the peaks of the Washington Pass area, Mount Hardy is carved from Rapakivi texture granite of the Golden Horn batholith.

During the Pleistocene period dating back over two million years ago, glaciation advancing and retreating repeatedly scoured the landscape leaving deposits of rock debris. The U-shaped cross section of the river valleys is a result of recent glaciation. Uplift and faulting in combination with glaciation have been the dominant processes which have created the tall peaks and deep valleys of the North Cascades area.

== Gallery ==
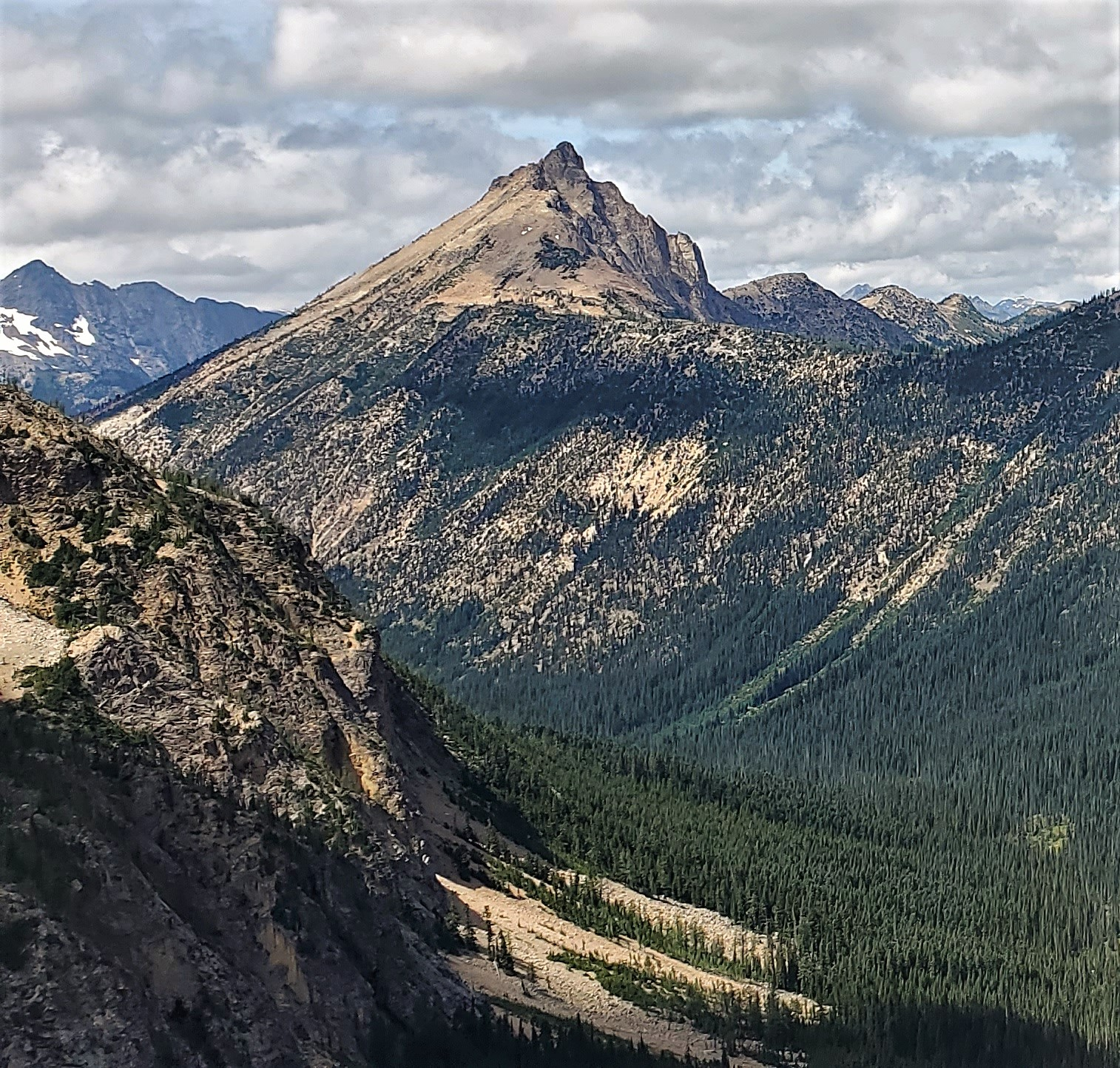
Mount Hardy from the east-southeast

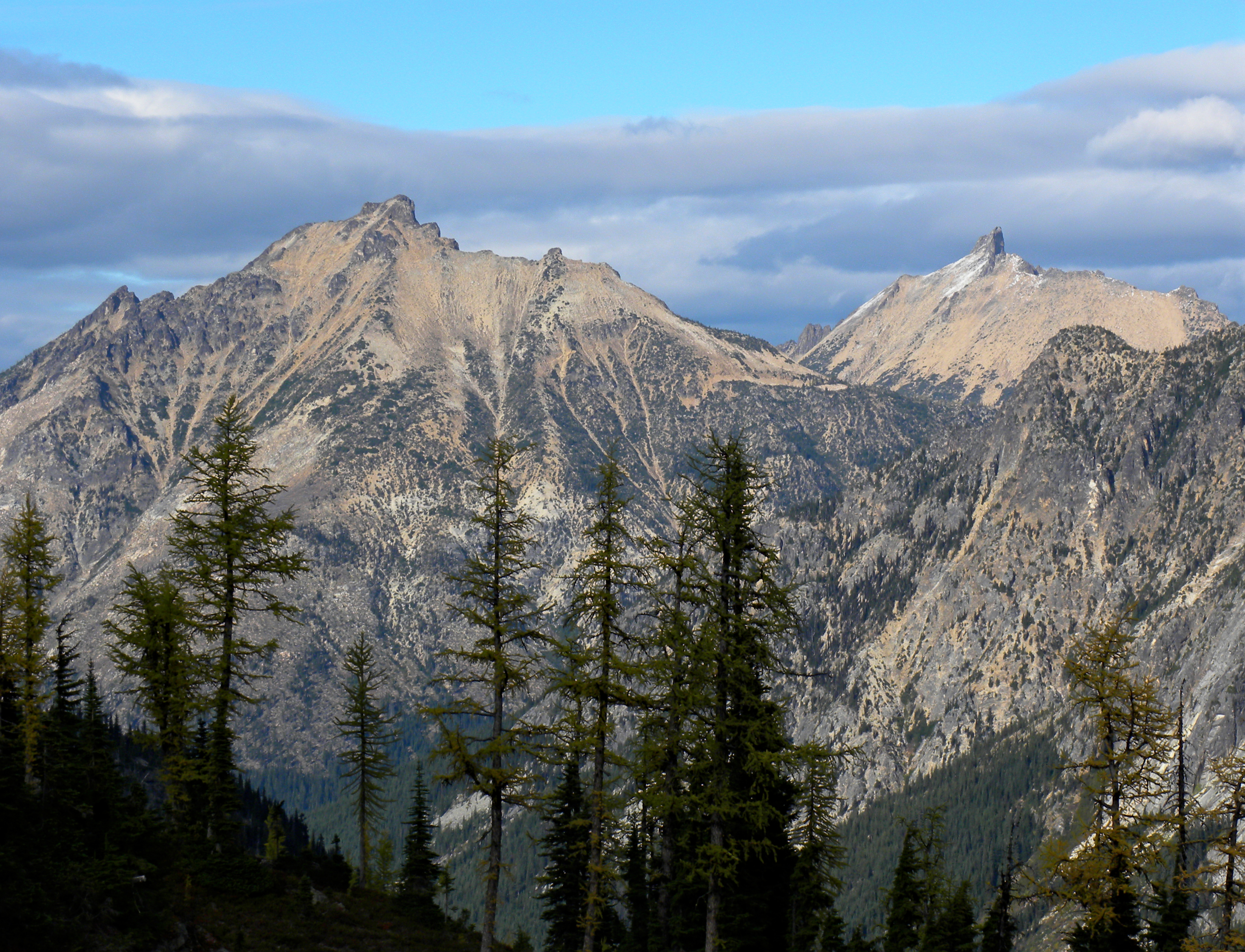
Mount Hardy (left), and Golden Horn seen from the Maple Pass area

== See also ==
- Geography of the North Cascades
- Geology of the Pacific Northwest
- List of mountain peaks of Washington (state)
