= Cone Mountain (Washington) =

Mountain in Washington (state), United States

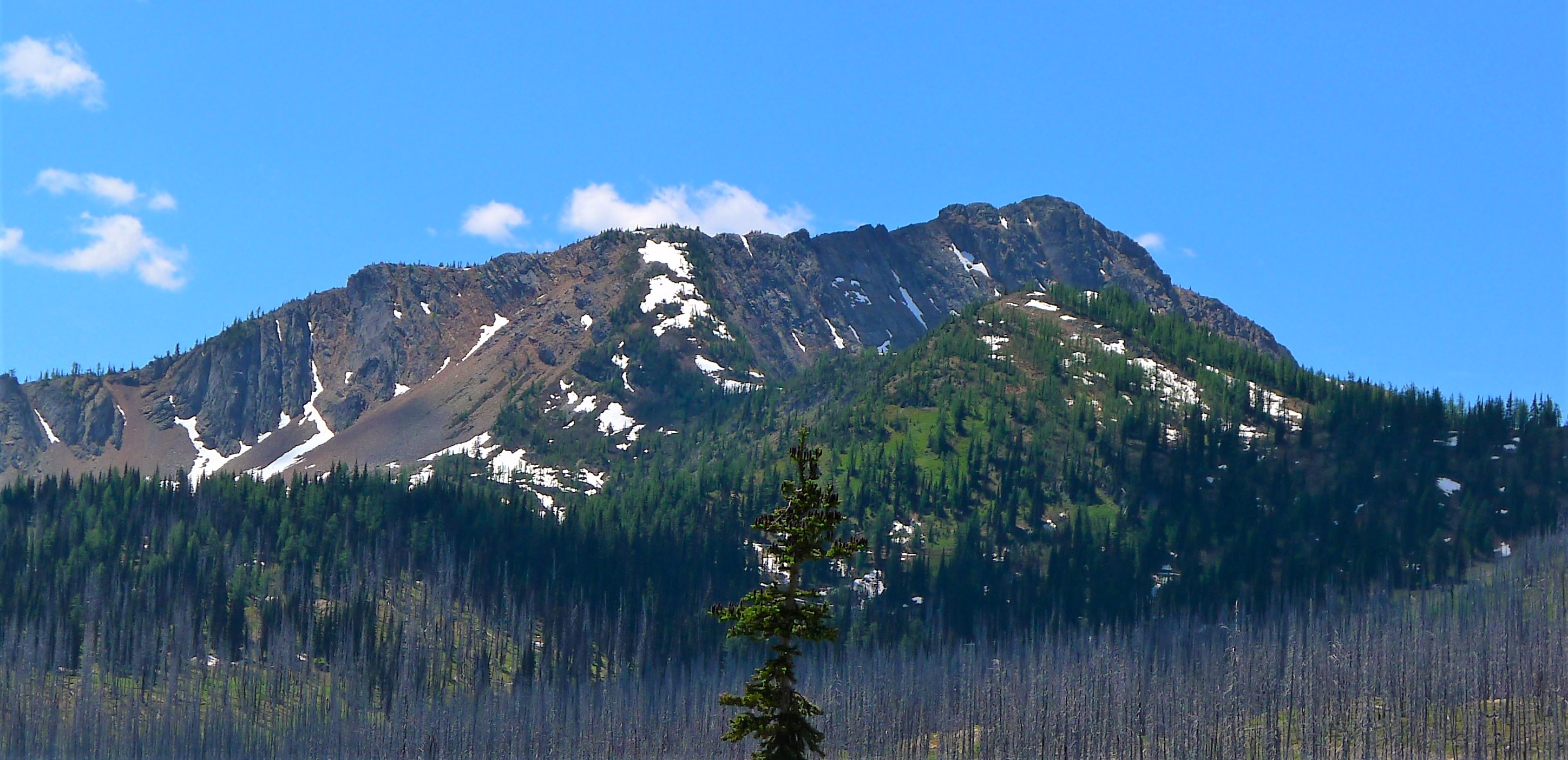
- North aspect

Highest point
- Elevation: 7,429 ft (2,264 m)
- Prominence: 523 ft (159 m)
- Parent peak: Syncline Mountain (7,580 ft)
- Isolation: 1.49 mi (2.40 km)
- Coordinates: 48°41′40″N 120°40′54″W

Geography
- Location within Washington (state) Location within the United States
- Interactive map of Cone Mountain
- Country: United States
- State: Washington
- County: Okanogan / Whatcom
- Protected area: Okanogan–Wenatchee National Forest
- Parent range: Okanogan Range; North Cascades; Cascade Range
- Topo map: USGS Slate Peak

Geology
- Rock age: Cretaceous
- Rock type: Marine sedimentary rock

Cone Mountain is a 7,429-foot (2,264-metre) summit in Washington state, United States.

== Description ==
Cone Mountain is located on the border that Okanogan County shares with Whatcom County, and it is part of the Okanagan Range which is a sub-range of the North Cascades. The mountain is situated on land managed by the Okanogan–Wenatchee National Forest. Cone Mountain is set on the crest of the Cascade Range, so precipitation runoff from the peak drains south into Trout Creek which is a tributary of the Methow River, and north into headwaters of Slate Creek, which is part of the Skagit River drainage basin. Topographic relief is significant as the summit rises 2,630 feet (802 meters) above South Fork Trout Creek in one mile (1.6 km). The Pacific Crest Trail traverses the slopes of the peak, with an off-trail scramble to reach the summit. The nearest higher neighbor is Syncline Mountain, 1.48 miles (2.38 km) to the west-southwest. This mountain's toponym has not been officially adopted by the United States Board on Geographic Names.

== Climate ==
Weather fronts originating in the Pacific Ocean travel northeast toward the Cascade Mountains. As fronts approach the North Cascades they are forced upward by the peaks of the Cascade Range, causing them to drop their moisture in the form of rain or snowfall onto the Cascades (orographic lift). As a result, the west side of the North Cascades experiences higher precipitation than the east side, especially during the winter months in the form of snowfall. During winter months, weather is usually cloudy, but, due to high pressure systems over the Pacific Ocean that intensify during summer months, there is often little or no cloud cover during the summer. The months July through September offer the most favorable weather. However, smoke from distant wildfires may potentially reduce visibility, and smoky summer conditions have been increasing with climate change.

== Geology ==
The North Cascades feature some of the most rugged topography in the Cascade Range with craggy peaks, spires, ridges, and deep glacial valleys. Geological events occurring many years ago created the diverse topography and drastic elevation changes over the Cascade Range leading to the various climate differences.

The history of the formation of the Cascade Mountains dates back millions of years ago to the late Eocene Epoch. With the North American Plate overriding the Pacific Plate, episodes of volcanic igneous activity persisted. In addition, small fragments of the oceanic and continental lithosphere called terranes created the North Cascades about 50 million years ago.

During the Pleistocene period dating back over two million years ago, glaciation advancing and retreating repeatedly scoured the landscape leaving deposits of rock debris. The U-shaped cross section of the river valleys is a result of recent glaciation. Uplift and faulting in combination with glaciation have been the dominant processes which have created the tall peaks and deep valleys of the North Cascades area.

== See also ==
- Geography of the North Cascades
- Geology of the Pacific Northwest
