= McKay Ridge =

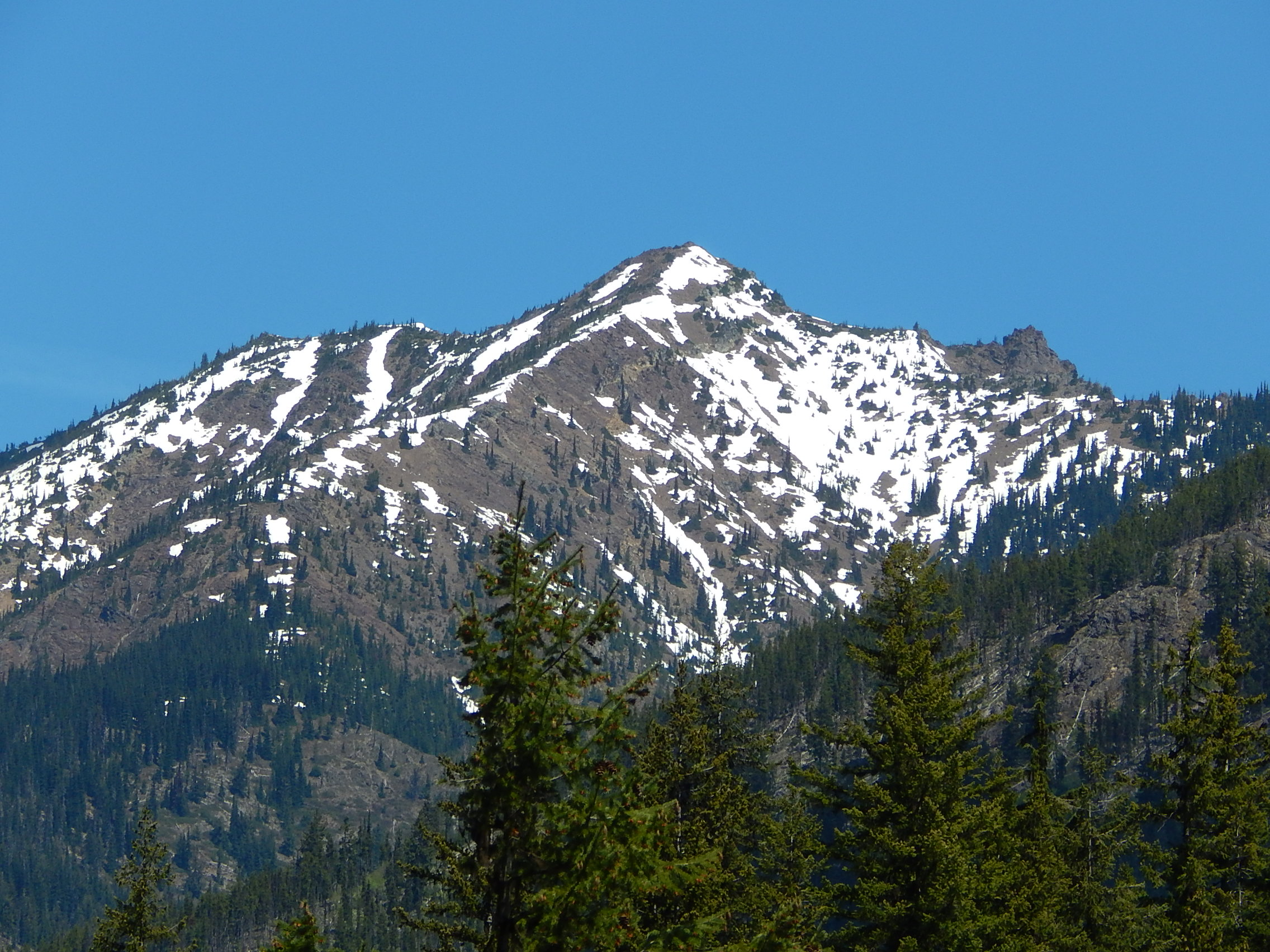
- McKay Ridge seen from East Creek Trail

Highest point
- Elevation: 7,000+ ft (2,130+ m)
- Prominence: 800 ft (244 m)
- Parent peak: Majestic Mountain (7,530 ft)
- Isolation: 1.77 mi (2.85 km)
- Coordinates: 48°41′28″N 120°50′47″W

Geography
- Location within Washington (state) Location within the United States
- Interactive map of McKay Ridge
- Country: United States
- State: Washington
- County: Whatcom
- Parent range: North Cascades
- Topo map: USGS Azurite Peak

Climbing
- Easiest route: Scrambling

McKay Ridge is a 7,000+ ft (2,130+ m) ridge located in Whatcom County in Washington state. It is part of the Okanogan Range which is a sub-range of the North Cascades. It's situated north of the North Cascades Highway on land administered by the Okanogan–Wenatchee National Forest. The nearest higher peak is Majestic Mountain, 1.6 miles (2.6 km) to the northeast. Precipitation runoff from the ridge drains to Ross Lake via tributaries of the Skagit River.

== Climate ==
McKay Ridge is located in the marine west coast climate zone of western North America. Weather fronts originating in the Pacific Ocean travel northeast toward the Cascade Mountains. As fronts approach the North Cascades, they are forced upward by the range (orographic lift), causing them to drop their moisture in the form of rain or snow onto the Cascades. As a result, the west side of the North Cascades experiences high precipitation, especially during the winter months in the form of snowfall. Because of maritime influence, snow tends to be wet and heavy, resulting in high avalanche danger. During winter months, weather is usually cloudy, but due to high pressure systems over the Pacific Ocean that intensify during summer months, there is often little or no cloud cover during the summer.

== Geology ==
The North Cascades features some of the most rugged topography in the Cascade Range with craggy peaks and ridges and deep glacial valleys. Geological events occurring many years ago created the diverse topography and drastic elevation changes over the Cascade Range leading to the various climate differences. These climate differences lead to vegetation variety defining the ecoregions in this area.

The history of the formation of the Cascade Mountains dates back millions of years ago to the late Eocene Epoch. With the North American Plate overriding the Pacific Plate, episodes of volcanic igneous activity persisted. In addition, small fragments of the oceanic and continental lithosphere called terranes created the North Cascades about 50 million years ago.

During the Pleistocene period dating back over two million years ago, glaciation advancing and retreating repeatedly scoured the landscape leaving deposits of rock debris. The U-shaped cross section of the river valleys is a result of recent glaciation. Uplift and faulting in combination with glaciation have been the dominant processes which have created the tall peaks and deep valleys of the North Cascades area.

== Gallery ==
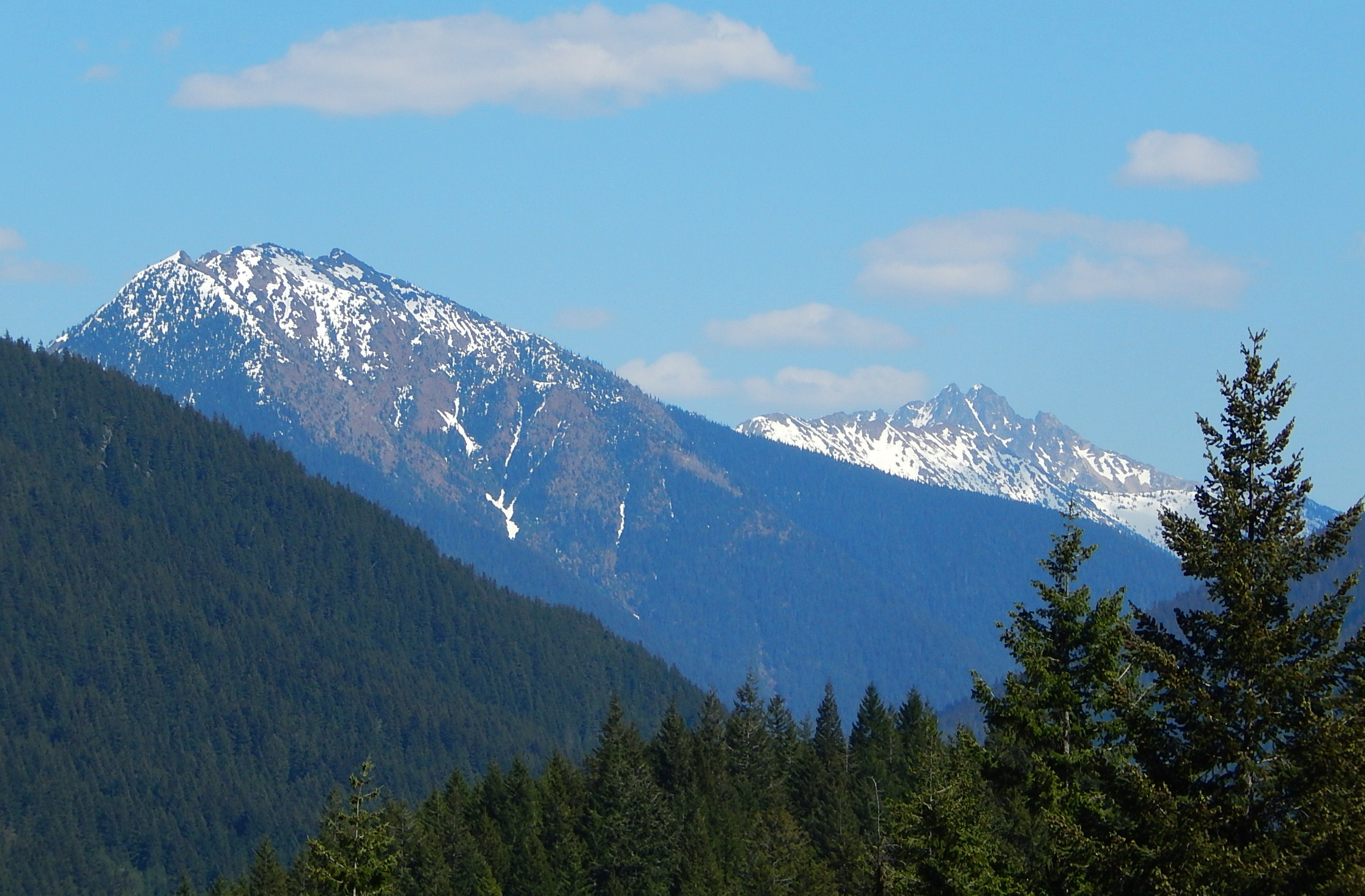
McKay Ridge (left) and Azurite Peak seen from North Cascades Highway

== See also ==
Geography of the North Cascades
