= Majestic Mountain =

Mountain in Washington (state), United States

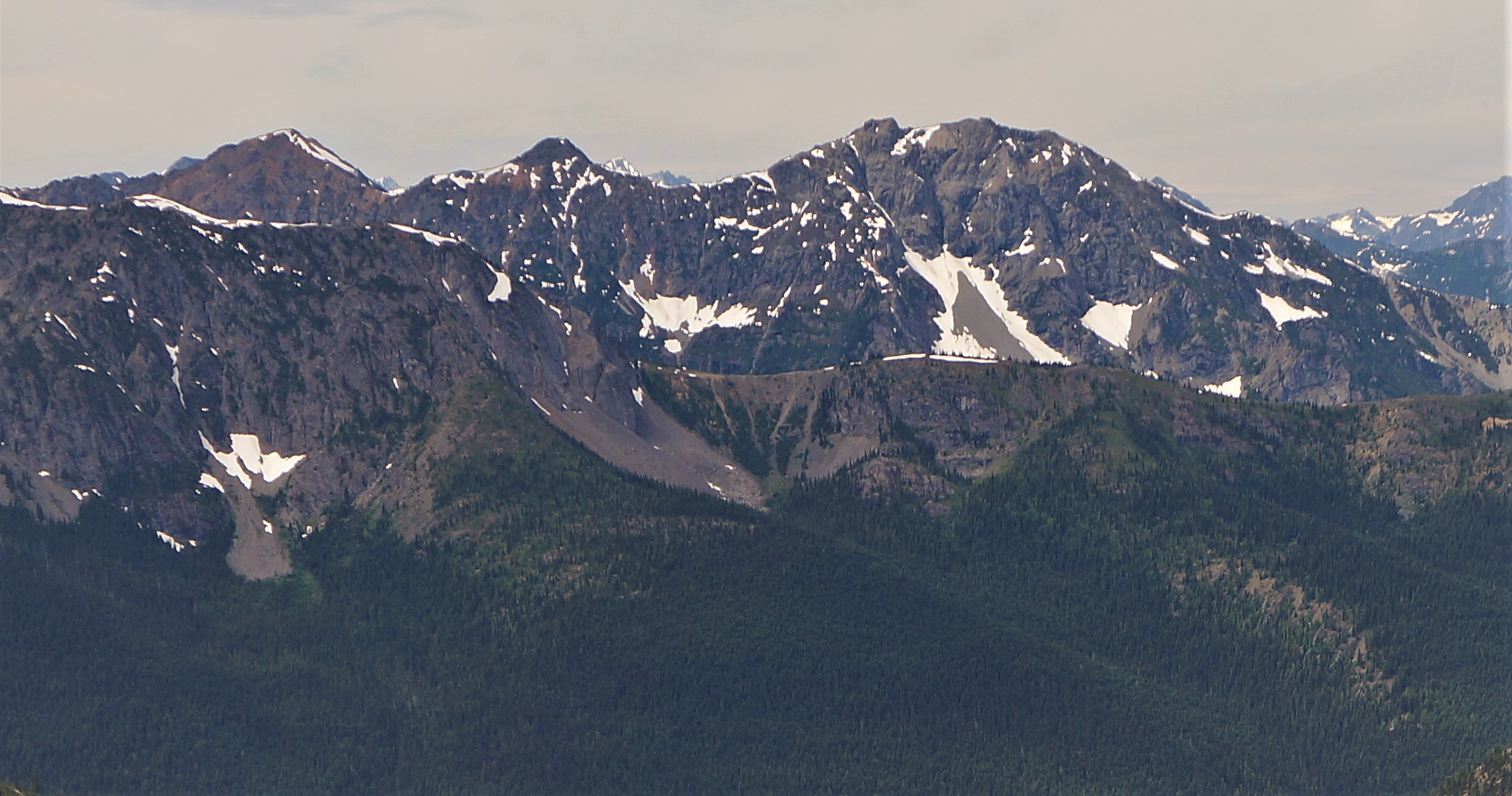
- Majestic's north peak (right); Camera pointed southwest

Highest point
- Elevation: 7,530 ft (2,295 m)
- Prominence: 720 ft (219 m)
- Parent peak: Mount Ballard (8,340 ft)
- Isolation: 1.75 mi (2.82 km)
- Coordinates: 48°41′09″N 120°48′00″W

Dimensions
- Length: 5 mi (8.0 km) North-South
- Width: 2 mi (3.2 km) East-West

Geography
- Location within Washington (state) Location within the United States
- Interactive map of Majestic Mountain
- Country: United States
- State: Washington
- County: Whatcom
- Protected area: Okanogan–Wenatchee National Forest
- Parent range: Cascade Range; North Cascades; Okanogan Range
- Topo map: USGS Azurite Peak

Climbing
- Easiest route: class 2

Majestic Mountain is a 7,530-foot-elevation (2,295-meter) mountain summit located in Whatcom County in Washington state.

== Description ==
Majestic Mountain is part of the Okanogan Range which is a sub-range of the North Cascades, and is situated on land administered by the Okanogan–Wenatchee National Forest. The mountain is a long ridge paralleling Mill Creek, and has several subpeaks, the highest of which is the North Peak (7,510 ft). The nearest higher peak is Mount Ballard, 1.9 miles (3.1 km) to the east. Topographic relief is significant as the summit rises 3,300 feet (1,000 meters) above Mill Creek in approximately three-quarters mile. Precipitation runoff from the mountain drains to Ross Lake via Mill Creek and other tributaries of the Skagit River. The Azurite Mine, a gold and silver mine, was located east of the summit along Mill Creek, and over $900,000 in gold was extracted there in the 1930s. The Gold Hill Mine, located on the southwest slope in the East Creek valley, and the North American Mine at the north end of the mountain also produced gold and silver.

== Climate ==
Majestic Mountain is located in the marine west coast climate zone of western North America. Weather fronts originating in the Pacific Ocean travel east toward the Cascade Mountains. As fronts approach the North Cascades, they are forced upward by the peaks of the Cascade Range (orographic lift), causing them to drop their moisture in the form of rain or snowfall onto the Cascades. As a result, the west side of the North Cascades experiences high precipitation, especially during the winter months in the form of snowfall. Because of maritime influence, snow tends to be wet and heavy, resulting in avalanche danger. During winter months weather is usually cloudy, but due to high pressure systems over the Pacific Ocean that intensify during summer months, there is often little or no cloud cover during the summer.

== Geology ==
The North Cascades features some of the most rugged topography in the Cascade Range with craggy peaks and ridges and deep glacial valleys. Geological events occurring many years ago created the diverse topography and drastic elevation changes over the Cascade Range leading to the various climate differences. These climate differences lead to vegetation variety defining the ecoregions in this area.

The history of the formation of the Cascade Mountains dates back millions of years ago to the late Eocene Epoch. With the North American Plate overriding the Pacific Plate, episodes of volcanic igneous activity persisted. In addition, small fragments of the oceanic and continental lithosphere called terranes created the North Cascades about 50 million years ago.

During the Pleistocene period dating back over two million years ago, glaciation advancing and retreating repeatedly scoured the landscape leaving deposits of rock debris. The U-shaped cross section of the river valleys is a result of recent glaciation. Uplift and faulting in combination with glaciation have been the dominant processes which have created the tall peaks and deep valleys of the North Cascades area.

== See also ==
Geography of the North Cascades
