= Azurite Peak =

Mountain in Washington (state), United States

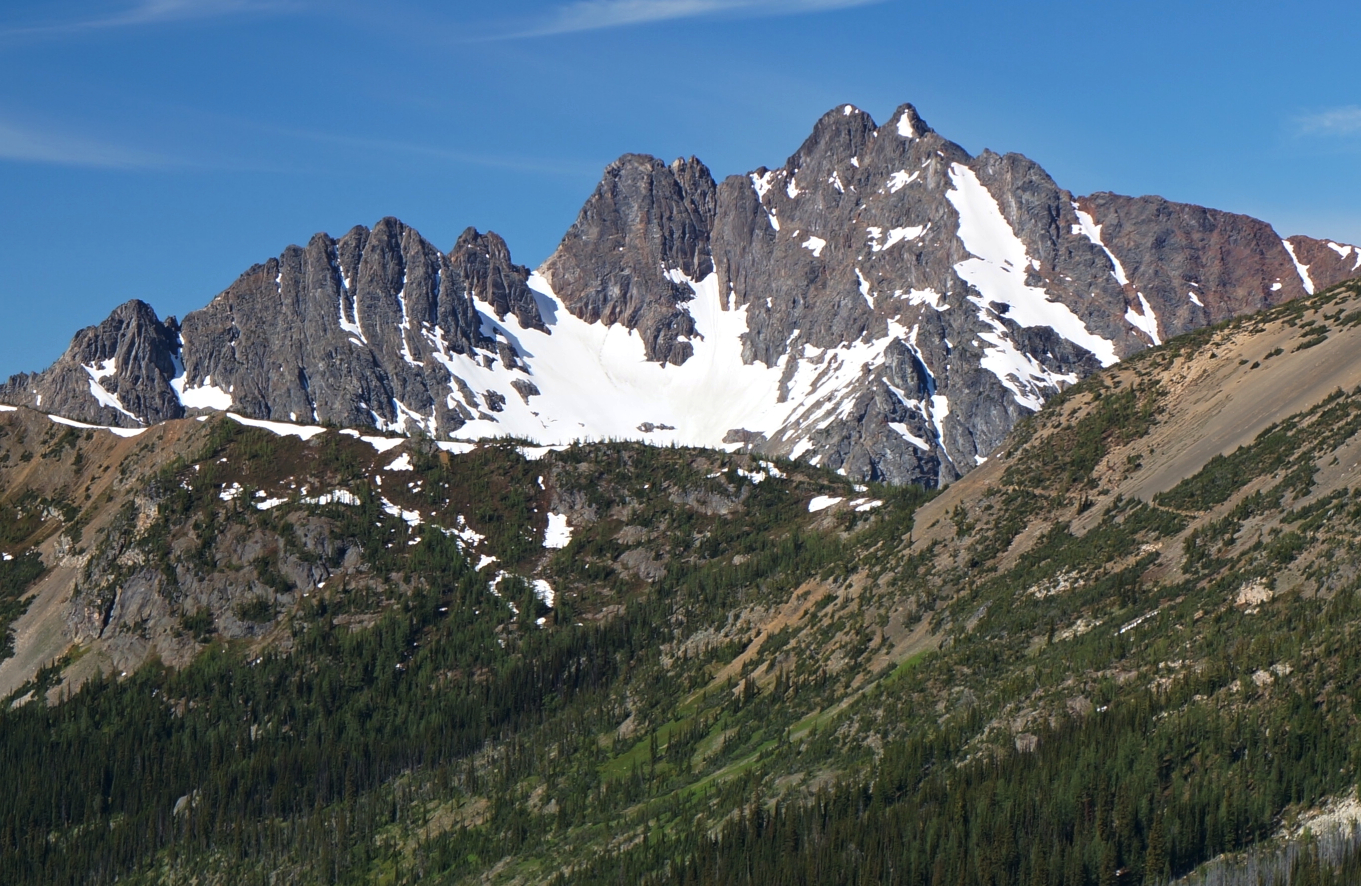
- Azurite Peak seen from northeast

Highest point
- Elevation: 8,434 ft (2,571 m)
- Prominence: 1,940 ft (591 m)
- Parent peak: Tower Mountain (8,444 ft)
- Isolation: 5.20 mi (8.37 km)
- Coordinates: 48°39′26″N 120°45′08″W

Naming
- Etymology: Azurite

Geography
- Location within Washington (state) Location within the United States
- Interactive map of
- Country: United States
- State: Washington
- County: Okanogan, Skagit, Whatcom
- Protected area: Okanogan–Wenatchee National Forest
- Parent range: Okanogan Range; North Cascades
- Topo map: USGS Azurite Peak

Climbing
- First ascent: 1933, Hermann Ulrichs, Sidney Shmerling
- Easiest route: Scrambling, class 4

Azurite Peak is an 8,434-foot (2,571-metre) double-summit mountain located at the common boundary point of Okanogan County, Skagit County, and Whatcom County in Washington state. It is part of the Okanogan Range which is a sub-range of the North Cascades Range. Azurite Peak ranks as the 81st-highest summit in the state. Azurite Peak is situated north of Azurite Pass on land administered by the Okanogan–Wenatchee National Forest. The nearest higher neighbor is Tower Mountain, 5.24 miles (8.43 km) to the south-southeast, and Mount Ballard lies 1.97 miles (3.17 km) to the north. Remnants of a small pocket glacier are found on the east aspect. Precipitation runoff from the peak drains north into tributaries of the Skagit River, and south into the Methow River. Topographic relief is significant as the summit rises over 3,000 feet (910 meters) above Mill Creek in one mile (1.6 km). The Pacific Crest Trail traverses the base of Azurite Peak.

== Climate ==
Azurite Peak is located in the marine west coast climate zone of western North America. Most weather fronts originating in the Pacific Ocean travel northeast toward the Cascade Mountains. As fronts approach the North Cascades, they are forced upward by the peaks of the Cascade Range (orographic lift), causing them to drop their moisture in the form of rain or snowfall onto the Cascades. As a result, the west side of the North Cascades experiences high precipitation, especially during the winter months in the form of snowfall. Because of maritime influence, snow tends to be wet and heavy, resulting in high avalanche danger. During winter months, weather is usually cloudy, but due to high pressure systems over the Pacific Ocean that intensify during summer months, there is often little or no cloud cover during the summer.

== Geology ==
The North Cascades features some of the most rugged topography in the Cascade Range with craggy peaks, spires, ridges, and deep glacial valleys. Geological events occurring many years ago created the diverse topography and drastic elevation changes over the Cascade Range leading to the various climate differences.

The history of the formation of the Cascade Mountains dates back millions of years ago to the late Eocene Epoch. With the North American Plate overriding the Pacific Plate, episodes of volcanic igneous activity persisted. In addition, small fragments of the oceanic and continental lithosphere called terranes created the North Cascades about 50 million years ago.

During the Pleistocene period dating back over two million years ago, glaciation advancing and retreating repeatedly scoured the landscape leaving deposits of rock debris. The U-shaped cross section of the river valleys is a result of recent glaciation. Uplift and faulting in combination with glaciation have been the dominant processes which have created the tall peaks and deep valleys of the North Cascades area.

== Gallery ==
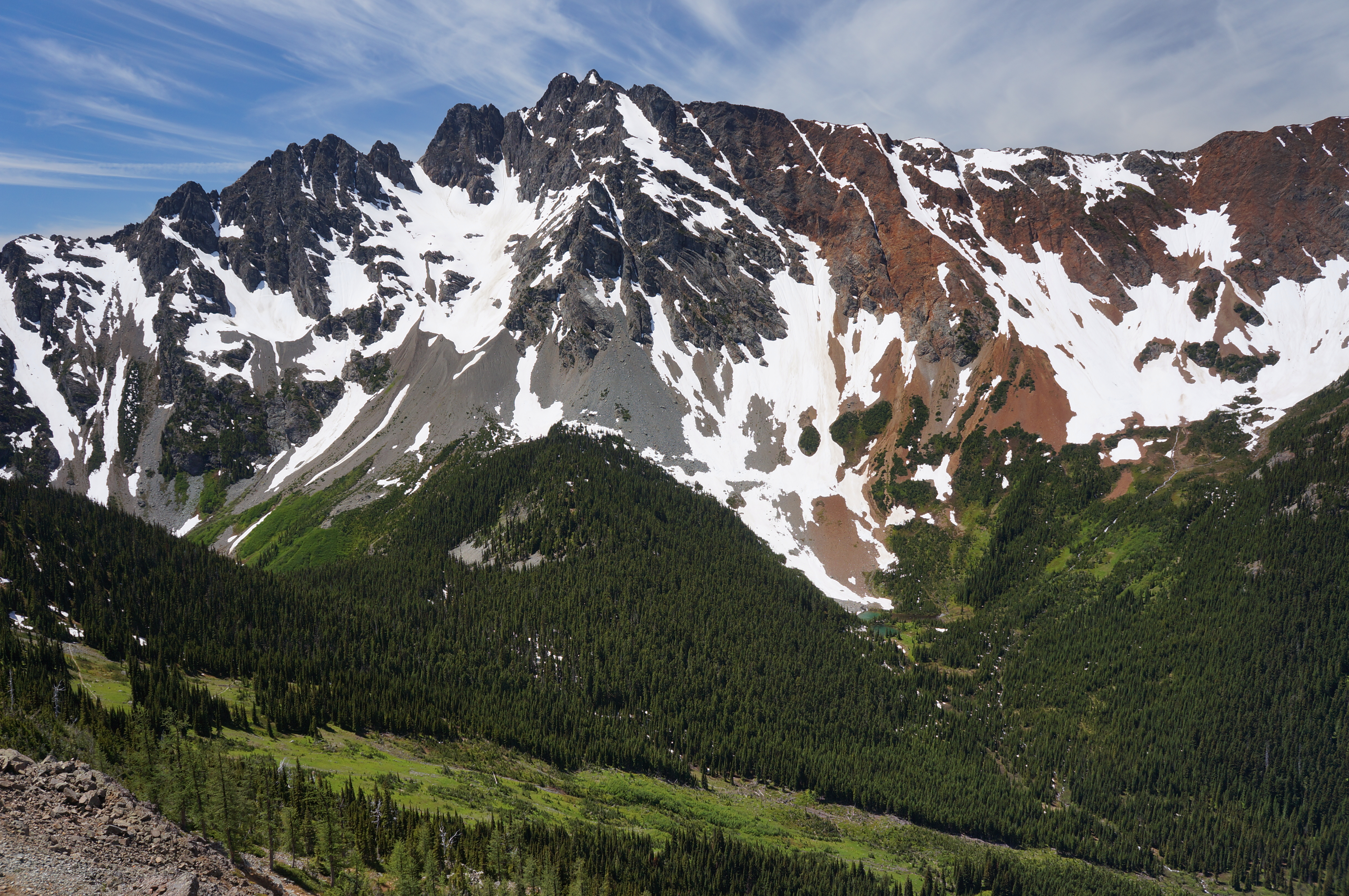
Azurite Peak from east

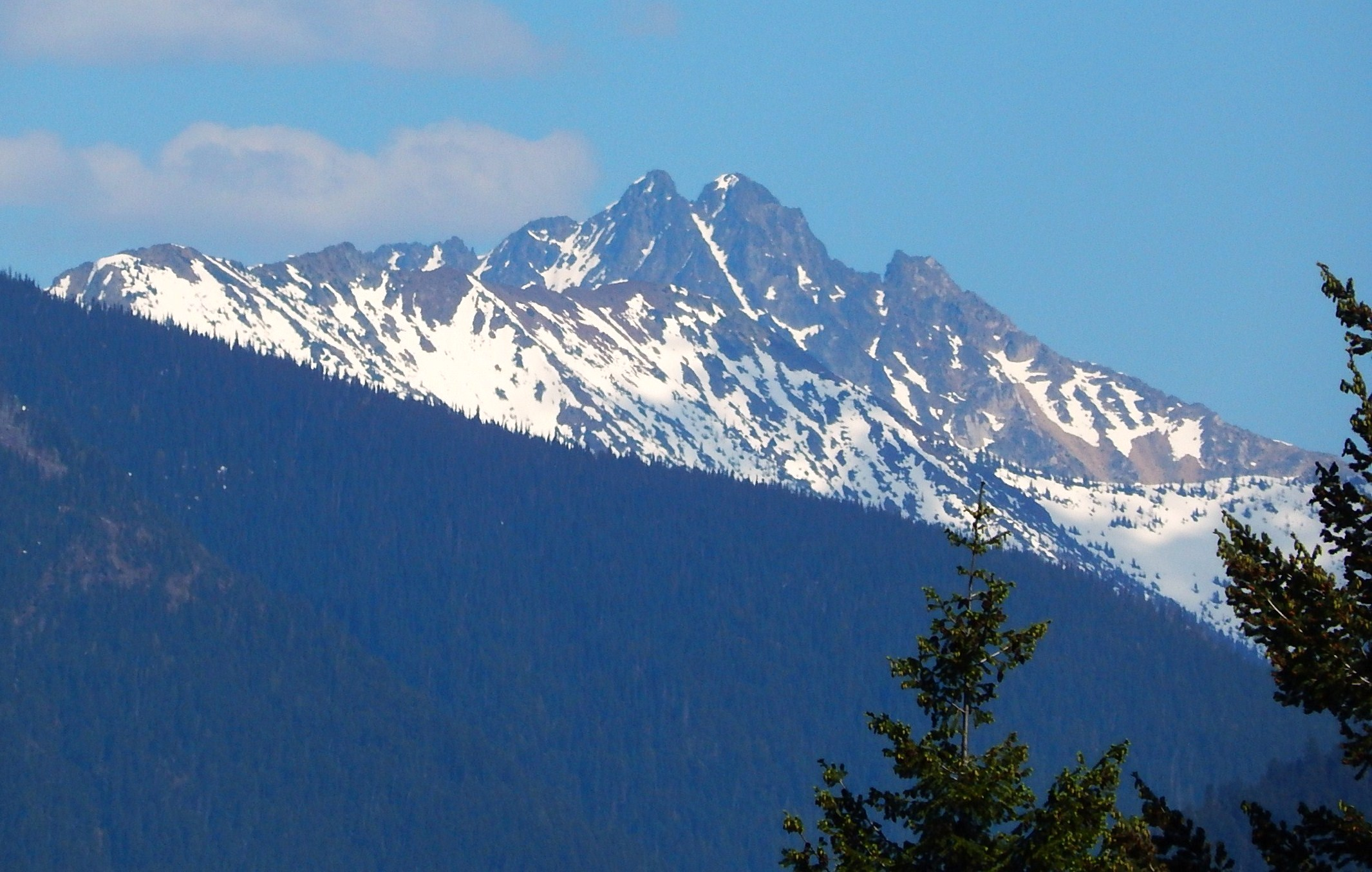
Azurite Peak seen from North Cascades Highway near Ross Lake

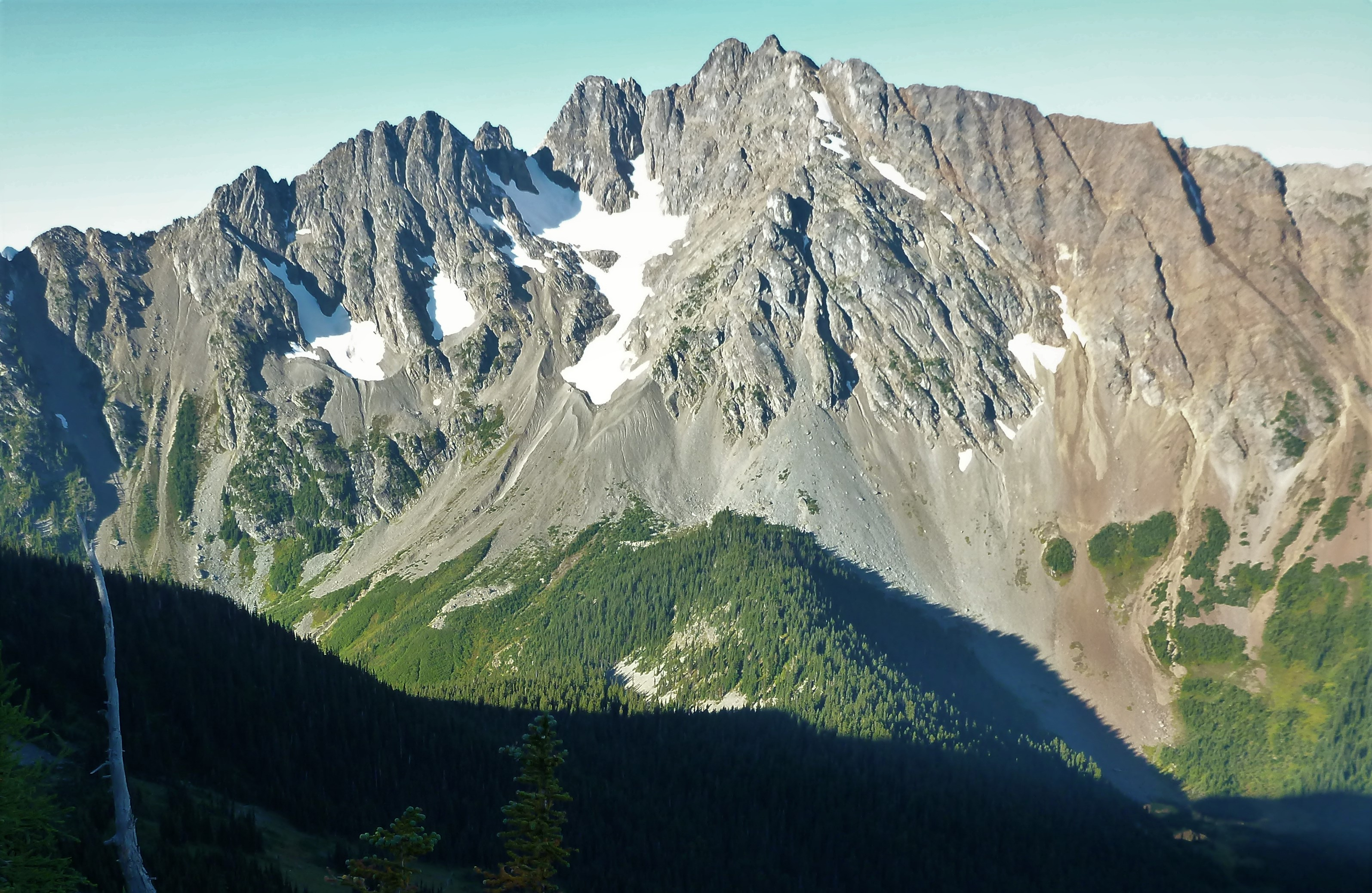
Azurite Peak from northeast

== See also ==
- Geography of the North Cascades
