= Golden Horn (Washington) =

Mountain in Washington (state), United States

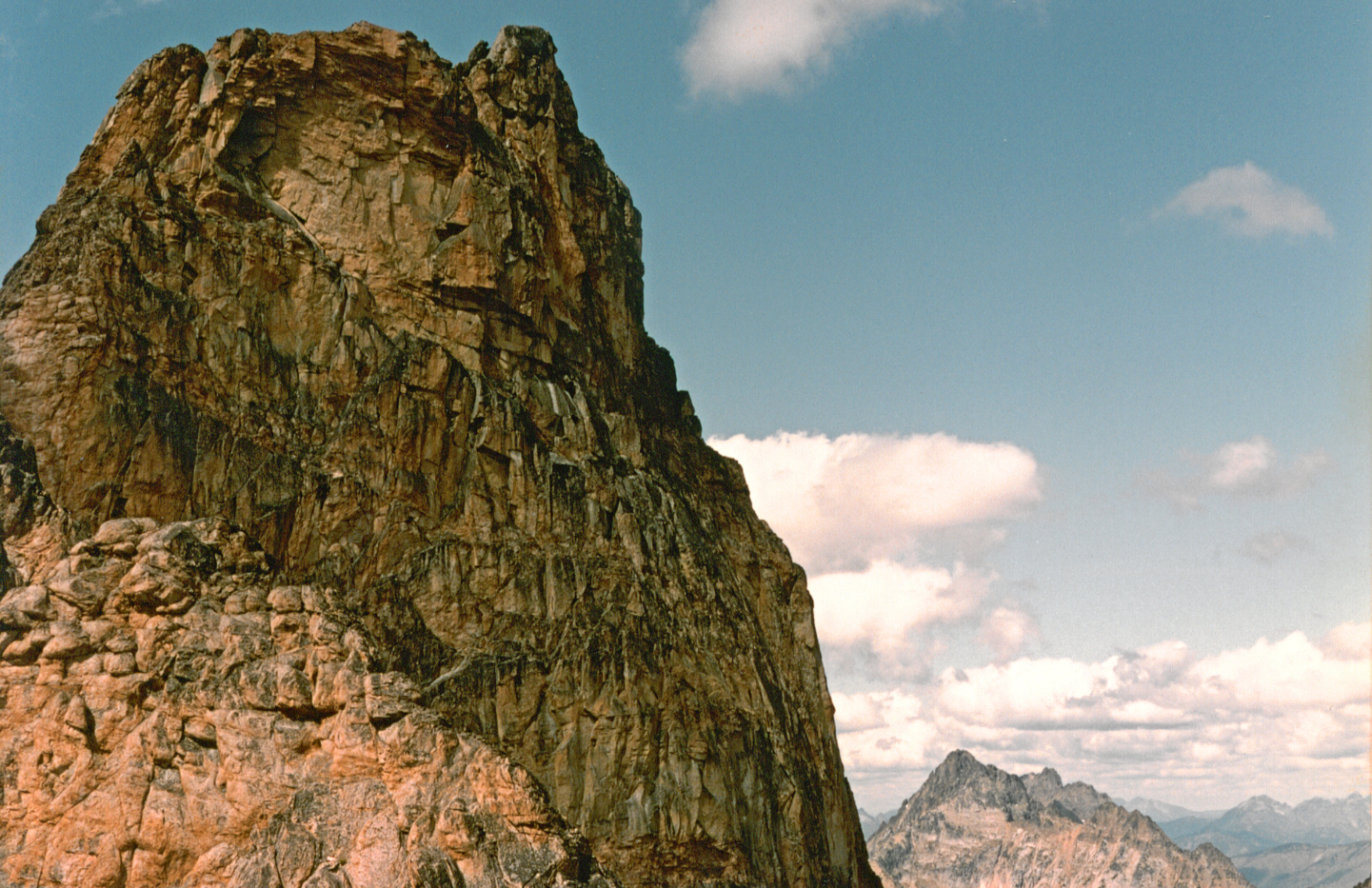
- Golden Horn summit

Highest point
- Elevation: 8,366 ft (2,550 m)
- Prominence: 1,126 ft (343 m)
- Parent peak: Tower Mountain (8,366 ft)
- Isolation: 1.66 mi (2.67 km)
- Coordinates: 48°36′13″N 120°43′58″W

Geography
- Location within Washington (state) Location within the United States
- Interactive map of Golden Horn
- Country: United States
- State: Washington
- County: Okanogan
- Protected area: Okanogan National Forest
- Parent range: Okanogan Range; North Cascades
- Topo map: USGS Washington Pass

Geology
- Rock age: 45 million years old
- Rock type: (Rapakivi texture) granite

Climbing
- First ascent: Fred Beckey in 1946
- Easiest route: Southwest route, class 3

Golden Horn is an 8,366-foot (2,550-metre) mountain summit located in Okanogan County in Washington, United States. It is part of the Okanogan Range which is a sub-range of the North Cascades Range. Golden Horn is situated north of Methow Pass at headwaters of the Methow River, on land administered by the Okanogan–Wenatchee National Forest. It ranks as the 101st-highest summit in Washington. The nearest higher neighbor is Tower Mountain, 1.67 miles (2.69 km) to the southeast. Topographic relief is significant as the summit rises approximately 3,366 feet (1,026 meters) above the West Fork Methow River in one mile (1.6 km). The first ascent of Golden Horn was made by Fred Beckey, Keith Rankin, and Charles Welsh on September 18, 1946.

== Climate ==
Golden Horn is located in the marine west coast climate zone of western North America. Most weather fronts originating in the Pacific Ocean travel northeast toward the Cascade Mountains. As fronts approach the North Cascades, they are forced upward by the peaks of the Cascade Range (orographic lift), causing them to drop their moisture in the form of rain or snowfall onto the Cascades. As a result, the west side of the North Cascades experiences high precipitation, especially during the winter months in the form of snowfall. Due to maritime influence, snow tends to be wet and heavy, resulting in high avalanche danger. During winter months, weather is usually cloudy, but due to high pressure systems over the Pacific Ocean that intensify during summer months, there is often little or no cloud cover during the summer.

== Geology ==
The North Cascades features some of the most rugged topography in the Cascade Range with craggy peaks, ridges, and deep glacial valleys. Geological events occurring many years ago created the diverse topography and drastic elevation changes over the Cascade Range leading to various climate differences.

The history of the formation of the Cascade Mountains dates back millions of years ago to the late Eocene Epoch. With the North American Plate overriding the Pacific Plate, episodes of volcanic igneous activity persisted. In addition, small fragments of the oceanic and continental lithosphere called terranes created the North Cascades about 50 million years ago. Like many of the peaks of the Washington Pass area, Golden Horn is carved from Rapakivi texture granite of the Golden Horn batholith.

During the Pleistocene period dating back over two million years ago, glaciation advancing and retreating repeatedly scoured the landscape leaving deposits of rock debris. The U-shaped cross section of the river valleys is a result of recent glaciation. Uplift and faulting in combination with glaciation have been the dominant processes which have created the tall peaks and deep valleys of the North Cascades area.

== Gallery ==
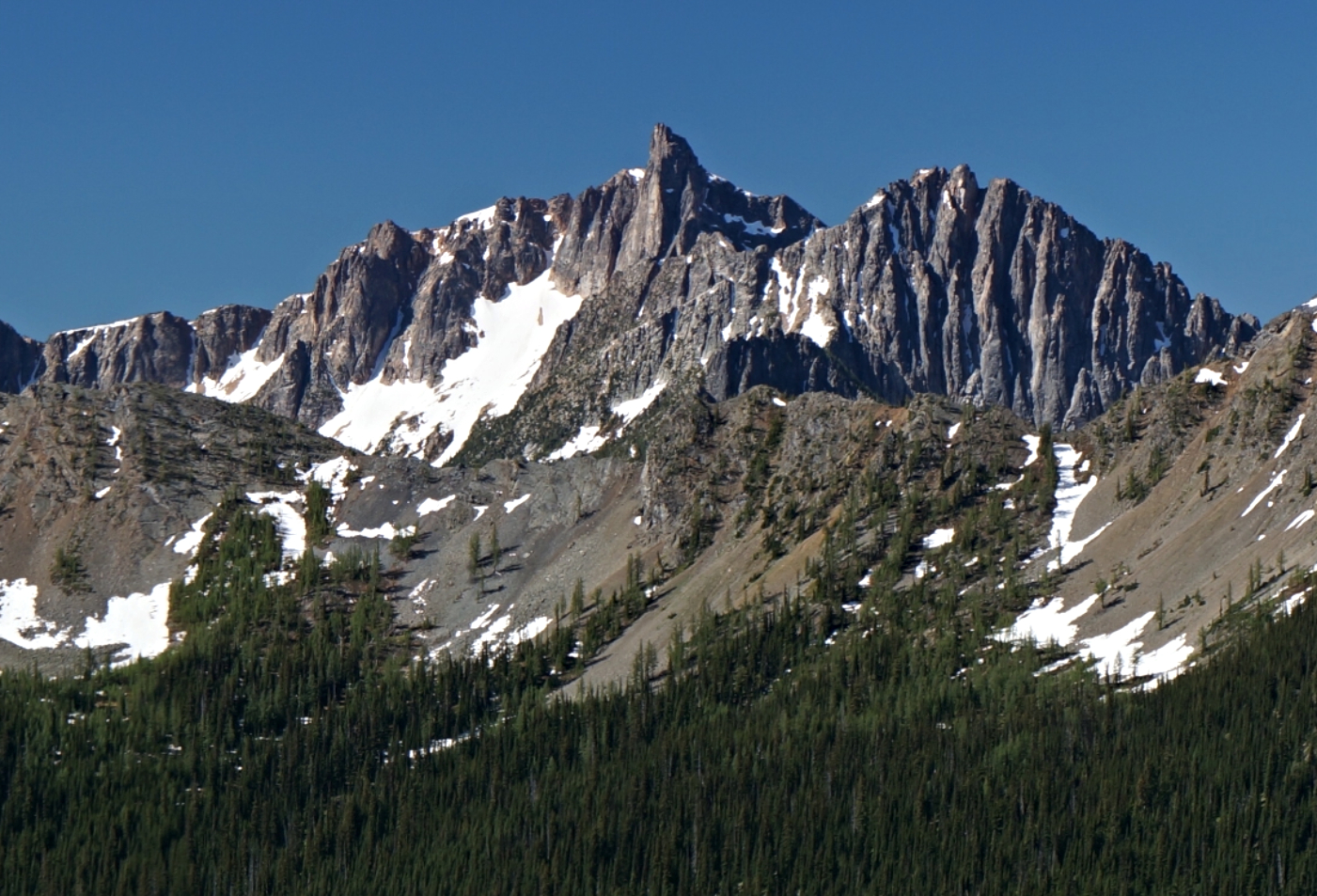
Golden Horn and Holliway Mountain (right) seen from the north

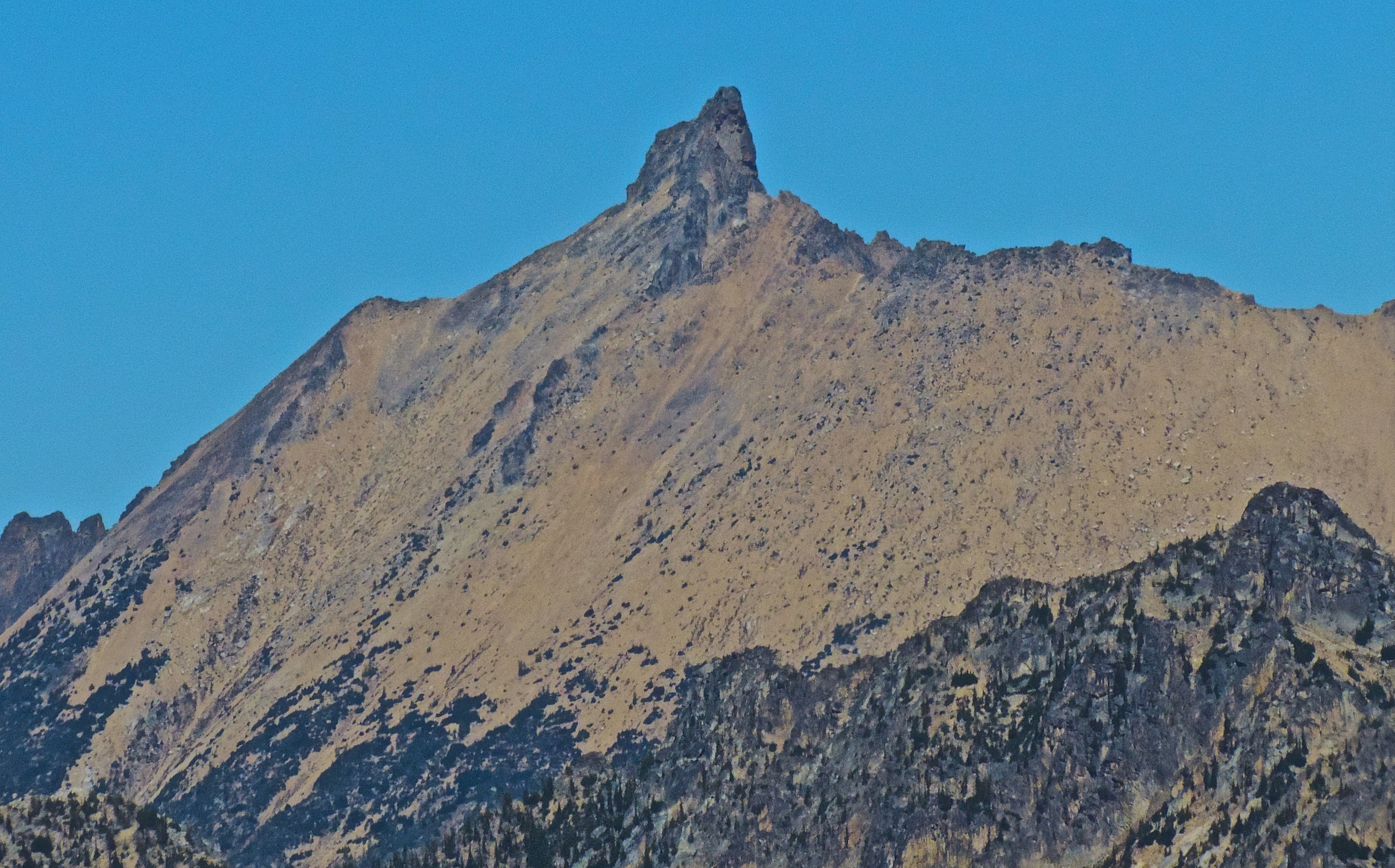
Golden Horn, south aspect

== See also ==
- Geography of the North Cascades
- Geology of the Pacific Northwest
