= Mount Ballard (Washington) =

Mountain in Washington (state), United States

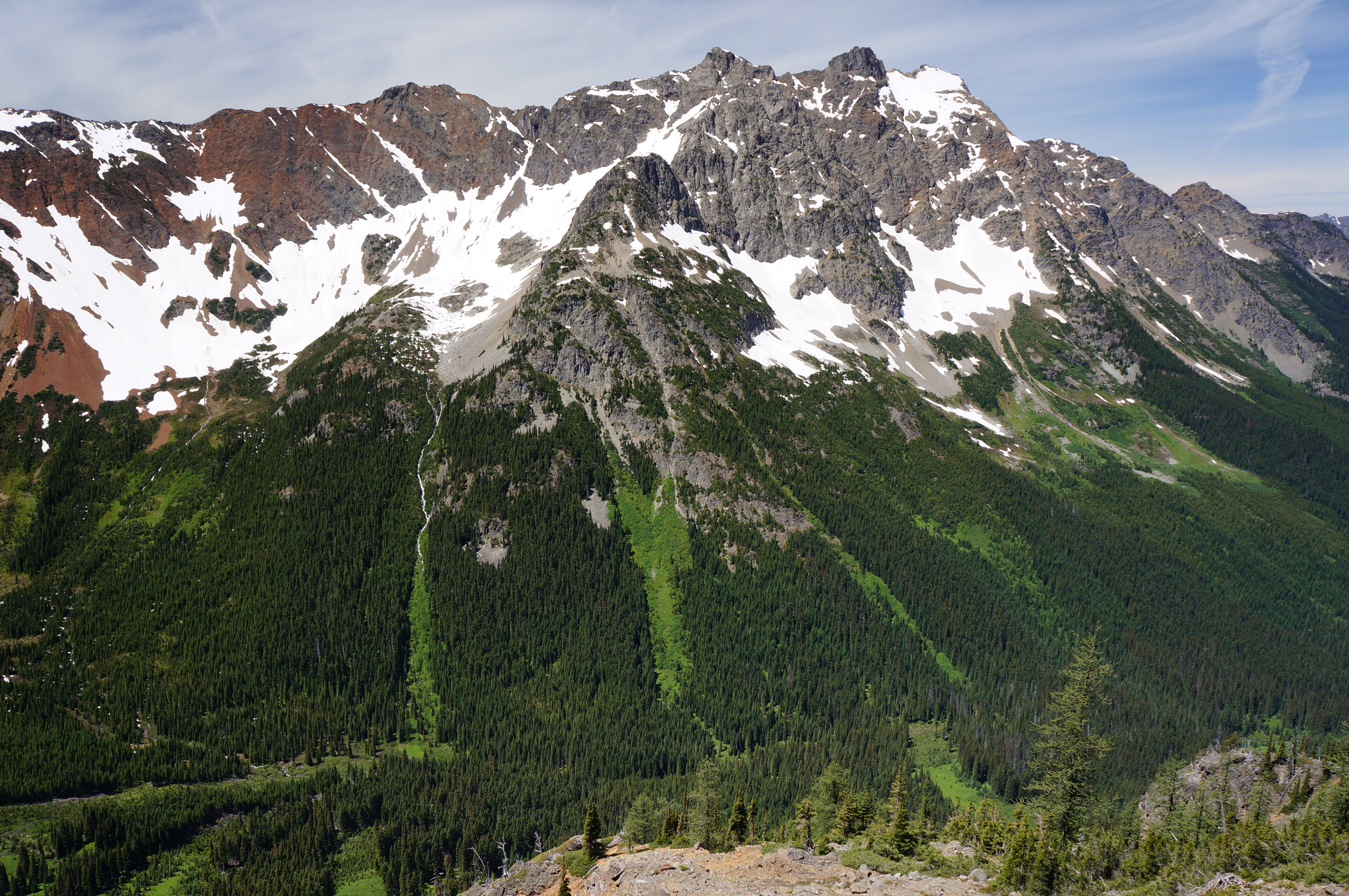
- Mount Ballard seen from PCT at Grasshopper Pass

Highest point
- Elevation: 8,371 ft (2,551 m)
- Prominence: 834 ft (254 m)
- Parent peak: Azurite Peak (8,434 ft)
- Isolation: 2.02 mi (3.25 km)
- Coordinates: 48°41′19″N 120°45′34″W

Geography
- Location within Washington (state) Location within the United States
- Interactive map of
- Country: United States
- State: Washington
- County: Whatcom
- Protected area: Okanogan–Wenatchee National Forest
- Parent range: North Cascades
- Topo map: USGS Azurite Peak

Climbing
- Easiest route: class 3 scrambling

Mount Ballard is an 8,371-foot (2,551-metre) double-summit mountain located in eastern Whatcom County of Washington state. It is part of the Okanogan Range which is a sub-range of the North Cascades Range, and the mountain is situated on land administered by the Okanogan–Wenatchee National Forest. Ballard ranks 84th on Washington's highest 100 peaks. The nearest higher neighbor is Azurite Peak, 2.04 miles (3.28 km) to the south. Precipitation runoff from Mount Ballard drains into Mill Creek and Slate Creek, both tributaries of the Skagit River. Topographic relief is significant as the summit rises approximately 4,000 feet (1,219 meters) above Mill Creek in one mile (1.6 km).

== Climate ==
Mount Ballard is located in the marine west coast climate zone of western North America. Most weather fronts originating in the Pacific Ocean travel northeast toward the Cascade Mountains. As fronts approach the North Cascades, they are forced upward by the peaks of the Cascade Range (orographic lift), causing them to drop their moisture in the form of rain or snowfall onto the Cascades. As a result, the west side of the North Cascades experiences high precipitation, especially during the winter months in the form of snowfall. Because of maritime influence, snow tends to be wet and heavy, resulting in high avalanche danger. During winter months, weather is usually cloudy, but due to high pressure systems over the Pacific Ocean that intensify during summer months, there is often little or no cloud cover during the summer.

== Geology ==
The North Cascades features some of the most rugged topography in the Cascade Range with craggy peaks, spires, ridges, and deep glacial valleys. Geological events occurring many years ago created the diverse topography and drastic elevation changes over the Cascade Range leading to the various climate differences.

The history of the formation of the Cascade Mountains dates back millions of years ago to the late Eocene Epoch. With the North American Plate overriding the Pacific Plate, episodes of volcanic igneous activity persisted. In addition, small fragments of the oceanic and continental lithosphere called terranes created the North Cascades about 50 million years ago.

During the Pleistocene period dating back over two million years ago, glaciation advancing and retreating repeatedly scoured the landscape leaving deposits of rock debris. The U-shaped cross section of the river valleys is a result of recent glaciation. Uplift and faulting in combination with glaciation have been the dominant processes which have created the tall peaks and deep valleys of the North Cascades area.

== See also ==
- List of mountain peaks of Washington (state)
- Geography of Washington (state)
- Geology of the Pacific Northwest
