= Cat Peak =

Mountain in Washington (state), United States

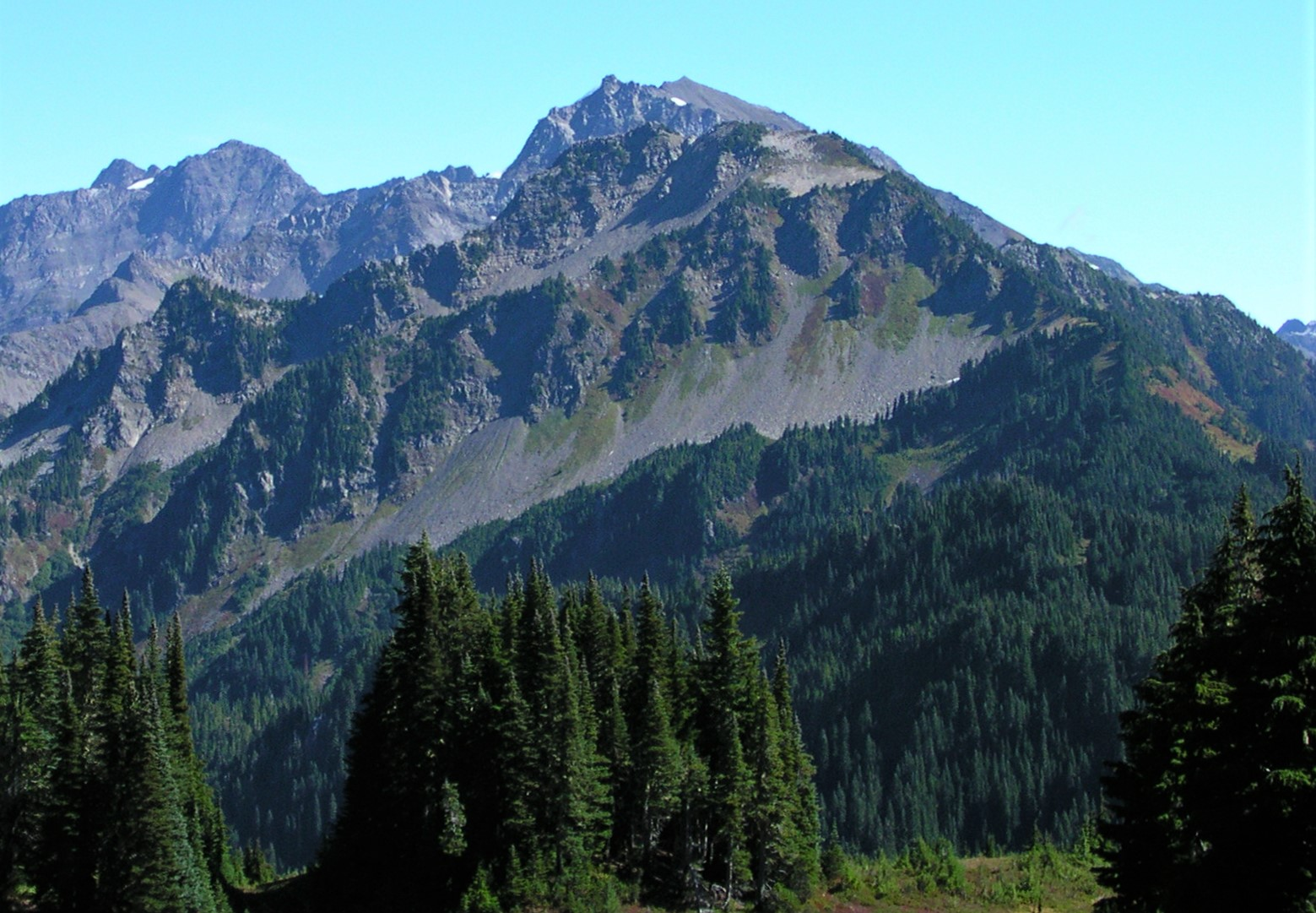
- West aspect, seen from High Divide (Mt. Carrie directly behind, and Mt. Fairchild to left)

Highest point
- Elevation: 5,940 ft (1,811 m)
- Prominence: 750 ft (229 m)
- Parent peak: Mount Carrie (6,995 ft)
- Isolation: 1.49 mi (2.40 km)
- Coordinates: 47°54′00″N 123°40′48″W

Geography
- Location within Washington (state) Location within the United States
- Country: United States
- State: Washington
- County: Clallam
- Protected area: Olympic National Park
- Parent range: Olympic Mountains; Bailey Range
- Topo map: USGS Mount Carrie

Geology
- Rock age: Eocene

Climbing
- First ascent: Unknown
- Easiest route: class 1 Hiking via High Divide Trail

Cat Peak is a 5,940-foot (1,811-metre) mountain summit within Olympic National Park in Clallam County of Washington state.

== Description ==
Set within the Daniel J. Evans Wilderness, Cat Peak is the westernmost peak of the Bailey Range, which is a subrange of the Olympic Mountains. With clear weather, the mountain can be seen by hikers from High Divide or Hurricane Hill. The nearest higher neighbor is Mount Carrie 1.24 mi (2.00 km) to the east-southeast, and Mount Olympus rises 6.84 mi (11.01 km) to the south. Precipitation runoff from the mountain drains north into Cat Creek which is a tributary of the Elwha River, and south into the Hoh River. Topographic relief is significant as the summit rises over 4,400 feet (1,340 m) above the Hoh River in approximately one mile.

== History ==
The mountain's name has been officially adopted by the U.S. Board on Geographic Names. The peak is named in association with Cat Creek, which heads on the peak. The creek was christened "Wildcat Creek" by the 1889–90 Seattle Press Expedition because an expedition member killed a bobcat on February 28, 1890, where the creek joins the Elwha River.

== Climate ==
Based on the Köppen climate classification, Cat Peak is located in the marine west coast climate zone of western North America. Weather fronts originating in the Pacific Ocean travel northeast toward the Olympic Mountains. As fronts approach, they are forced upward by the peaks (orographic lift), causing them to drop their moisture in the form of rain or snow. As a result, the Olympics experience high precipitation, especially during the winter months in the form of snowfall. Because of maritime influence, snow tends to be wet and heavy, resulting in high avalanche danger. During winter months weather is usually cloudy, but due to high pressure systems over the Pacific Ocean that intensify during summer months, there is often little or no cloud cover during the summer. The months June through October offer the most favorable weather for viewing and climbing.

== Geology ==
The Olympic Mountains are composed of obducted clastic wedge material and oceanic crust, primarily Eocene sandstone, turbidite, and basaltic oceanic crust. The mountains were sculpted during the Pleistocene era by erosion and glaciers advancing and retreating multiple times.

== Gallery ==
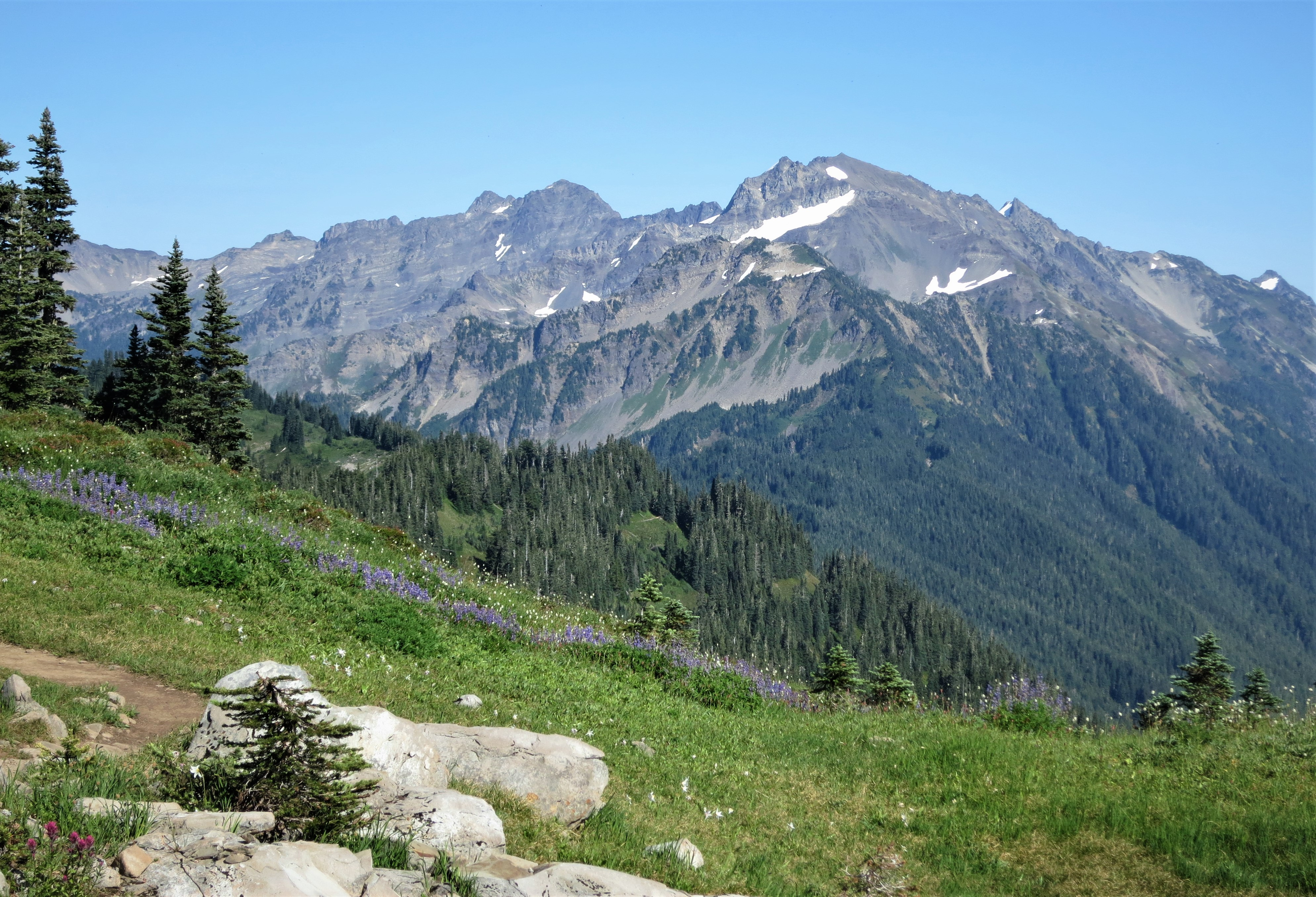
Cat Peak centered with Mts. Carrie and Fairchild looming behind

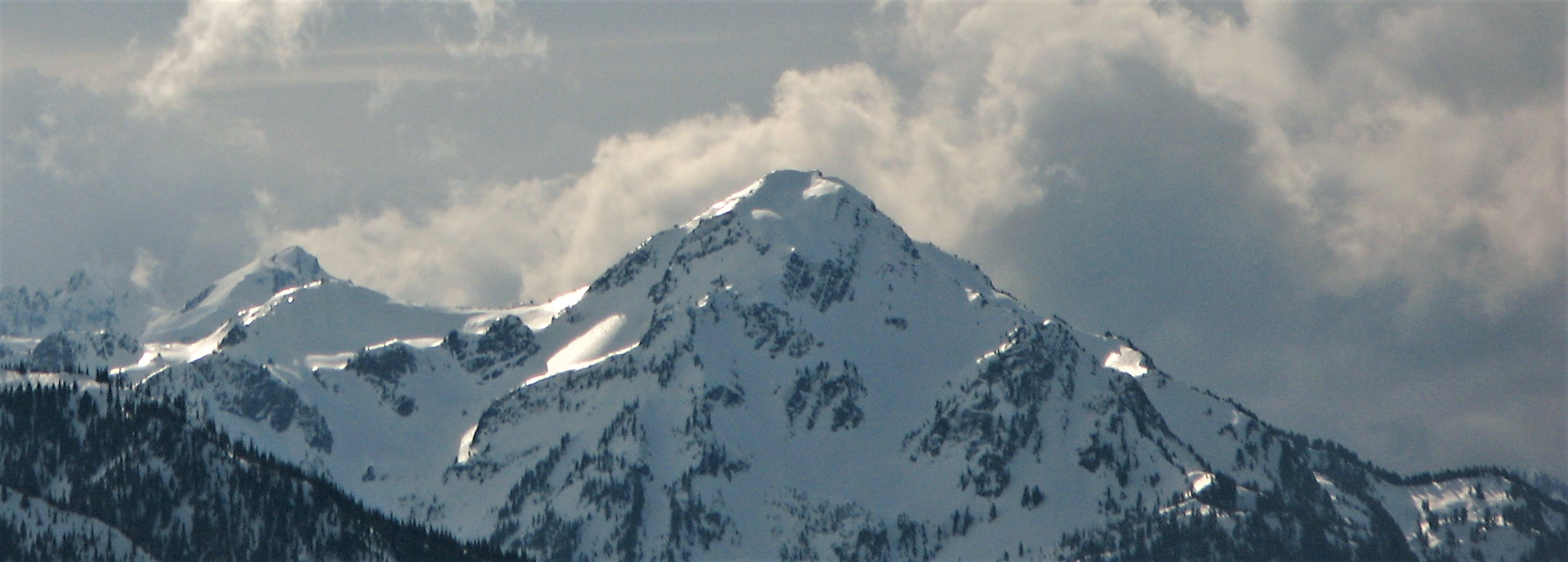
Northeast aspect in winter

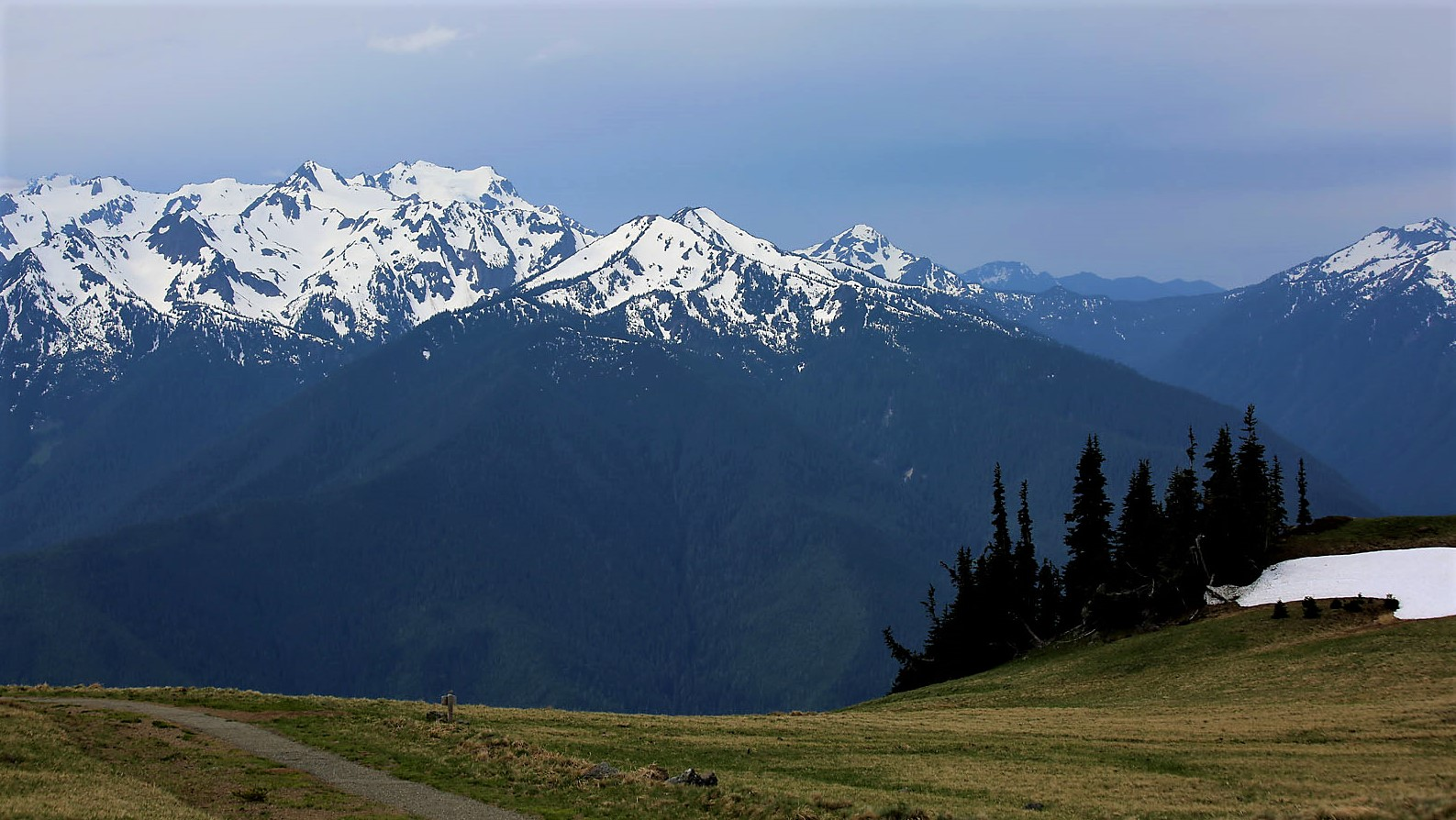
Mount Fitzhenry (centered) as seen from Hurricane Hill,
with Cat Peak behind right, and Mt. Carrie to left

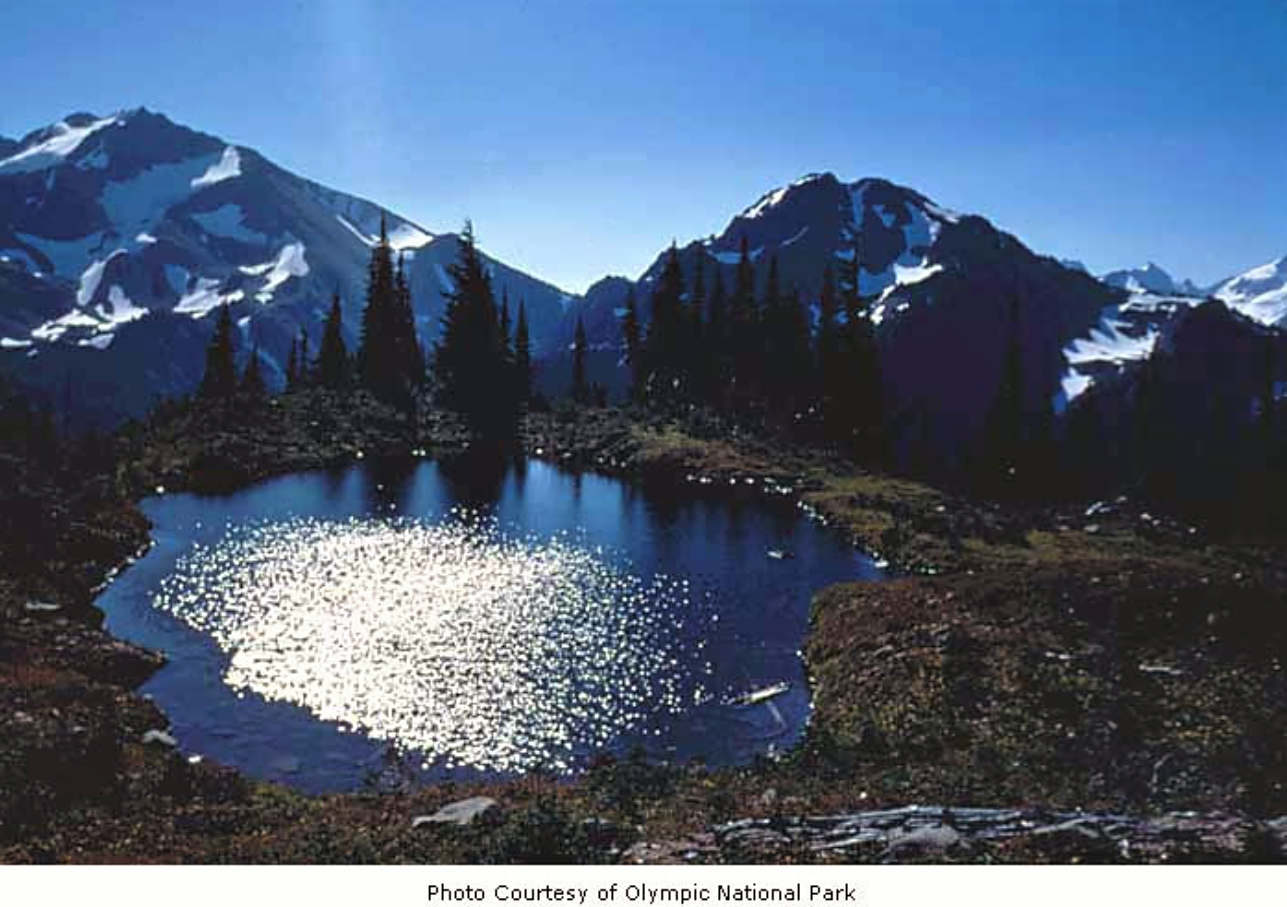
Mt. Carrie (left) and Cat Peak (right) seen from the north at a pond to the east of Haigs Lake

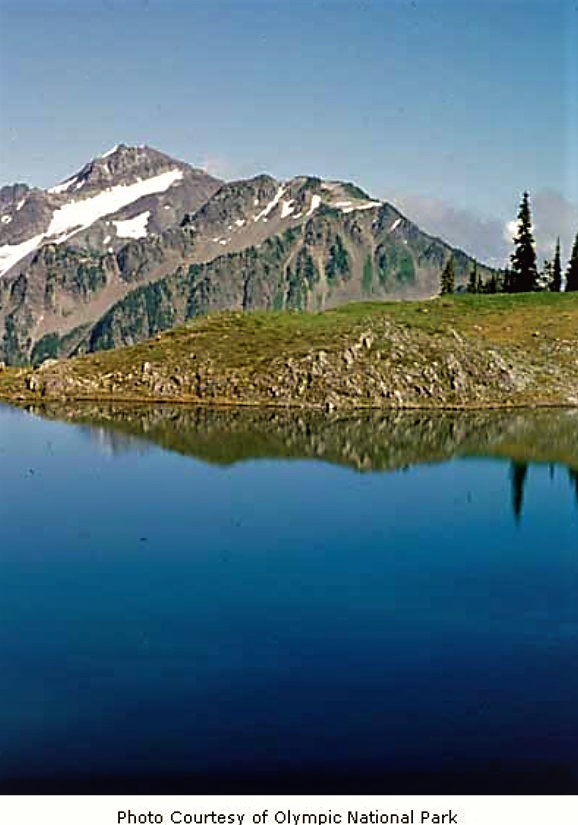
Mt. Carrie (left) and Cat Peak (centered) seen from the north at Haigs Lake

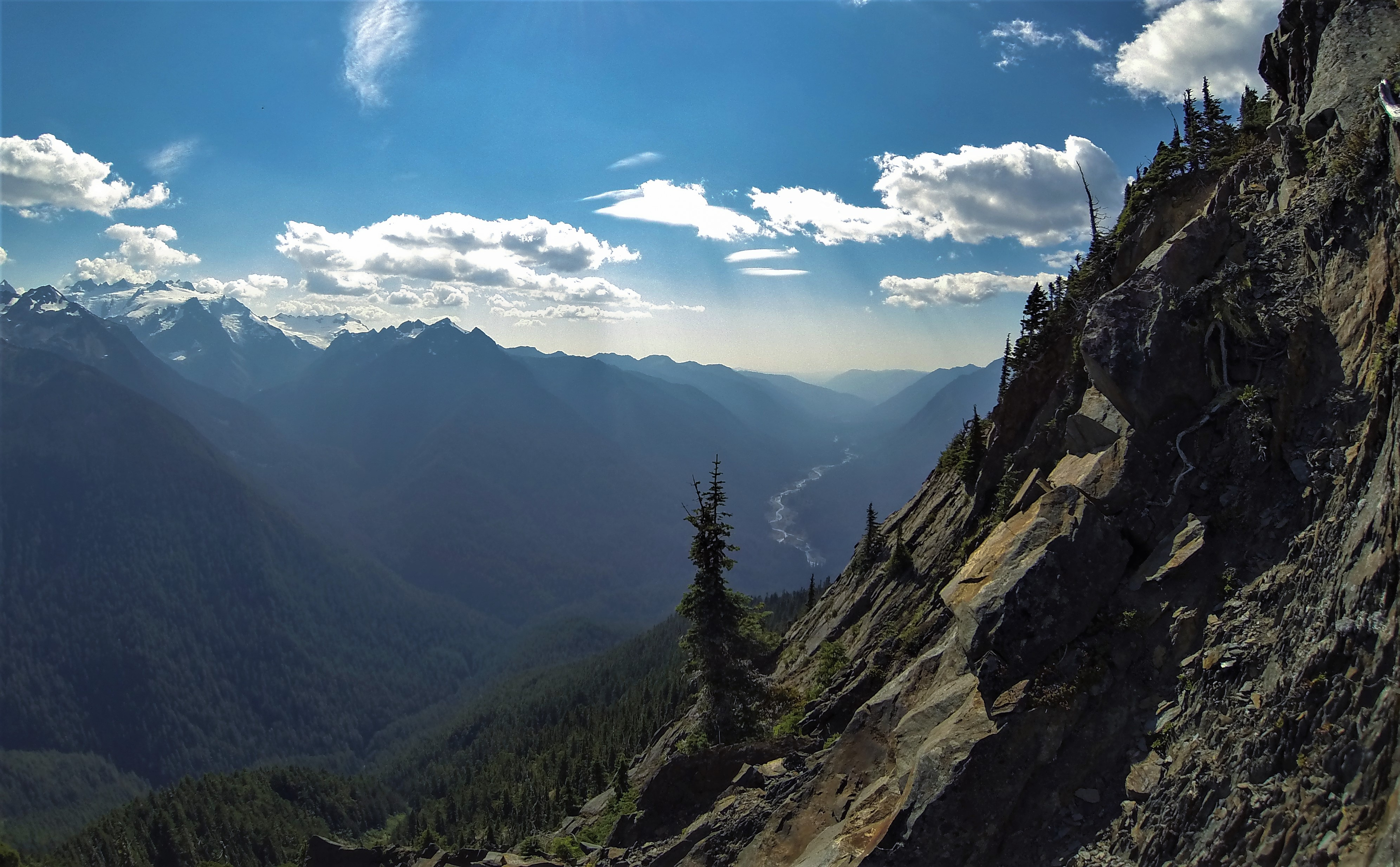
The Catwalk (right) on Cat Peak. Mount Olympus to left, and Hoh Valley centered.

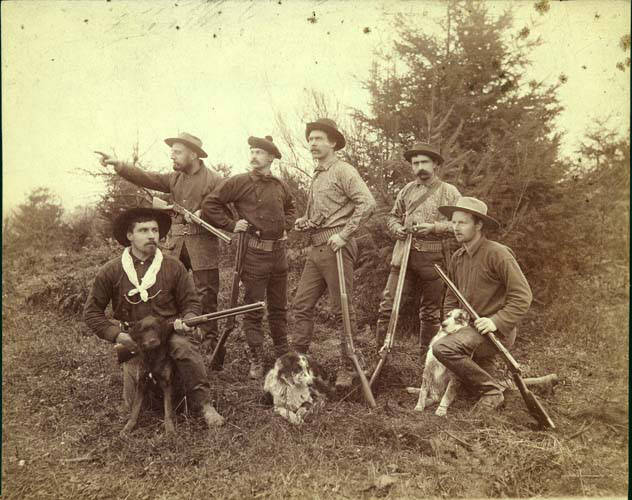
Seattle Press Expedition, 1889

== See also ==
- Olympic Mountains
- Geology of the Pacific Northwest
