= Ruth Peak =

Mountain in Washington (state), United States

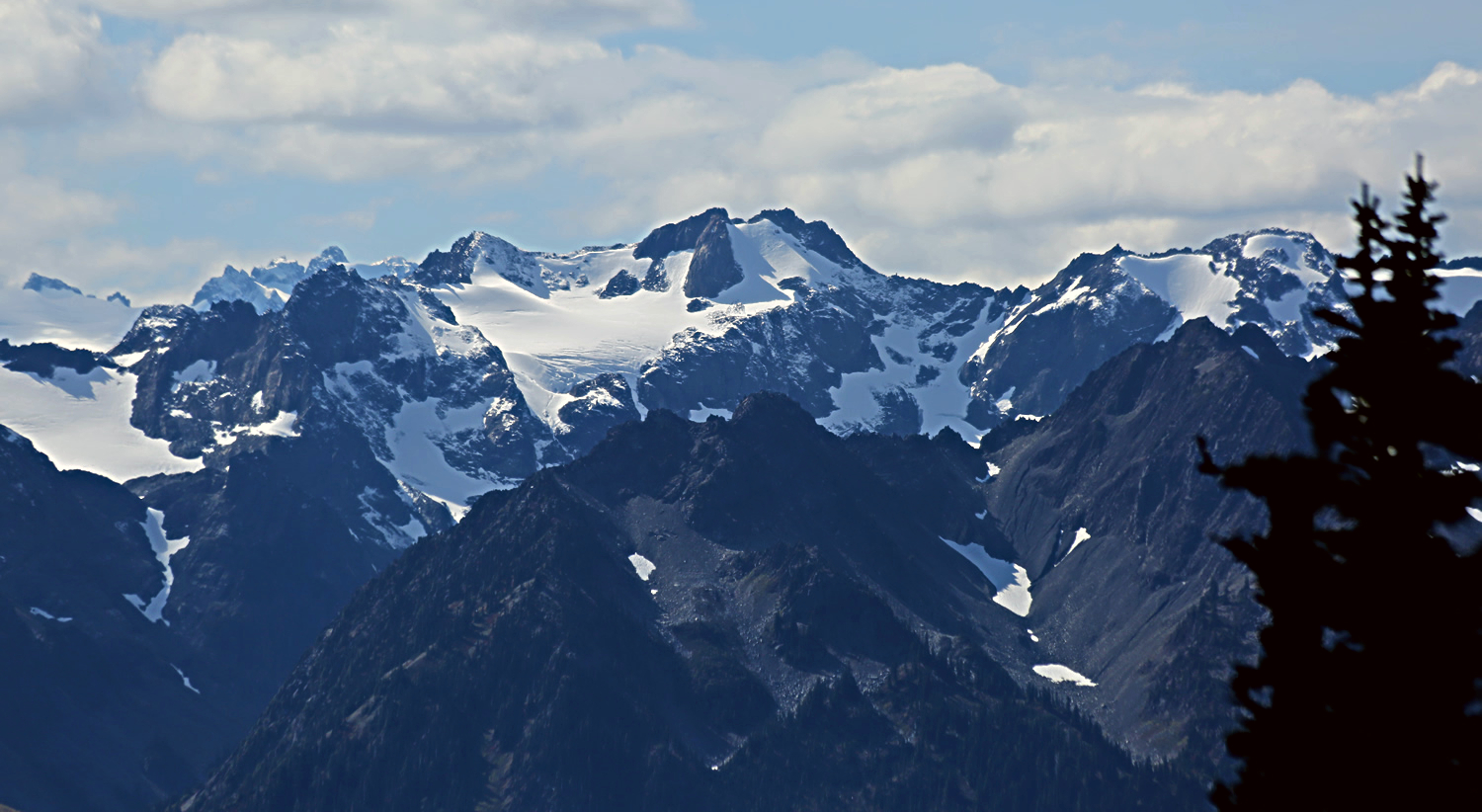
- Northeast aspect, from Hurricane Ridge

Highest point
- Elevation: 6,850 ft (2,090 m)
- Prominence: 250 ft (76 m)
- Parent peak: Mount Carrie (6,995 ft)
- Isolation: 0.9 mi (1.4 km)
- Coordinates: 47°53′13″N 123°37′59″W

Geography
- Location within Washington (state) Location within the United States
- Location: Olympic National Park; Clallam County, Washington, US
- Parent range: Olympic Mountains
- Topo map: USGS Mount Carrie

Geology
- Rock age: Eocene

Climbing
- First ascent: 1961
- Easiest route: class 3 scrambling

Ruth Peak is a 6,850+ ft (2,090+ m) glaciated mountain summit located within Olympic National Park in Clallam County of Washington state. Ruth Peak is the third-highest peak in the Bailey Range, which is a subrange of the Olympic Mountains. Its nearest higher neighbor is Mount Carrie, 0.91 mi (1.46 km) to the northwest, and Mount Fairchild is set 0.92 mi (1.48 km) to the north. In clear weather, the mountain can be seen from the visitor center at Hurricane Ridge. Precipitation runoff from the mountain drains into tributaries of the Hoh and Elwha Rivers. The first ascent of this peak was made in 1961 by Bert Brown, Roy Etten, and Victor Nelson.

== Climate ==
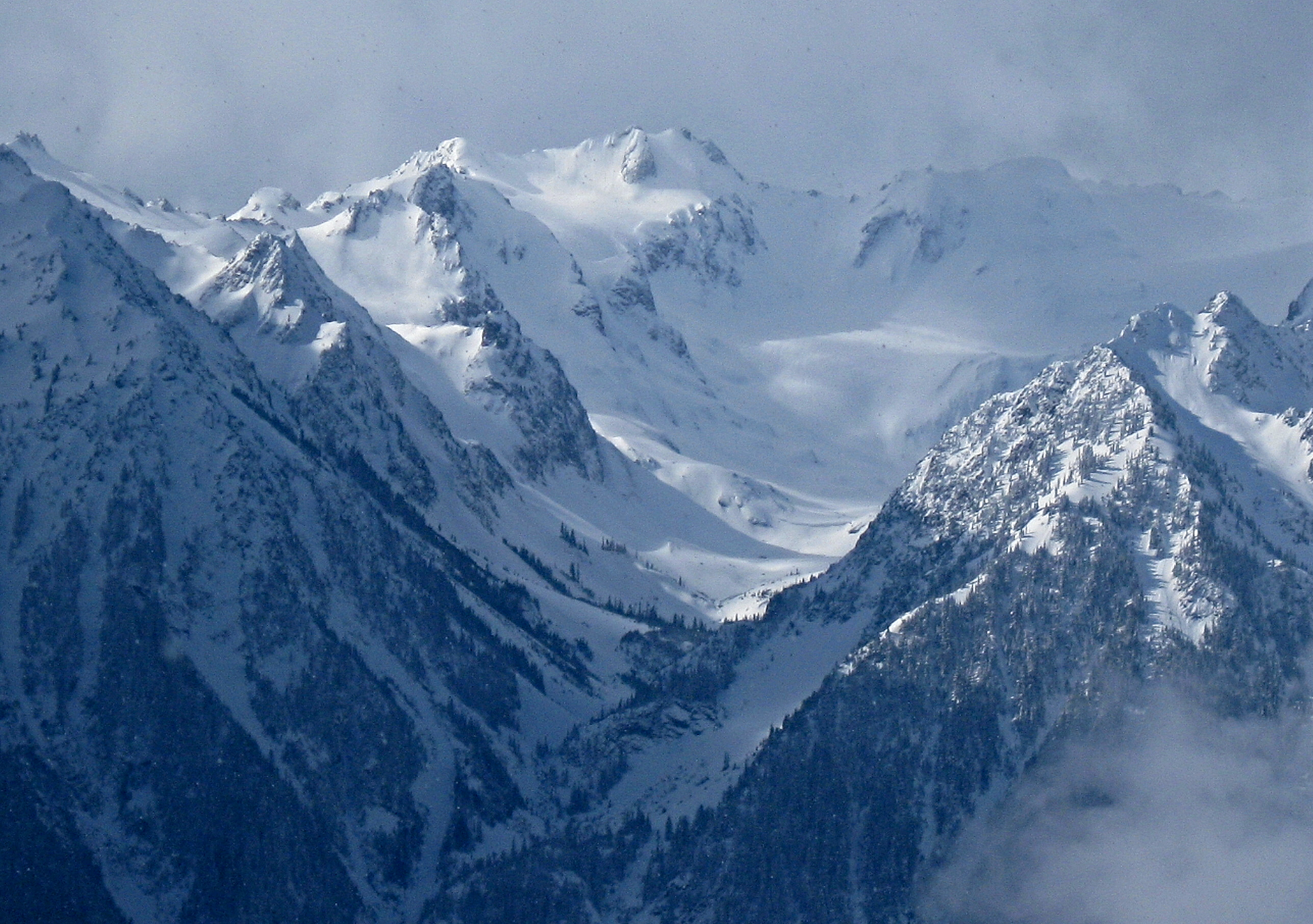
Ruth Peak in winter

Based on the Köppen climate classification, Ruth Peak is located in the marine west coast climate zone of western North America. This climate supports the Fairchild Glacier on its northeastern slope. Most weather fronts originate in the Pacific Ocean, and travel northeast toward the Olympic Mountains. As fronts approach, they are forced upward by the peaks of the Olympic Range, causing them to drop their moisture in the form of rain or snowfall (Orographic lift). As a result, the Olympics experience high precipitation, especially during the winter months. During winter months, weather is usually cloudy, but, due to high pressure systems over the Pacific Ocean that intensify during summer months, there is often little or no cloud cover during the summer. In terms of favorable weather, the best months for viewing and climbing are July through September.

== Geology ==
The Olympic Mountains are composed of obducted clastic wedge material and oceanic crust, primarily Eocene sandstone, turbidite, and basaltic oceanic crust. The mountains were sculpted during the Pleistocene era by erosion and glaciers advancing and retreating multiple times.

== See also ==
- Olympic Mountains
- Geology of the Pacific Northwest
- Stephen Peak

== Gallery ==
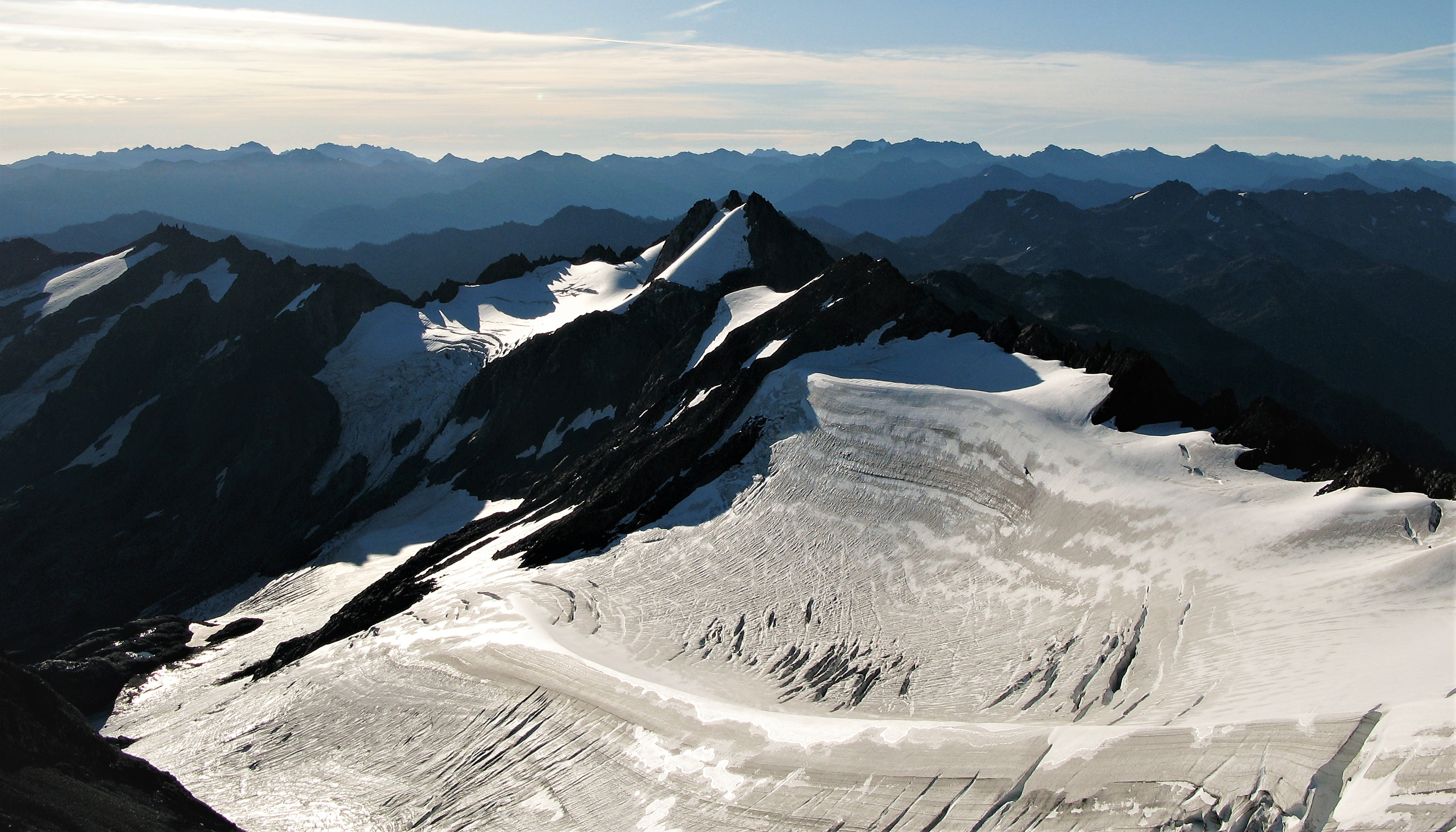
Ruth Peak and Fairchild Glacier seen from Mount Carrie

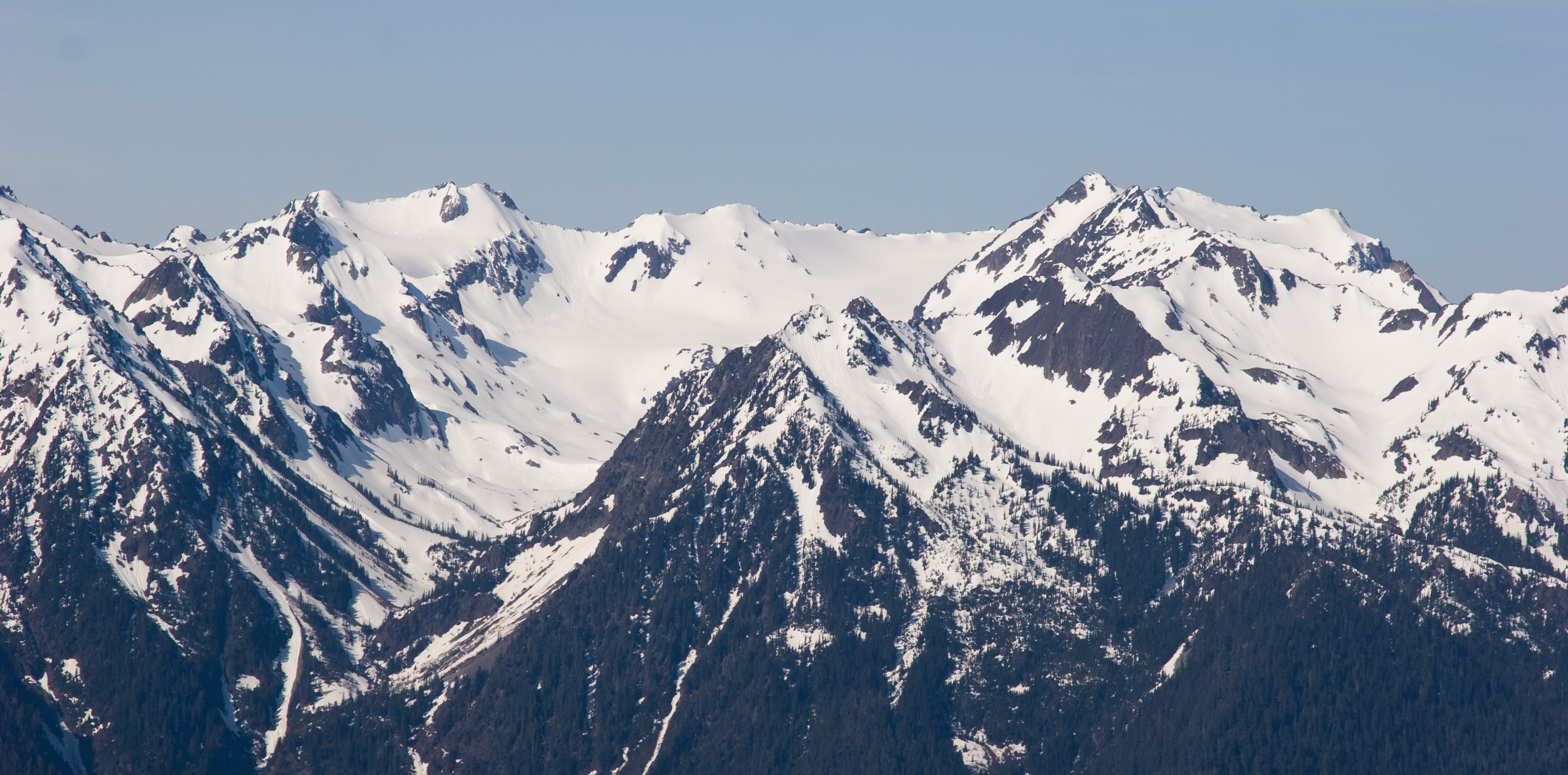
Ruth Peak (left), Mts. Fairchild and Carrie to right

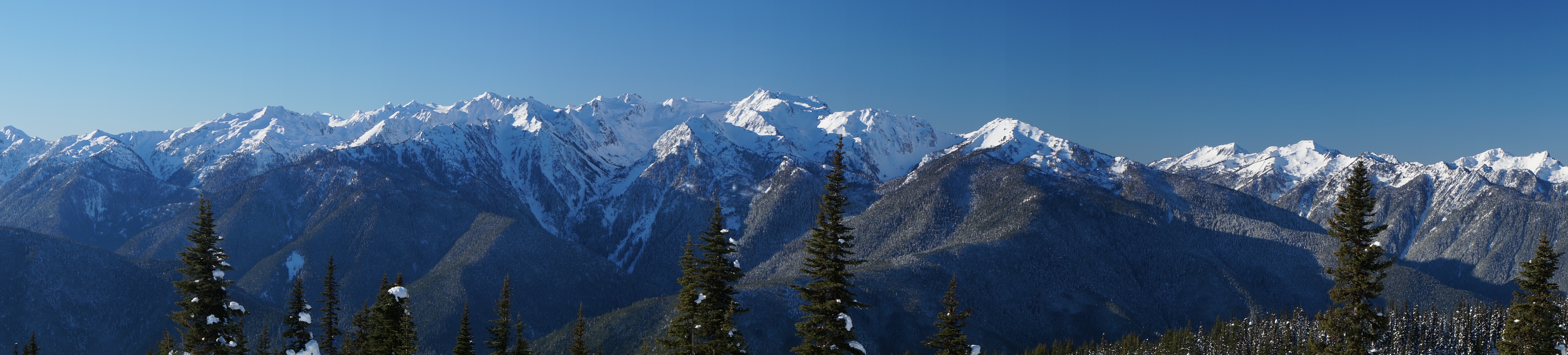
Bailey Range with Ruth Peak left of center
