= Stephen Peak =

Mountain in Washington (state), United States

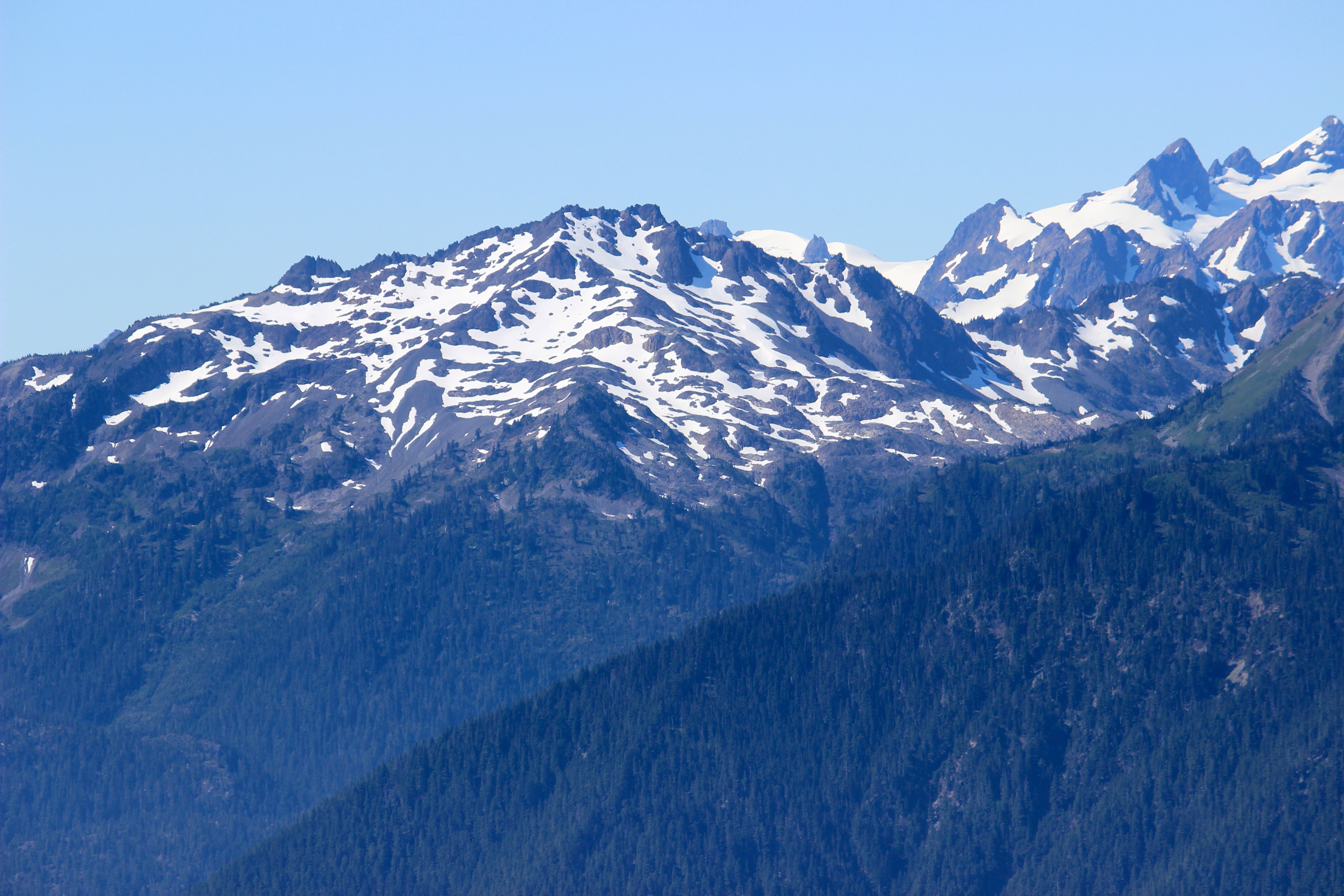
- Stephen Peak from Hurricane Ridge

Highest point
- Elevation: 6,418 ft (1,956 m)
- Prominence: 638 ft (194 m)
- Parent peak: Mount Carrie (6,995 ft)
- Isolation: 1.62 mi (2.61 km)
- Coordinates: 47°52′12″N 123°35′44″W

Geography
- Location within Washington (state) Location within the United States
- Location: Olympic National Park; Jefferson County, Washington, US
- Parent range: Olympic Mountains
- Topo map: USGS Mount Queets

Geology
- Rock age: Eocene

Climbing
- First ascent: 1961
- Easiest route: class 2 scrambling

Stephen Peak is a 6,418-foot (1,956-metre) mountain summit located within Olympic National Park in Jefferson County of Washington state. Stephen Peak is the fifth-highest peak in the Bailey Range, which is a subrange of the Olympic Mountains. In clear weather, the mountain can be seen from the visitor center at Hurricane Ridge, appearing to the left of Mount Olympus. Mount Ferry is set 2.26 mi (3.64 km) to the southeast, and Stephen's nearest higher neighbor is Ruth Peak which is an outlier of Mount Carrie, 2.1 mi (3.4 km) to the northwest. Precipitation runoff from the mountain drains into tributaries of the Elwha River and Hoh River. The first ascent of this peak was made in 1961 by Kent Heathershaw, Doug Waali, and Robert Wood.

== Climate ==
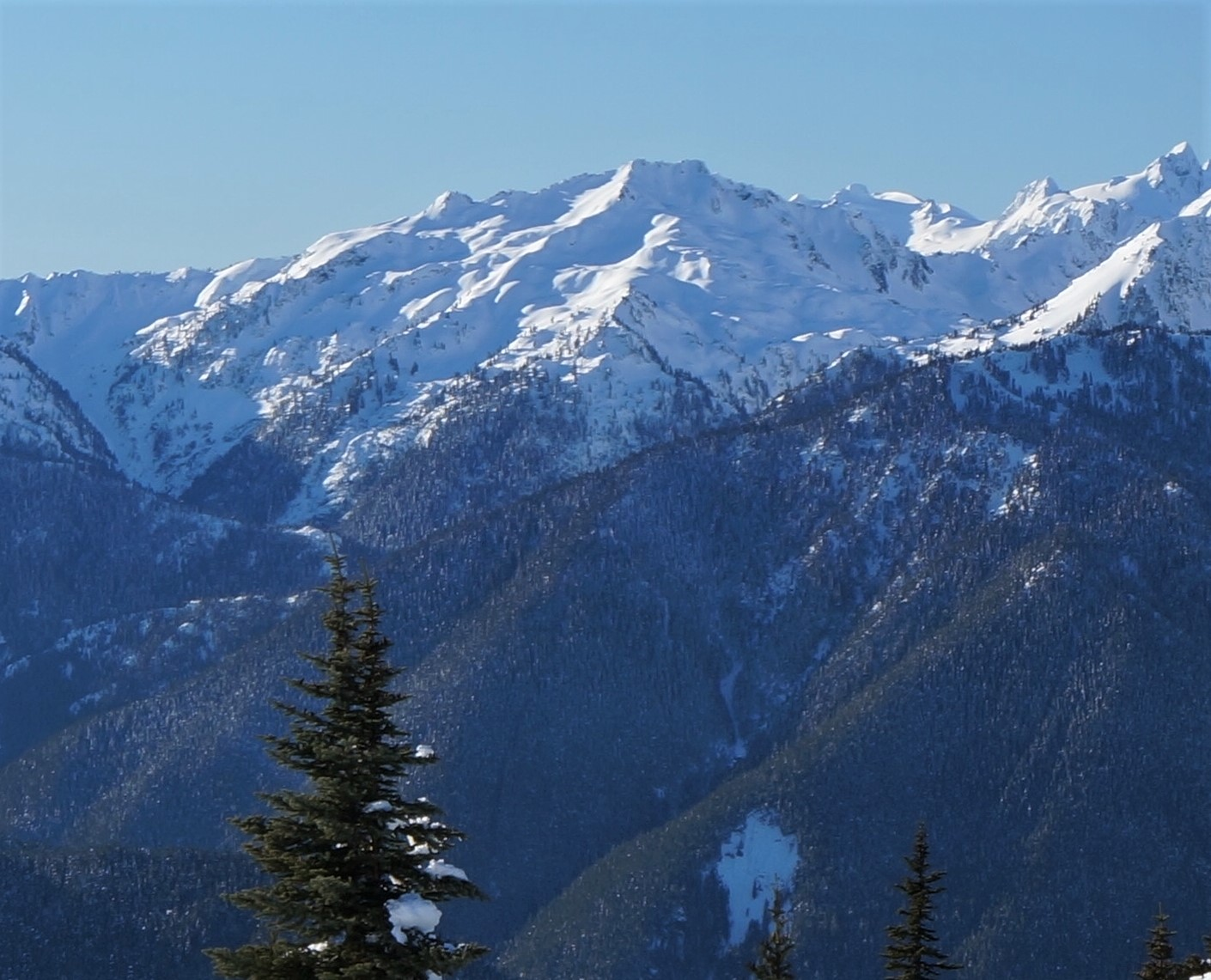
Stephen Peak in winter

Based on the Köppen climate classification, Stephen Peak is located in the marine west coast climate zone of western North America. Most weather fronts originate in the Pacific Ocean, and travel northeast toward the Olympic Mountains. As fronts approach, they are forced upward by the peaks of the Olympic Range, causing them to drop their moisture in the form of rain or snowfall (Orographic lift). As a result, the Olympics experience high precipitation, especially during the winter months. This climate supports an un-named glacier on its east side. During winter months, weather is usually cloudy, but, due to high pressure systems over the Pacific Ocean that intensify during summer months, there is often little or no cloud cover during the summer. In terms of favorable weather, the best months for viewing and climbing are July through September.

== Geology ==
The Olympic Mountains are composed of obducted clastic wedge material and oceanic crust, primarily Eocene sandstone, turbidite, and basaltic oceanic crust. The mountains were sculpted during the Pleistocene era by erosion and glaciers advancing and retreating multiple times.

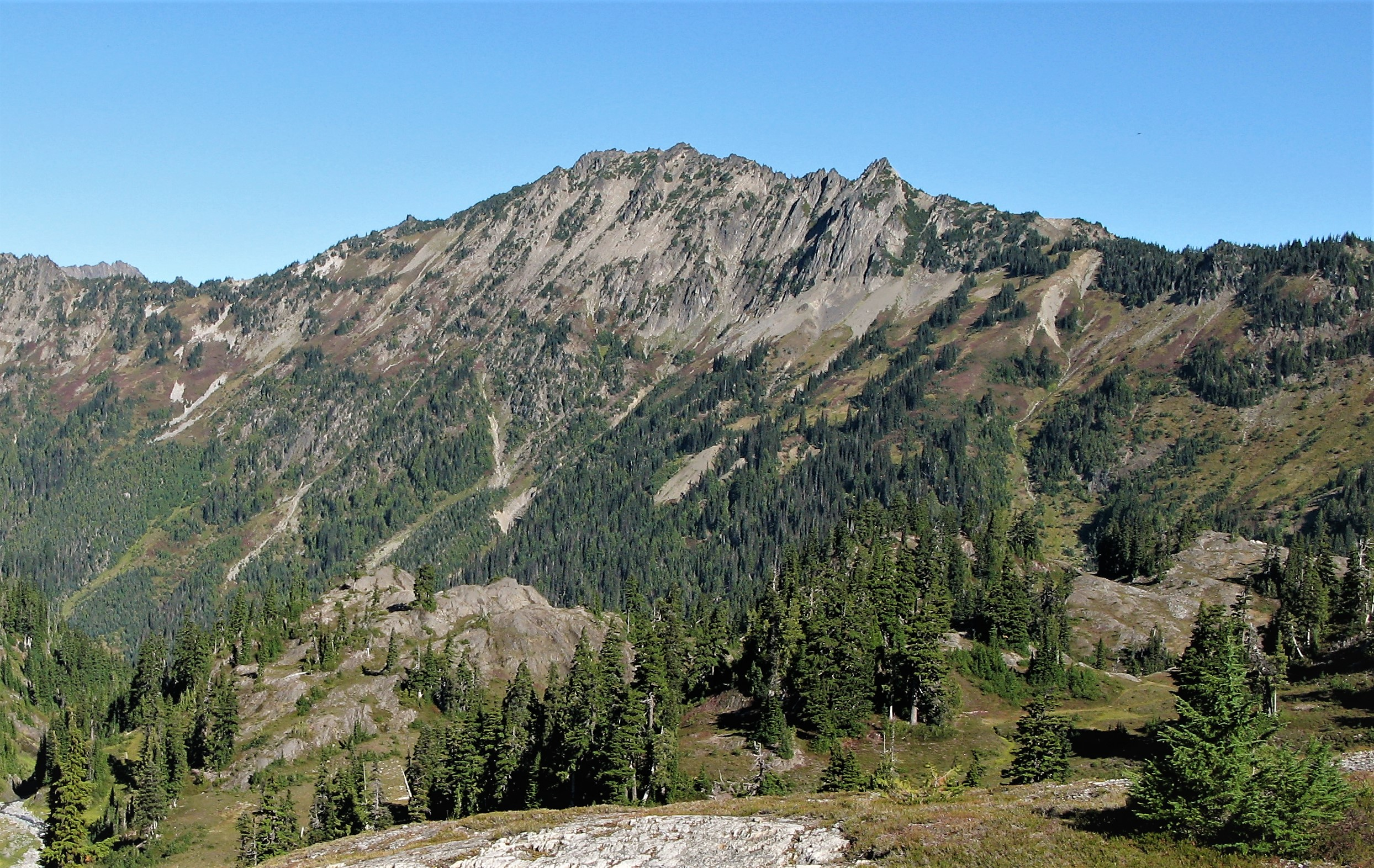
Stephen Peak's south aspect

== See also ==
- Olympic Mountains
- Geology of the Pacific Northwest
