= Carrie Glacier =

Glacier in Washington, United States

- Location within Washington (state)
- Type: Mountain glacier
- Location: Mount Carrie/Mount Fairchild, Olympic National Park, Clallam County, Washington, USA
- Coordinates: 47°53′29″N 123°38′05″W
- Length: .50 mi (0.80 km)
- Terminus: Proglacial lake
- Status: Retreating

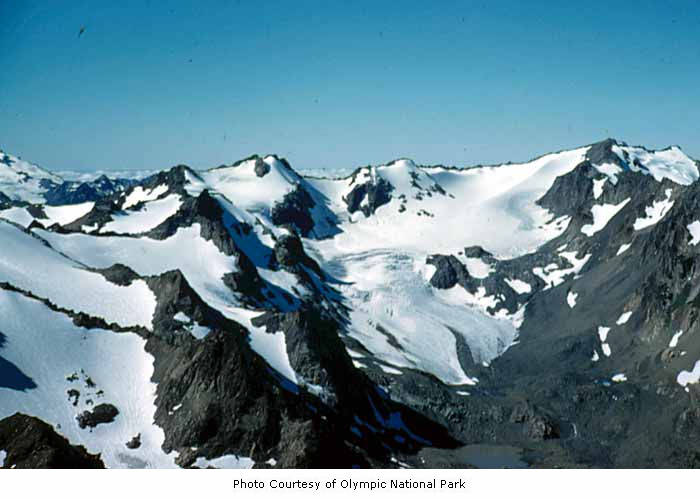
Fairchild Glacier on Mount Carrie, Olympic National Park

Carrie Glacier is located on Mount Carrie and Mount Fairchild in the Olympic Mountains of Olympic National Park. Starting at an elevation of about 6,800 feet (2,100 m), the glacier descends northward, but the ice soon reaches a cliff. Part of the Carrie Glacier plunges over the steep rockwall, contributing ice to an adjacent glacier, while the other section flows north-northeast, avoiding the precipitous drop. This segment of ice is confined by an arête to the west and Mount Fairchild to the east in a chute. The glacier reaches as low as 5,000 ft (1,500 m) before terminating. There are several other patches of snow and glaciers located nearby, such as the Fairchild Glacier.

Mount Carrie and Carrie Glacier were named by surveyor Theodore Rixon for his fiancée Caroline Jones whom he met on a trail in Soleduck Valley.

== See also ==
- List of glaciers in the United States
