= Mount Carrie =

Mountain in Washington (state), United States

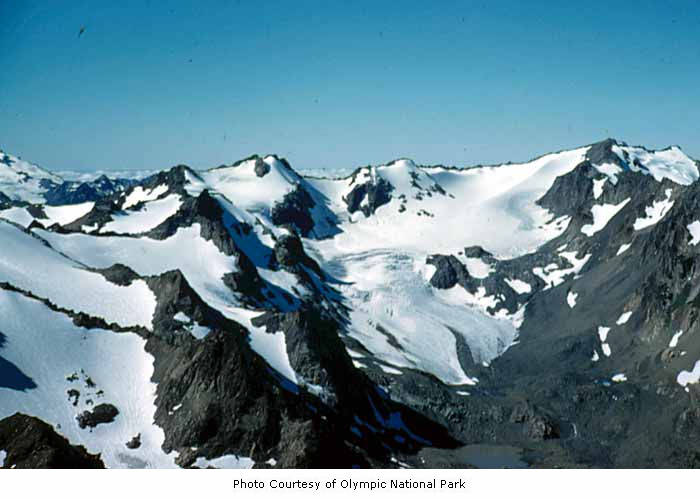
- Mt. Carrie (right), Ruth Peak (left) and Fairchild Glacier

Highest point
- Elevation: 6,995 ft (2,132 m)
- Prominence: 1,675 ft (511 m)
- Isolation: 6.24 mi (10.04 km)
- Coordinates: 47°53′39″N 123°38′57″W

Geography
- Location within Washington (state) Location within the United States
- Location: Olympic National Park; Clallam County, Washington, US
- Parent range: Olympic Mountains; Bailey Range
- Topo map: USGS Mount Carrie

Geology
- Rock age: Eocene
- Rock type: grey sandstone

Climbing
- Easiest route: Scrambling YDS 2 via the High Divide Trail and Cat Walk

Mount Carrie is a 6,995-foot (2,132-metre) mountain summit located within Olympic National Park in Clallam County of Washington state. Mt. Carrie is the highest point in the Bailey Range which is a subrange of the Olympic Mountains. With a good eye and clear weather, the mountain can be seen from the visitor center at Hurricane Ridge. Its nearest higher peak is Mount Mathias (7,156 ft) which is an outlier of Mount Olympus, 6.24 mi (10.04 km) to the south. Due to heavy winter snowfalls, Mount Carrie supports the Carrie Glacier in its northeast cirque, and Fairchild Glacier on the east slope. Precipitation runoff from the mountain drains into tributaries of the Elwha River and Hoh River. There is a scrambling route via the High Divide Trail and Cat Walk.

== History ==
The Olympic Peninsula was largely unmapped until surveyors Arthur Dodwell and Theodore Rixon mapped most of its topography between 1898 and 1900, and what is now Mt. Carrie, was in 1899 one of the last remaining unnamed mountains in the Olympic range. The mountain was named by Theodore Rixon for his wife Caroline "Carrie" (Jones) Rixon. Carrie Rixon was a noted artist, painter, singer, and taught music to children. The Rixons lived at a 160-acre homestead she called Fairholme at the west end of Lake Crescent, until they moved to Teahwhit Head in 1916. Carrie died on May 20, 1946.

== Climate ==
Based on the Köppen climate classification, Mount Carrie is located in the marine west coast climate zone of western North America. Most weather fronts originate in the Pacific Ocean, and travel northeast toward the Olympic Mountains. As fronts approach, they are forced upward by the peaks of the Olympic Range, causing them to drop their moisture in the form of rain or snowfall (Orographic lift). As a result, the Olympics experience high precipitation, especially during the winter months. During winter months, weather is usually cloudy, but, due to high pressure systems over the Pacific Ocean that intensify during summer months, there is often little or no cloud cover during the summer. In terms of favorable weather, the best months for viewing and climbing are July through September.

== Gallery ==
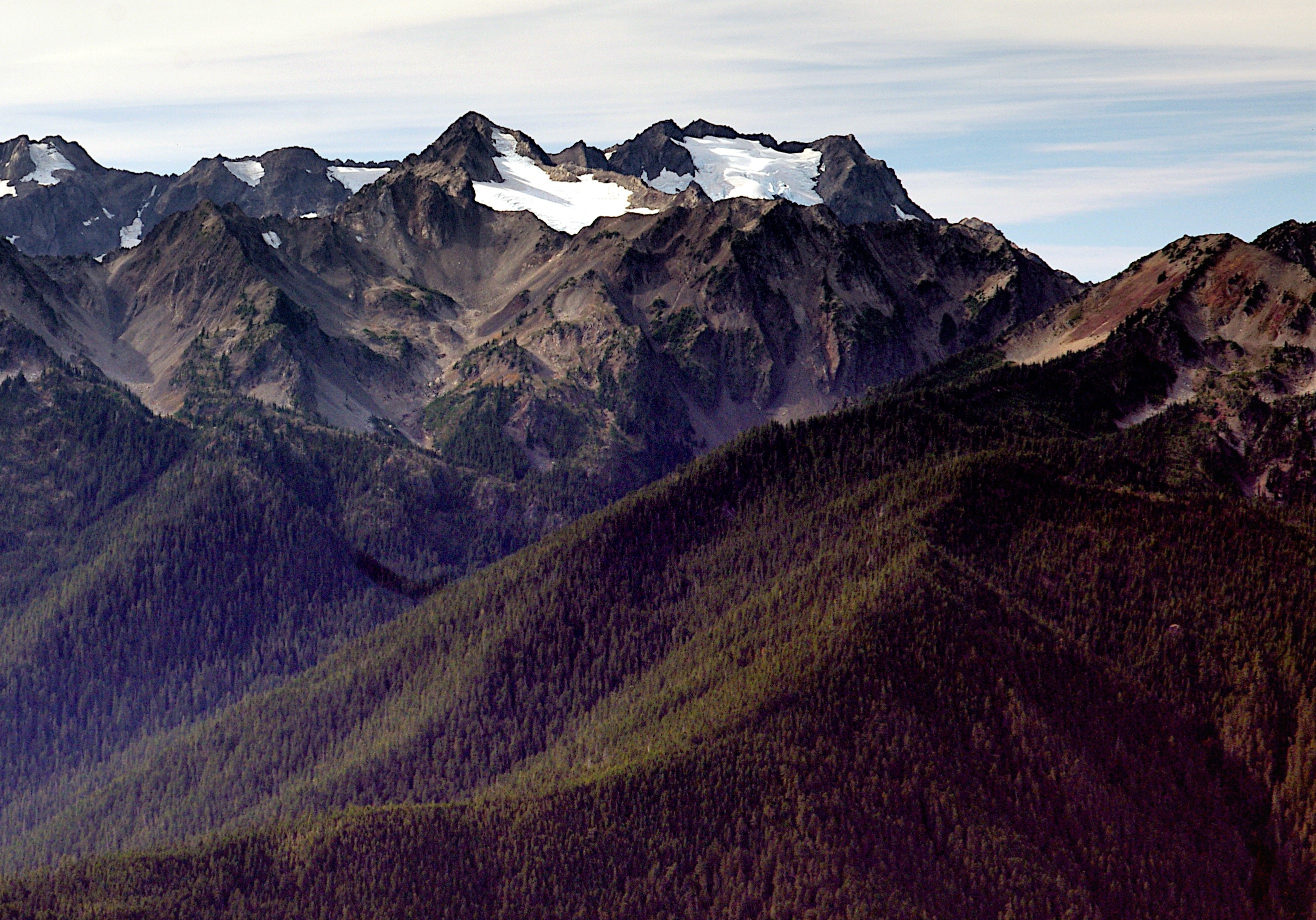
Mount Fairchild and Mt. Carrie seen from Hurricane Hill

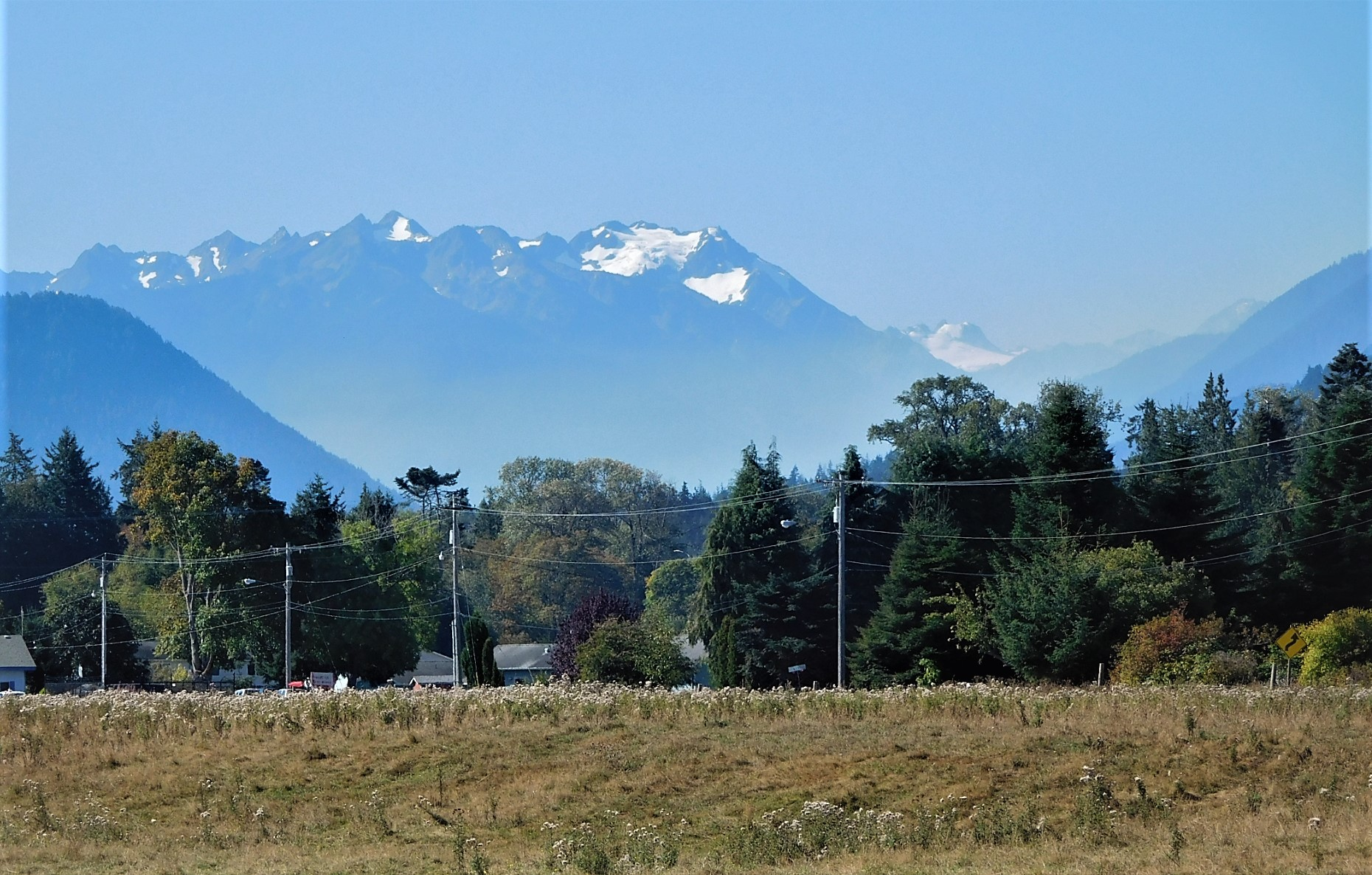
Mount Carrie from north

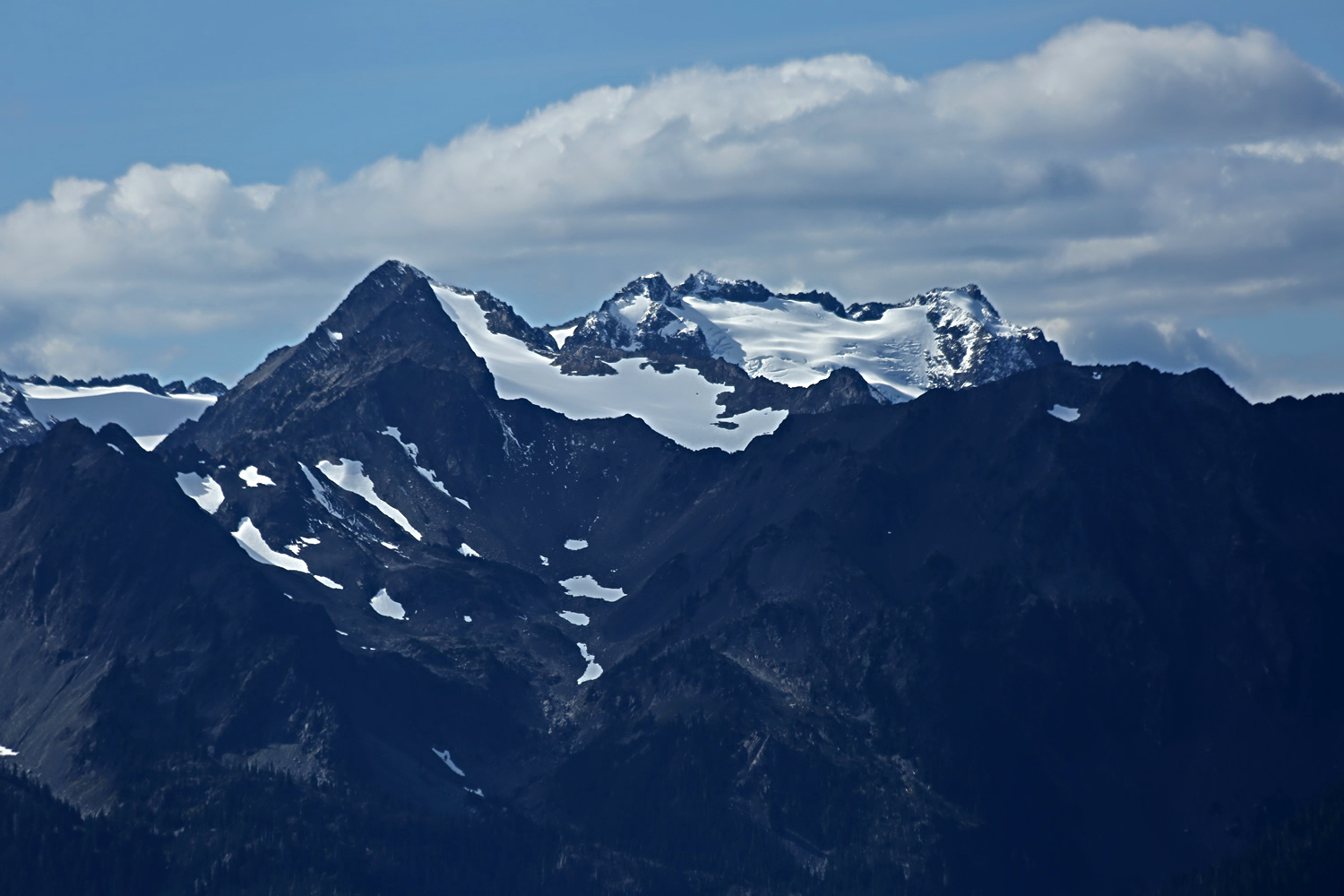
Mount Fairchild (left) and Mt. Carrie seen from Hurricane Hill

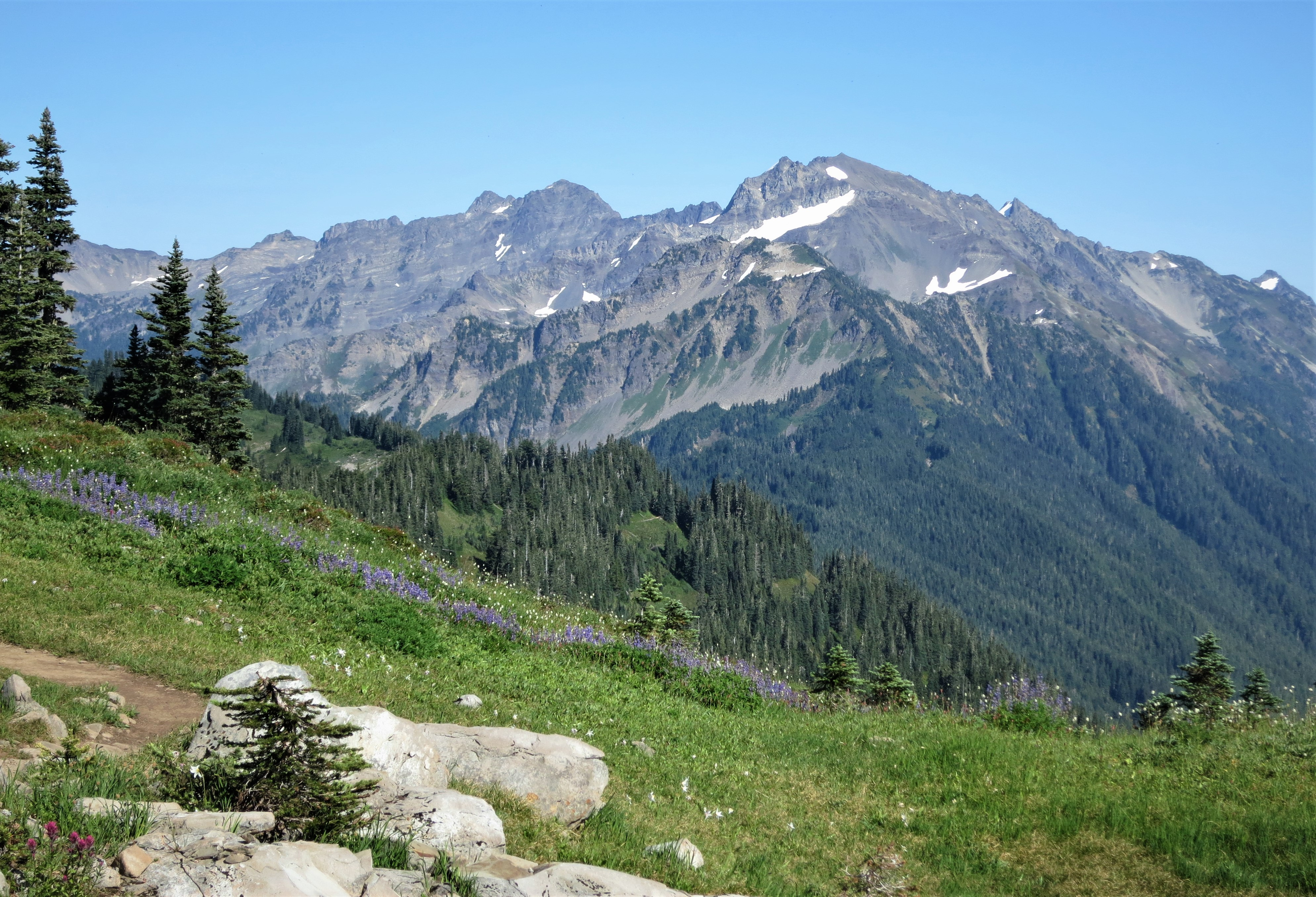
Cat Peak, Mt. Fairchild, and Mt. Carrie seen from the west along High Divide

== See also ==
- Olympic Mountains
- Geology of the Pacific Northwest
