= Fairchild Glacier =

Glacier in Washington, United States

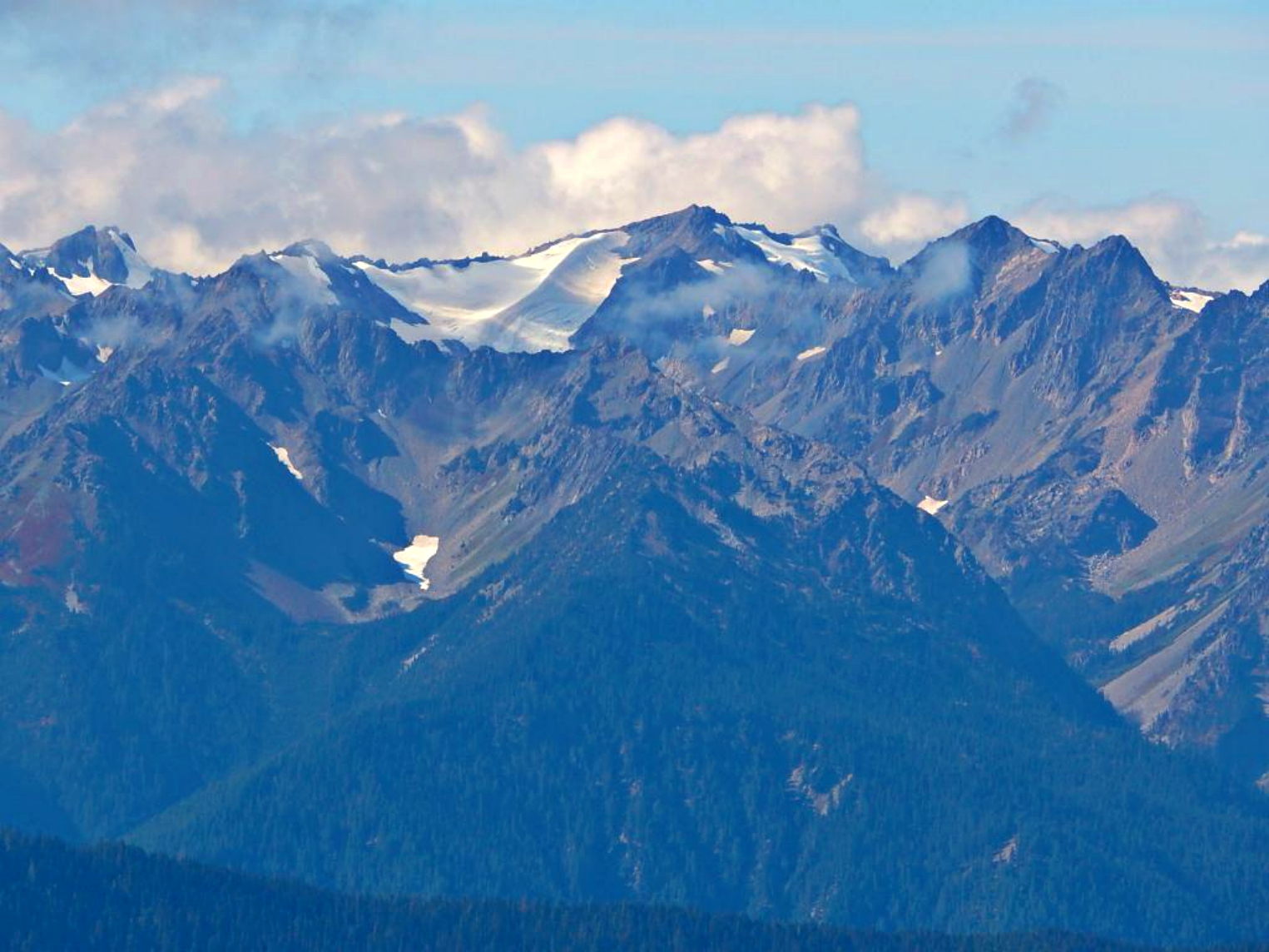
- Fairchild Glacier on Mount Carrie

- Location within Washington (state)
- Type: Mountain glacier
- Location: Mount Carrie-Mount Fairchild, Olympic National Park, Clallam County, Washington, USA
- Coordinates: 47°54′24″N 123°37′44″W
- Length: .40 mi (0.64 km)
- Terminus: Proglacial lake
- Status: Retreating

Fairchild Glacier is located in the U.S. state of Washington on Mount Fairchild and Mount Carrie in the Olympic Mountains of Olympic National Park. Beginning at an elevation of about 6,600 feet (2,000 m) along the Bailey Ridge, the glacier descends northeast and is .30 mi (0.48 km) northeast of Carrie Glacier. Like all the glaciers in Olympic National Park, Fairchild Glacier has been in a general retreat for over 100 years. The glacier is named for William R. Fairchild, who was a pilot that assisted scientific researchers in the region.

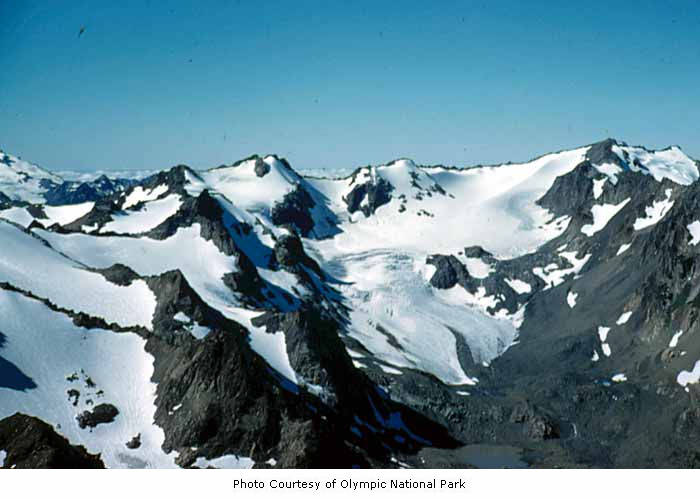
Fairchild Glacier

== See also ==
- List of glaciers in the United States
