= Mount Fairchild =

Mountain in Washington (state), United States

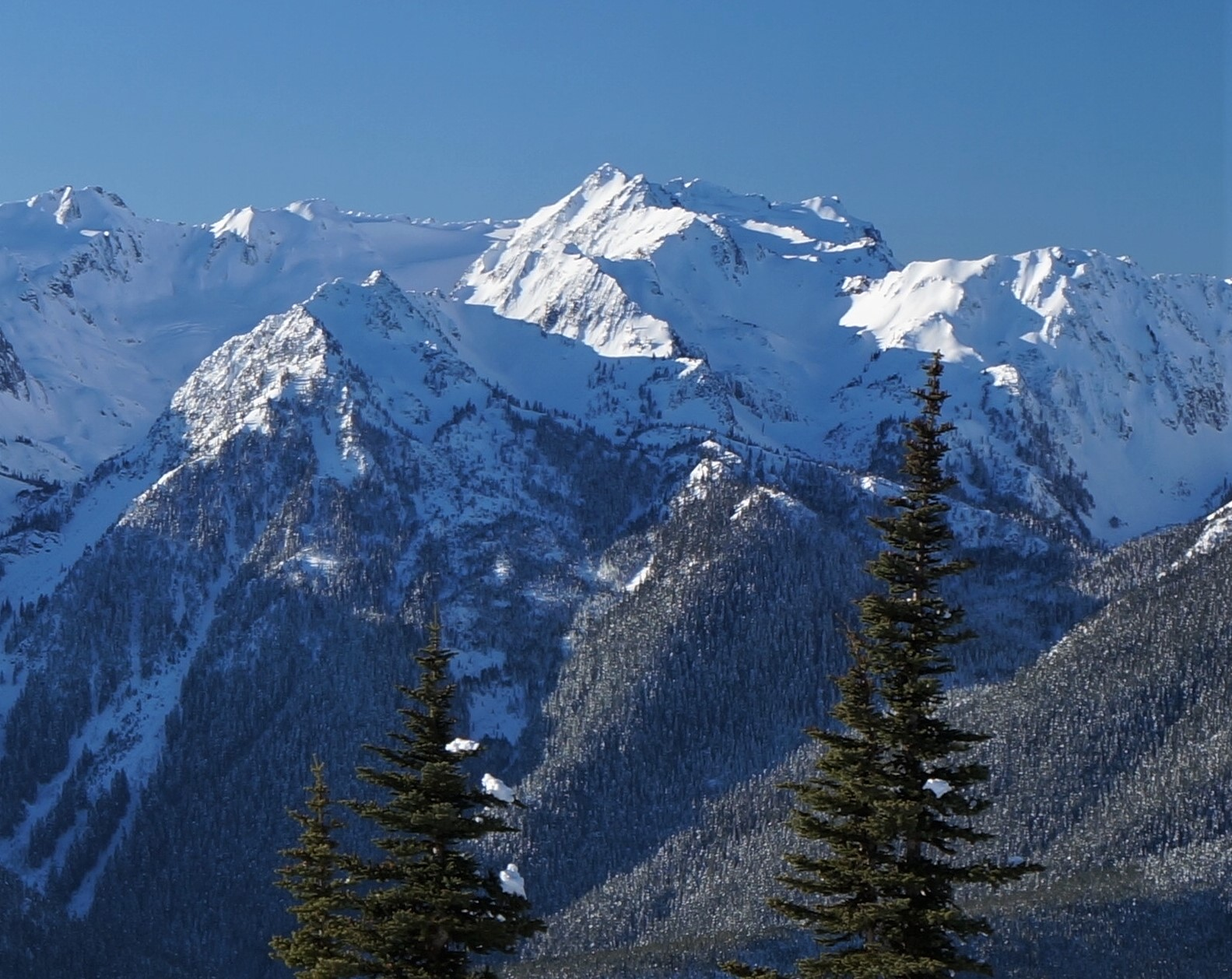
- Mount Fairchild from Hurricane Ridge

Highest point
- Elevation: 6,900 ft (2,100 m)
- Prominence: 450 ft (140 m)
- Parent peak: Mount Carrie (6,995 ft)
- Isolation: 0.85 mi (1.37 km)
- Coordinates: 47°54′01″N 123°38′00″W

Geography
- Location within Washington (state) Location within the United States
- Location: Olympic National Park; Clallam County, Washington, US
- Parent range: Olympic Mountains
- Topo map: USGS Mount Carrie

Geology
- Rock age: Eocene

Climbing
- First ascent: 1963
- Easiest route: class 3 scrambling

Mount Fairchild, also known as Mount William Fairchild, is a 6,900-foot (2,100-metre) glaciated mountain summit located within Olympic National Park in Clallam County of Washington state. Mt. Fairchild is the second-highest peak in the Bailey Range, which is a subrange of the Olympic Mountains. Its nearest higher neighbor is Mount Carrie, 0.84 mi (1.35 km) to the southwest, and Ruth Peak is set 0.92 mi (1.48 km) to the south. In clear weather, the mountain can be seen from the visitor center at Hurricane Ridge. Precipitation runoff from the mountain drains into tributaries of the Elwha River.

== History ==
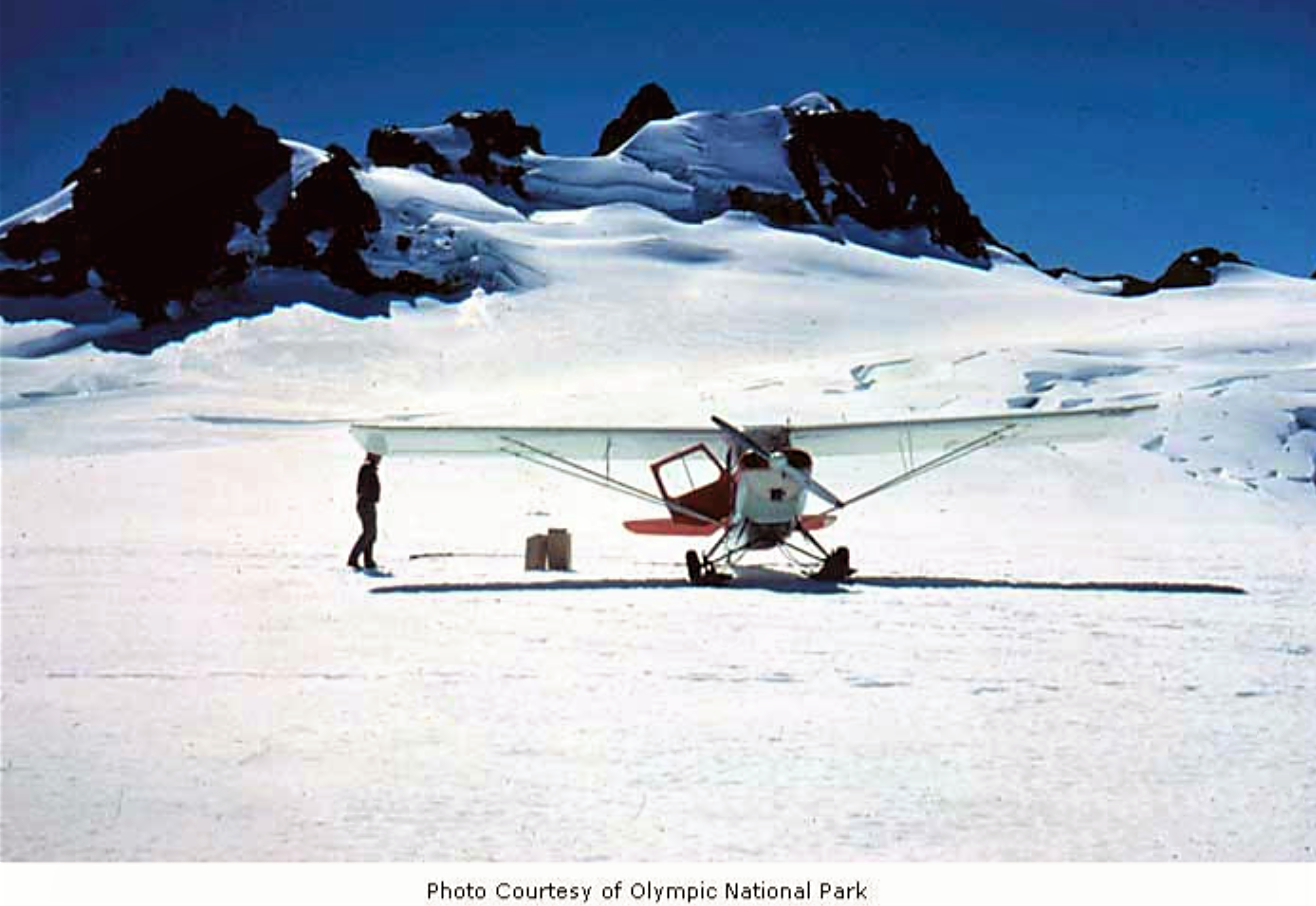
Fairchild's airplane on Mt. Olympus

Mount Fairchild is situated at the head of Fairchild Creek, which originates from the Fairchild Glacier, and each are named for pilot William R. Fairchild (1926–1969), who flew hundreds of photographic flights to support scientific studies of glaciers in the Olympic Mountains for the U. S. Geological Survey and U.S. National Park Service, as well as thousands of other glaciers in Western North America. Fairchild's method of taking off from the nearby Blue Glacier became known as the "Fairchild sleigh ride", and was seen in a climactic scene in a two-part show in the Lassie TV series. Fairchild was one of ten who died when the air taxi service he created crashed on February 5, 1969, immediately after take-off from Port Angeles, en route to Seattle. This mountain's toponym was officially adopted in 1975 by the U.S. Board on Geographic Names. The William R. Fairchild International Airport in nearby Port Angeles is also named after him.

The first ascent of this peak was made in 1963 by Denny Pruitt, Dan Baker, Jack Christiansen, and Roy Etten.

== Climate ==
Based on the Köppen climate classification, Mount Fairchild is located in the marine west coast climate zone of western North America. This climate supports the Fairchild and Carrie Glaciers on its slopes. Most weather fronts originate in the Pacific Ocean, and travel northeast toward the Olympic Mountains. As fronts approach, they are forced upward by the peaks of the Olympic Range, causing them to drop their moisture in the form of rain or snowfall (Orographic lift). As a result, the Olympics experience high precipitation, especially during the winter months. During winter months, weather is usually cloudy, but, due to high pressure systems over the Pacific Ocean that intensify during summer months, there is often little or no cloud cover during the summer. In terms of favorable weather, the best months for viewing and climbing are July through September.

== Geology ==
The Olympic Mountains are composed of obducted clastic wedge material and oceanic crust, primarily Eocene sandstone, turbidite, and basaltic oceanic crust. The mountains were sculpted during the Pleistocene era by erosion and glaciers advancing and retreating multiple times.

== See also ==
- Olympic Mountains
- Geology of the Pacific Northwest

== Gallery ==
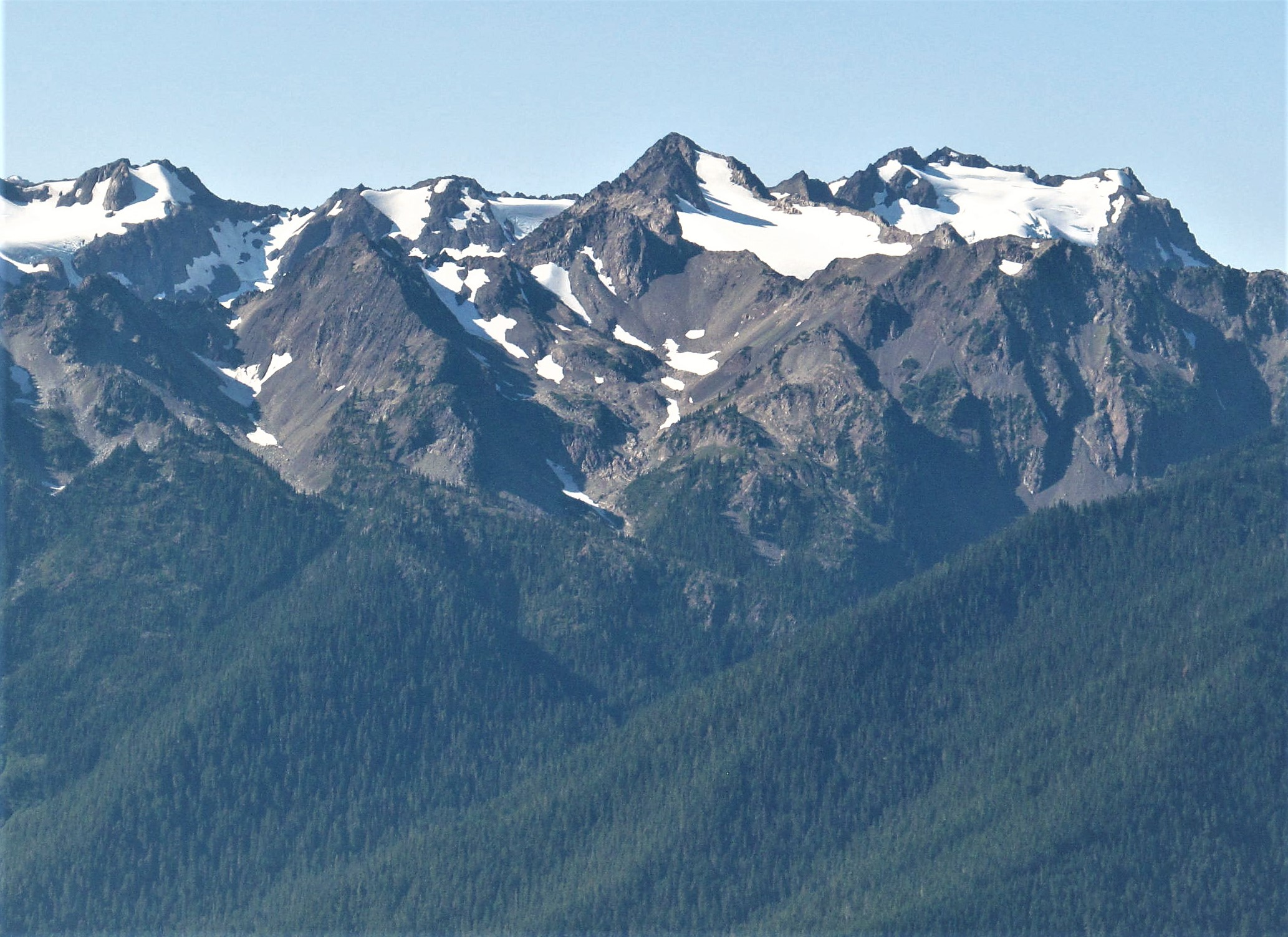
Ruth (left), Fairchild center, Carrie (right)

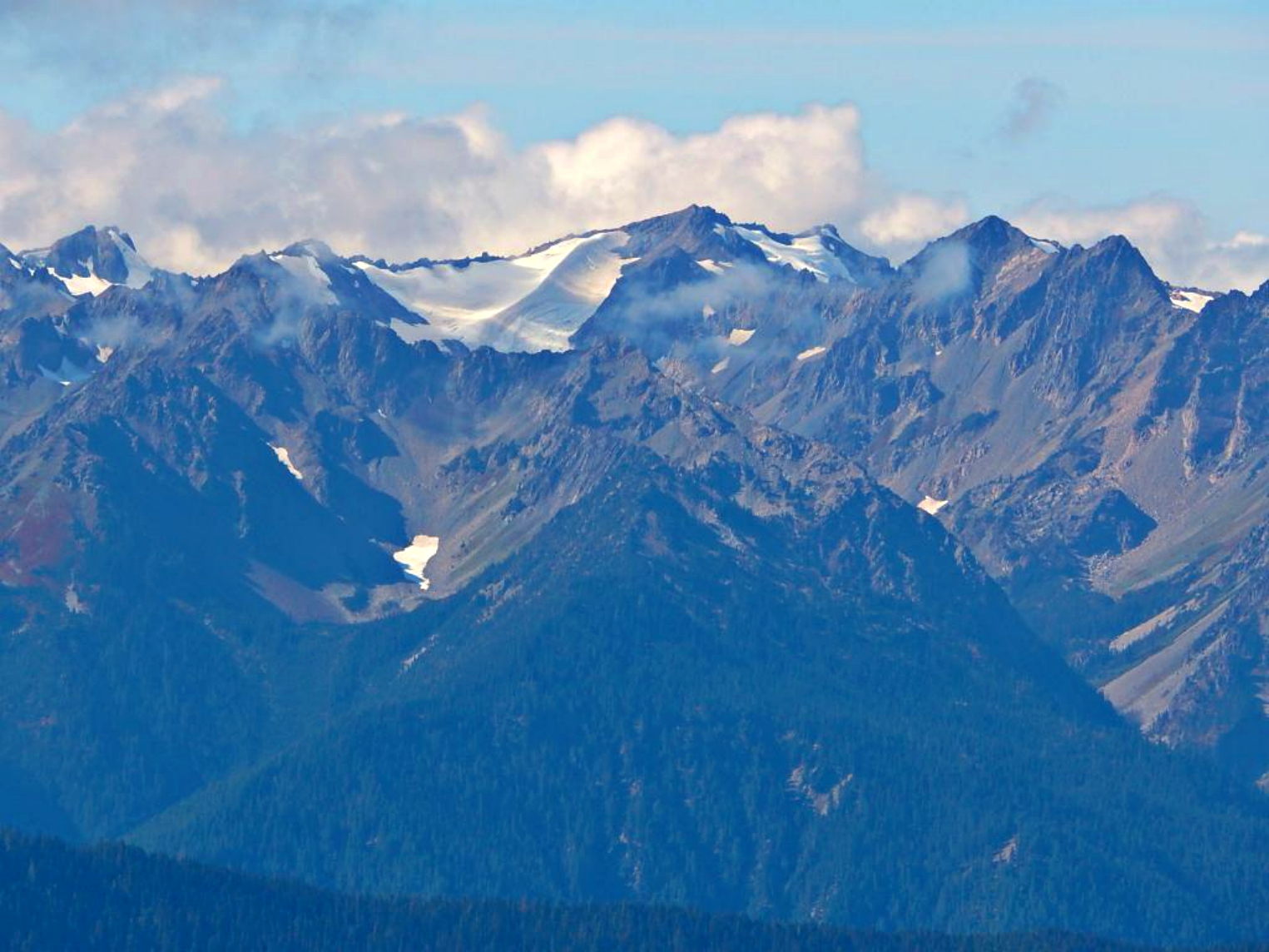
Mt. Carrie (center), Mt. Fairchild (right)

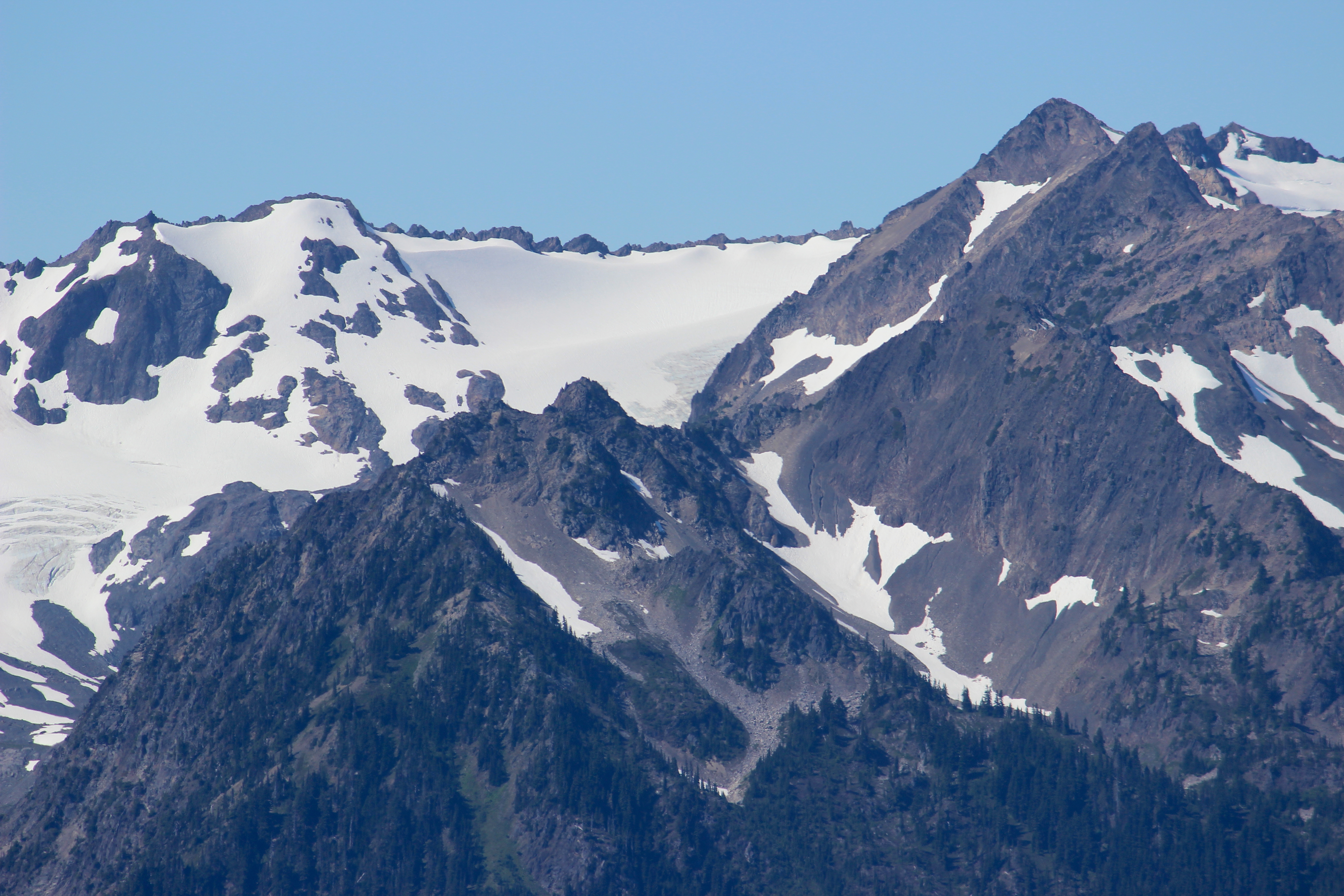
Mt. Fairchild (right) with Fairchild Glacier

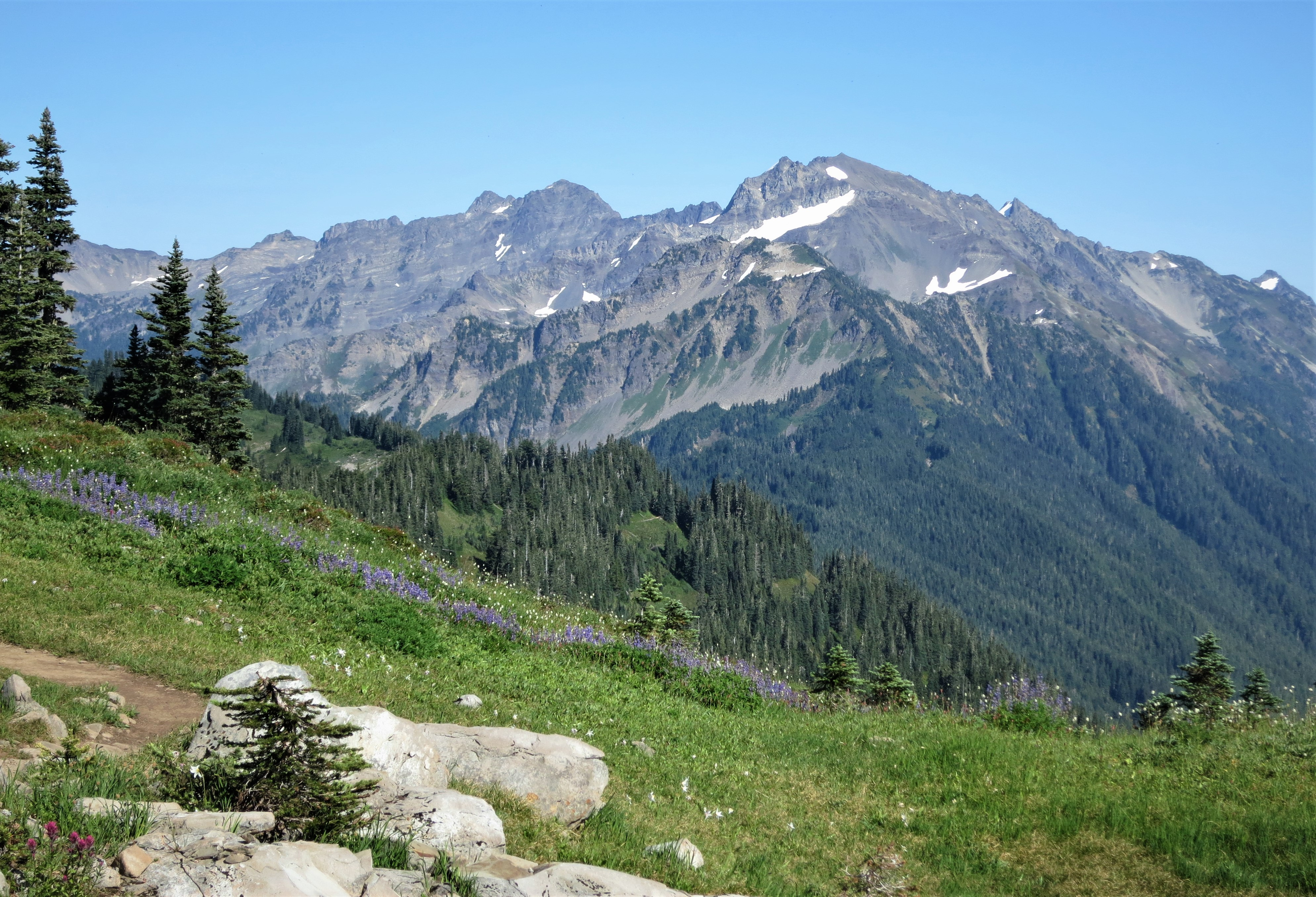
Fairchild (left), Carrie (right) from the west

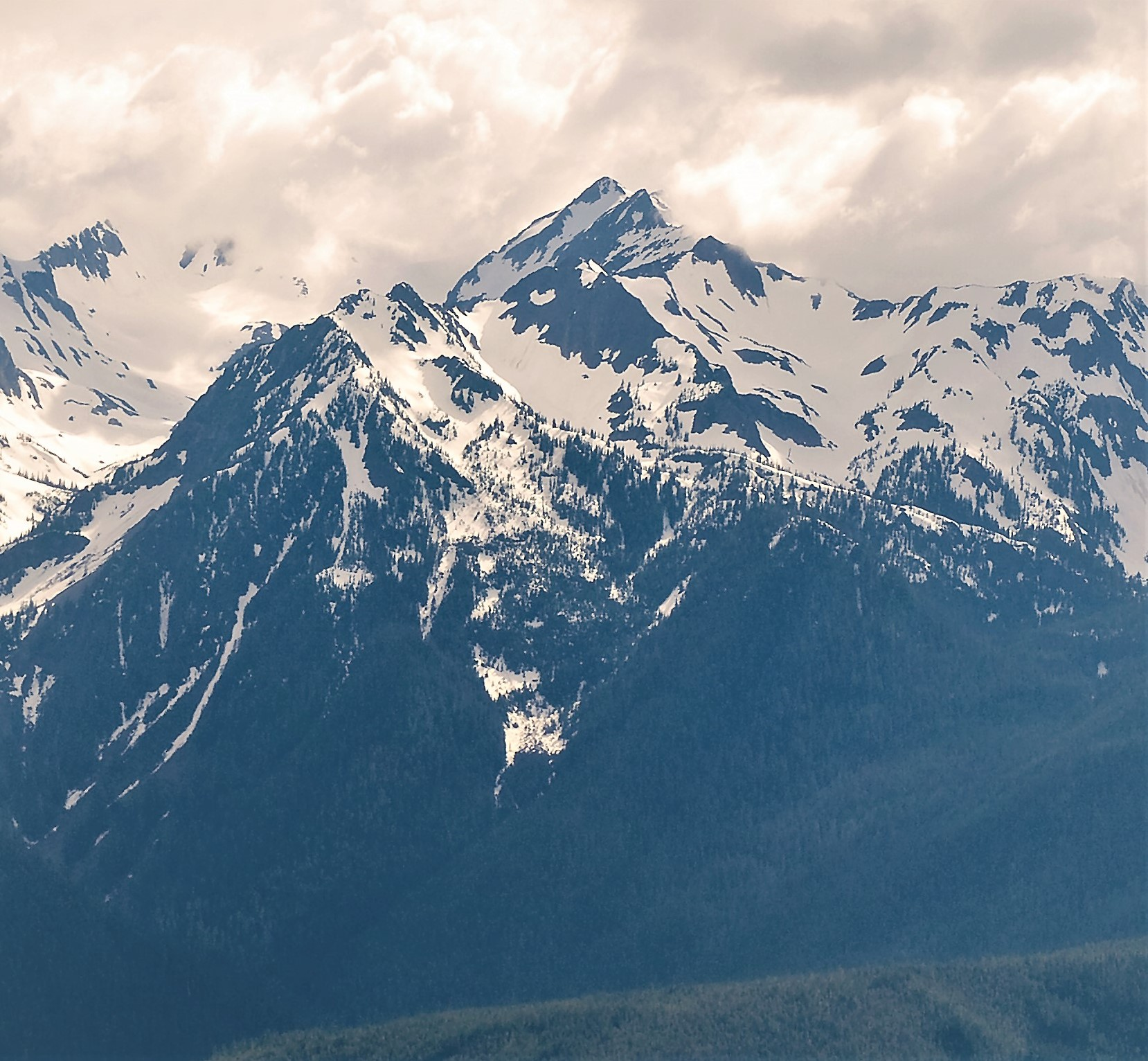

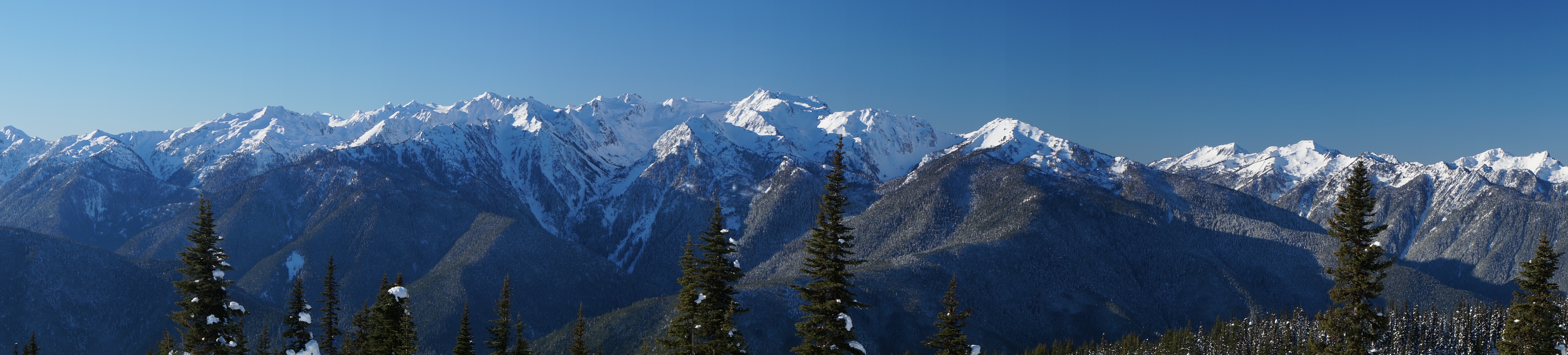
Bailey Range from Hurricane Ridge, Mt. Fairchild centered, Mount Fitzhenry to its right
