= Hurricane Hill =

Mountain in Washington (state), United States

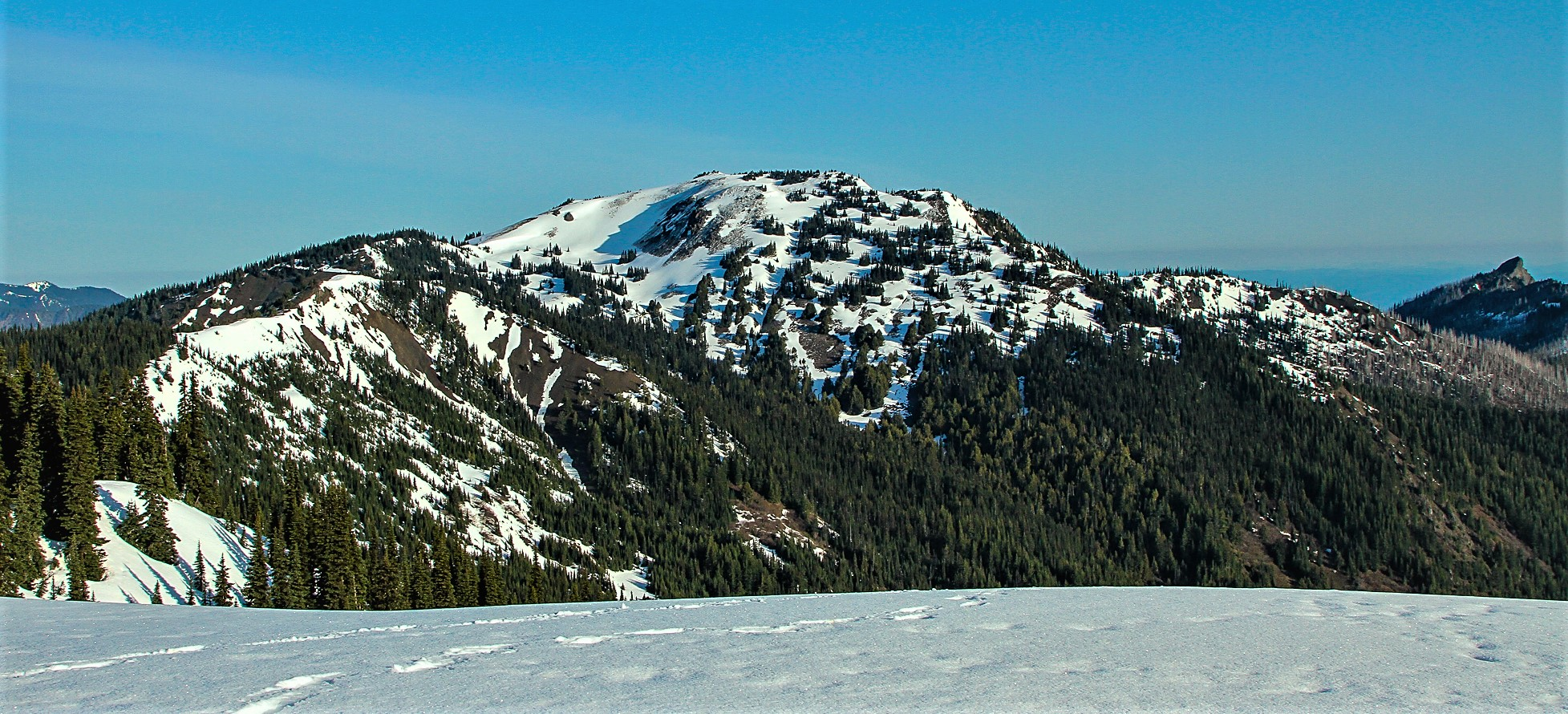
- Southeast aspect in spring

Highest point
- Elevation: 5,757 ft (1,755 m)
- Prominence: 707 ft (215 m)
- Parent peak: Mount Angeles (6,454 ft)
- Isolation: 2.89 mi (4.65 km)
- Coordinates: 47°59′24″N 123°31′45″W

Geography
- Location within Washington (state) Location within the United States
- Country: United States
- State: Washington
- County: Clallam
- Protected area: Olympic National Park
- Parent range: Olympic Mountains
- Topo map: USGS Hurricane Hill

Geology
- Rock age: Eocene

Climbing
- Easiest route: class 1 hiking on a paved trail

Hurricane Hill is a 5,757-foot (1,755 m) mountain summit located within Olympic National Park in Clallam County of Washington state. It is part of the Olympic Mountains and is situated at the western end of Hurricane Ridge within the Daniel J. Evans Wilderness. Hurricane Hill is nine miles south-southwest of Port Angeles and two miles northwest of the park's Hurricane Ridge Visitor Center. Precipitation runoff from the mountain drains to the Elwha River via various tributaries. Topographic relief is significant as the southwest aspect rises 5,100 feet (1,600 m) above the Elwha Valley in three miles.

== History ==
This landform was originally christened "Mt. Eldridge" by the 1889-90 Seattle Press Expedition, for William C. Eldridge, a journalist from Washington D.C. Early pioneers of the area referred to the mountain as "Old Hurricane" because of hurricane-force winds in winter, and in 1897 it was named Hurricane Hill by prospector W. A. Hall who climbed it from the Elwha Valley on a particularly windy day. During World War II, a 13' by 13' observation cabin was constructed at the top for the Aircraft Warning Service and was used by wildlife cinematographer Herb Crisler and his wife from 1942 to 1943. The lookout has since been removed, while Dodger Point and Pyramid Peak Lookouts are the only stations remaining in Olympic National Park of the thirteen that were constructed.

== Climate ==
Based on the Köppen climate classification, Hurricane Hill is located in the marine west coast climate zone of western North America. Weather fronts originating in the Pacific Ocean travel northeast toward the Olympic Mountains. As fronts approach, they are forced upward by the peaks (orographic lift), causing them to drop their moisture in the form of rain or snow. As a result, the Olympics experience high precipitation, especially during the winter months in the form of snowfall. Because of maritime influence, snow tends to be wet and heavy, resulting in high avalanche danger. During winter months weather is usually cloudy, but due to high pressure systems over the Pacific Ocean that intensify during summer months, there is often little or no cloud cover during the summer.

== Recreation ==
From the end of the Hurricane Ridge Road, a 1.6-mile trail leads to the top of Hurricane Hill. This paved trail was originally a Forest Service road built in the 1930s by the Civilian Conservation Corps. The relatively easy and popular hike gains approximately 750 feet of elevation and is snow-free from late June to October. The trail was refurbished in 2020. In winter, Hurricane Hill becomes a favorite destination with snowshoers. There is also a six-mile trail on the west side which climbs up from the Elwha Valley and gains 5,100 feet of elevation. From the north side, the Little River Trail climbs 4,700 feet over seven miles before intersecting with the paved Hurricane Hill trail. The summit offers views of the Bailey Range, Mount Olympus, Victoria on Vancouver Island across the Strait of Juan de Fuca, and on clear days one can see Mount Baker 95 miles distant. Hurricane Hill is considered one of the best wildflower hikes in Washington state with over 125 species of plants, with the peak time for wildflowers in July and August.

== Flora and fauna ==
Hurricane Hill hosts lupine, mountain pasqueflower, mountain dandelion, rosy pussytoes, nodding arnica, Olympic Mountain aster, western mugwort, common harebell, paintprush, mountain larkspur and rockslide larkspur. Old-growth forests of Douglas fir, western hemlock, and western redcedar grow on the lower slopes surrounding the peak. Deer, grouse, chipmunks, and marmots may be encountered on the meadow slopes. Colonies of the Olympic marmot are found only in the Olympic Mountains and nowhere else in the world, but their population has declined due to non-native coyote predation. However, they continue to thrive on Hurricane Hill which makes it the best place to see and photograph them.

== Gallery ==
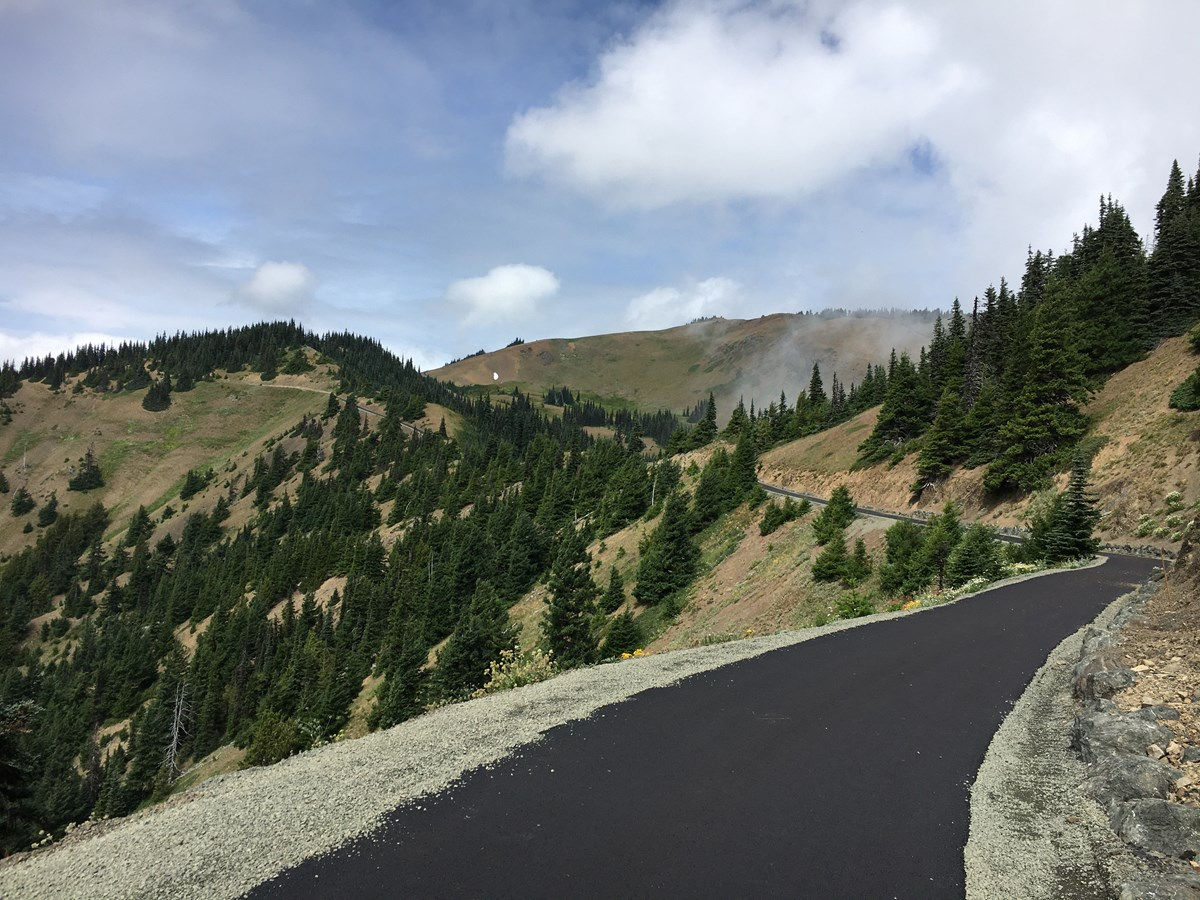
Newly refurbished trail to Hurricane Hill in 2020

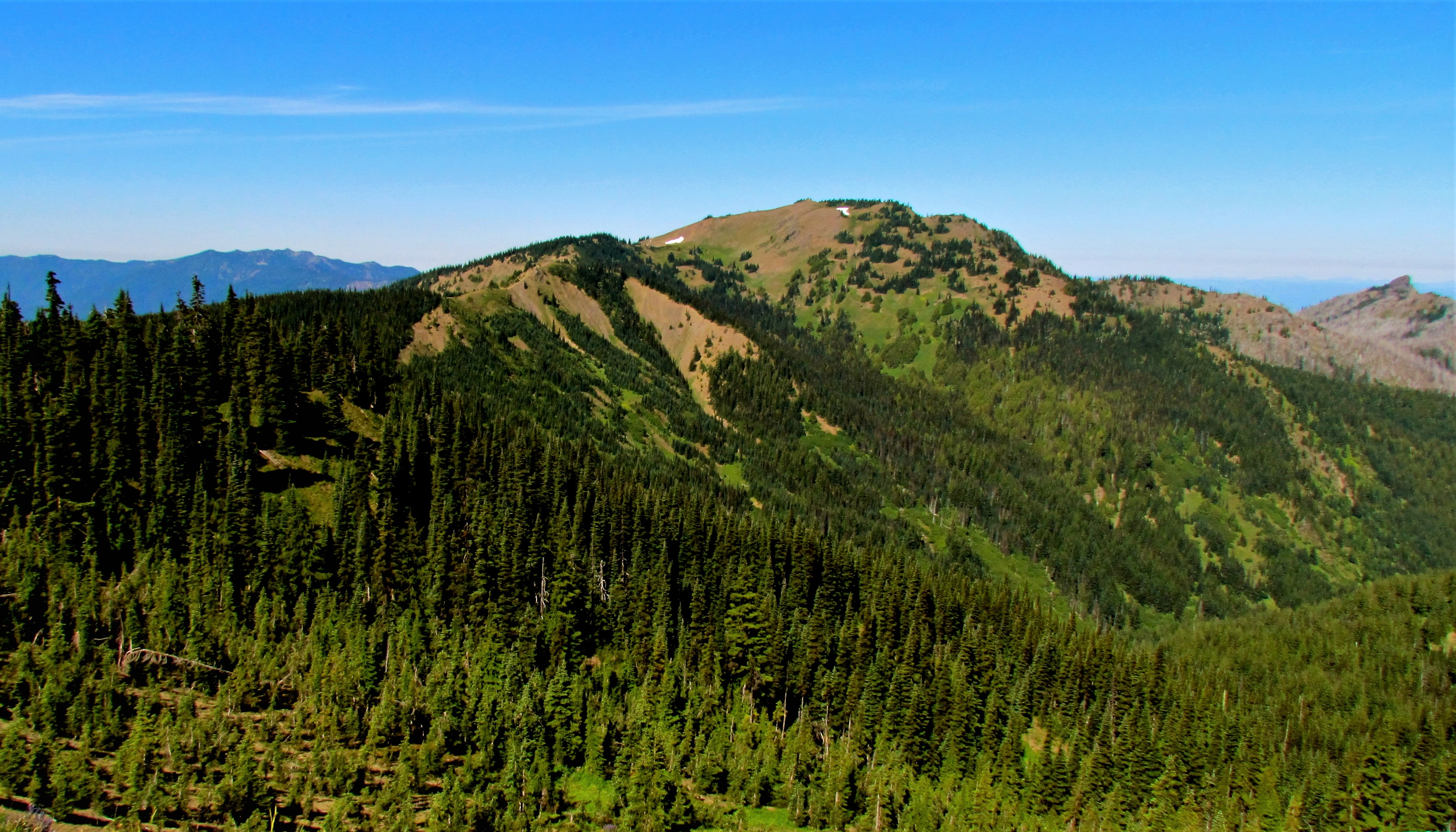
Hurricane Hill from southeast

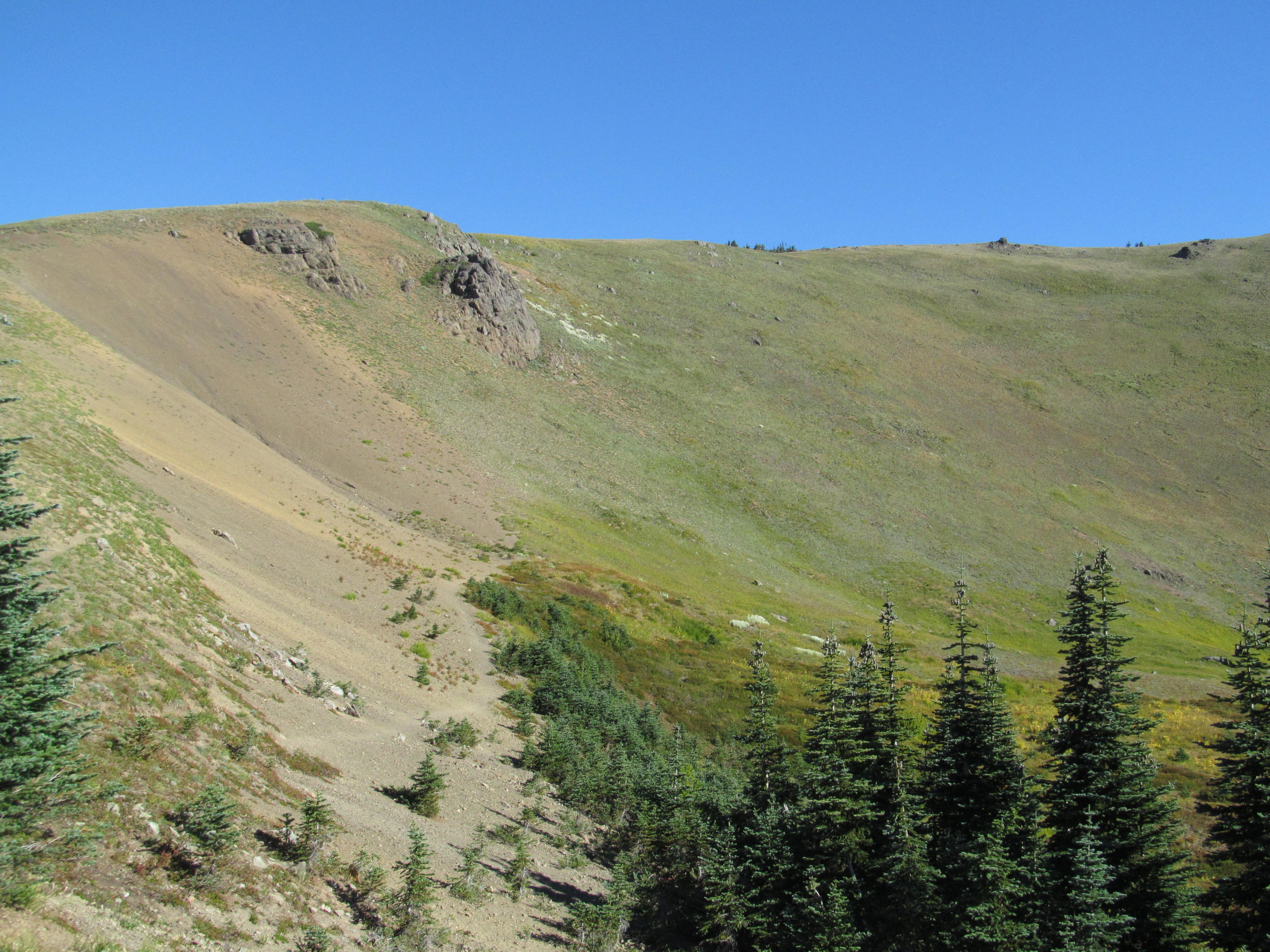
South aspect of Hurricane Hill seen from 5,250'

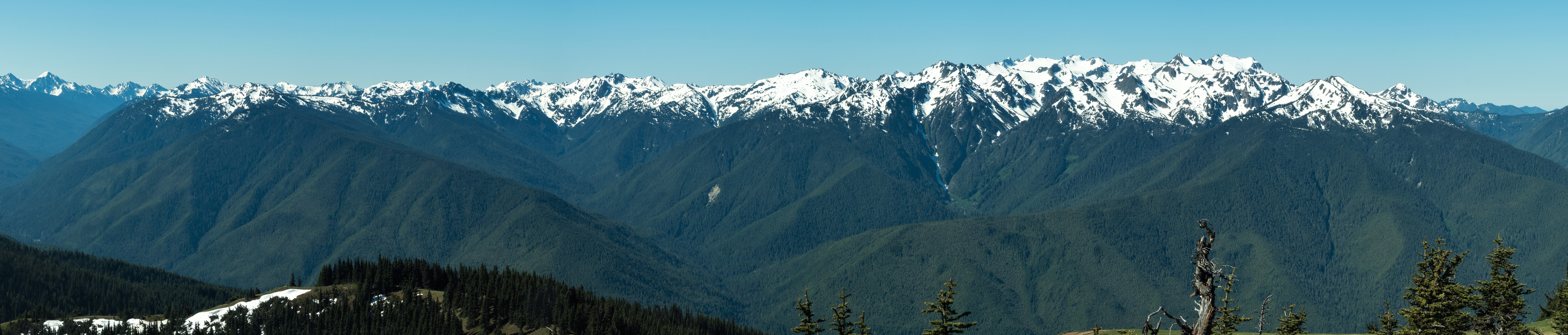
The Bailey Range seen from Hurricane Hill

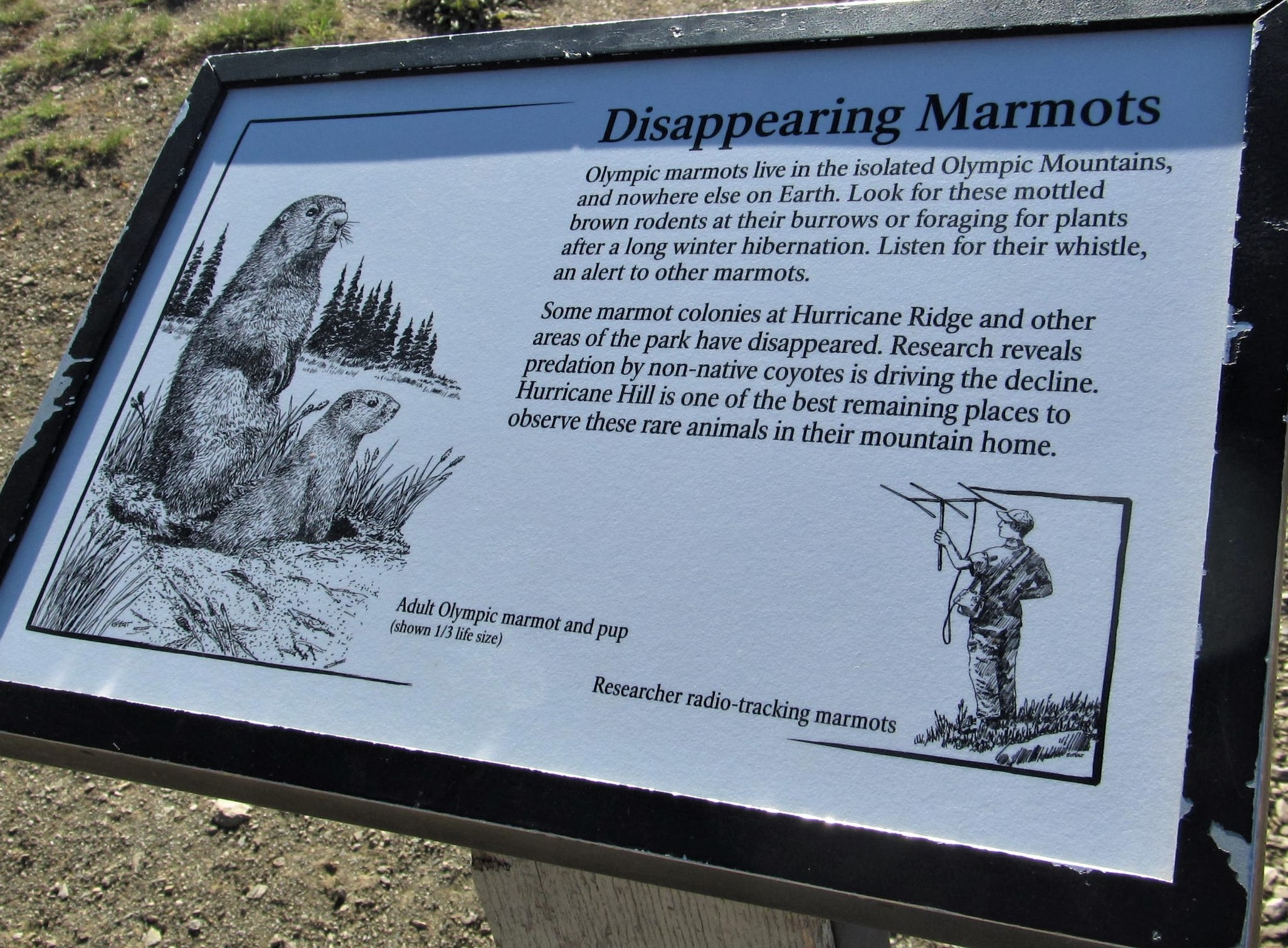
Hurricane Hill is best place to see the Olympic marmot

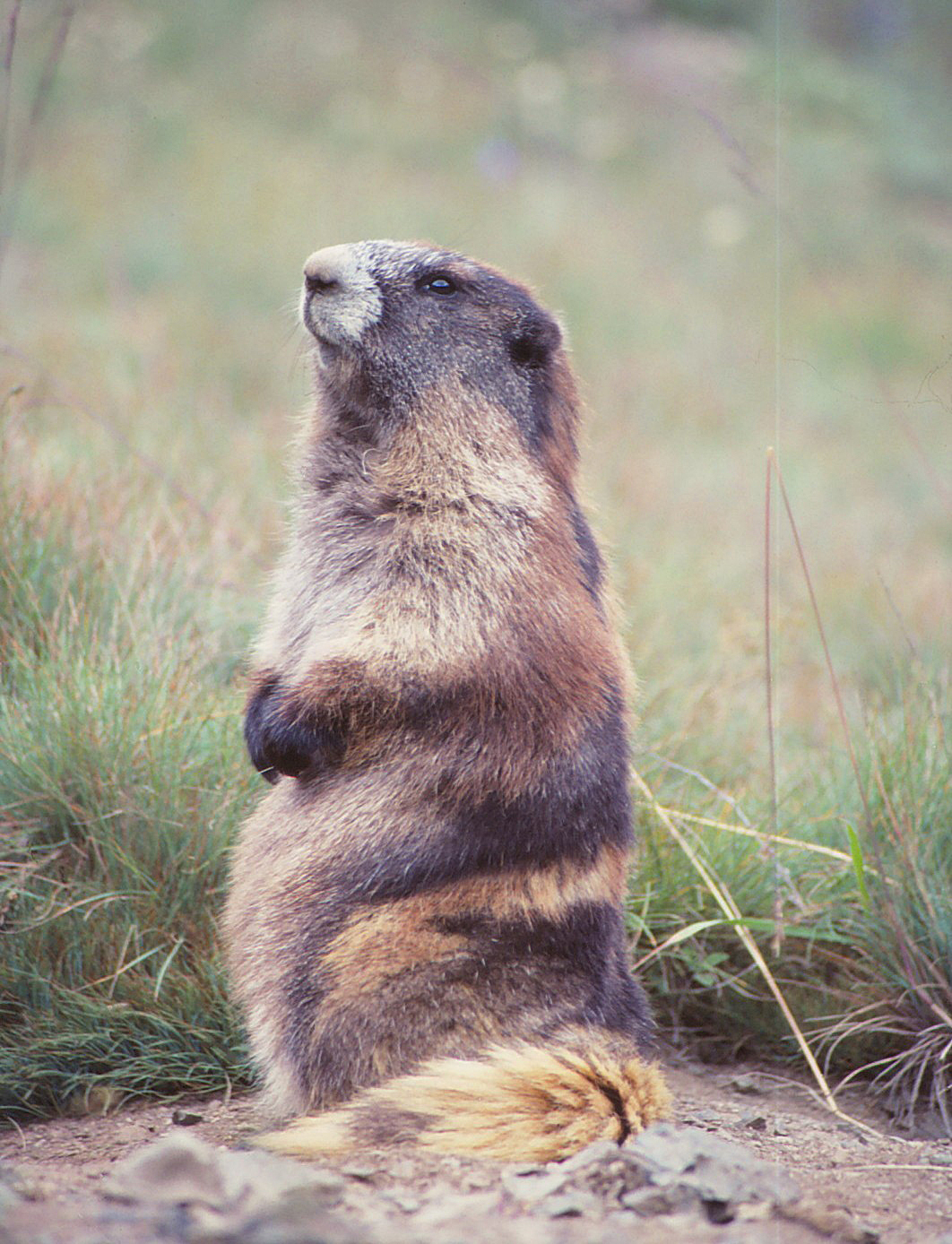
Olympic marmot

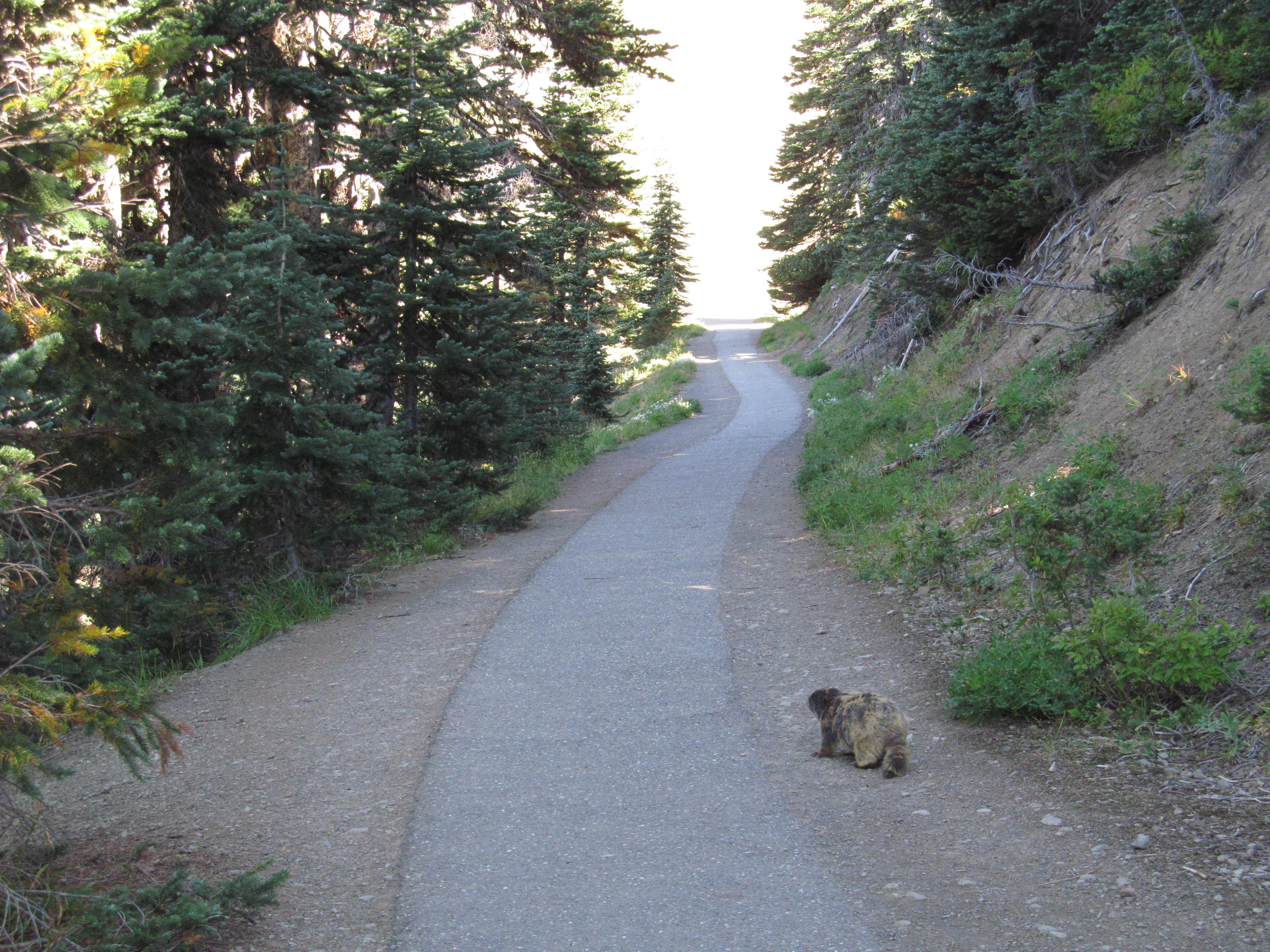
Olympic marmot using the trail to Hurricane Hill

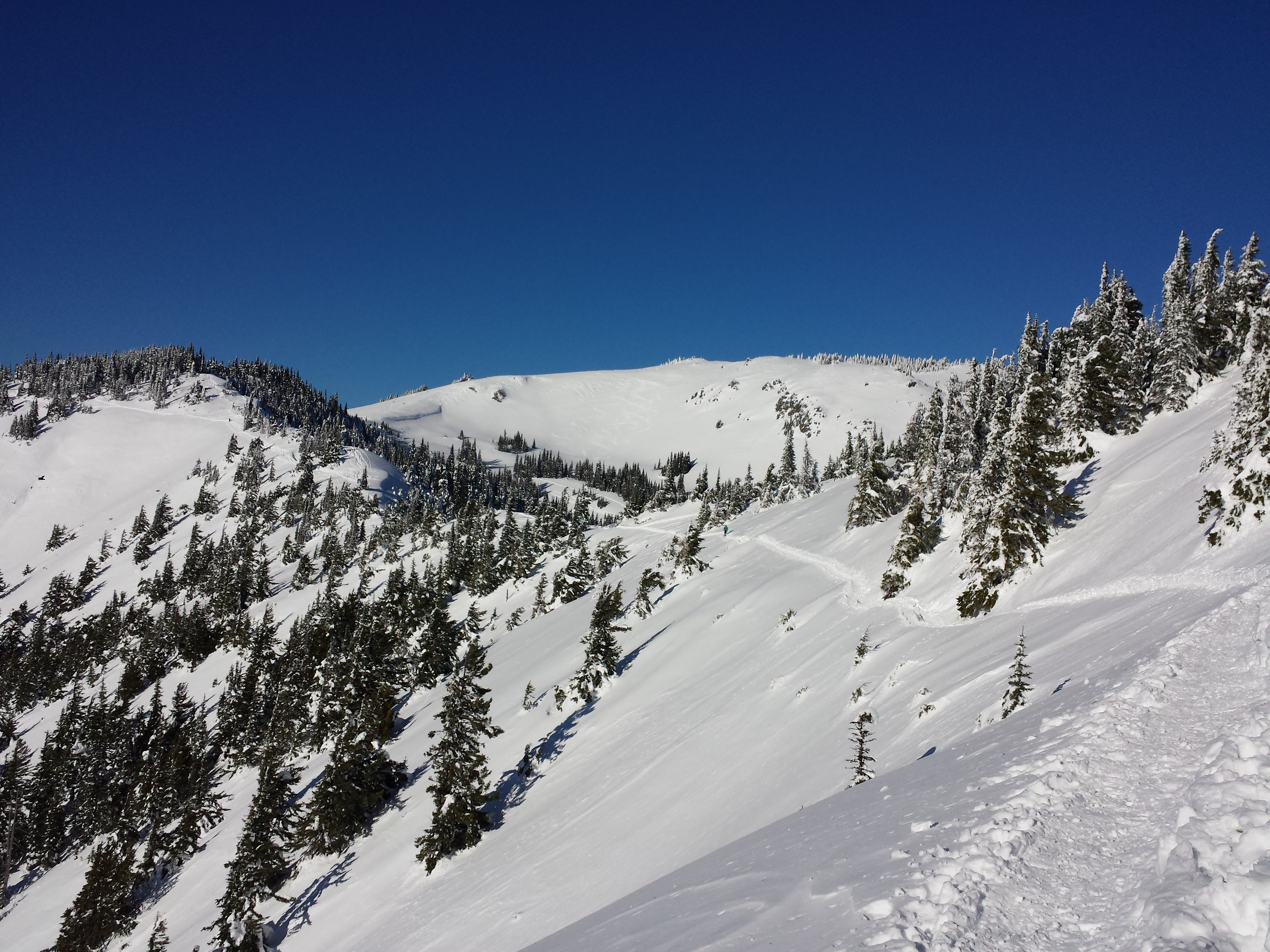
Snowshoe trail with Hurricane Hill in the background
