= Mount Childs =

Mountain in Washington (state), United States

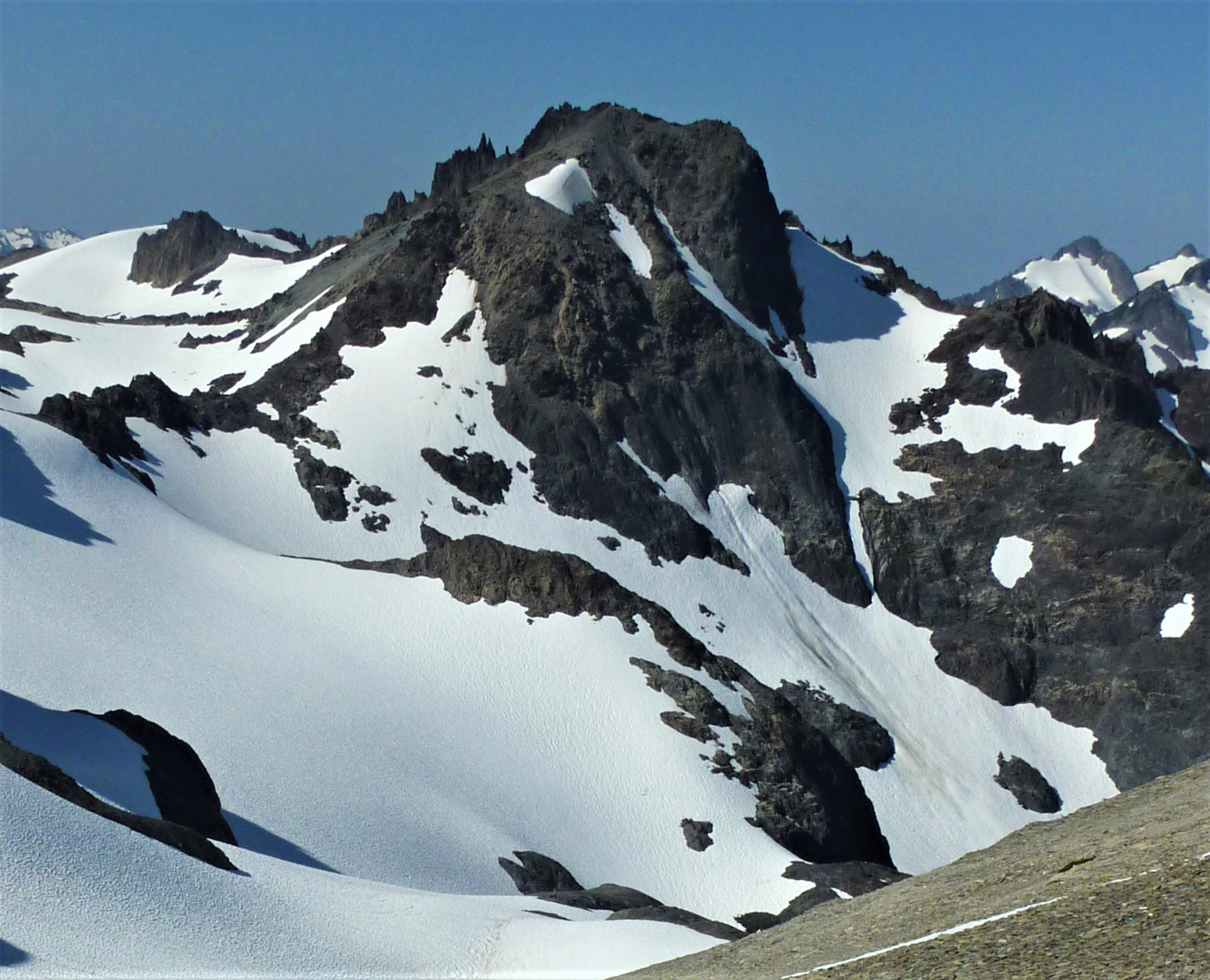
- North aspect

Highest point
- Elevation: 6,193 ft (1,888 m)
- Prominence: 533 ft (162 m)
- Parent peak: Mount Pulitzer (6,283 ft)
- Isolation: 1.71 mi (2.75 km)
- Coordinates: 47°48′44″N 123°35′11″W

Naming
- Etymology: George William Childs

Geography
- Location within Washington (state) Location within the United States
- Country: United States
- State: Washington
- County: Jefferson
- Protected area: Olympic National Park
- Parent range: Olympic Mountains; Bailey Range
- Topo map: USGS Mount Queets

Geology
- Rock age: Eocene

Climbing
- First ascent: 1961
- Easiest route: class 2 scrambling

Mount Childs is a 6,193-foot (1,888-metre) mountain summit in Olympic National Park in Jefferson County of Washington state. Mount Childs is part of the Bailey Range, which is a subrange of the Olympic Mountains, and is set within the Daniel J. Evans Wilderness. Neighbors include line parent Mount Pulitzer, 1.7 mi (2.7 km) to the north, Mount Barnes, 2 mi (3.2 km) to the south, and Mount Olympus is situated 5.6 mi (9.0 km) to the west. Precipitation runoff from the mountain drains west into headwaters of the Hoh River, and east into Goldie River, which is a tributary of the Elwha River. The first ascent of the summit was made August 6, 1961, by Doug Waali, Bob Wood, and Kent Heathershaw via the east slope.

== Etymology ==
A peak was named by the Seattle Press Expedition to honor George William Childs (1829–1894), publisher of the Philadelphia Public Ledger newspaper. That peak is today known instead as Mount Barnes, and Mount Childs now resides two miles north of its original position. The name has not been officially adopted by the United States Board on Geographic Names, so the peak is not labelled on USGS maps.

== Climate ==
Based on the Köppen climate classification, Mount Childs is located in the marine west coast climate zone of western North America. Weather fronts originating in the Pacific Ocean travel northeast toward the Olympic Mountains. As fronts approach, they are forced upward by the peaks (orographic lift), causing them to drop their moisture in the form of rain or snow. As a result, the Olympics experience high precipitation, especially during the winter months in the form of snowfall. Because of maritime influence, snow tends to be wet and heavy, resulting in avalanche danger. During winter months weather is usually cloudy, but due to high pressure systems over the Pacific Ocean that intensify during summer months, there is often little or no cloud cover during the summer.

== Geology ==
The Olympic Mountains are composed of obducted clastic wedge material and oceanic crust, primarily Eocene sandstone, turbidite, and basaltic oceanic crust. The mountains were sculpted during the Pleistocene era by erosion and glaciers advancing and retreating multiple times.

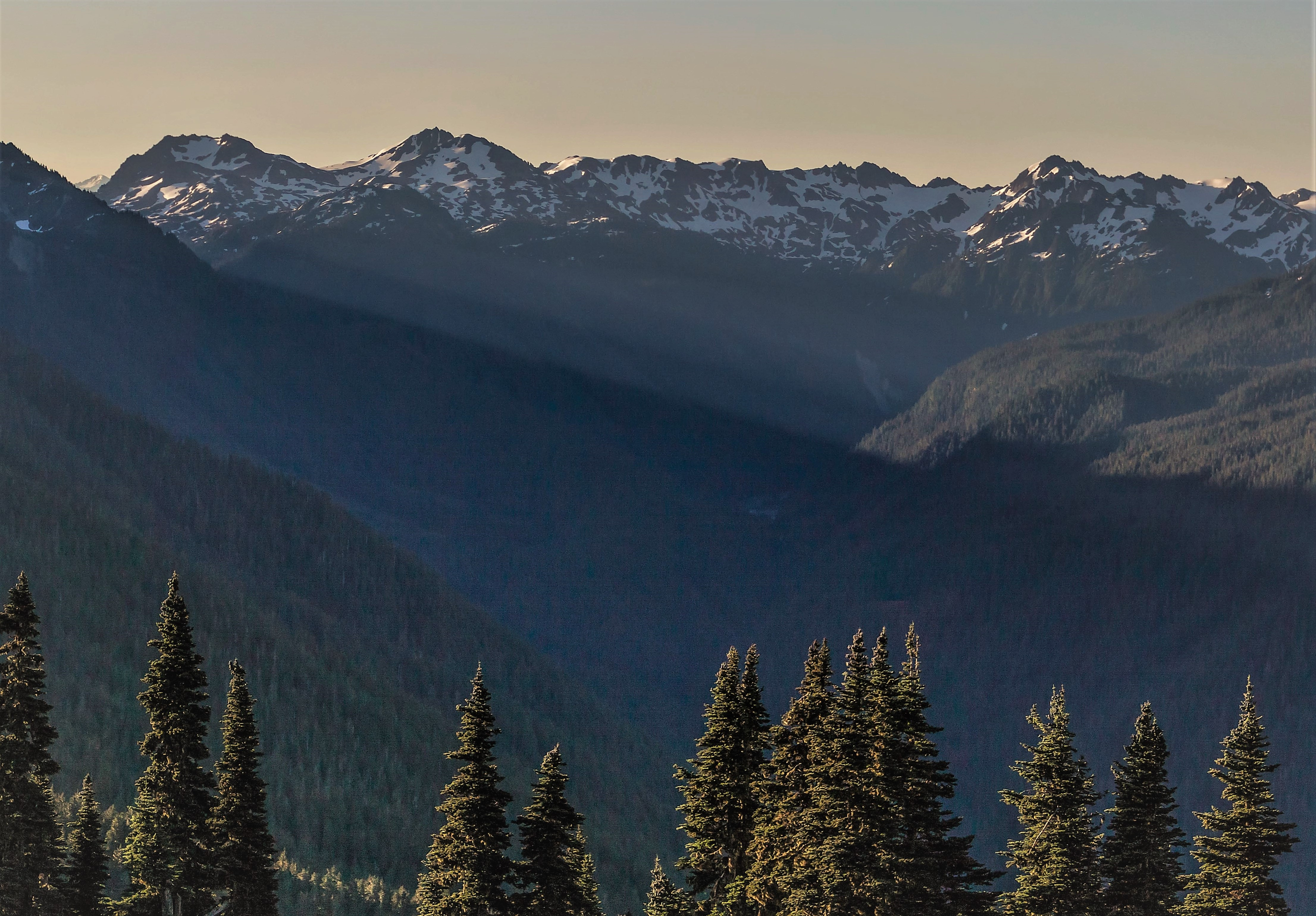
The Bailey Range seen from High Divide featuring Mount Ferry and Mt. Pulitzer to left, and Mt. Childs to the right.

== See also ==
- Olympic Mountains
- Geology of the Pacific Northwest
