= Ludden Peak =

Mountain in Washington (state), United States

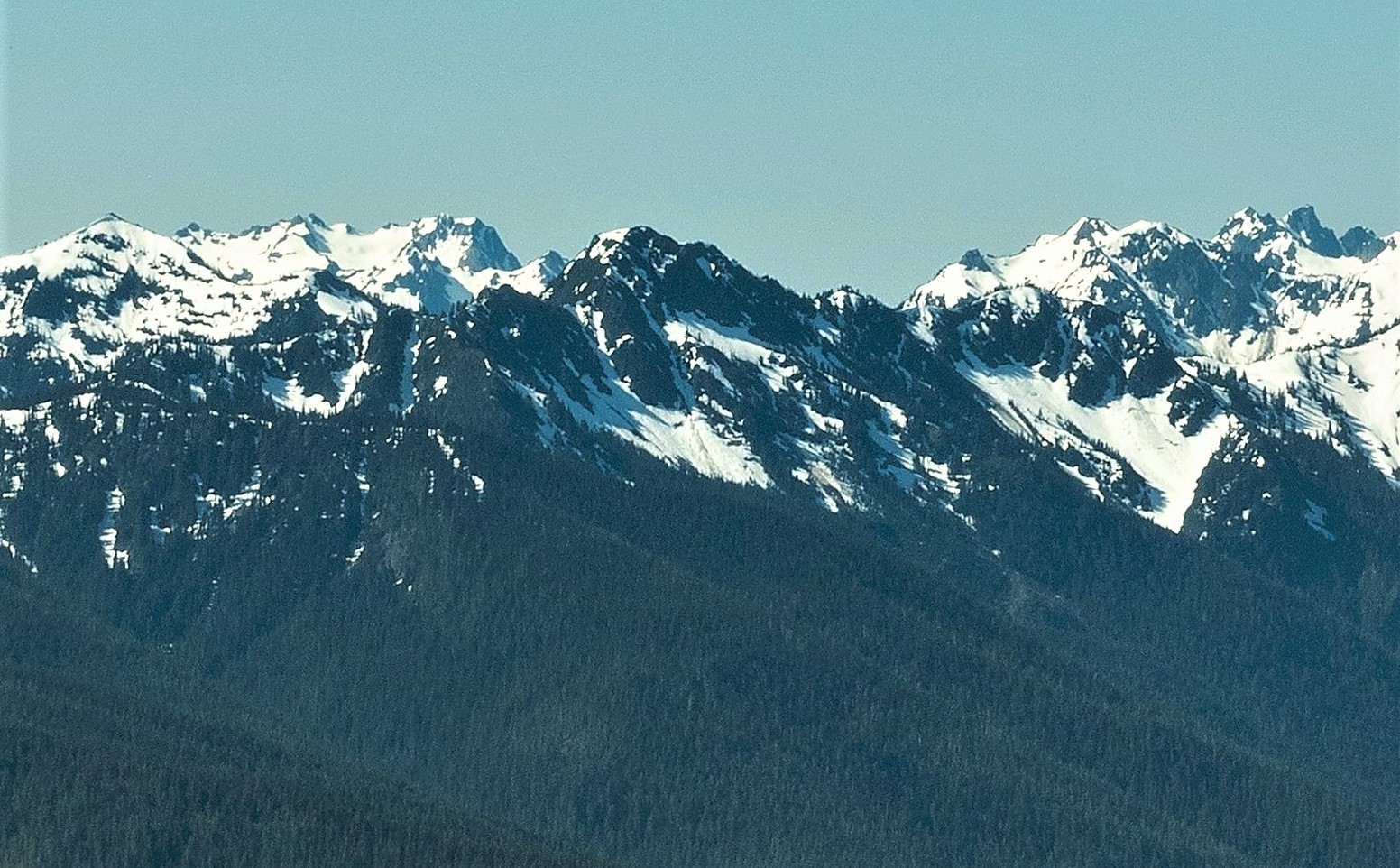
- North aspect (centered), from Hurricane Hill

Highest point
- Elevation: 5,854 ft (1,784 m)
- Prominence: 694 ft (212 m)
- Parent peak: Mount Ferry (6,195 ft)
- Isolation: 1.16 mi (1.87 km)
- Coordinates: 47°51′22″N 123°32′25″W

Naming
- Etymology: Addison "Doc" Ludden

Geography
- Location within Washington (state) Location within the United States
- Country: United States
- State: Washington
- County: Jefferson
- Protected area: Olympic National Park
- Parent range: Olympic Mountains
- Topo map: USGS Mount Queets

Geology
- Rock age: Eocene
- Rock type: Metaconglomerate

Climbing
- First ascent: Unknown
- Easiest route: class 2 via Dodger Point

Ludden Peak is a 5,854-foot (1,784-metre) mountain summit located within Olympic National Park in Jefferson County of Washington state. Ludden Peak is part of the Bailey Range, which is a subrange of the Olympic Mountains, and is set within the Daniel J. Evans Wilderness. In clear weather, the mountain can be seen from the park's visitor center on Hurricane Ridge. The nearest higher neighbor is Mount Scott, one mile to the south-southeast, line parent Mount Ferry rises 1.6 mi (2.6 km) to the southwest, Dodger Point is 1.9 mi (3.1 km) to the northeast, and Stephen Peak is set 2.7 mi (4.3 km) to the northwest. Precipitation runoff from the mountain drains into tributaries of the Elwha River.

== Etymology ==
This peak was originally named "Mount Squire" by the 1889–90 Seattle Press Expedition after Watson Carvosso Squire, US Senator from the state of Washington. However, this geographical feature's name was officially adopted by the U.S. Board on Geographic Names to remember Addison "Doc" Ludden (1851–1927), an early pioneer of the Elwha Valley. Ludden had a mining claim and cabin near the peak. He was buried at Ocean View Cemetery in Port Angeles, Washington.

== Climate ==
Based on the Köppen climate classification, Ludden Peak is located in the marine west coast climate zone of western North America. Weather fronts originating in the Pacific Ocean travel northeast toward the Olympic Mountains. As fronts approach, they are forced upward by the peaks (orographic lift), causing them to drop their moisture in the form of rain or snow. As a result, the Olympics experience high precipitation, especially during the winter months in the form of snowfall. Because of maritime influence, snow tends to be wet and heavy, resulting in avalanche danger. During winter months weather is usually cloudy, but due to high pressure systems over the Pacific Ocean that intensify during summer months, there is often little or no cloud cover during the summer. The months of June through October offer the most favorable weather for viewing and climbing.

== Geology ==
The Olympic Mountains are composed of obducted clastic wedge material and oceanic crust, primarily Eocene sandstone, turbidite, and basaltic oceanic crust. The mountains were sculpted during the Pleistocene era by erosion and glaciers advancing and retreating multiple times. Ludden Peak is composed of hardened metaconglomerate.

== Gallery ==
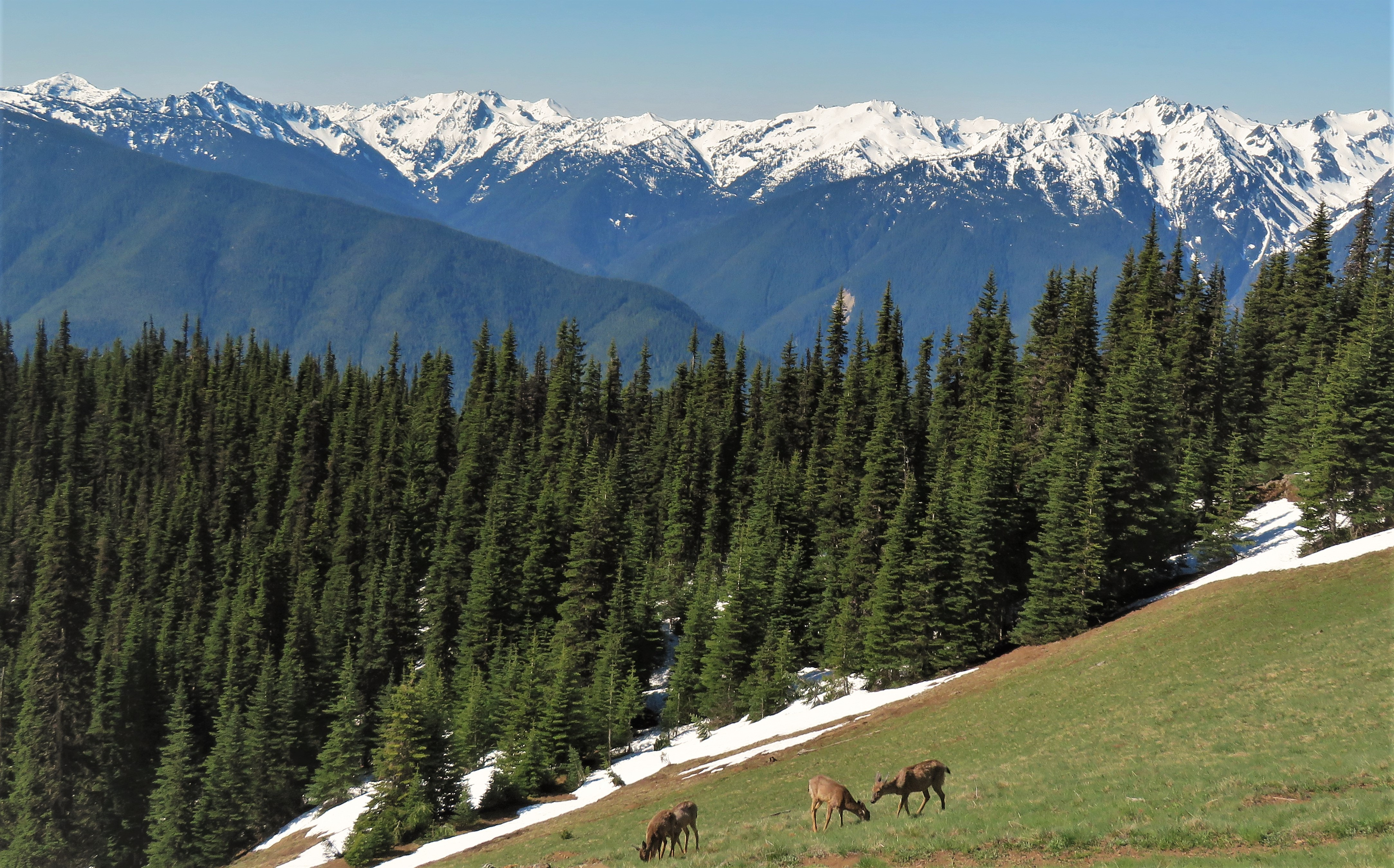
Ludden Peak in upper left

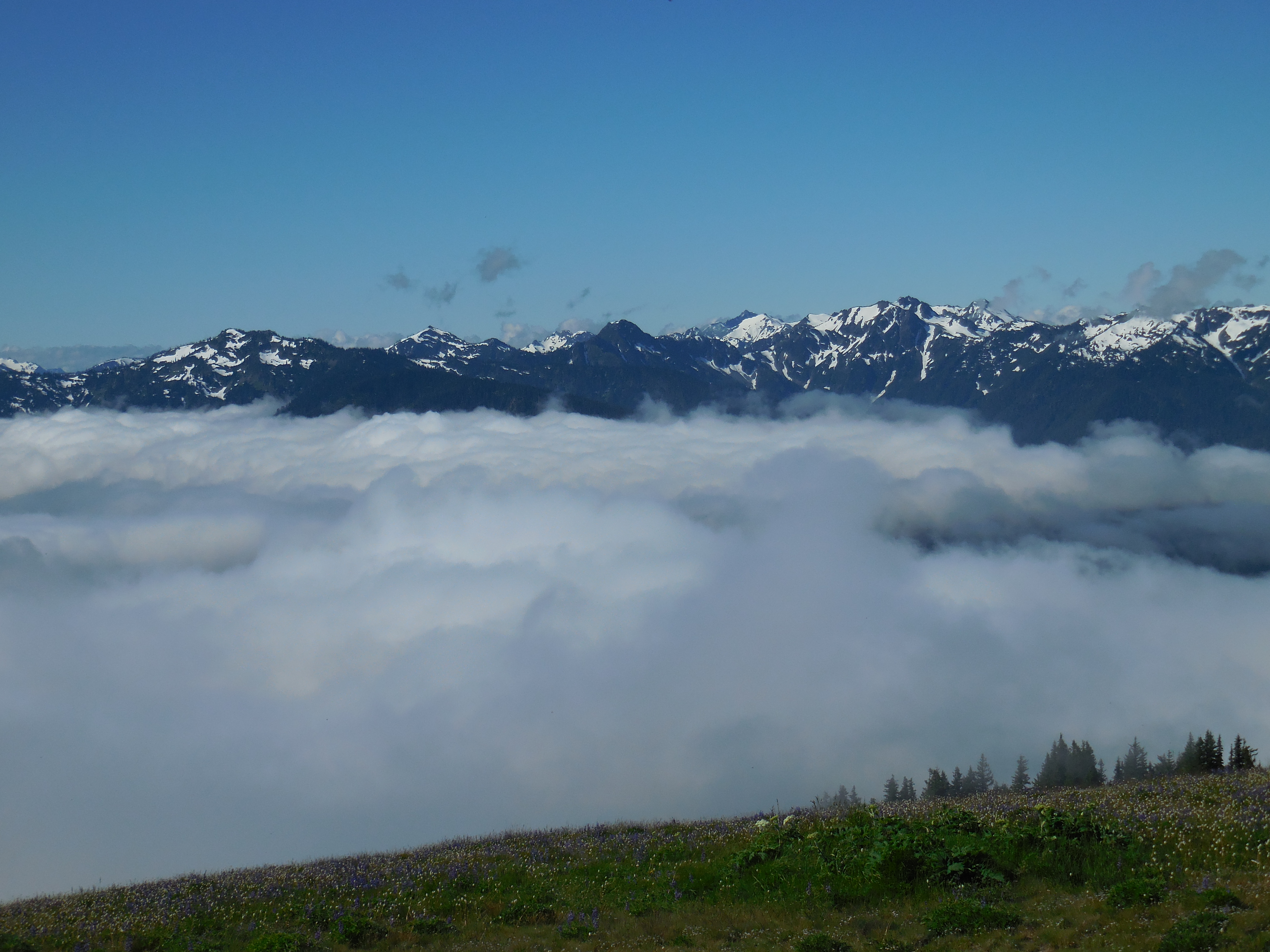
Ludden Peak centered in the distance, viewed from Hurricane Ridge. (Dodger Point on left, Mt. Ferry to right)

== See also ==
- Olympic Mountains
- Geology of the Pacific Northwest
