= Mount Barnes (Washington) =

Mountain in Washington (state), United States

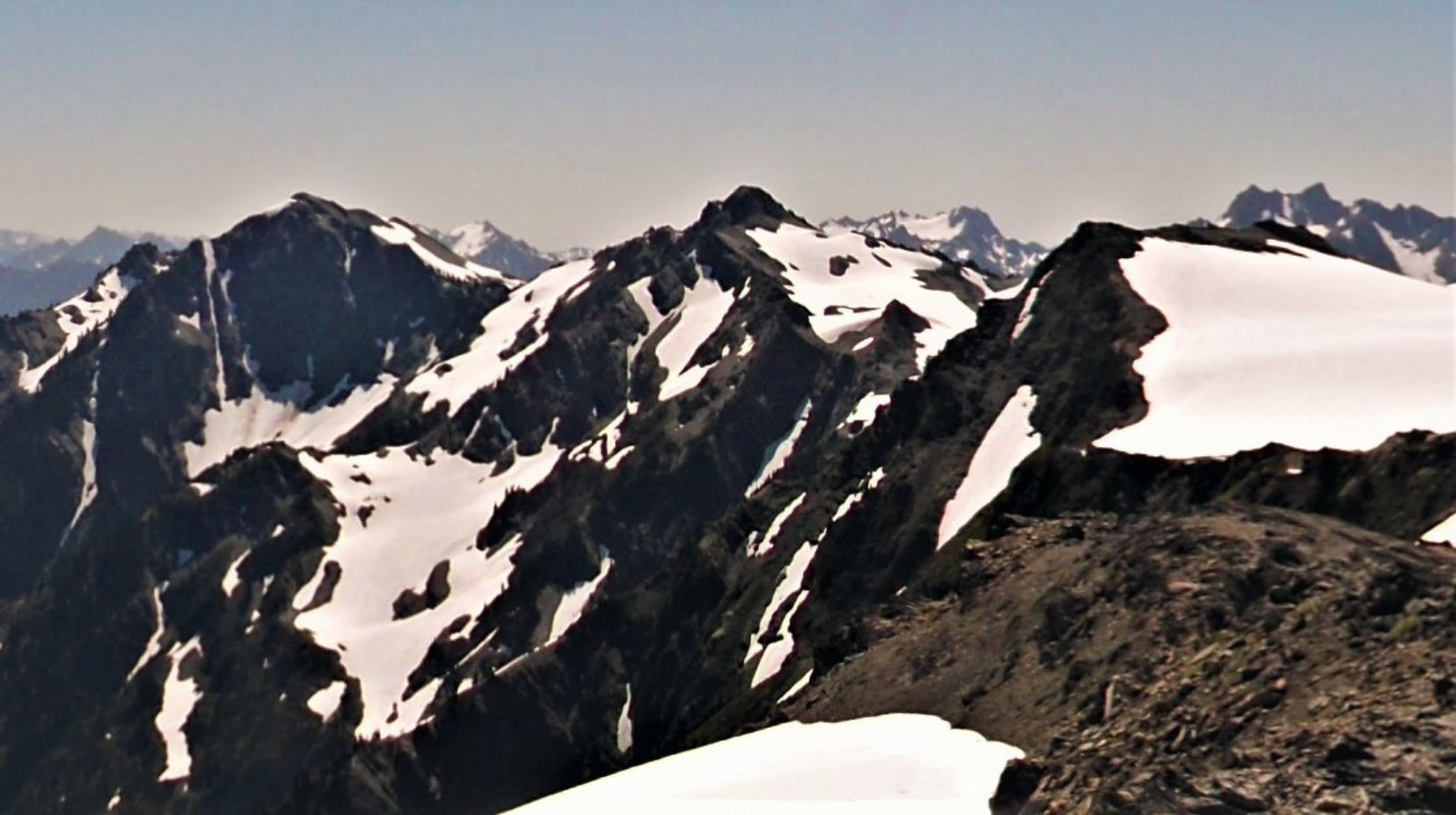
- North aspect, centered

Highest point
- Elevation: 5,987 ft (1,825 m)
- Prominence: 387 ft (118 m)
- Isolation: 0.79 mi (1.27 km)
- Coordinates: 47°47′02″N 123°34′34″W

Naming
- Etymology: Charles A. Barnes

Geography
- Location within Washington (state) Location within the United States
- Country: United States
- State: Washington
- County: Jefferson
- Protected area: Olympic National Park
- Parent range: Olympic Mountains; Bailey Range
- Topo map: USGS Mount Queets

Geology
- Rock age: Eocene

Climbing
- First ascent: Unknown
- Easiest route: class 2 scrambling

Mount Barnes is a 5,987-foot (1,825-metre) mountain summit in Olympic National Park in Jefferson County of Washington state. Mount Barnes is part of the Bailey Range, which is a subrange of the Olympic Mountains, and is set within the Daniel J. Evans Wilderness. Neighbors include Mount Queets, 1.7 mi (2.7 km) to the southwest, and Mount Olympus is set 6.2 mi (10.0 km) to the west. Precipitation runoff from the mountain drains west into the Queets River, south into headwaters of the Elwha River, and northeast into Goldie River which is a tributary of the Elwha. Topographic relief is significant as the summit rises 3,200 feet (975 m) above Elwha Basin in approximately two miles.

== Etymology ==
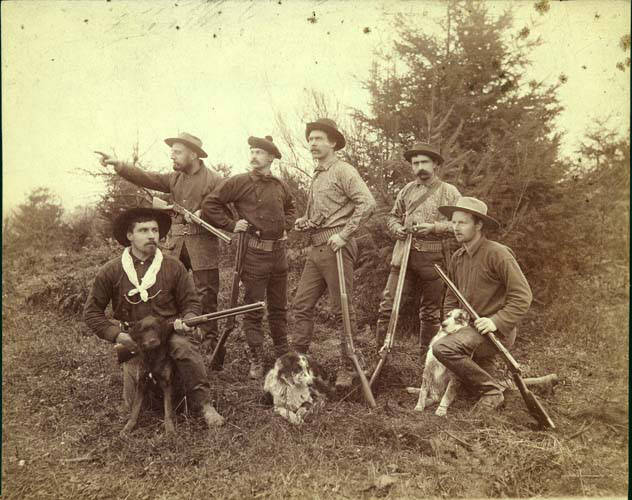
Seattle Press Expedition, C.A. Barnes tallest in center

A peak was named by the Seattle Press Expedition to honor Captain Charles Adams Barnes (1859–1900), the expedition's topographer and historian. In December 1889, he and James Halbold Christie, the leader of the expedition, climbed through deep snow to the ridge just north of the peak, and finally laid eyes on the interior of the range which had been a mystery. Barnes wrote of the spectacle: "Range after range of peaks, snow-clad from base to summit, extended as far as the eye could reach, in splendid confusion." That peak is today known instead as Mount Wilder, and the Mount Barnes of today was originally christened "Mt. Childs" by that same expedition. Mount Childs now rises two miles north of Mount Barnes.

== Climate ==
Based on the Köppen climate classification, Mount Barnes is located in the marine west coast climate zone of western North America. Weather fronts originating in the Pacific Ocean travel northeast toward the Olympic Mountains. As fronts approach, they are forced upward by the peaks (orographic lift), causing them to drop their moisture in the form of rain or snow. As a result, the Olympics experience high precipitation, especially during the winter months in the form of snowfall. Because of maritime influence, snow tends to be wet and heavy, resulting in high avalanche danger. During winter months weather is usually cloudy, but due to high pressure systems over the Pacific Ocean that intensify during summer months, there is often little or no cloud cover during the summer. The months June through August offer the most favorable weather for viewing and climbing.

== Geology ==
The Olympic Mountains are composed of obducted clastic wedge material and oceanic crust, primarily Eocene sandstone, turbidite, and basaltic oceanic crust. The mountains were sculpted during the Pleistocene era by erosion and glaciers advancing and retreating multiple times.

== See also ==
- Geology of the Pacific Northwest
