= Dodger Point =

Mountain in Washington (state), United States

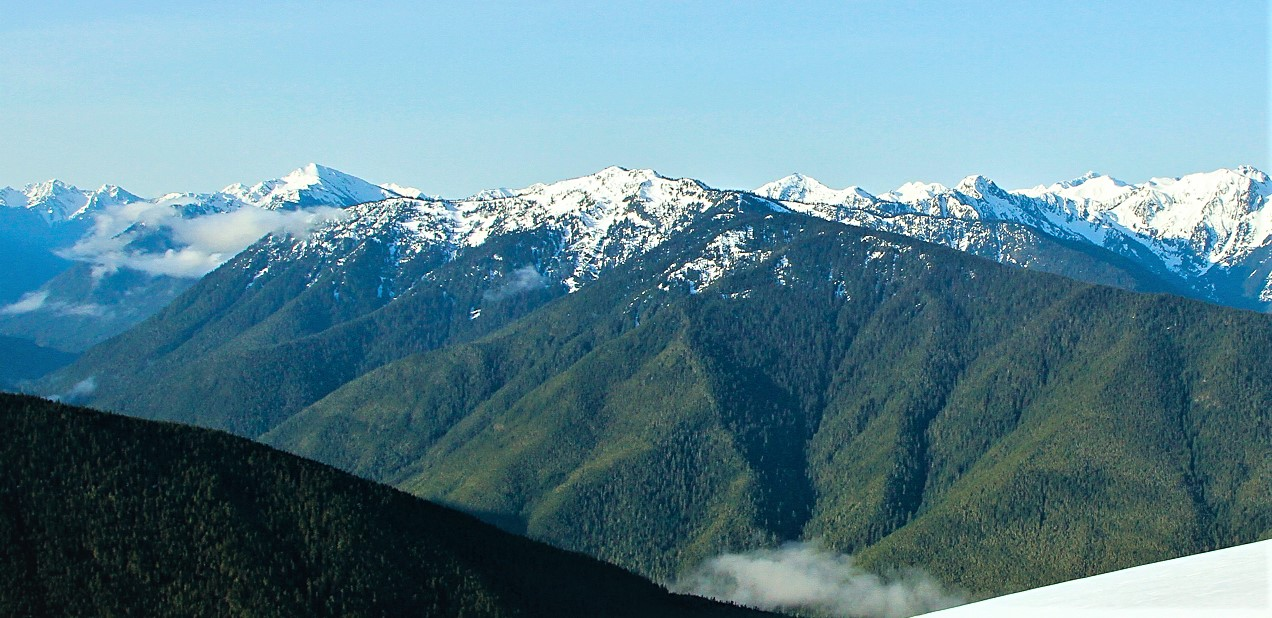
- North aspect (centered), from Hurricane Ridge

Highest point
- Elevation: 5,760 ft (1,756 m)
- Prominence: 820 ft (250 m)
- Parent peak: Ludden Peak (5,854 ft)
- Isolation: 1.88 mi (3.03 km)
- Coordinates: 47°52′26″N 123°30′35″W

Naming
- Etymology: William Bryan "Dodger" Bender

Geography
- Location within Washington (state) Location within the United States
- Country: United States
- State: Washington
- County: Jefferson
- Protected area: Olympic National Park
- Parent range: Olympic Mountains
- Topo map: USGS Mount Queets

Geology
- Rock age: Eocene

Climbing
- Easiest route: class 1 trail

Dodger Point is a 5,760-foot (1,756-metre) mountain summit located within Olympic National Park in Jefferson County of Washington state.

== Description ==
Dodger Point is part of the Bailey Range, which is a subrange of the Olympic Mountains, and is set within the Daniel J. Evans Wilderness. In clear weather, the mountain can be seen from the park's visitor center on Hurricane Ridge. The nearest higher neighbor is line parent Ludden Peak, two miles to the southwest, Mount Scott rises 2.5 mi (4.0 km) to the south-southwest, and Stephen Peak is set four miles to the west. Precipitation runoff from the mountain drains into tributaries of the Elwha River. Topographic relief is significant as the summit rises over 4,300 feet (1,310 m) above the Elwha Valley in approximately 1.5 mile. The Grand Canyon of the Elwha lies near the north base of the mountain.

== Etymology ==
This landform was named by Forest Service District Ranger Sanford Maurice Floe (1896–1975) to honor fellow forest service employee, William Bryan "Dodger" Bender (1896–1930). Bender reportedly discovered an illegal Prohibition-era still in the national forest and was stabbed by the moonshiner, then died a few years later due to complications of losing a lung from the knife attack. He was buried at Ocean View Cemetery in Port Angeles, Washington.

== Dodger Point Fire Lookout ==
The Dodger Point Fire Lookout was built atop the mountain in 1933. During World War II, the lookout was used as an Aircraft Warning Service station in 1942–43. The Dodger Point and Pyramid Peak Lookouts are the only stations remaining in Olympic National Park of the thirteen that were constructed.

== Climate ==
Based on the Köppen climate classification, Dodger Point is located in the marine west coast climate zone of western North America. Weather fronts originating in the Pacific Ocean travel northeast toward the Olympic Mountains. As fronts approach, they are forced upward by the peaks (orographic lift), causing them to drop their moisture in the form of rain or snow. As a result, the Olympics experience high precipitation, especially during the winter months in the form of snowfall. Because of maritime influence, snow tends to be wet and heavy, resulting in avalanche danger. During winter months weather is usually cloudy, but due to high pressure systems over the Pacific Ocean that intensify during summer months, there is often little or no cloud cover during the summer. The months July through September offer the most favorable weather for viewing and climbing.

== Gallery ==
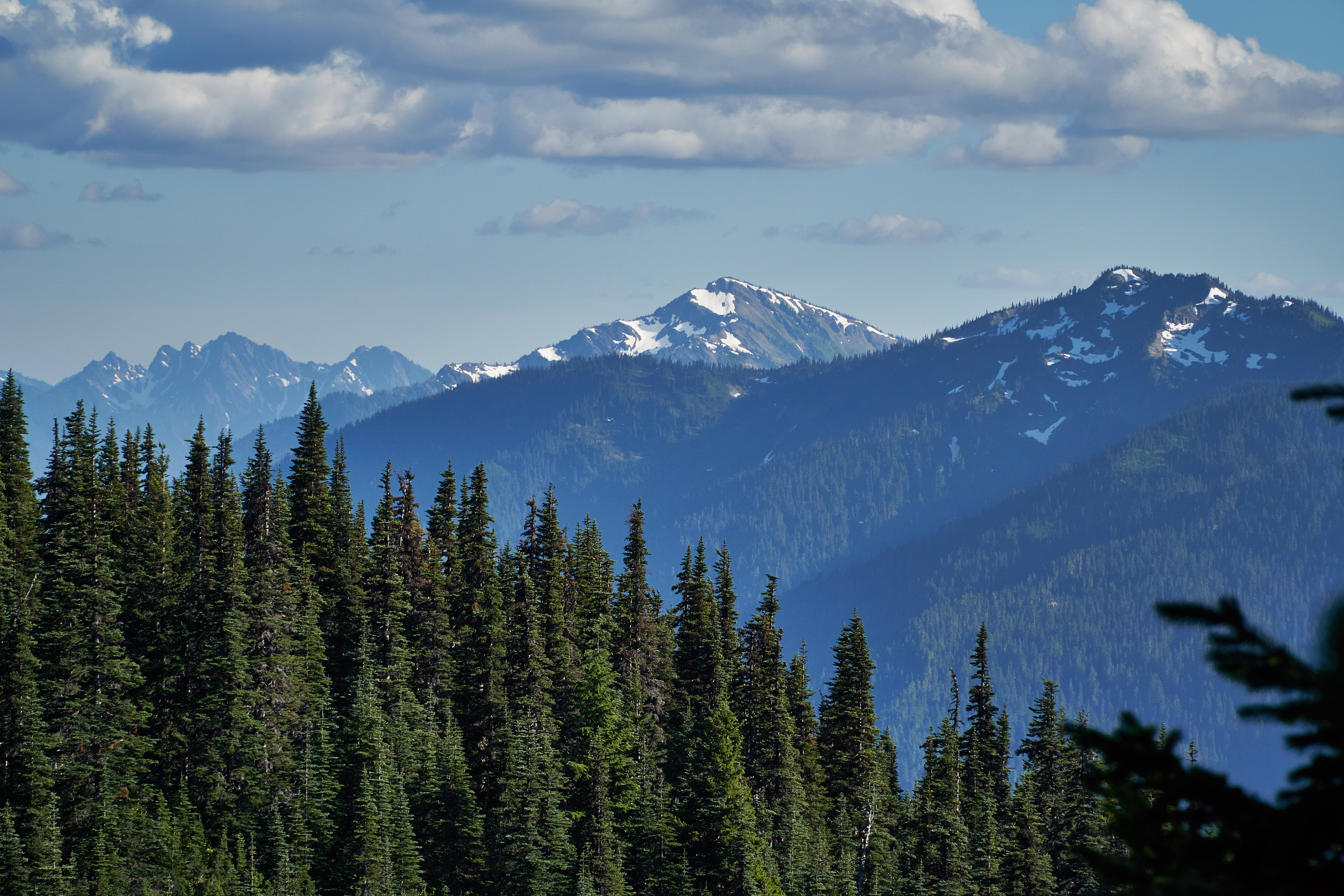
Mt. Dana centered with Dodger Point to the right

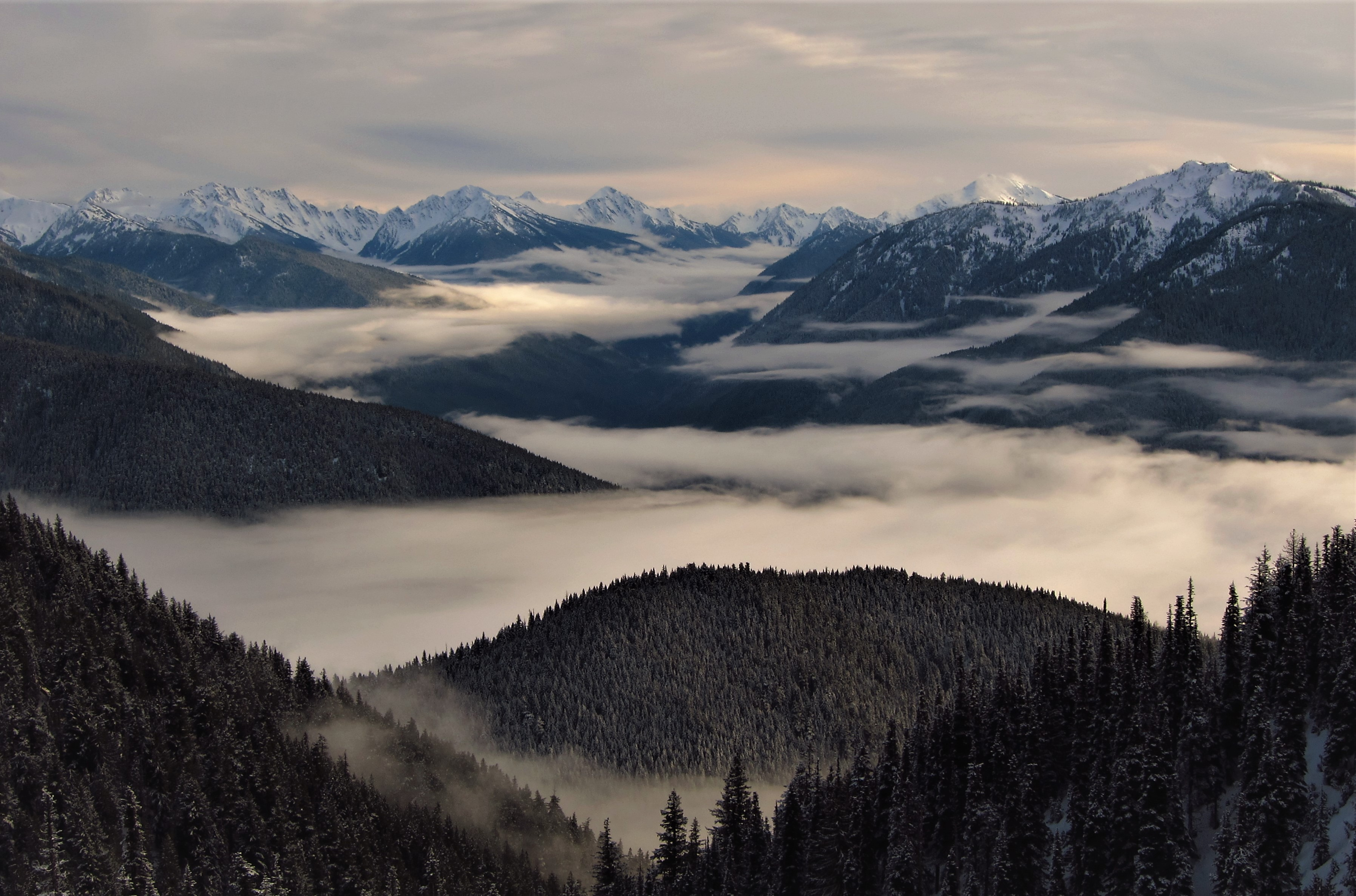
Clouds in Elwha Valley, with Dodger Point far right

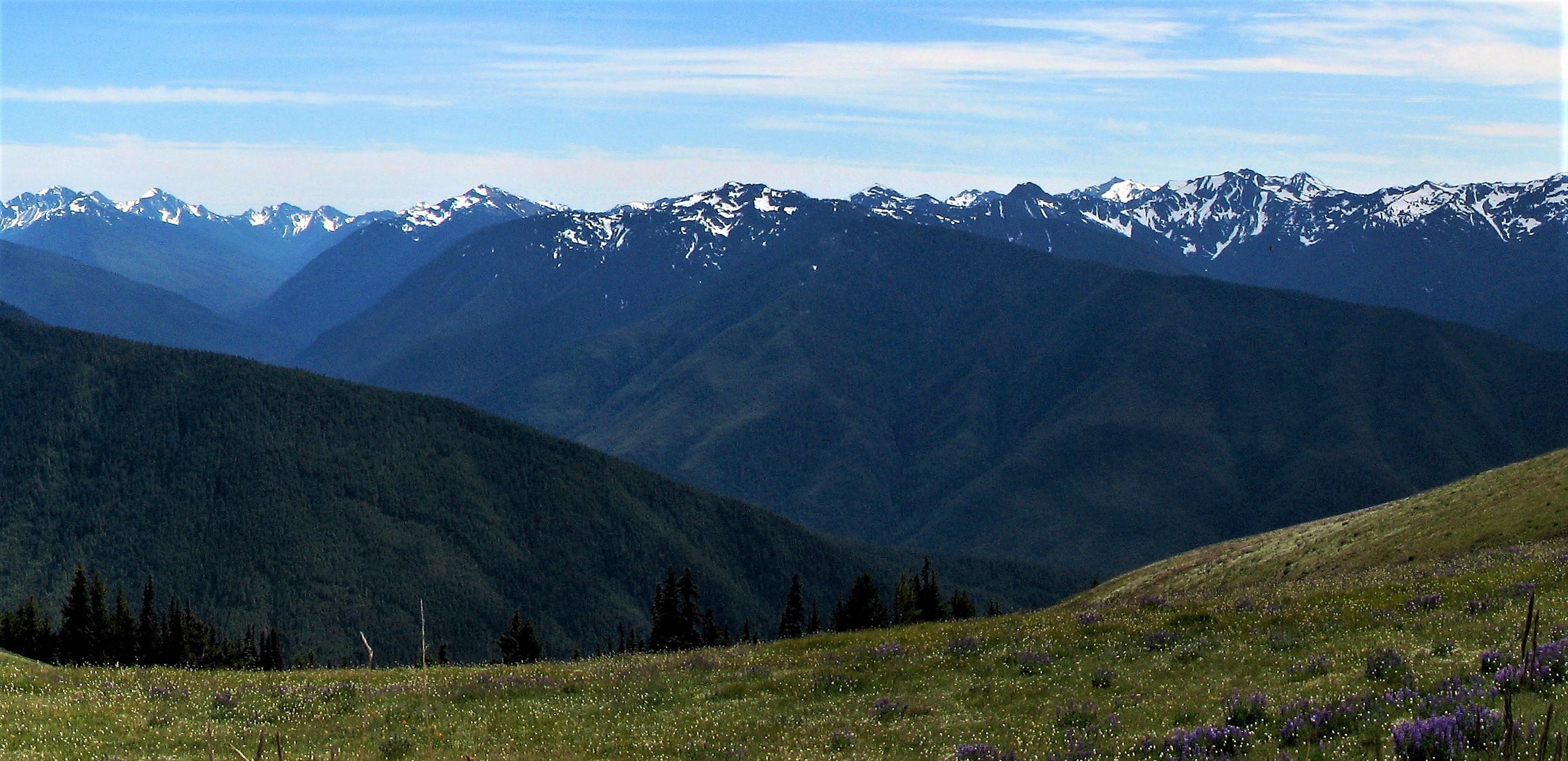
Dodger Point centered, from Hurricane Ridge

== See also ==
- Olympic Mountains
- Geology of the Pacific Northwest
