= Mount Scott (Washington) =

Mountain in Washington (state), United States

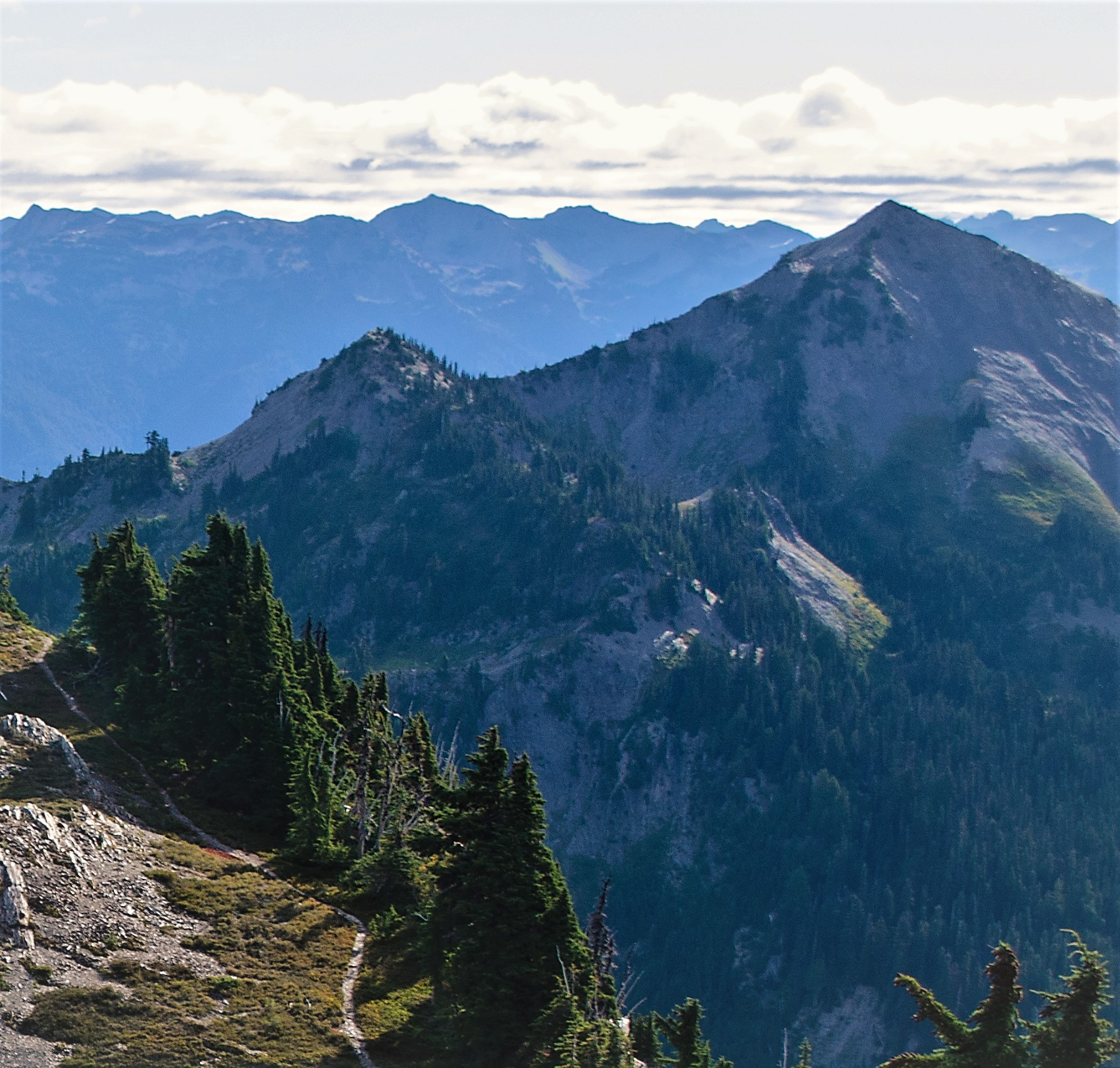
- West aspect

Highest point
- Elevation: 5,913 ft (1,802 m)
- Prominence: 1,173 ft (358 m)
- Parent peak: Mount Ferry (6,195 ft)
- Isolation: 1.79 mi (2.88 km)
- Coordinates: 47°50′28″N 123°31′47″W

Naming
- Etymology: James Wilmot Scott

Geography
- Location within Washington (state) Location within the United States
- Country: United States
- State: Washington
- County: Jefferson
- Protected area: Olympic National Park
- Parent range: Olympic Mountains
- Topo map: USGS Mount Queets

Geology
- Rock age: Eocene

Climbing
- Easiest route: class 2 scrambling

Mount Scott is a 5,913-foot (1,802-metre) mountain summit located within Olympic National Park in Jefferson County of Washington state.

== Description ==
Mount Scott is part of the Bailey Range, which is a subrange of the Olympic Mountains, and is set within the Daniel J. Evans Wilderness. The nearest higher neighbor is line parent Mount Ferry, 1.8 mi (2.9 km) to the west, Ludden Peak is set one mile to the north, and Mount Pulitzer rises two miles to the west-southwest. Precipitation runoff from the mountain drains into tributaries of the Goldie River, which in turn is a tributary of the Elwha River. Topographic relief is significant as the summit rises 4,300 feet (1,310 m) above the Elwha Valley in approximately two miles.

== Climate ==
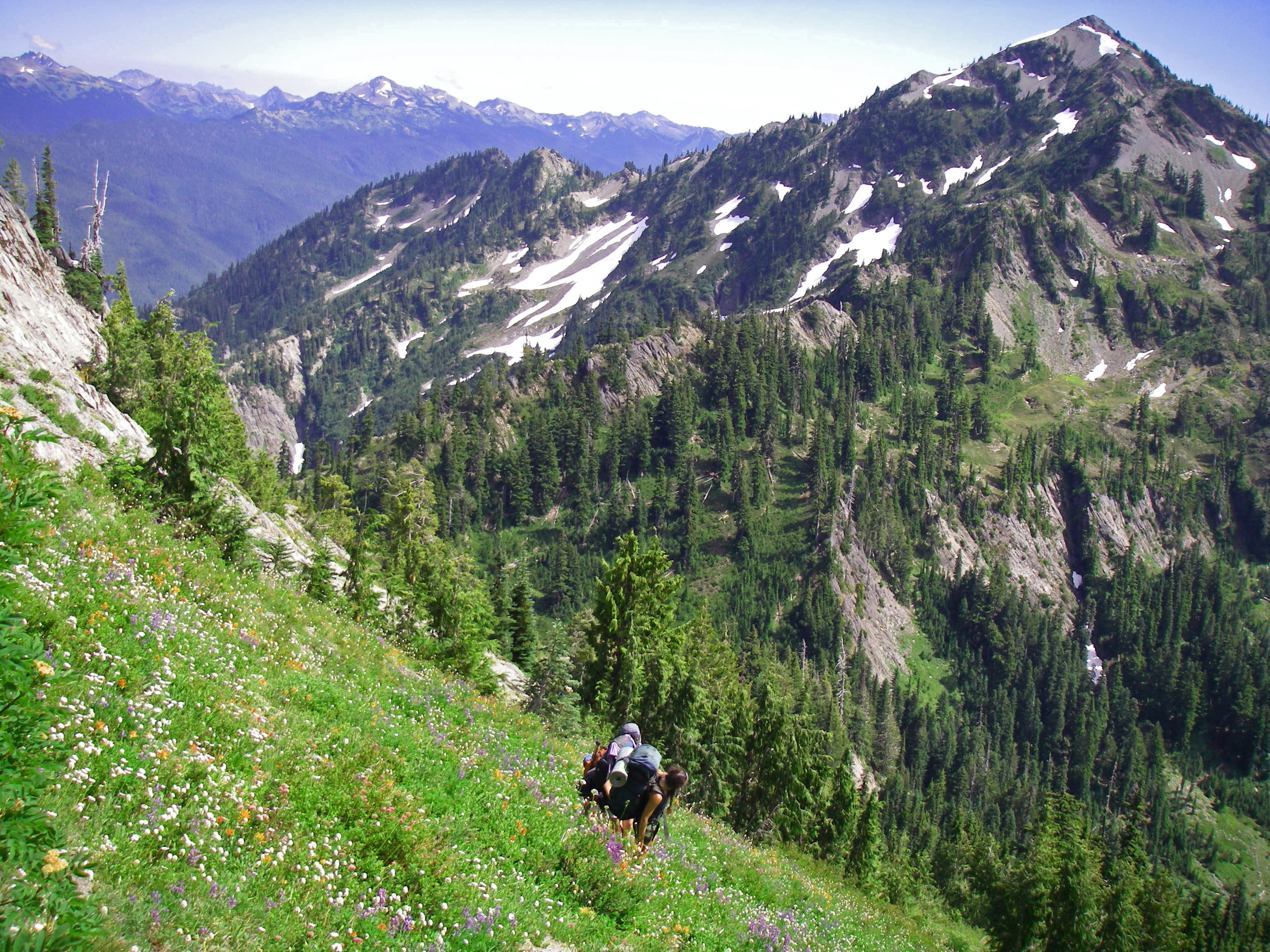
Northwest aspect seen from the side of Ludden Peak

Based on the Köppen climate classification, Mount Scott is located in the marine west coast climate zone of western North America. Weather fronts originating in the Pacific Ocean travel northeast toward the Olympic Mountains. As fronts approach, they are forced upward by the peaks (orographic lift), causing them to drop their moisture in the form of rain or snow. As a result, the Olympics experience high precipitation, especially during the winter months in the form of snowfall. Because of maritime influence, snow tends to be wet and heavy, resulting in avalanche danger. During winter months weather is usually cloudy, but due to high pressure systems over the Pacific Ocean that intensify during summer months, there is often little or no cloud cover during the summer.

== Geology ==
The Olympic Mountains are composed of obducted clastic wedge material and oceanic crust, primarily Eocene sandstone, turbidite, and basaltic oceanic crust. The mountains were sculpted during the Pleistocene era by erosion and glaciers advancing and retreating multiple times.

== Etymology ==
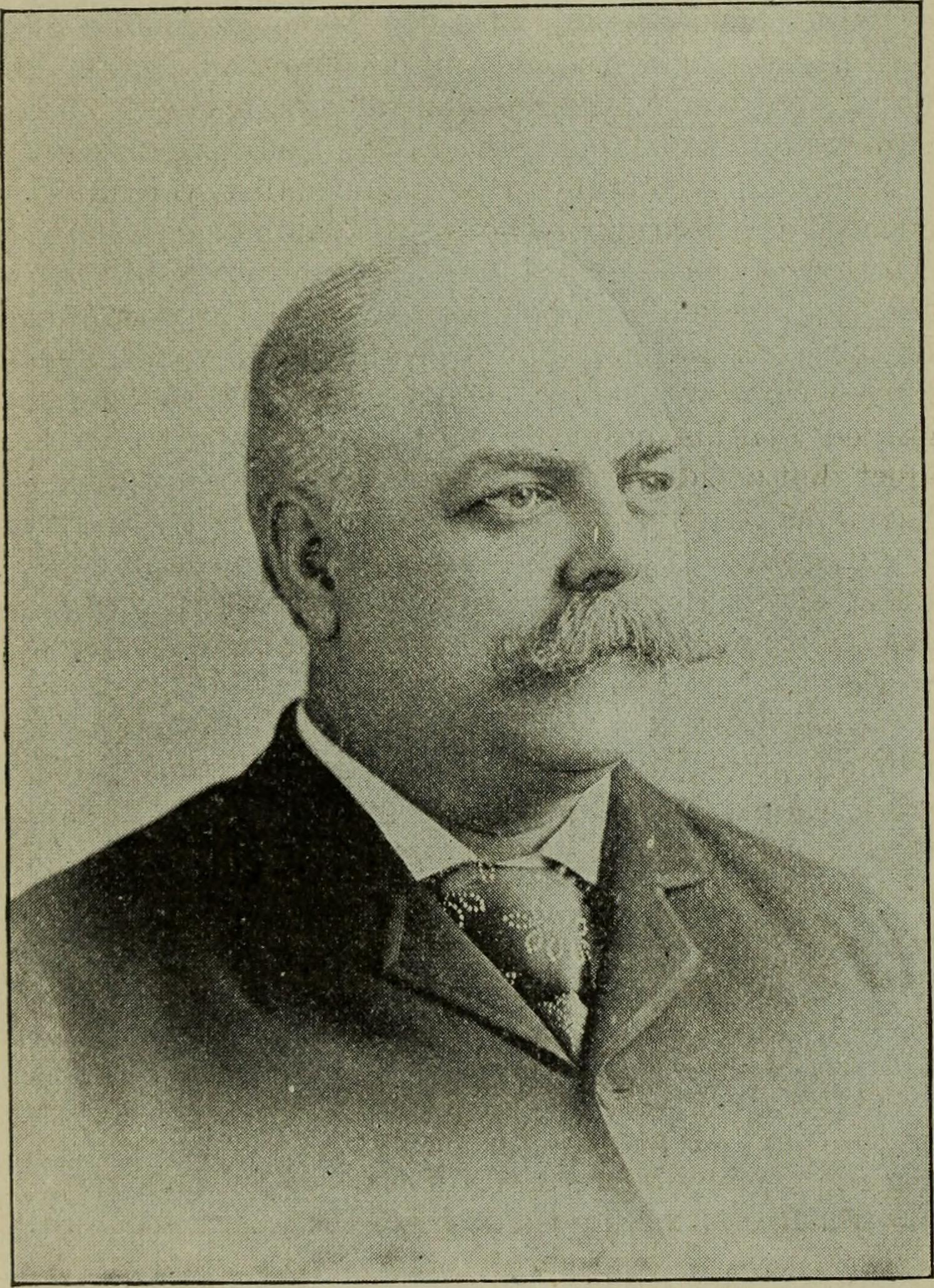
James Scott

This peak was named by the 1889–90 Seattle Press Expedition for James Wilmot Scott, editor and publisher of the Chicago Herald, a newspaper he started in 1881.

This geographical feature's name has been officially adopted by the U.S. Board on Geographic Names.

== See also ==
- Geology of the Pacific Northwest
