= Bailey Range =

Mountain range in Washington (state), United States

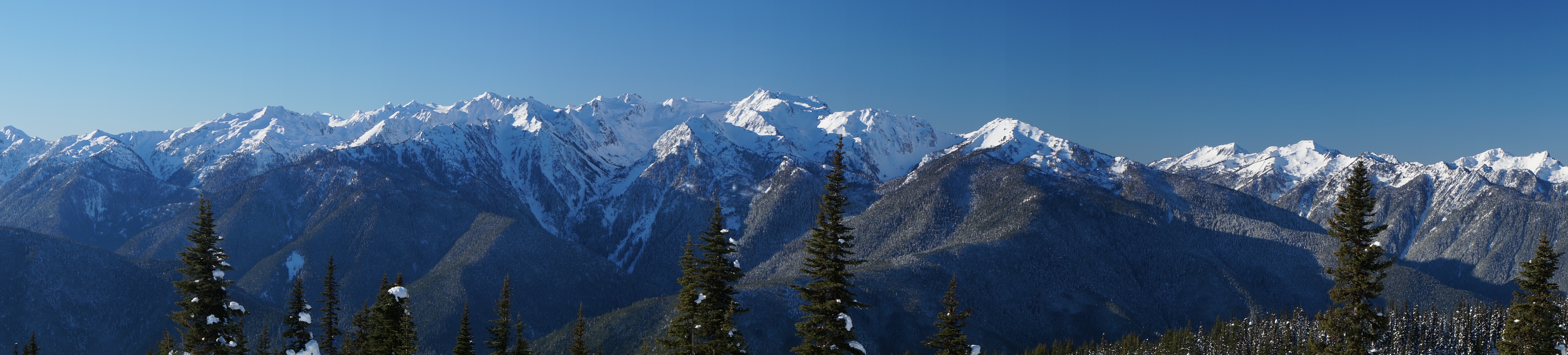
- Bailey Range seen from Hurricane Ridge

Highest point
- Peak: Mount Carrie
- Elevation: 6,995 ft (2,132 m)
- Coordinates: 47°53′39″N 123°38′57″W

Dimensions
- Length: 17 mi (27 km) North-South
- Width: 12 mi (19 km) East-West

Geography
- Location within Washington (state) Location within the United States
- Location: Olympic National Park; Clallam / Jefferson Counties
- Country: United States
- State: Washington
- Range coordinates: 47°53′21″N 123°38′43″W
- Parent range: Olympic Mountains

Geology
- Rock age: Eocene

The Bailey Range is a mountain range located within Olympic National Park in Washington state.

== Description ==
The Bailey Range is a subrange of the Olympic Mountains. These remote mountains are situated within the Daniel J. Evans Wilderness, but can be seen from the park's Hurricane Ridge visitor center. Precipitation runoff from the range drains into the Elwha, Queets, and Hoh Rivers. The Bailey Range Traverse is an off-trail alpine trek which may require ice axe and crampons, except in late summer when snowpack has melted. This 15-mile route made popular in the 1970s is considered the finest alpine route in the Olympics, and its spectacular scenery has been featured in television and motion pictures such as the 1952 Disney natural history movie, "The Olympic Elk."

== History ==
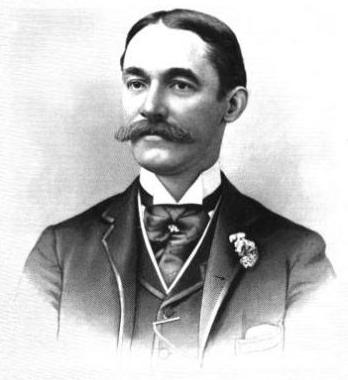
William E. Bailey, 1890

This geographical feature's name was officially adopted in 1961 by the U.S. Board on Geographic Names. It is named for William Elder Bailey (born February 10, 1860), proprietor of the Seattle Press, the state's primary newspaper in 1889 when the paper printed a request from the governor of Washington, Elisha P. Ferry, for men to cross and explore the Olympic Mountains. In response to Ferry's expressed interest in the interior of the Olympic Peninsula, the Seattle Press newspaper published a story in the fall of 1889 challenging any "hardy citizens to acquire fame by unveiling the mystery which wraps the land encircled by the snow-capped Olympic range." The newspaper then sponsored the 1889–90 Seattle Press Expedition to explore the unknown interior of the Olympic Range, and on April 27, 1890, the members of the expedition named the Bailey Range, which is considered the backbone of the Olympics. The expedition, led by James Halbold Christie and Charles Adams Barnes, also named Mount Christie, Mount Barnes, Mount Ferry, Mount Seattle, Mount Meany, Mount Noyes, Mount Dana, and Mount Scott.

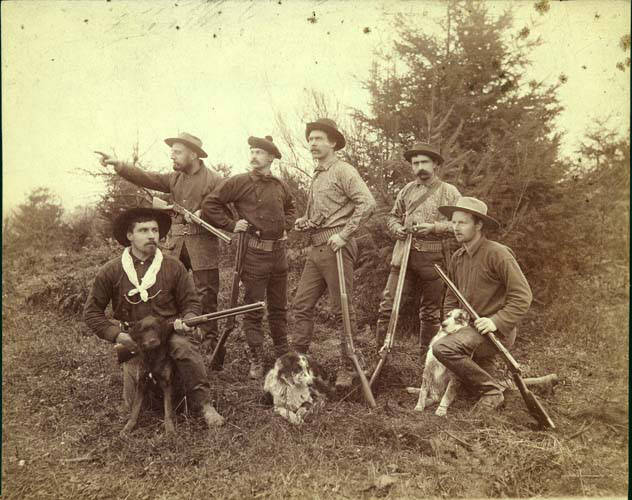
Seattle Press Exploring Expedition, 1889

The Bailey Range was first traversed by Billy Everett in 1885, who at the age of 16 reached Cream Lake, and some claim he was the first to climb Mount Carrie and Mount Fitzhenry.

== Climate ==
Based on the Köppen climate classification, the Bailey Range is located in the marine west coast climate zone of western North America. Most weather fronts originate in the Pacific Ocean, and travel east toward the Olympic Peninsula. As fronts approach, they are forced upward by the peaks, causing moisture to drop in the form of rain or snowfall (Orographic lift). As a result, the range experiences high precipitation, especially during the winter months. Due to heavy winter snowfalls, the Bailey Range supports the Carrie Glacier, Fairchild Glacier, and several glacier remnants. During winter months, weather is usually cloudy, but due to high pressure systems over the Pacific Ocean that intensify during summer months, there is often little or no cloud cover during the summer. The months July through September offer the most favorable weather for visiting the Bailey Range.

== Mountains ==
Principal summits of the Bailey Range:

| Name | Elevation | Prominence | Reference |
|---|---|---|---|
| Mount Carrie | 6,995 ft | 1,675 ft | |
| Mount Fairchild | 6,900 ft | 450 ft | |
| Ruth Peak | 6,850 ft | 250 ft | |
| Stephen Peak | 6,418 ft | 638 ft | |
| Mount Pulitzer | 6,283 ft | 923 ft | |
| Mount Dana | 6,213 ft | 1,529 ft | |
| Mount Ferry | 6,195 ft | 395 ft | |
| Mount Childs | 6,193 ft | 513 ft | |
| Mount Fitzhenry | 6,050 ft | 450 ft | |
| Mount Barnes | 5,987 ft | 387 ft | |
| Mount Wilder | 5,939 ft | 939 ft | |
| Mount Scott | 5,913 ft | 1,153 ft | |
| Cat Peak | 5,900 ft | 750 ft | |
| Ludden Peak | 5,854 ft | 674 ft | |
| Dodger Point | 5,760 ft | 780 ft | |

== Geology ==
The Olympic Mountains are composed of obducted clastic wedge material and oceanic crust, primarily Eocene sandstone, turbidite, and basaltic oceanic crust. The mountains were sculpted during the Pleistocene era by erosion and glaciers advancing and retreating multiple times.

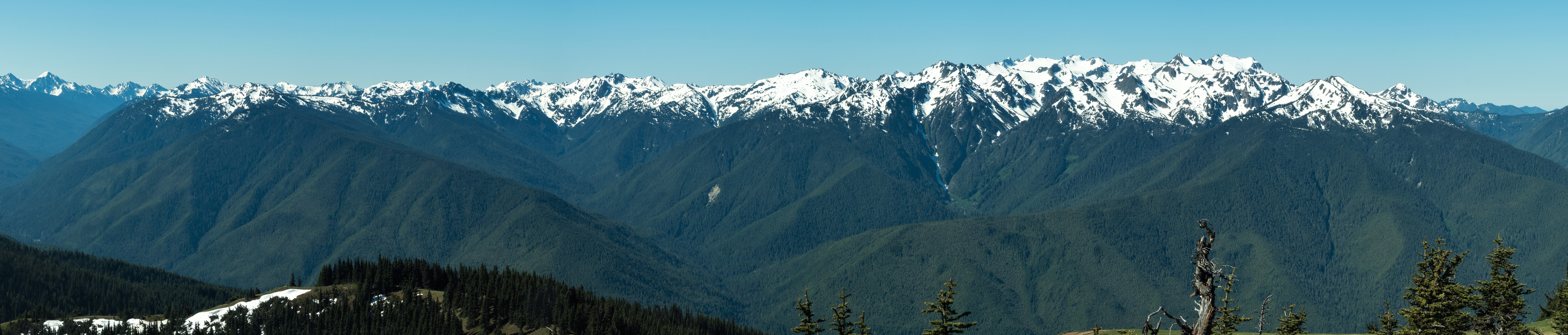
Bailey Range seen from Hurricane Hill

== See also ==
- Geology of the Pacific Northwest
