= Mount Wilder =

Mountain in Washington (state), United States

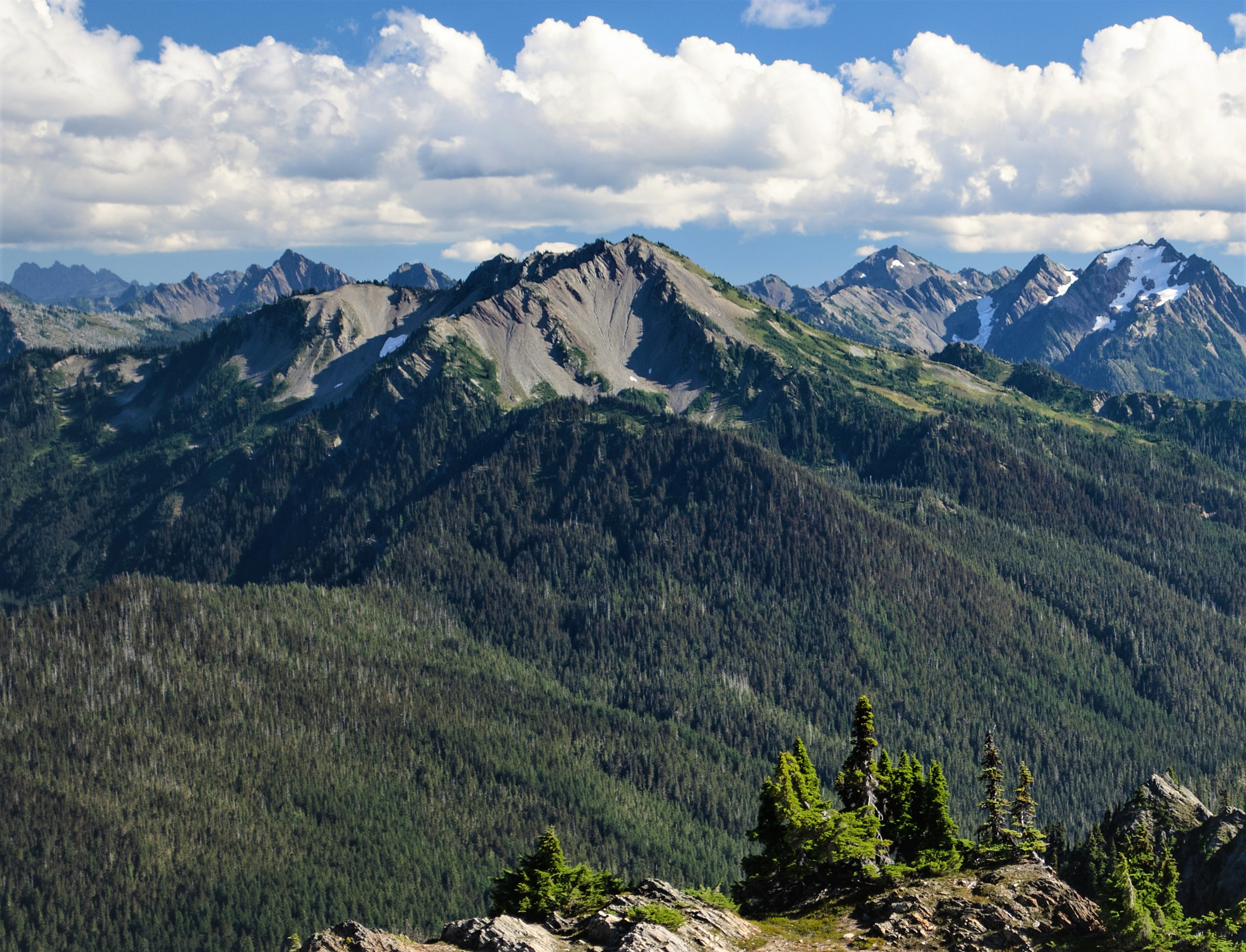
- North aspect

Highest point
- Elevation: 5,939 ft (1,810 m)
- Prominence: 939 ft (286 m)
- Parent peak: Mount Dana (6,213 ft)
- Isolation: 2.08 mi (3.35 km)
- Coordinates: 47°46′03″N 123°31′11″W

Naming
- Etymology: Unknown

Geography
- Location within Washington (state) Location within the United States
- Country: United States
- State: Washington
- County: Jefferson
- Protected area: Olympic National Park
- Parent range: Olympic Mountains
- Topo map: USGS Mount Queets

Geology
- Rock age: Eocene

Climbing
- First ascent: Unknown
- Easiest route: class 2 South ridge

Mount Wilder is a 5,939-foot (1,810-metre) mountain summit located near the head of the Elwha Valley, deep within Olympic National Park in Jefferson County of Washington state. Part of the Olympic Mountains, Wilder represents the southernmost peak of the Bailey Range. It is situated 8.7 miles east-southeast of Mount Olympus, and is set within the Daniel J. Evans Wilderness. Neighbors include line parent Mount Dana, 2.3 miles (3.7 km) to the northeast, and Mount Seattle rises 3.7 miles to the southwest. The headwaters of the Goldie River form on the south slope of the mountain, and precipitation runoff from the mountain drains into Goldie River and other tributaries of the Elwha River. Topographic relief is significant as the south aspect of the peak rises nearly 3,800 feet (1,160 m) in less than two miles.

== History ==
This mountain was originally christened "Mt. Barnes" by the 1889–90 Seattle Press Expedition, for Charles Adams Barnes, the expedition's topographer. In December 1889, he and James Halbold Christie, the leader of the expedition, climbed through deep snow to the ridge just north of the peak, and finally laid eyes on the interior of the range which had been a mystery. Barnes wrote of the spectacle: "Range after range of peaks, snow-clad from base to summit, extended as far as the eye could reach, in splendid confusion."

The Mount Barnes of today, which was originally named "Mt. Childs" by that expedition, is situated three miles northwest of Mt. Wilder, and for whom Mt. Wilder is named is unknown.

== Climate ==
Based on the Köppen climate classification, Mount Wilder is located in the marine west coast climate zone of western North America. Weather fronts originating in the Pacific Ocean travel northeast toward the Olympic Mountains. As fronts approach, they are forced upward by the peaks (orographic lift), causing them to drop their moisture in the form of rain or snow. As a result, the Olympics experience high precipitation, especially during the winter months in the form of snowfall. Because of maritime influence, snow tends to be wet and heavy, resulting in avalanche danger. During winter months weather is usually cloudy, but due to high pressure systems over the Pacific Ocean that intensify during summer months, there is often little or no cloud cover during the summer. The months of July through September offer the most favorable weather for climbing. The months June through August offer the most favorable weather for viewing or climbing this mountain.

== Geology ==
The Olympic Mountains are composed of obducted clastic wedge material and oceanic crust, primarily Eocene sandstone, turbidite, and basaltic oceanic crust. The mountains were sculpted during the Pleistocene era by erosion and glaciers advancing and retreating multiple times.

== See also ==
- Olympic Mountains
- Geology of the Pacific Northwest
