= Mount Fitzhenry =

Mountain in Washington (state), United States

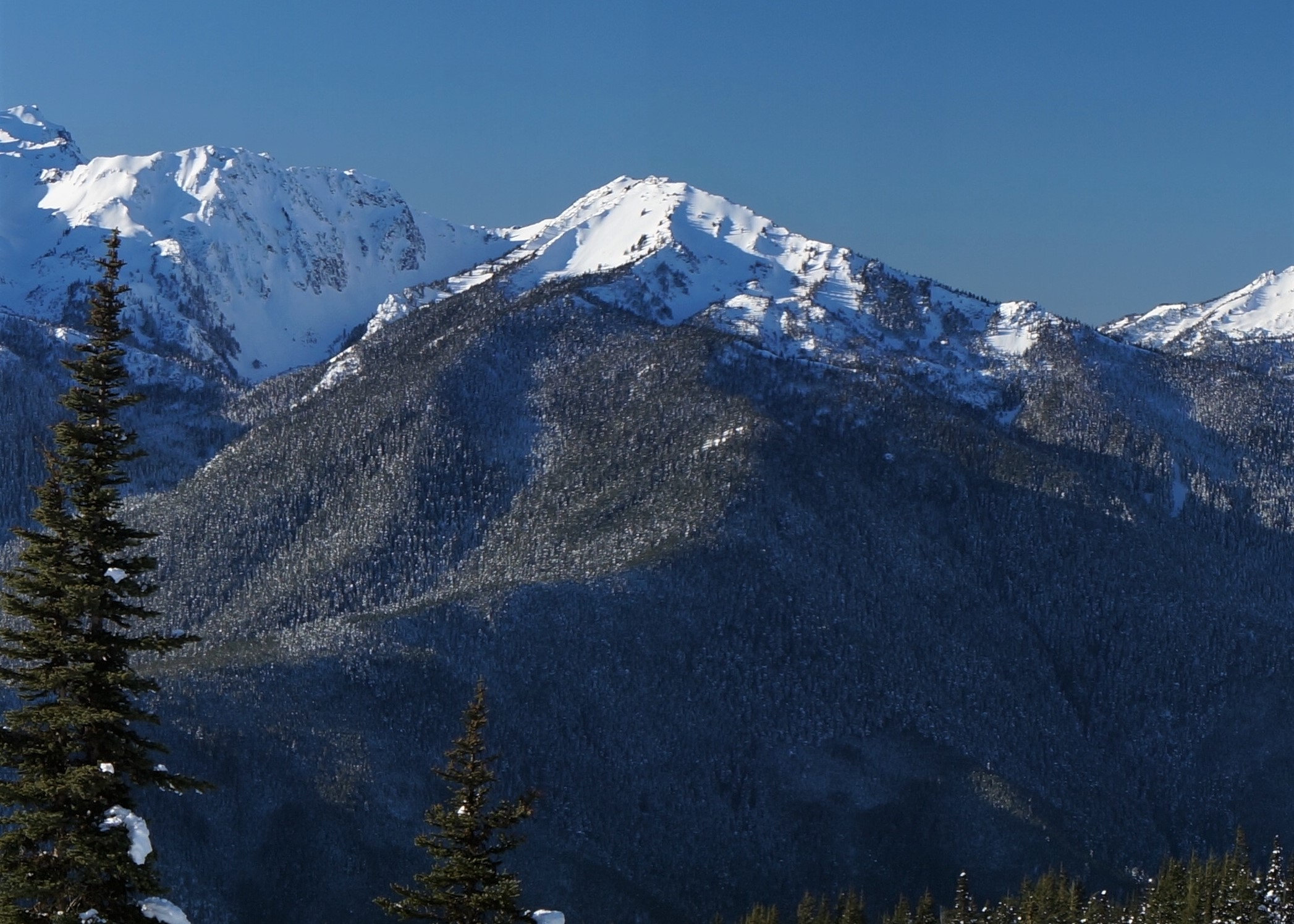
- Mount Fitzhenry from Hurricane Ridge

Highest point
- Elevation: 6,050 ft (1,840 m)
- Prominence: 450 ft (140 m)
- Parent peak: Mount Fairchild (6,925 ft)
- Isolation: 1.57 mi (2.53 km)
- Coordinates: 47°55′22″N 123°37′50″W

Geography
- Location within Washington (state) Location within the United States
- Location: Olympic National Park; Clallam County, Washington, US
- Parent range: Olympic Mountains
- Topo map: USGS Mount Carrie

Geology
- Rock age: Eocene

Climbing
- Easiest route: class 2 hiking north ridge

Mount Fitzhenry is a 6,050-foot (1,840-metre) mountain summit located within Olympic National Park in Clallam County of Washington state. Mt. Fitzhenry is in the Bailey Range, which is a subrange of the Olympic Mountains. The mountain can be seen from the visitor center at Hurricane Ridge in clear weather. Its nearest higher neighbor is Mount Fairchild, 1.57 mi (2.53 km) to the south. Precipitation runoff from the mountain drains into tributaries of the Elwha River. Mount Fitzhenry is situated at the head of Fitzhenry Creek, and both are named for Edward Allen Fitzhenry (1868–1937), Clallam County surveyor from 1892-1900. President Woodrow Wilson appointed Fitzhenry as Washington Surveyor General in 1913, and he later served as Deputy State Land Commissioner.

== Climate ==
Based on the Köppen climate classification, Mount Fitzhenry is located in the marine west coast climate zone of western North America. Most weather fronts originate in the Pacific Ocean, and travel northeast toward the Olympic Mountains. As fronts approach, they are forced upward by the peaks of the Olympic Range, causing them to drop their moisture in the form of rain or snowfall (Orographic lift). As a result, the Olympics experience high precipitation, especially during the winter months. During winter, weather is usually cloudy, but, due to high-pressure systems over the Pacific Ocean that intensify during summer, there is often little or no cloud cover during the summer. In terms of favorable weather, the best months for viewing and climbing are July through September.

== Geology ==
The Olympic Mountains are composed of obducted clastic wedge material and oceanic crust, primarily Eocene sandstone, turbidite, and basaltic oceanic crust. The mountains were sculpted during the Pleistocene era by erosion and glaciers advancing and retreating multiple times.

== Gallery ==
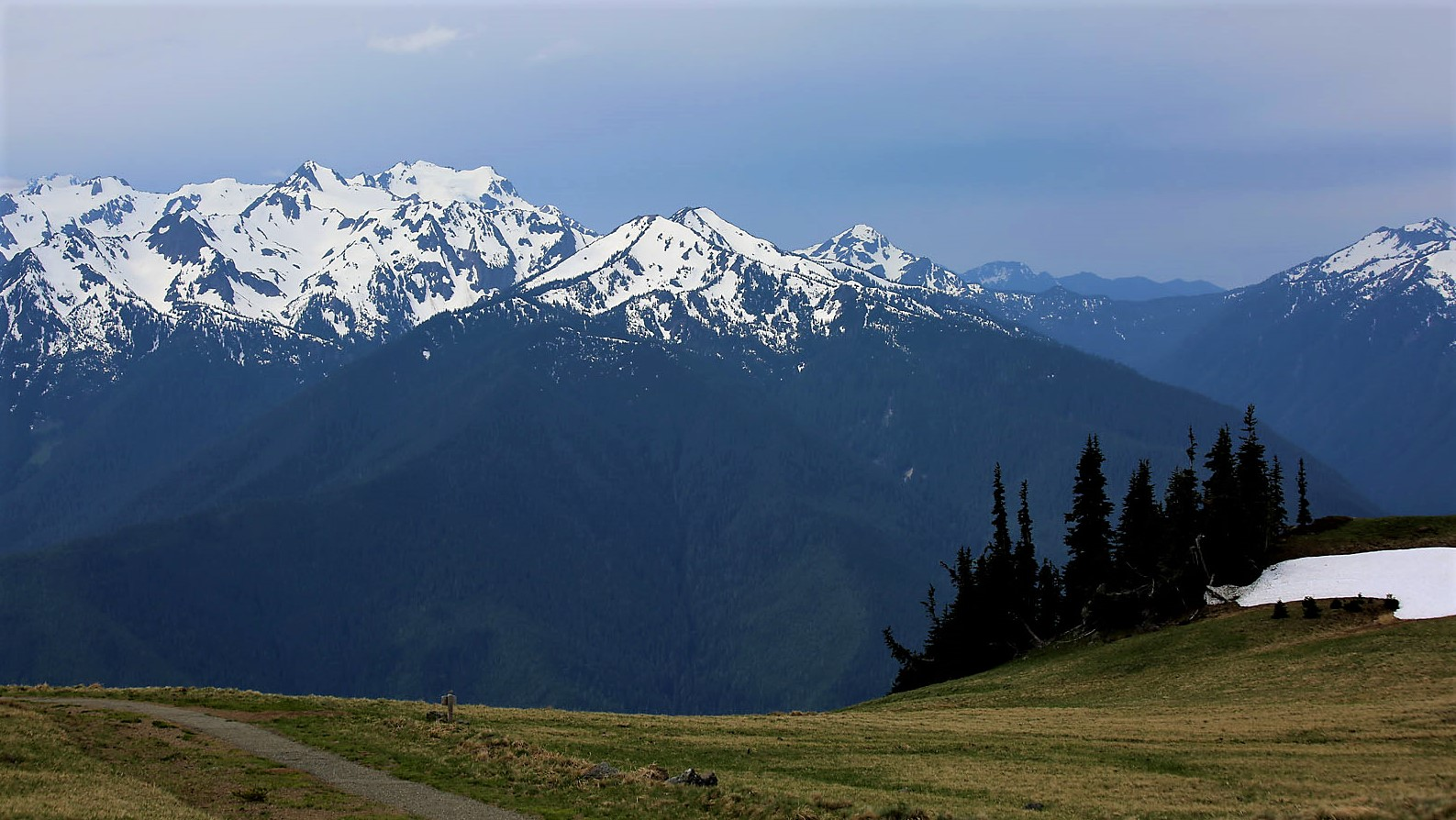
Mount Fitzhenry centered

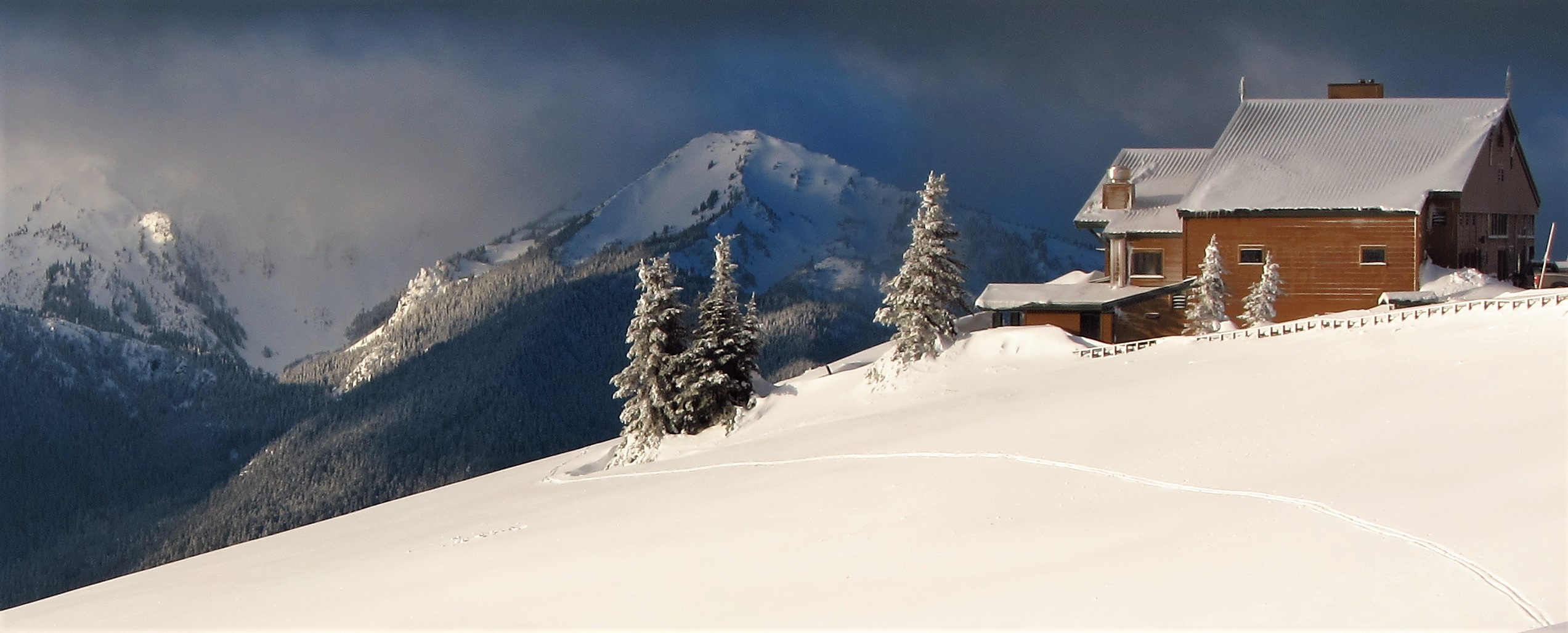
Mount Fitzhenry centered, Hurricane Ridge Visitor Center on the right

== See also ==
- Olympic Mountains
- Geology of the Pacific Northwest
