= Mount Dana (Washington) =

Mountain in Washington (state), United States

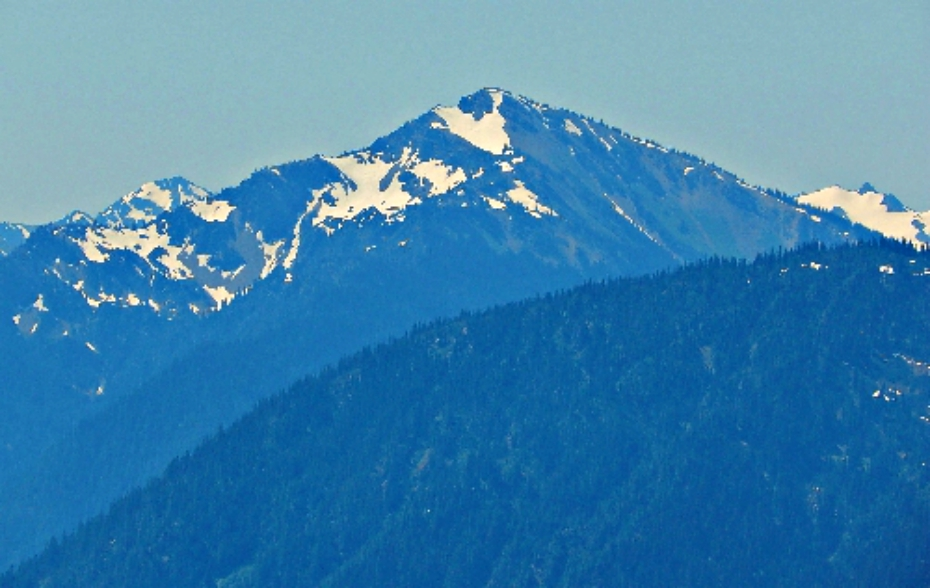
- Mount Dana seen from Hurricane Ridge

Highest point
- Elevation: 6,213 ft (1,894 m) NAVD 88
- Prominence: 1,529 ft (466 m)
- Parent peak: Mount Norton (6,397 ft)
- Isolation: 3.88 mi (6.24 km)
- Coordinates: 47°47′28″N 123°29′08″W

Geography
- Location within Washington (state) Location within the United States
- Country: United States
- State: Washington
- County: Jefferson
- Protected area: Olympic National Park
- Parent range: Olympic Mountains
- Topo map: USGS McCartney Peak

Geology
- Rock age: Eocene
- Rock type: Basalt

Climbing
- First ascent: 1928 by USGS Survey party
- Easiest route: Scrambling

Mount Dana is a 6,213 feet (1,894 m) mountain summit in Jefferson County of Washington state. Set within Olympic National Park, it is part of the Bailey Range which is a subset of the Olympic Mountains. It was named in honor of Charles Dana who was an editor of The Sun, a New York newspaper. Precipitation runoff from Mount Dana drains into the Elwha River, thence into the Strait of Juan de Fuca.

== Climate ==
Set in the north-west portion of the Olympic Mountains, Mount Dana is located in the marine west coast climate zone of western North America. Most weather fronts originate in the Pacific Ocean, and travel northeast toward the Olympic Mountains. As fronts approach, they are forced upward by the peaks of the Olympic Range, causing them to drop their moisture in the form of rain or snowfall (Orographic lift). As a result, the Olympics experience high precipitation, especially during the winter months in the form of snowfall. During winter months, weather is usually cloudy, but, due to high pressure systems over the Pacific Ocean that intensify during summer months, there is often little or no cloud cover during the summer. Because of maritime influence, snow tends to be wet and heavy, resulting in high avalanche danger.

== Gallery ==
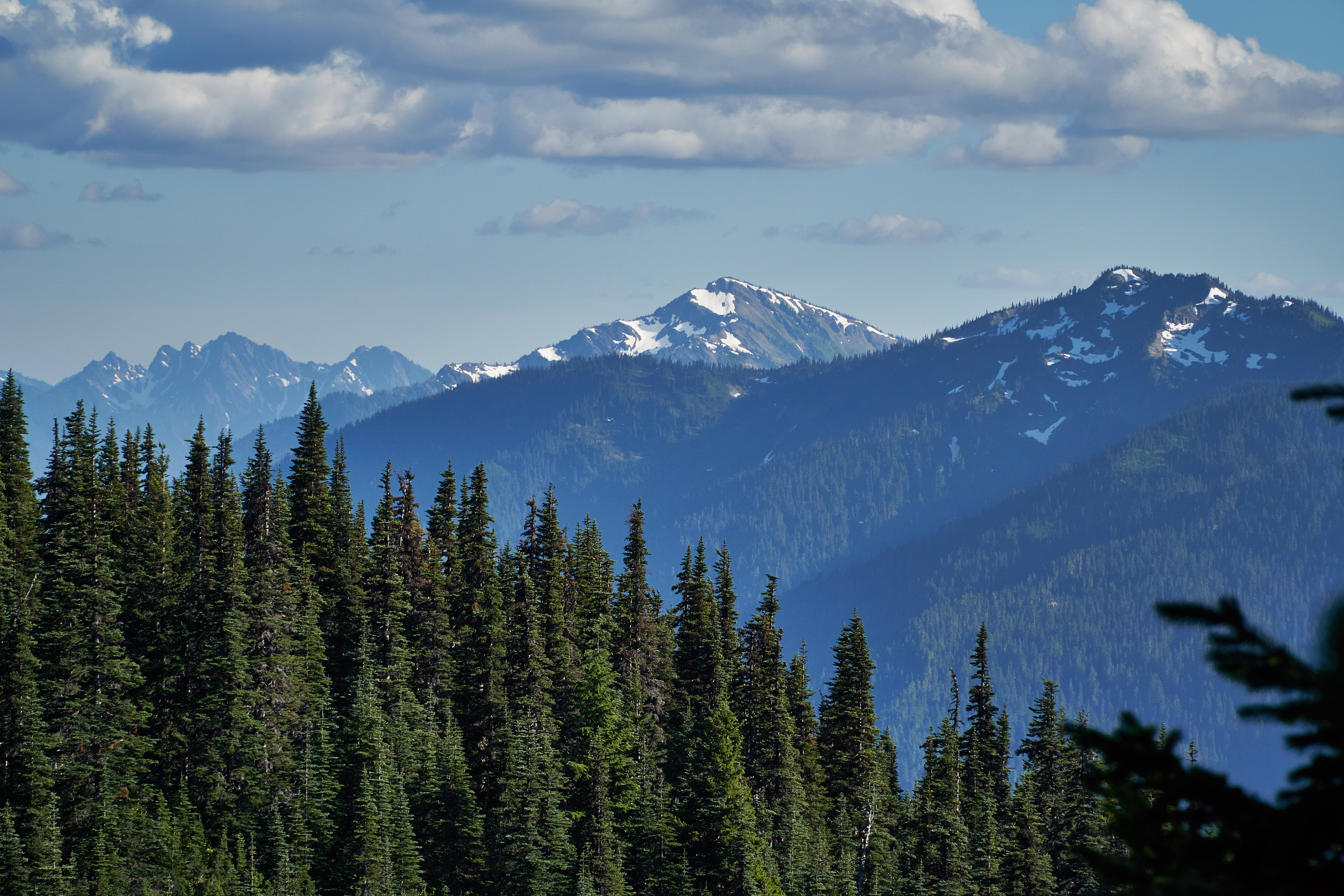
Mount Dana centered in the distance

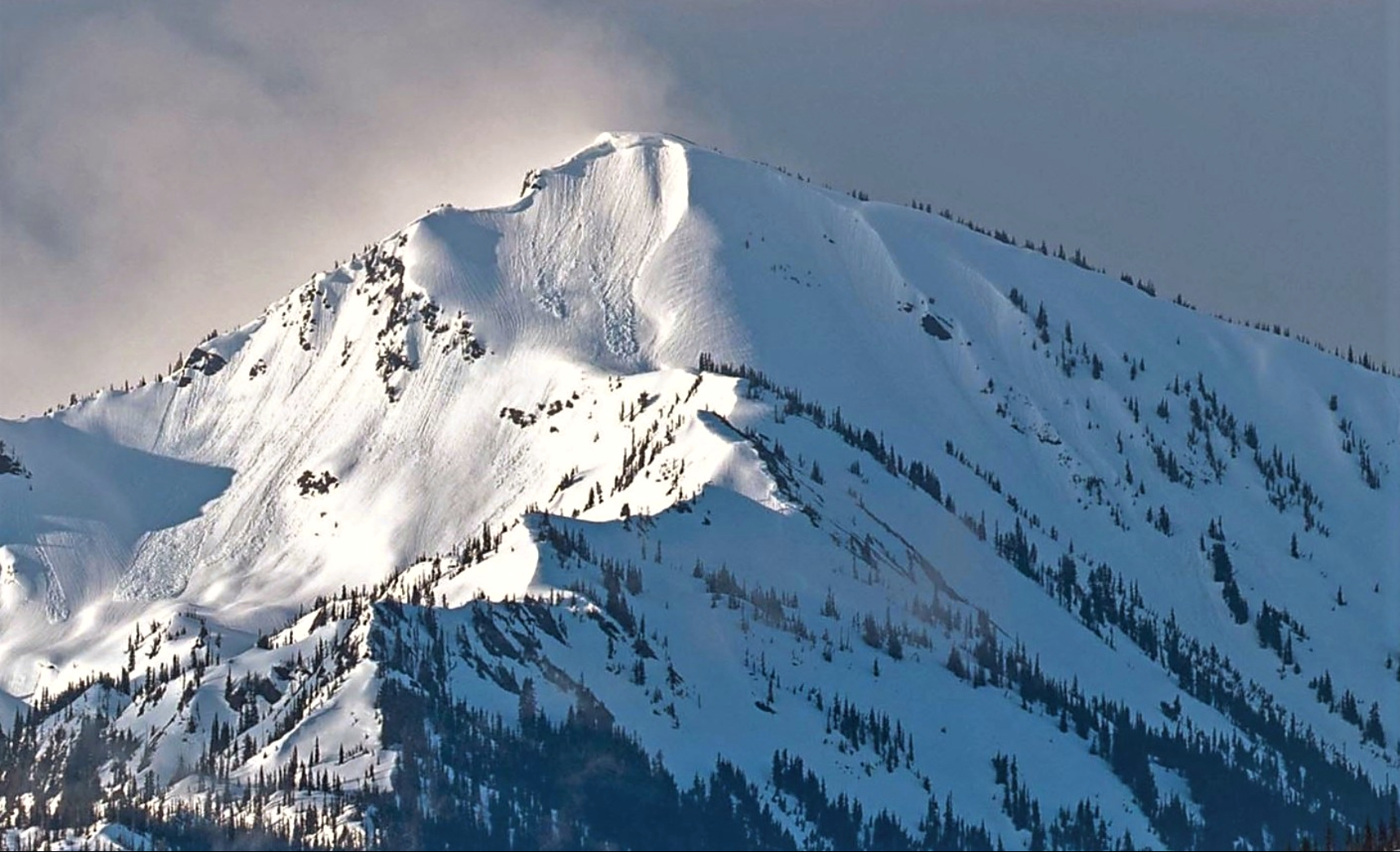
Mt. Dana

== See also ==
- Geology of the Pacific Northwest
