= Mount Norton =

Mountain in Washington (state), United States

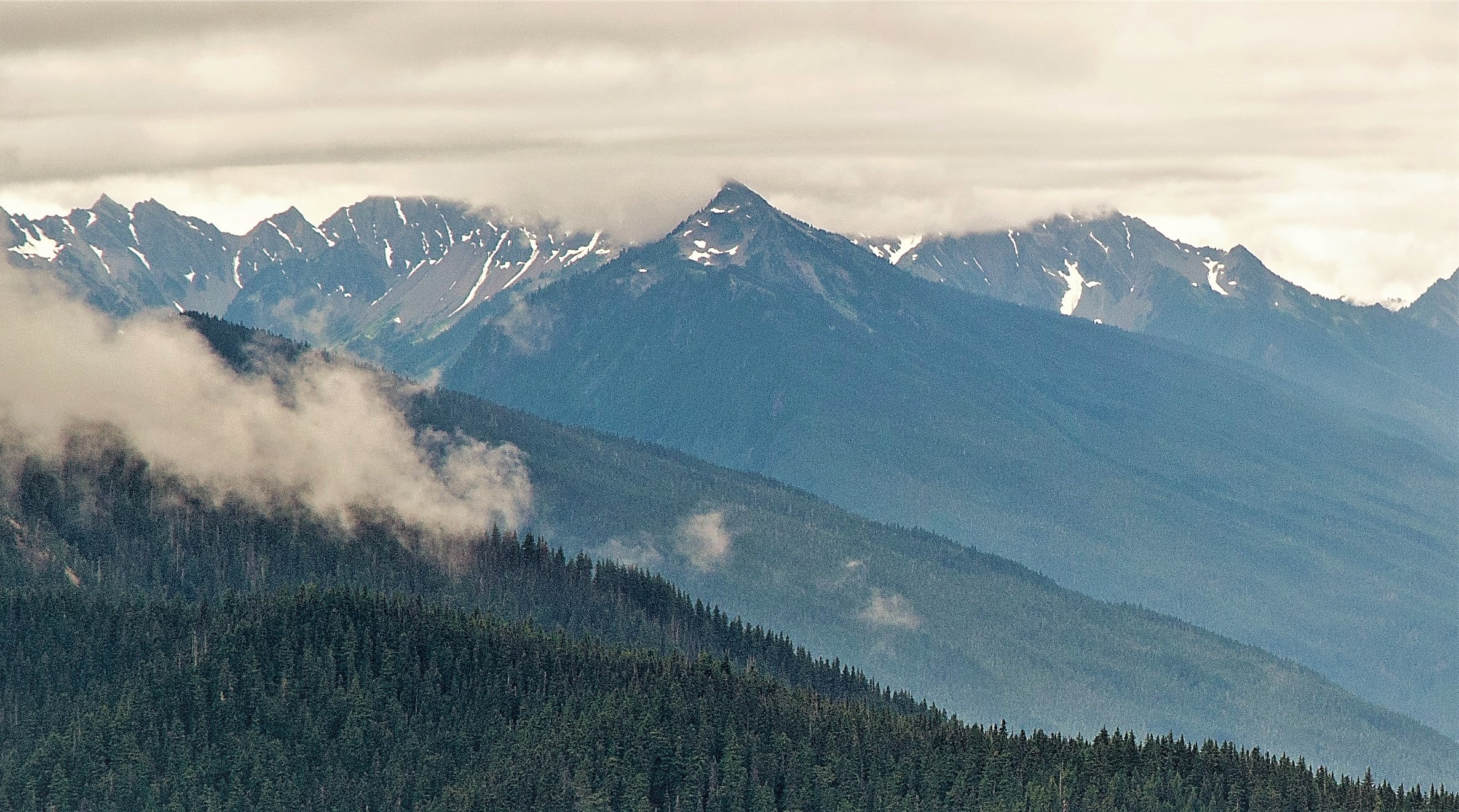
- North aspect centered, from Hurricane Ridge.

Highest point
- Elevation: 6,397 ft (1,950 m)
- Prominence: 599 ft (183 m)
- Parent peak: Crystal Peak (6,896 ft)
- Isolation: 3.11 mi (5.01 km)
- Coordinates: 47°45′45″N 123°24′50″W

Geography
- Location within Washington (state) Location within the United States
- Country: United States
- State: Washington
- County: Jefferson
- Protected area: Olympic National Park
- Parent range: Olympic Mountains
- Topo map: USGS McCartney Peak

Geology
- Rock age: Eocene

Climbing
- First ascent: 1947
- Easiest route: class 2 via Elwha River Trail

Mount Norton is a 6,397-foot-elevation (1,950-meter) mountain summit located in the Olympic Mountains in Jefferson County of Washington state. It is situated within Olympic National Park, and is set within the Daniel J. Evans Wilderness. Precipitation runoff from the mountain drains north via the Elwha River and Hayes River. Topographic relief is significant as the east aspect rises 3,200 feet (980 meters) above Hayes River in less than one mile, and the west aspect rises 4,400 feet (1,300 meters) above the Elwha valley in two miles. The lower slopes of the mountain are surrounded by forests of Western Red Cedar, Sitka Spruce, Western Hemlock, Alaskan Cedar, Mountain Hemlock, and Douglas-fir.

== History ==
This landform was originally christened "Mount Egan" in 1890 by the 1889-90 Seattle Press Expedition, for John G. Egan (1857–1913), the editor of the Seattle Press newspaper which sponsored the expedition. The mountain's present name is attributable to G.A. Whitehead of the U.S. Forest Service when he renamed the peak in 1925 for his friend and hunting partner, Ernest Norton. The mountain's toponym has been officially adopted by the United States Board on Geographic Names. Whitehead also named Mount Mystery and Mount Deception.

The first ascent of the summit was made in 1947 by Pat Cummins.

== Climate ==
Based on the Köppen climate classification, Mount Norton is located in the marine west coast climate zone of western North America. Weather fronts originating in the Pacific Ocean travel northeast toward the Olympic Mountains. As fronts approach, they are forced upward by the peaks (orographic lift), causing them to drop their moisture in the form of rain or snow. As a result, the Olympics experience high precipitation, especially during the winter months in the form of snowfall. Because of maritime influence, snow tends to be wet and heavy, resulting in avalanche danger. During winter months weather is usually cloudy, but due to high pressure systems over the Pacific Ocean that intensify during summer months, there is often little or no cloud cover during the summer. The months June through August offer the most favorable weather for viewing or climbing this peak.

== See also ==
- Olympic Mountains
- Geology of the Pacific Northwest
