= Mount Pulitzer (Washington) =

Mountain in Washington (state), United States

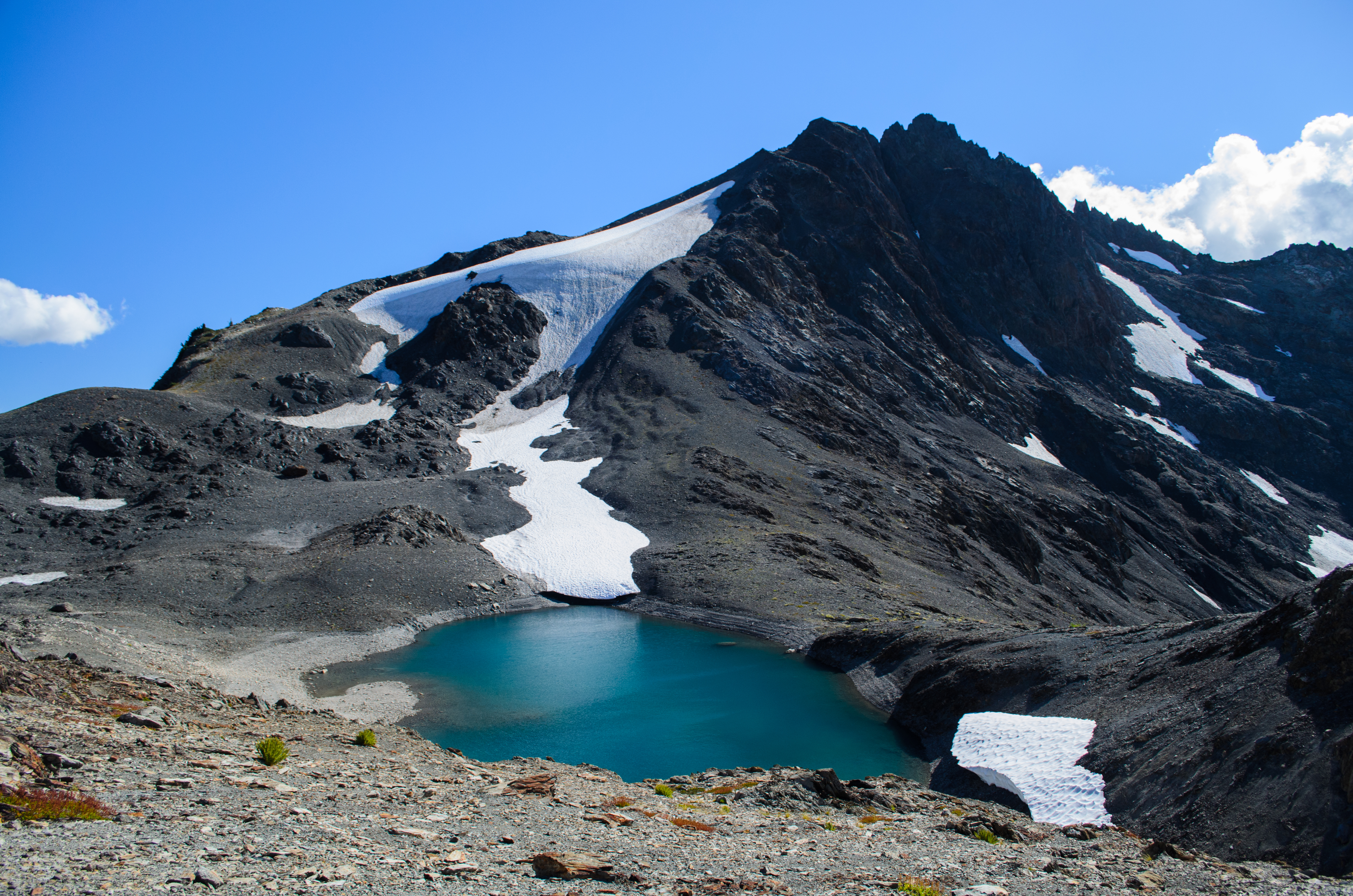
- Mount Pulitzer, northeast aspect

Highest point
- Elevation: 6,283 ft (1,915 m)
- Prominence: 923 ft (281 m)
- Parent peak: Stephen Peak (6,418 ft)
- Isolation: 2.58 mi (4.15 km)
- Coordinates: 47°50′08″N 123°34′27″W

Geography
- Location within Washington (state) Location within the United States
- Country: United States
- State: Washington
- County: Jefferson
- Protected area: Olympic National Park
- Parent range: Olympic Mountains
- Topo map: USGS Mount Queets

Geology
- Rock age: Eocene

Climbing
- First ascent: 1961
- Easiest route: class 3 scrambling East ridge

Mount Pulitzer, also known as Snagtooth, is a 6,283-foot (1,915-metre) mountain summit located within Olympic National Park in Jefferson County of Washington state. Mount Pulitzer is the sixth-highest peak in the Bailey Range, which is a subrange of the Olympic Mountains. Its nearest neighbor is Mount Ferry, 0.58 mi (0.93 km) to the northeast, and its nearest higher neighbor is Stephen Peak, 2.58 mi (4.15 km) to the north. Mount Olympus is set 6.8 mi (10.9 km) to the southwest. In clear weather, the mountain can be seen from the visitor center at Hurricane Ridge. Precipitation runoff from the mountain drains into tributaries of the Elwha and Hoh Rivers. The first ascent of the summit was made in 1961 by Doug Waali, Bob Wood, and Kent Heathershaw via the east ridge.

== Etymology ==
This peak was named by the 1889-90 Seattle Press Expedition after Joseph Pulitzer (1847–1911), newspaper publisher of the New York World, his name is now best known for the Pulitzer Prize. The mountain was originally called Mt. Ferry before it was renamed.

== Climate ==
Based on the Köppen climate classification, Mount Pulitzer is located in the marine west coast climate zone of western North America. This climate supports a small un-named glacier on the north slope. Weather fronts originating in the Pacific Ocean travel northeast toward the Olympic Mountains. As fronts approach, they are forced upward by the peaks (orographic lift), causing them to drop their moisture in the form of rain or snow. As a result, the Olympics experience high precipitation, especially during the winter months in the form of snowfall. Because of maritime influence, snow tends to be wet and heavy, resulting in avalanche danger. During winter months weather is usually cloudy, but due to high pressure systems over the Pacific Ocean that intensify during summer months, there is often little or no cloud cover during the summer. The months of July through September offer the most favorable weather for viewing and climbing.

== Geology ==
The Olympic Mountains are composed of obducted clastic wedge material and oceanic crust, primarily Eocene sandstone, turbidite, and basaltic oceanic crust. The mountains were sculpted during the Pleistocene era by erosion and glaciers advancing and retreating multiple times.

== Gallery ==
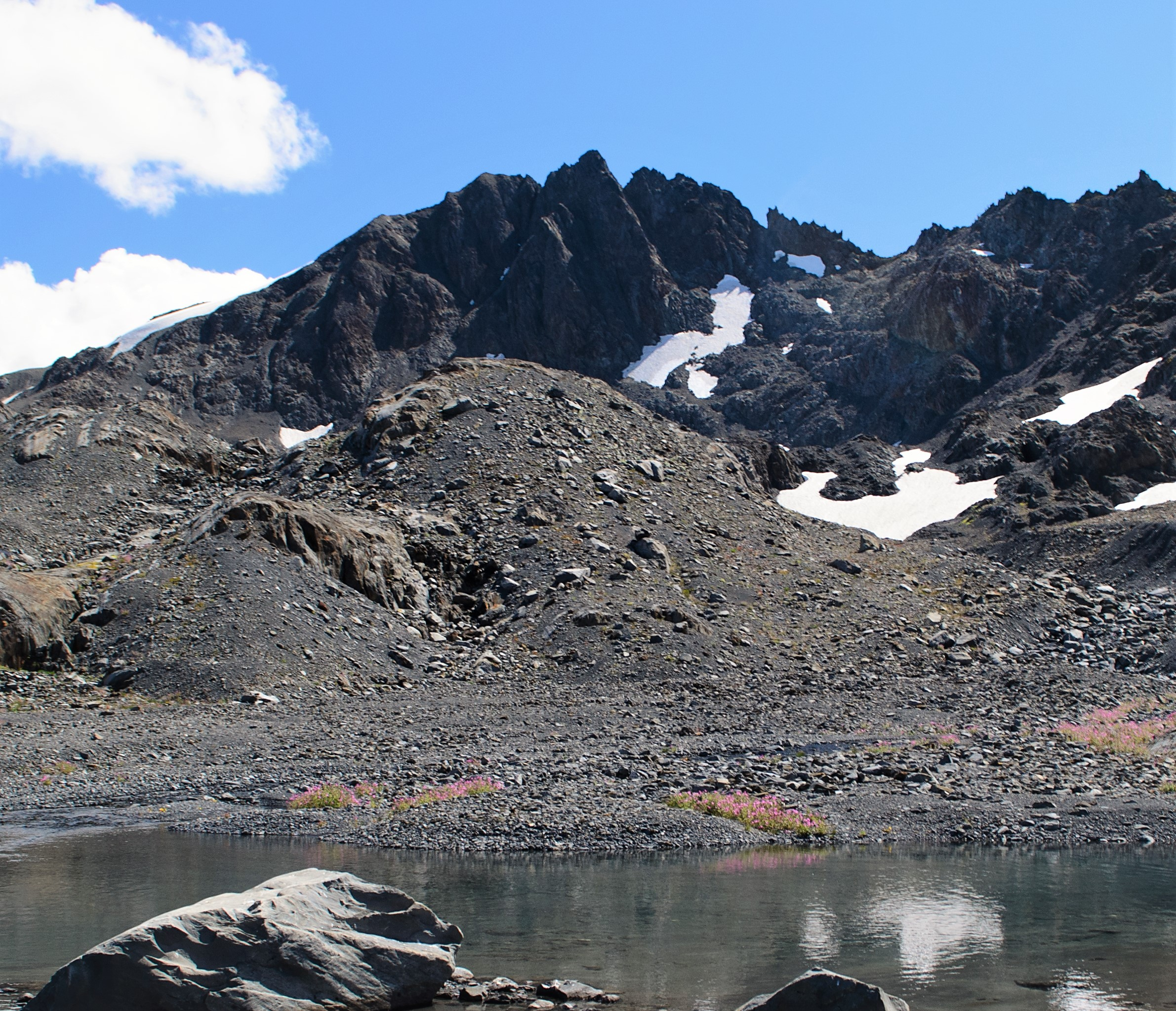
Mt. Pulitzer, north aspect

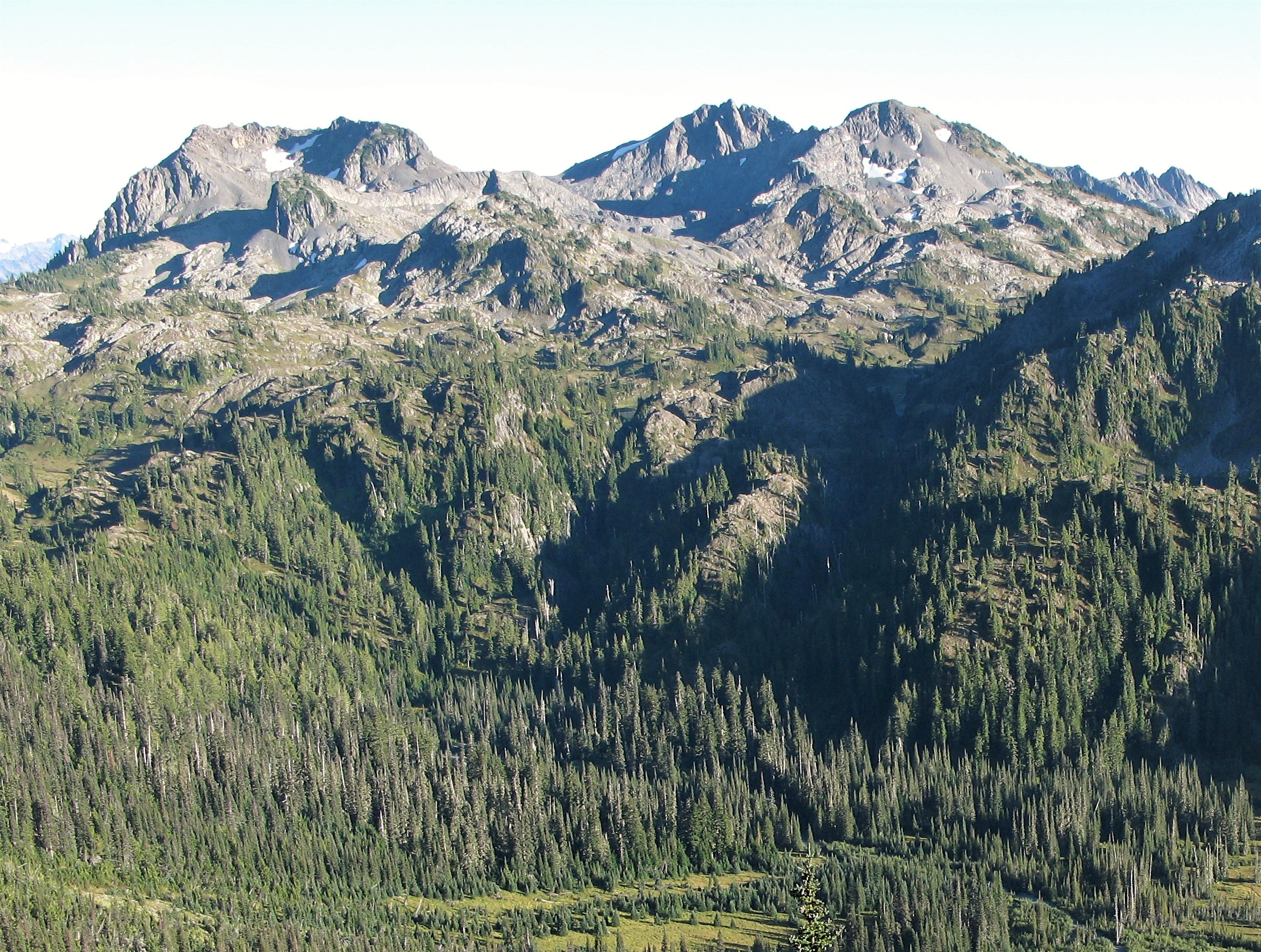
Mt. Ferry (left) and Mt. Pulitzer (right of center)

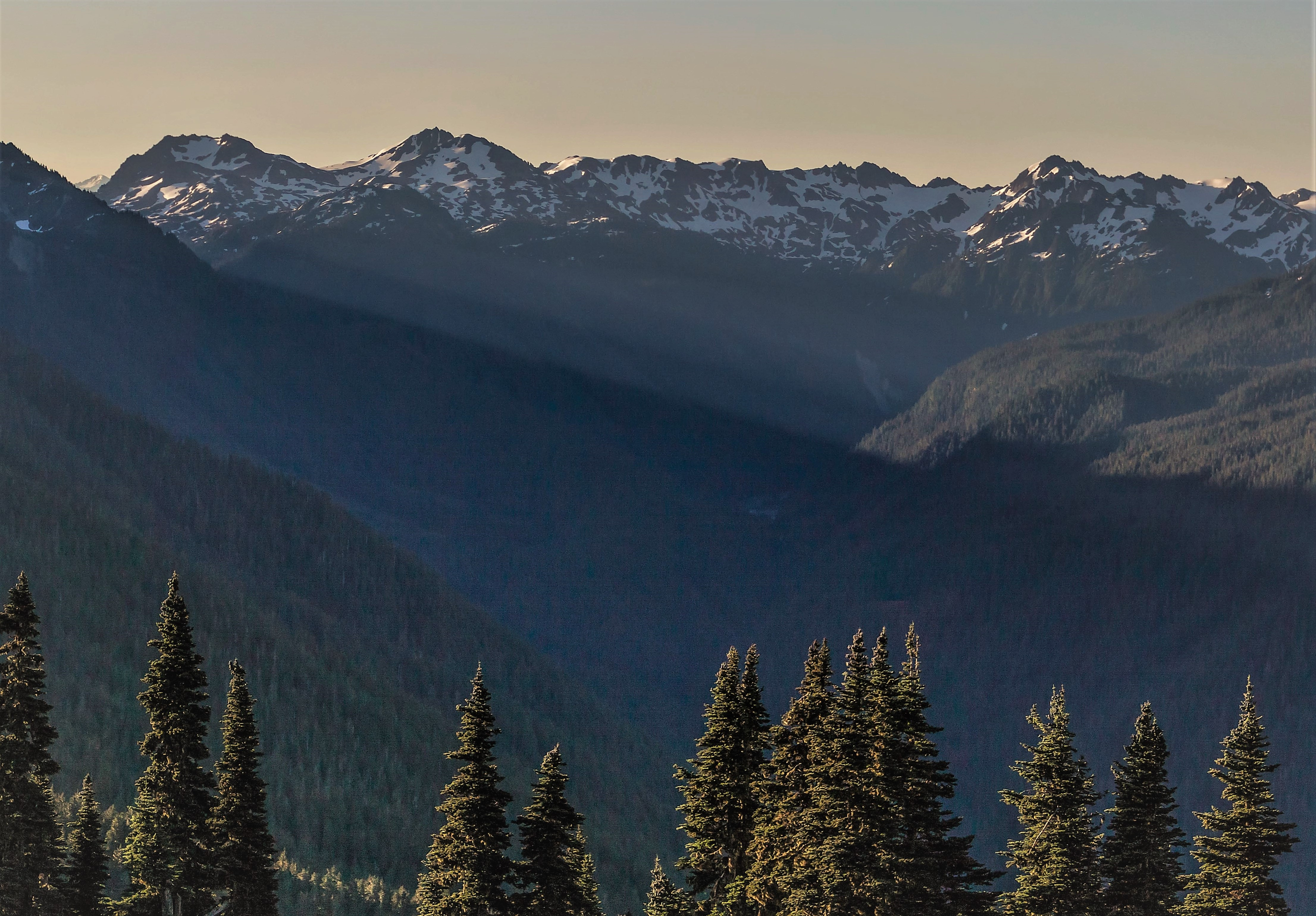
The Bailey Range seen from High Divide featuring Mt. Ferry and Mt. Pulitzer to left, and Mt. Childs on the right.

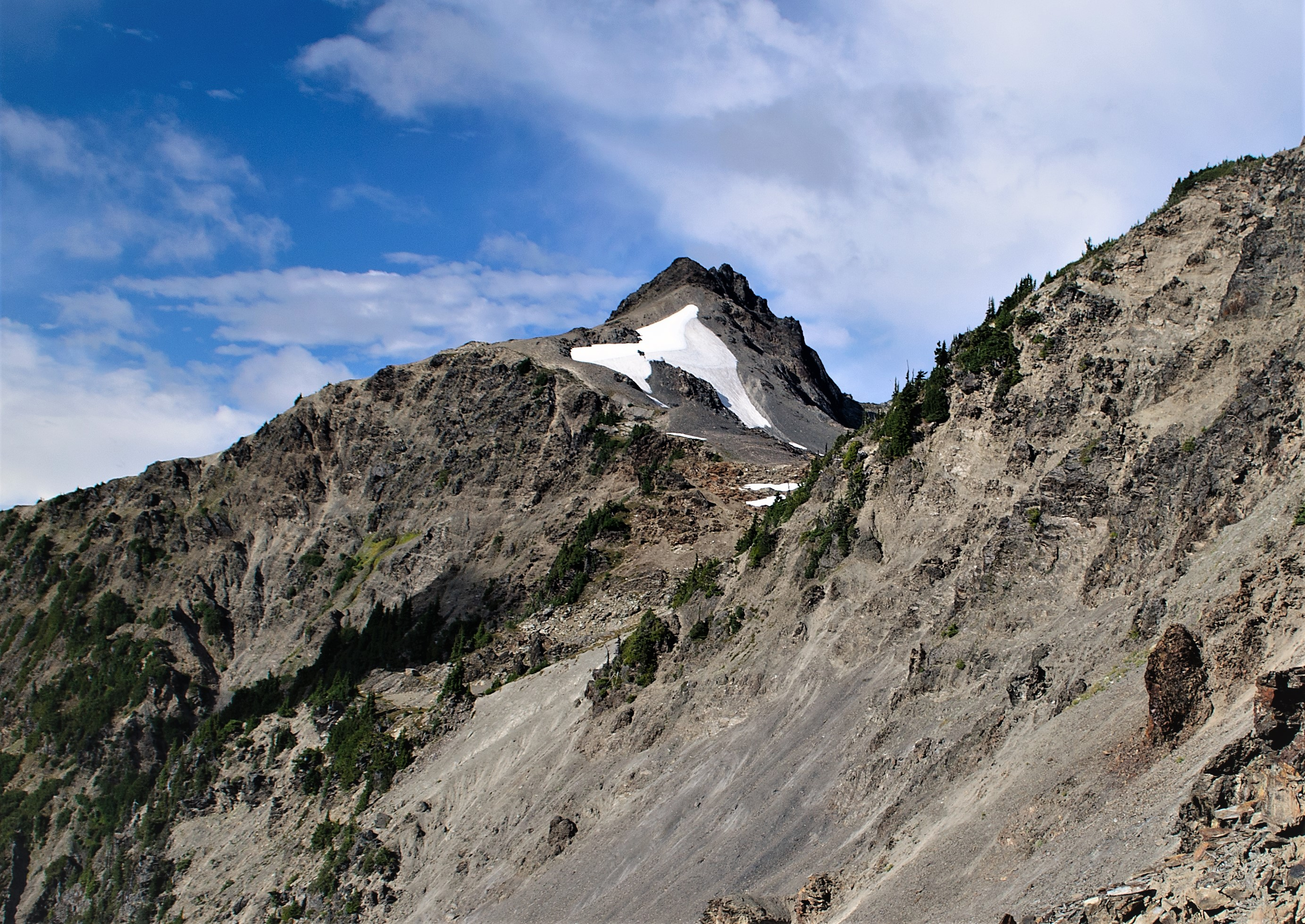
Mount Pulitzer from northeast

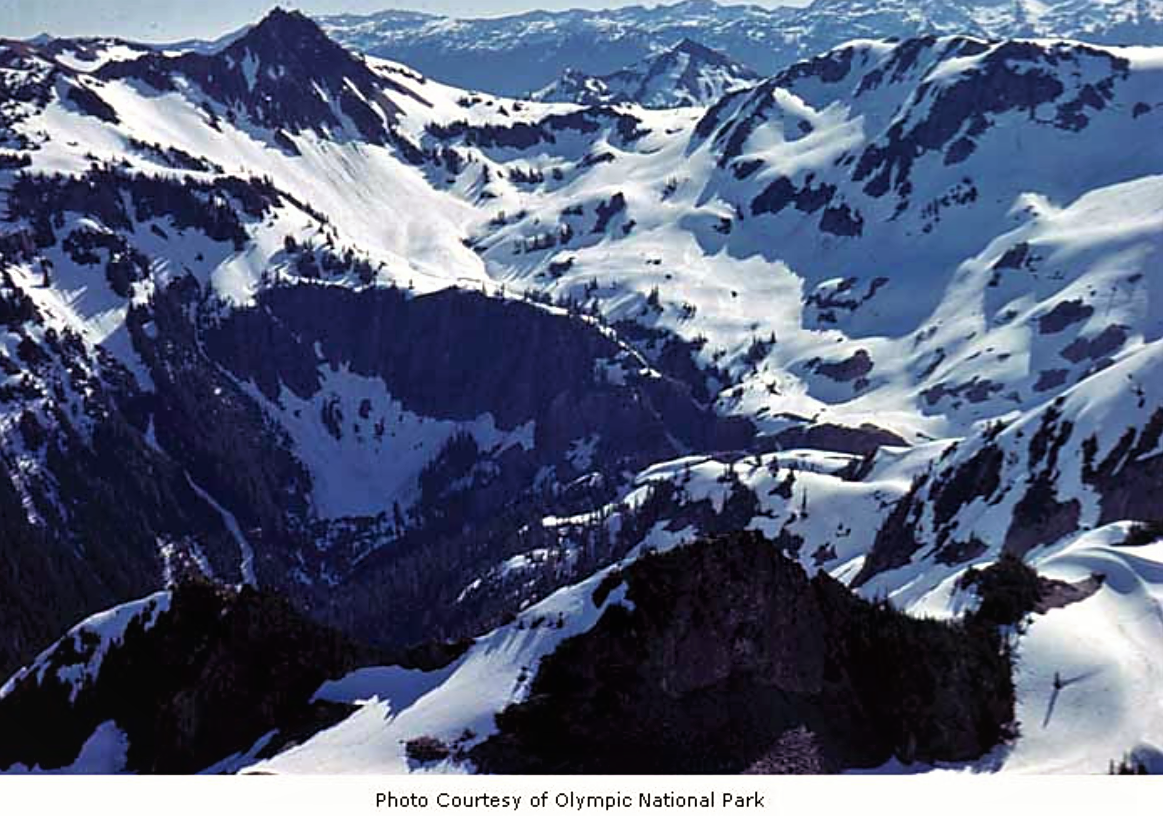
Mt. Pulitzer in upper left

== See also ==
- Olympic Mountains
- Geology of the Pacific Northwest
