= Mount Ferry =

Mountain in Washington (state), United States

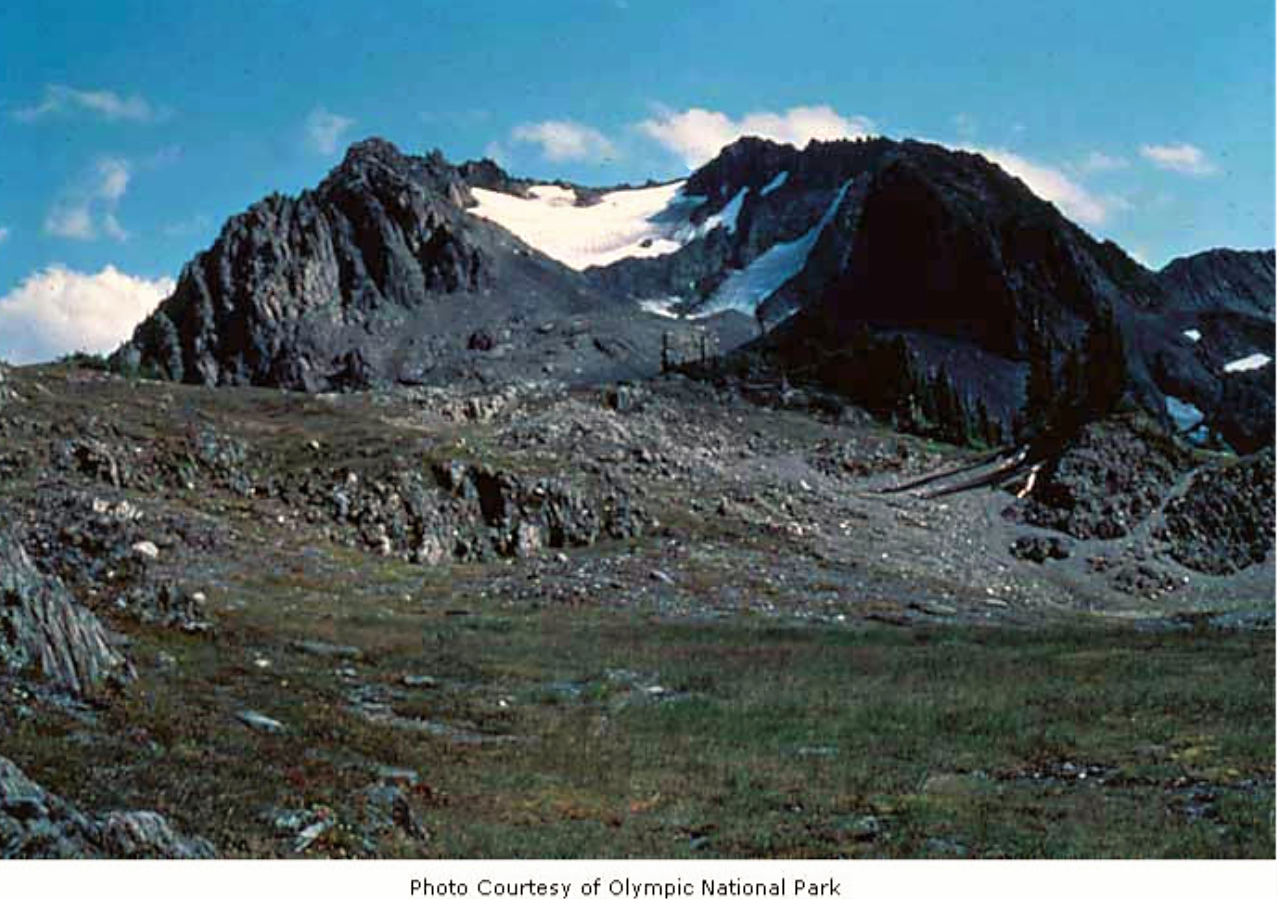
- North aspect

Highest point
- Elevation: 6,195 ft (1,888 m)
- Prominence: 395 ft (120 m)
- Parent peak: Mount Pulitzer (6,283 ft)
- Isolation: 0.58 mi (0.93 km)
- Coordinates: 47°50′34″N 123°34′06″W

Geography
- Location within Washington (state) Location within the United States
- Country: United States
- State: Washington
- County: Jefferson
- Protected area: Olympic National Park
- Parent range: Olympic Mountains
- Topo map: USGS Mount Queets

Geology
- Rock age: Eocene

Climbing
- Easiest route: class 2 hiking

Mount Ferry is a 6,195-foot (1,888-metre) mountain summit located within Olympic National Park in Jefferson County of Washington state. Mount Ferry is the eighth-highest peak in the Bailey Range, which is a subrange of the Olympic Mountains. In clear weather, the mountain can be seen from the visitor center at Hurricane Ridge. Its nearest higher neighbor is Mount Pulitzer, 0.6 mi (0.97 km) to the southwest. Stephen Peak is set 2.26 mi (3.64 km) to the northwest, and Mount Olympus is 7.2 mi (11.6 km) to the southwest. Precipitation runoff from the mountain drains into tributaries of the Elwha and Hoh Rivers.

== Etymology ==
This peak was named by the 1889-90 Seattle Press Expedition after Elisha P. Ferry (1825–1895), the first Governor of Washington. It was at Ferry's urging that the Seattle Press newspaper sponsored the expedition to make the first crossing of the Olympic Mountains. The mountain's name was originally affixed to the 6,283-ft peak (Mt. Pulitzer) to the southwest before it was moved to its present position.

== Climate ==
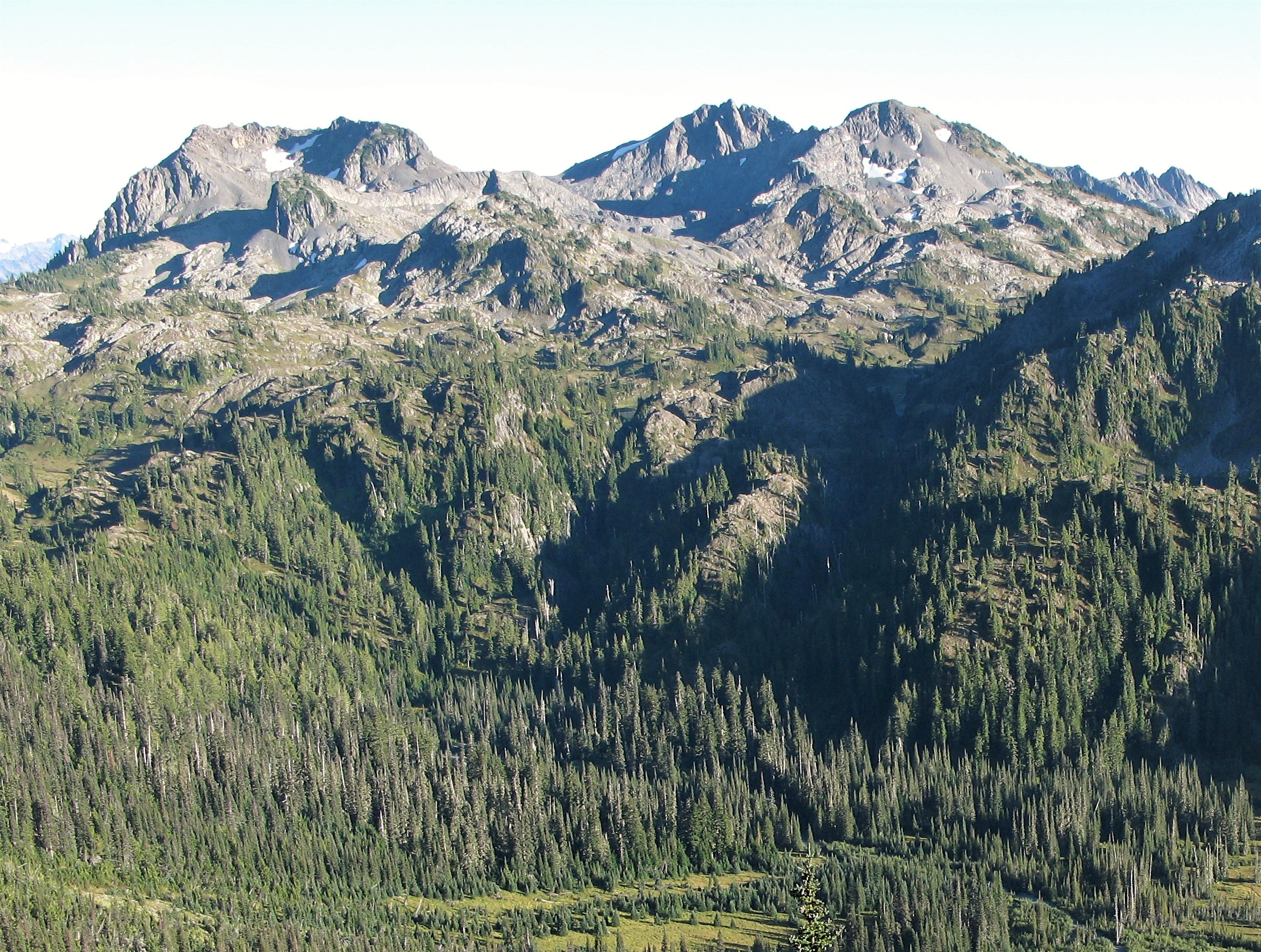
Mts. Ferry (left) and Pulitzer

Based on the Köppen climate classification, Mount Ferry is located in the marine west coast climate zone of western North America. Weather fronts originating in the Pacific Ocean travel northeast toward the Olympic Mountains. As fronts approach, they are forced upward by the peaks (orographic lift), causing them to drop their moisture in the form of rain or snow. As a result, the Olympics experience high precipitation, especially during the winter months in the form of snowfall. Because of maritime influence, snow tends to be wet and heavy, resulting in avalanche danger. During winter months weather is usually cloudy, but due to high pressure systems over the Pacific Ocean that intensify during summer months, there is often little or no cloud cover during the summer. The months July through September offer the most favorable weather for viewing and climbing.

== Geology ==
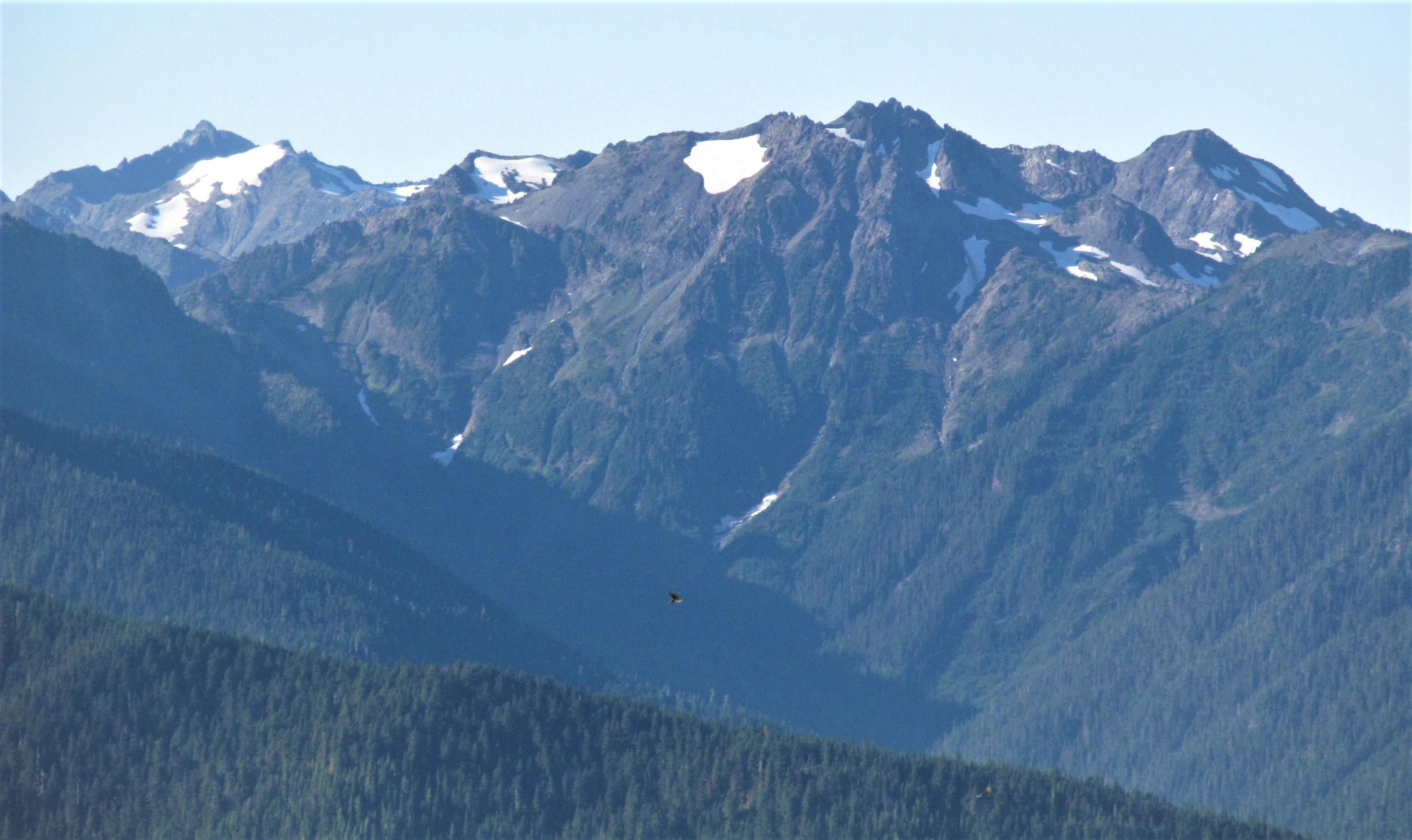
Mount Ferry from Hurricane Ridge. Mt. Pulitzer behind right, Meany and Queets to left

The Olympic Mountains are composed of obducted clastic wedge material and oceanic crust, primarily Eocene sandstone, turbidite, and basaltic oceanic crust. The mountains were sculpted during the Pleistocene era by erosion and glaciers advancing and retreating multiple times.

== See also ==
- Olympic Mountains
- Geology of the Pacific Northwest
