= Eagle Point (Olympic Mountains) =

Mountain in Washington (state), United States

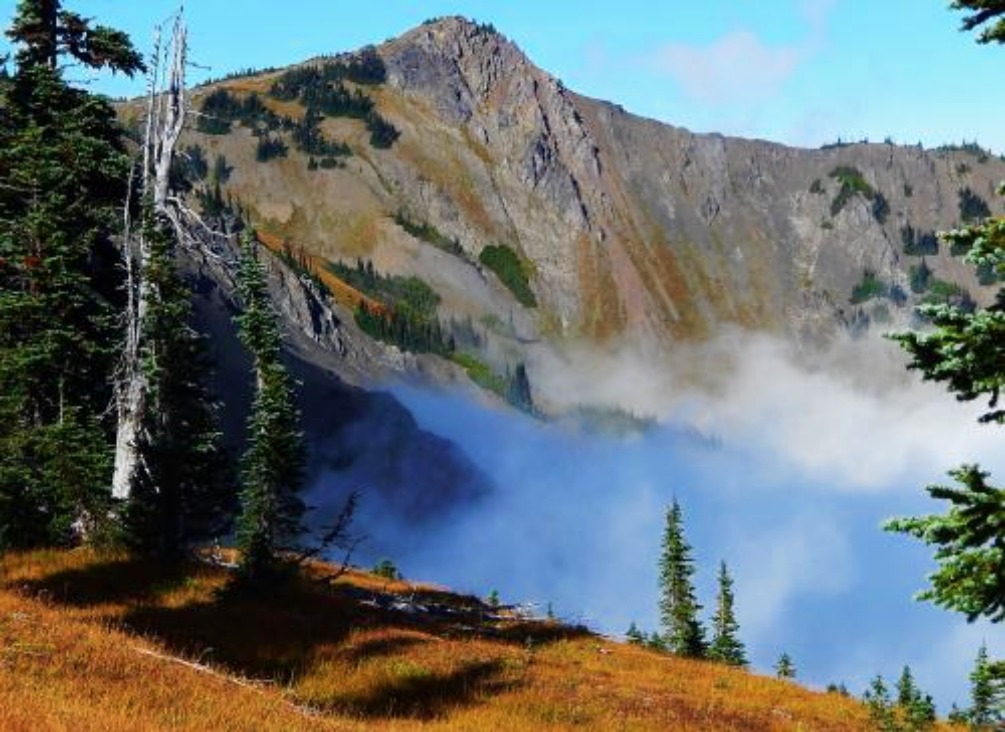
- Eagle Point seen from the south

Highest point
- Elevation: 6,247 ft (1,904 m)
- Prominence: 161 ft (49 m)
- Parent peak: Elk Mountain (6,773 ft)
- Isolation: 2.85 mi (4.59 km)
- Coordinates: 47°56′21″N 123°24′33″W

Geography
- Location within Washington (state) Location within the United States
- Country: United States
- State: Washington
- County: Clallam
- Protected area: Olympic National Park
- Parent range: Olympic Mountains
- Topo map: USGS Mount Angeles

Geology
- Rock age: Eocene

Climbing
- Easiest route: Hiking class 2

Eagle Point is a 6,247-foot-elevation (1,904-meter) summit in the Olympic Mountains and is located in Clallam County of Washington state. It is set on Hurricane Ridge within Olympic National Park. It is situated midway between Steeple Rock and Obstruction Peak, 1.42 mi (2.29 km) to the southeast. Precipitation runoff drains into tributaries of the Elwha River and Morse Creek, thence the Strait of Juan de Fuca.

== Climate ==
Set in the north-central portion of the Olympic Mountains, Eagle Point is located in the marine west coast climate zone of western North America. Weather fronts originating in the Pacific Ocean travel northeast toward the Olympic Mountains. As fronts approach, they are forced upward by the peaks (orographic lift), causing them to drop their moisture in the form of rain or snow. As a result, the Olympics experience high precipitation, especially during the winter months in the form of snowfall. Because of maritime influence, snow tends to be wet and heavy, resulting in avalanche danger. During winter months weather is usually cloudy, but due to high pressure systems over the Pacific Ocean that intensify during summer months, there is often little or no cloud cover during the summer.

Waterhole is a weather station on the eastern slope below Eagle Point.

Climate data for Waterhole, Washington, 2003–2022 normals: 5010ft (1527m)
Month	Jan	Feb	Mar	Apr	May	Jun	Jul	Aug	Sep	Oct	Nov	Dec	Year
Mean daily maximum °F (°C)	34.8 (1.6)	33.9 (1.1)	36.4 (2.4)	41.0 (5.0)	48.6 (9.2)	54.1 (12.3)	61.8 (16.6)	62.3 (16.8)	56.0 (13.3)	45.9 (7.7)	36.3 (2.4)	31.6 (−0.2)	45.2 (7.4)
Daily mean °F (°C)	30.2 (−1.0)	28.1 (−2.2)	30.0 (−1.1)	33.5 (0.8)	40.6 (4.8)	45.9 (7.7)	52.9 (11.6)	53.5 (11.9)	48.1 (8.9)	39.9 (4.4)	31.5 (−0.3)	27.1 (−2.7)	38.4 (3.6)
Mean daily minimum °F (°C)	25.5 (−3.6)	22.4 (−5.3)	23.5 (−4.7)	26.0 (−3.3)	32.6 (0.3)	37.7 (3.2)	43.9 (6.6)	44.7 (7.1)	40.1 (4.5)	33.8 (1.0)	26.7 (−2.9)	22.7 (−5.2)	31.6 (−0.2)
Average precipitation inches (mm)	12.03 (306)	7.38 (187)	8.60 (218)	4.54 (115)	3.02 (77)	1.59 (40)	0.60 (15)	1.19 (30)	2.18 (55)	6.19 (157)	12.02 (305)	12.11 (308)	71.45 (1,813)
Source 1: XMACIS2
Source 2: NOAA (Precipitation)

== Geology ==
The Olympic Mountains are composed of obducted clastic wedge material and oceanic crust, primarily Eocene sandstone, turbidite, and basaltic oceanic crust. The mountains were sculpted during the Pleistocene era by erosion and glaciers advancing and retreating multiple times.

== See also ==
- Olympic Mountains
- Geology of the Pacific Northwest

== Gallery ==
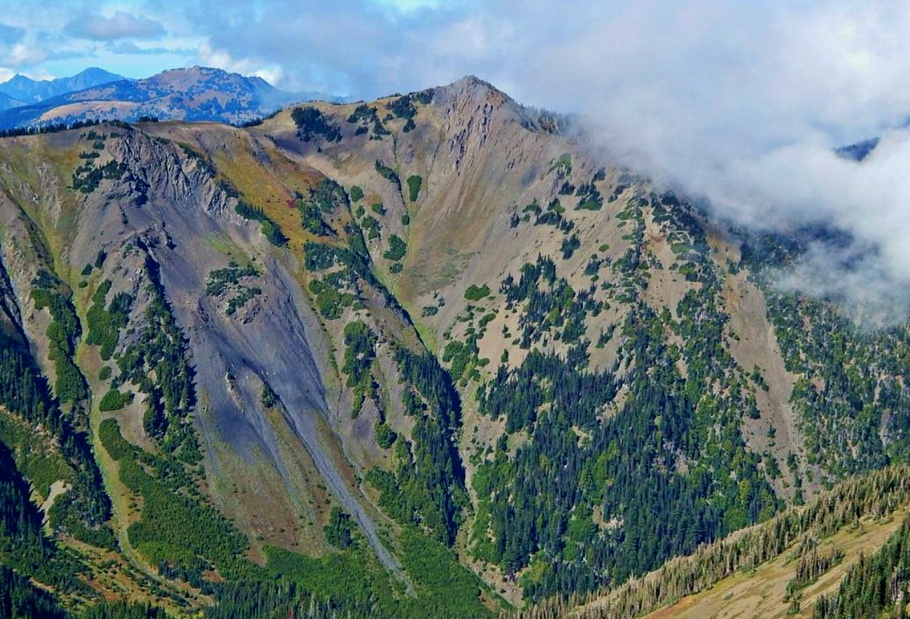
Eagle Point seen from Obstruction Peak

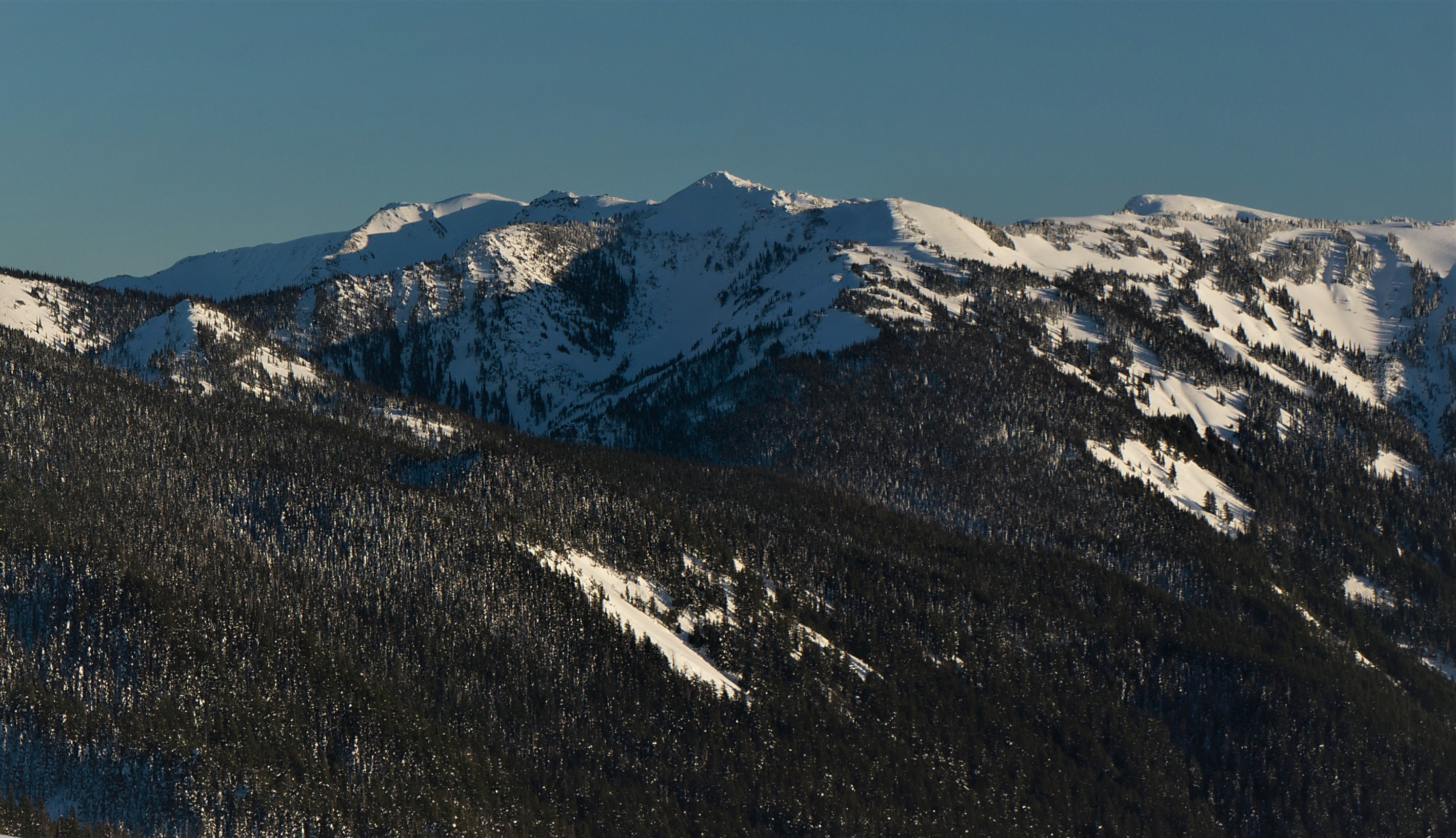
West aspect in winter, seen from the Hurricane Ridge Visitor Center area.
