= Blue Mountain (Washington) =

Mountain in Washington (state), United States

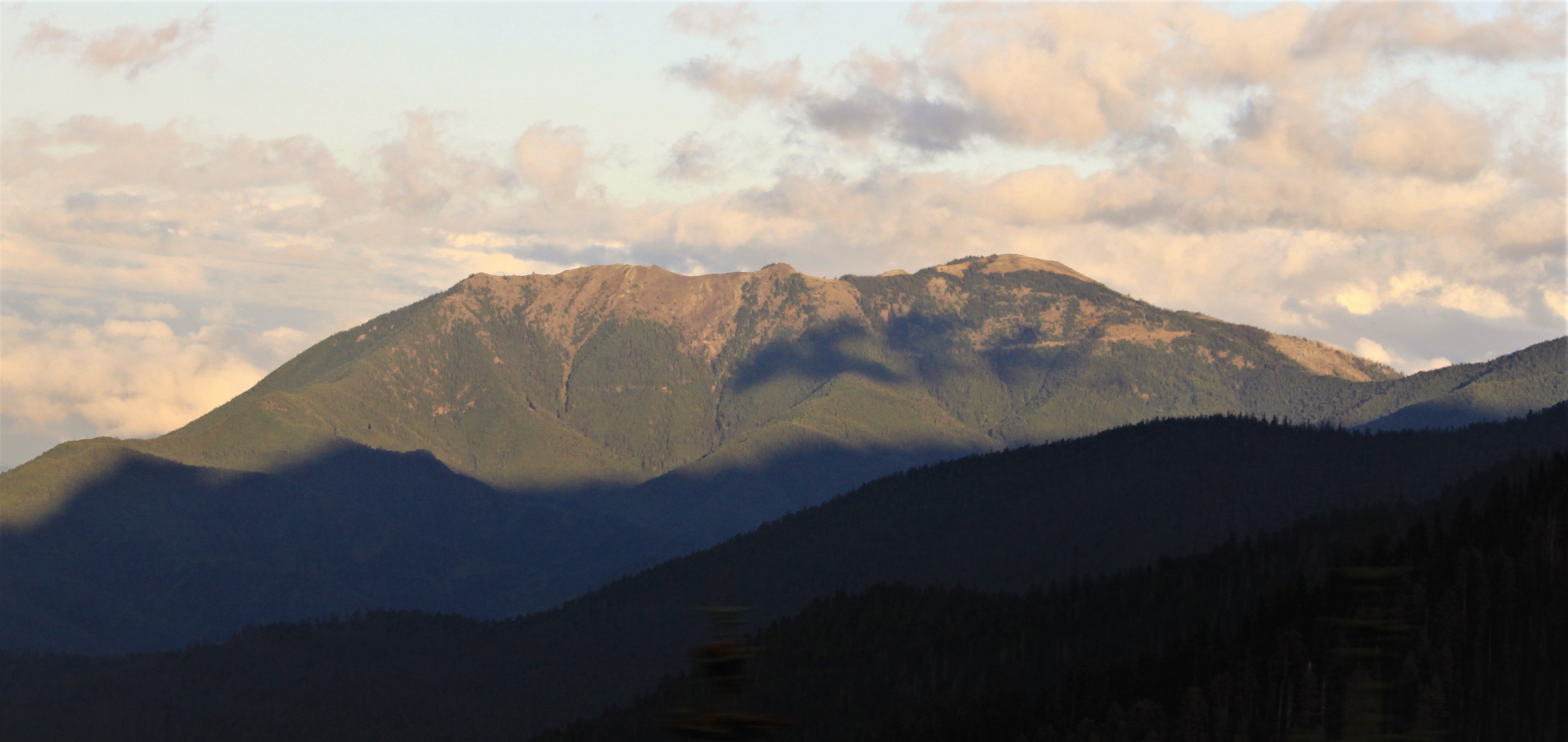
- West aspect, viewed from Hurricane Ridge Road

Highest point
- Elevation: 6,004 ft (1,830 m)
- Prominence: 1,107 ft (337 m)
- Parent peak: Maiden Peak (6,434 ft)
- Isolation: 3.14 mi (5.05 km)
- Coordinates: 47°57′16″N 123°15′34″W

Geography
- Location within Washington (state) Location within the United States
- Country: United States
- State: Washington
- County: Clallam
- Protected area: Olympic National Park
- Parent range: Olympic Mountains
- Topo map: USGS Maiden Peak

Geology
- Rock age: Eocene

Climbing
- Easiest route: class 1 walking

Blue Mountain is a 6,004-foot-elevation (1,830-meter) mountain summit located within Olympic National Park in Clallam County of Washington state. Blue Mountain is situated in the Daniel J. Evans Wilderness, 13 miles southeast of Port Angeles and 11 miles southwest of Sequim. Topographic relief is significant as the south aspect rises 4,000 feet (1,200 meters) above Gray Wolf River in approximately 2.5 miles. The mountain's name is due to a soft, blue haze that forms around the mountain in the summer. New settlers to the Olympic Peninsula near the end of the 19th century brought devastating fires started by land clearing and logging activities. The Dungeness Fire of 1891 burned about 30,000 acres, destroying much of the forest around Blue Mountain.

Access is via the 19-mile Deer Park Road, and the summit can be reached by walking the half-mile Rain Shadow Loop Trail which gains 170 feet of elevation from road's end. The trail is so named because Blue Mountain lies within the rain shadow of the Olympic Mountains, receiving 50 inches of precipitation annually compared to more than 200 inches on Mount Olympus, 23 miles distant. Precipitation runoff from the mountain drains north to the Strait of Juan de Fuca via Maiden Creek, Siebert Creek, McDonald Creek, Canyon Creek, and Gray Wolf River. The summit offers a view of the San Juan Islands, Victoria across the strait on Vancouver Island, Canada, and on a clear day the eye can see as far as Mount Baker, 87 miles away. The endemic Olympic bellflower can be found near the summit.

== Climate ==
Based on the Köppen climate classification, Blue Mountain is located in the marine west coast climate zone of western North America. Weather fronts originating in the Pacific Ocean travel northeast toward the Olympic Mountains. As fronts approach, they are forced upward by the peaks (orographic lift), causing them to drop their moisture in the form of rain or snow. As a result, the Olympics experience high precipitation, especially during the winter months in the form of snowfall. Because of maritime influence, snow tends to be wet and heavy, resulting in high avalanche danger. During winter months weather is usually cloudy, but due to high pressure systems over the Pacific Ocean that intensify during summer months, there is often little or no cloud cover during the summer.

== Geology ==
The Olympic Mountains are composed of obducted clastic wedge material and oceanic crust, primarily Eocene sandstone, turbidite, and basaltic oceanic crust. The mountains were sculpted during the Pleistocene era by erosion and glaciers advancing and retreating multiple times.

== See also ==
- Olympic Mountains
- Geology of the Pacific Northwest

== Gallery ==
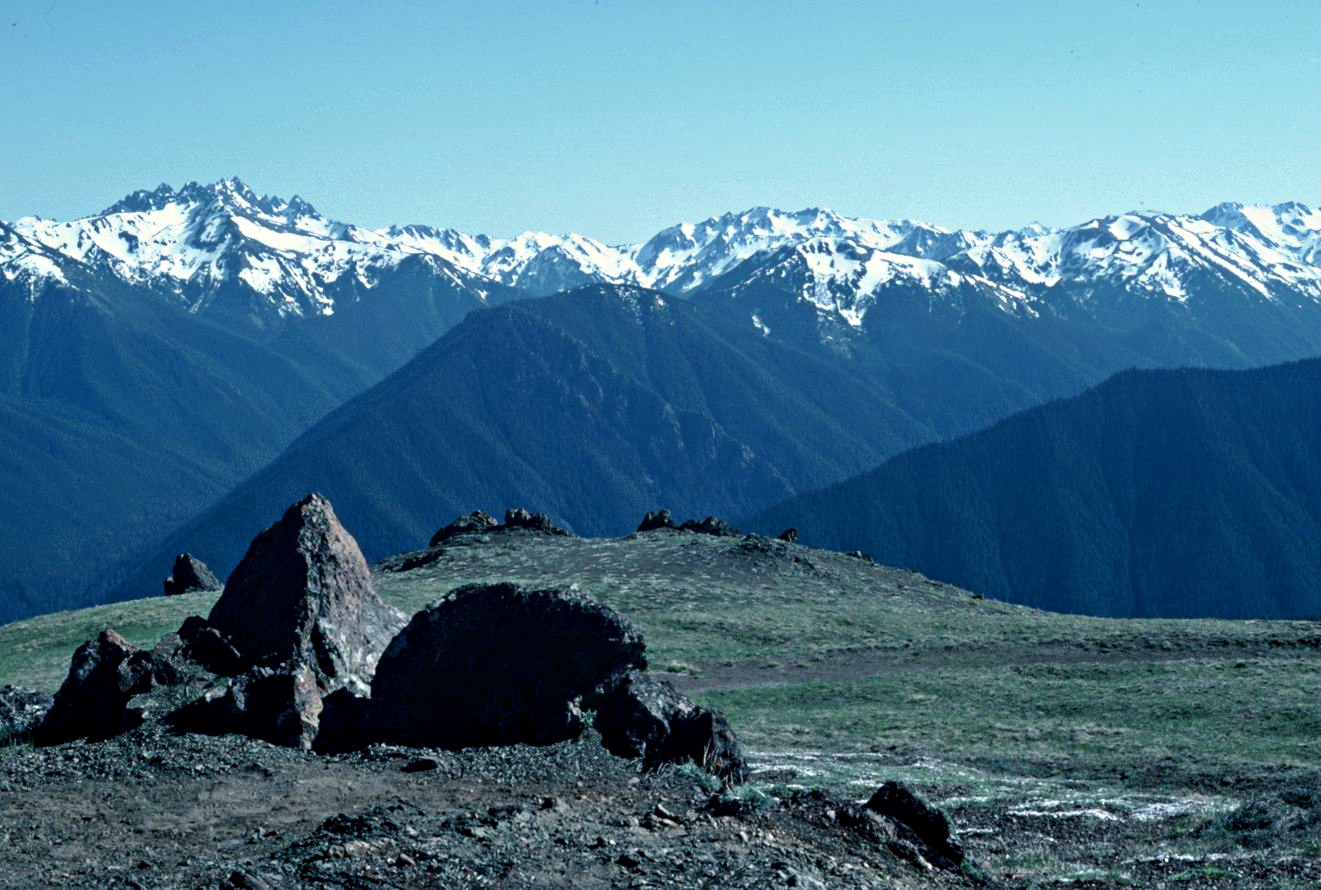
Summit vista, looking south

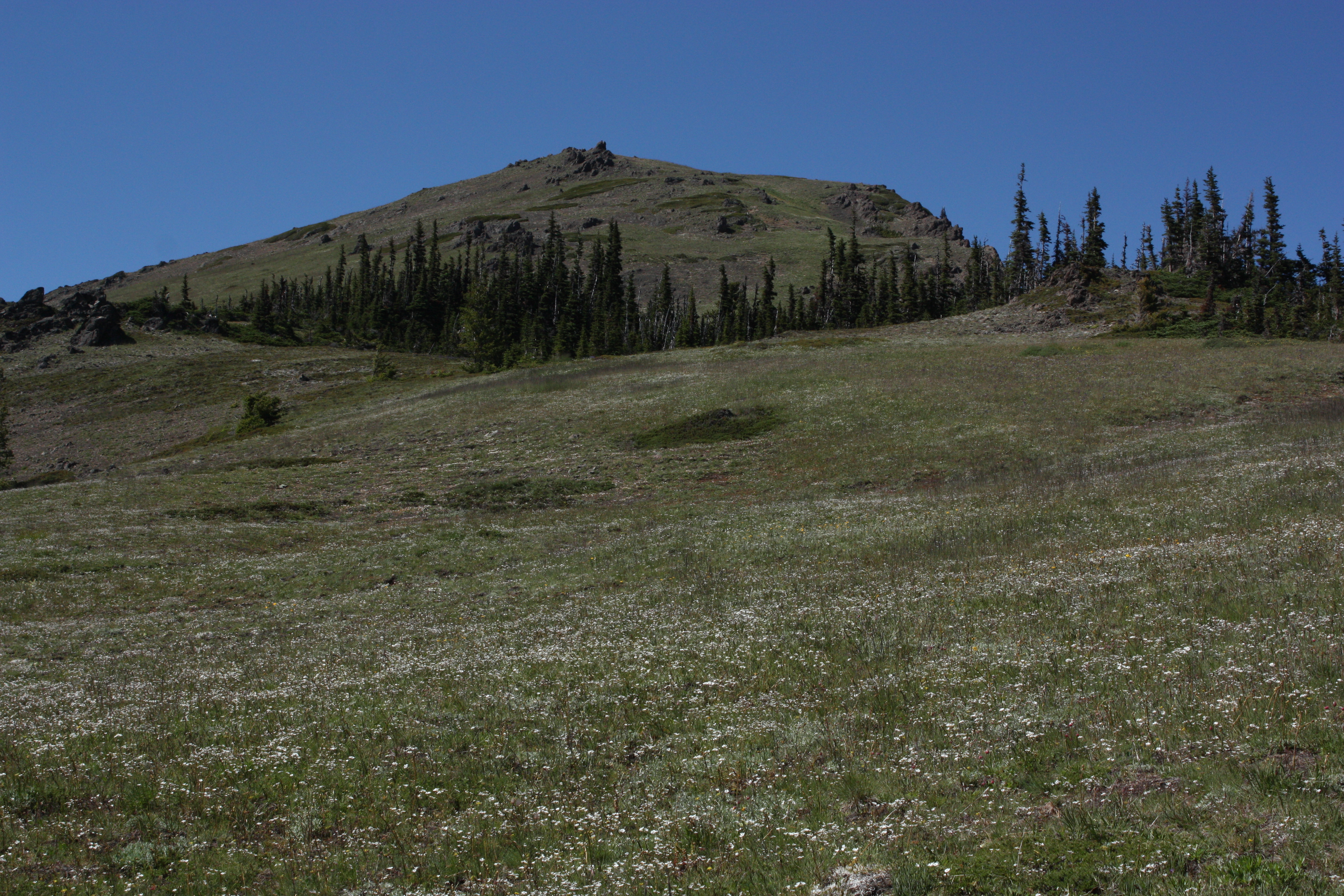
View of summit from Deer Park

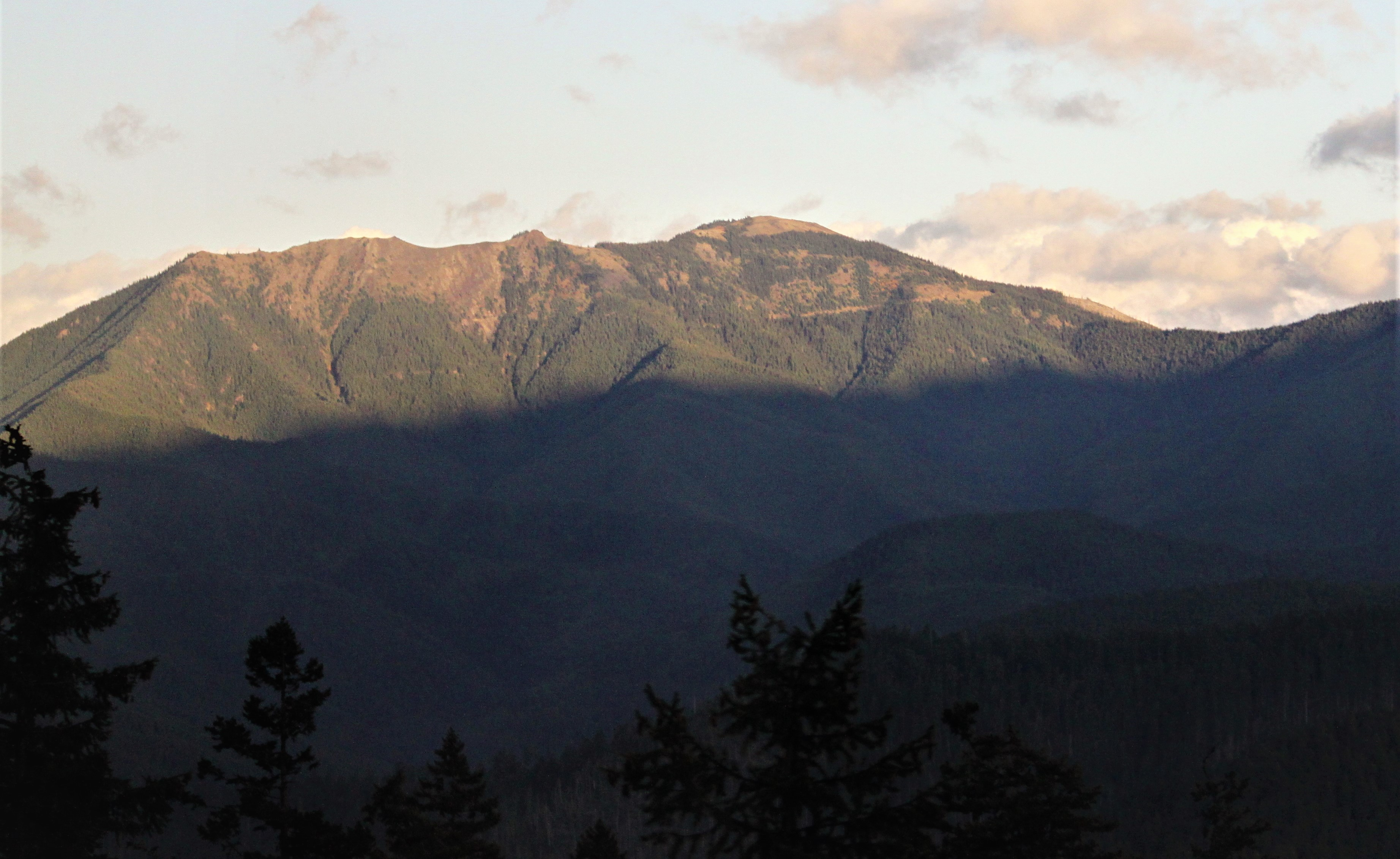
West aspect near sunset
