= Elk Mountain (Clallam County, Washington) =

Mountain in Washington (state), United States

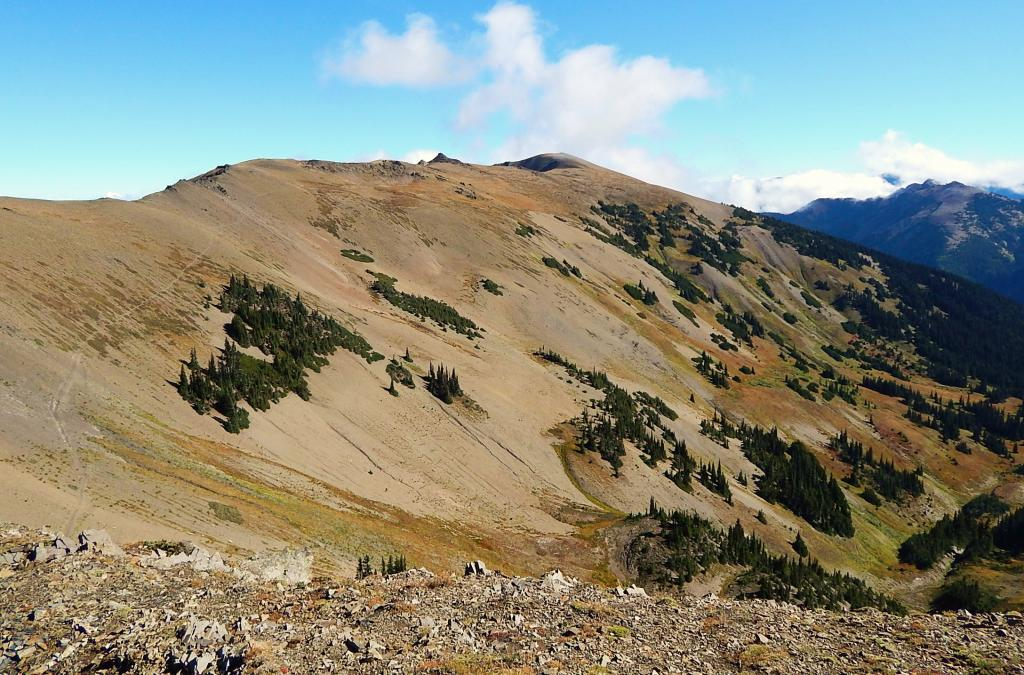
- Elk Mountain seen from Obstruction Peak

Highest point
- Elevation: 6,773 ft (2,064 m)
- Prominence: 813 ft (248 m)
- Coordinates: 47°55′29″N 123°21′07″W

Geography
- Location within Washington (state) Location within the United States
- Country: United States
- State: Washington
- County: Clallam
- Protected area: Olympic National Park
- Parent range: Olympic Mountains
- Topo map: USGS Maiden Peak

Geology
- Rock age: Eocene
- Rock type: Shale

Climbing
- Easiest route: Hiking Trail

Elk Mountain is a 6,773-foot elevation (2,064 m) mountain summit located in the Olympic Mountains, in Clallam County of Washington state. It is set within Olympic National Park and is situated at the eastern end of Hurricane Ridge. The nearest higher peak is McCartney Peak, 5.12 mi (8.24 km) to the south-southwest. Precipitation runoff from the south slope of the mountain drains into tributaries of the Dungeness River, whereas the north slope is drained by tributaries of Morse Creek which thence empties into the Strait of Juan de Fuca.

== Climate ==
Set in the north-central portion of the Olympic Mountains, Elk Mountain is located in the marine west coast climate zone of western North America. Weather fronts originating in the Pacific Ocean travel northeast toward the Olympic Mountains. As fronts approach, they are forced upward by the peaks (orographic lift), causing them to drop their moisture in the form of rain or snow. As a result, the Olympics experience high precipitation, especially during the winter months in the form of snowfall. Because of maritime influence, snow tends to be wet and heavy, resulting in high avalanche danger. During winter months weather is usually cloudy, but due to high pressure systems over the Pacific Ocean that intensify during summer months, there is often little or no cloud cover during the summer.

== Geology ==
The Olympic Mountains are composed of obducted clastic wedge material and oceanic crust, primarily Eocene sandstone, turbidite, and basaltic oceanic crust. The mountains were sculpted during the Pleistocene era by erosion and glaciers advancing and retreating multiple times.

== Etymology ==
Olympic National Park is home to the largest unmanaged herd of Roosevelt elk in the Pacific Northwest. Named after President Theodore Roosevelt, they are North America's largest variety of elk. It is ironic that none are now found in the area of Elk Mountain. As for the mountain's name origin: According to a 1984 field guide:

There is a story told that in 1890, William Wooding, a local homesteader, along with some friends, slaughtered 15-20 elk at this spot, leaving their carcasses to decay in the woods. Upon returning to civilization, Wooding made the mistake of bragging about the episode. He and his friends were promptly ordered by the authorities to return to the site and carry out the dead elk.

== Gallery ==
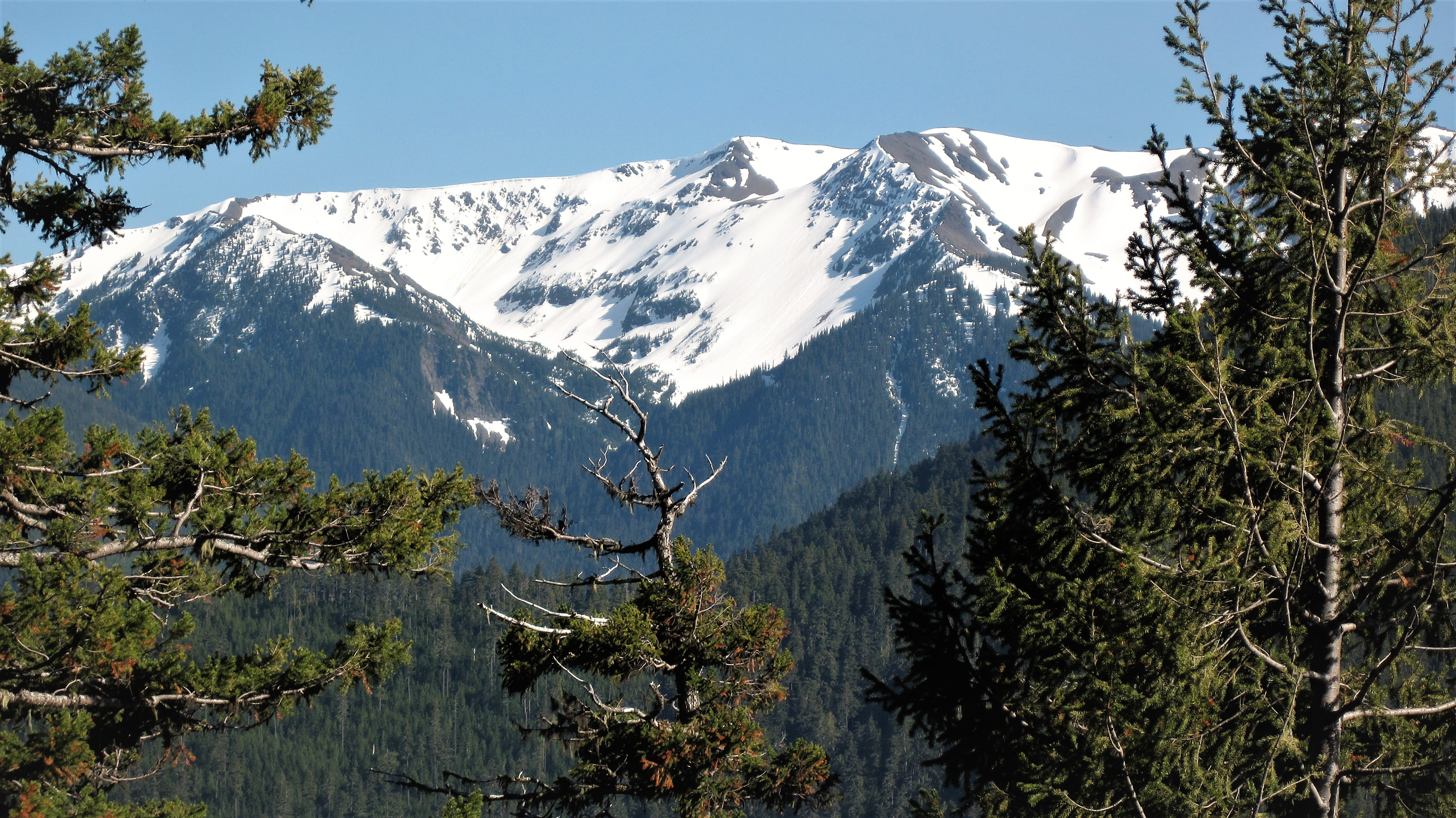
Elk Mountain seen from Hurricane Ridge

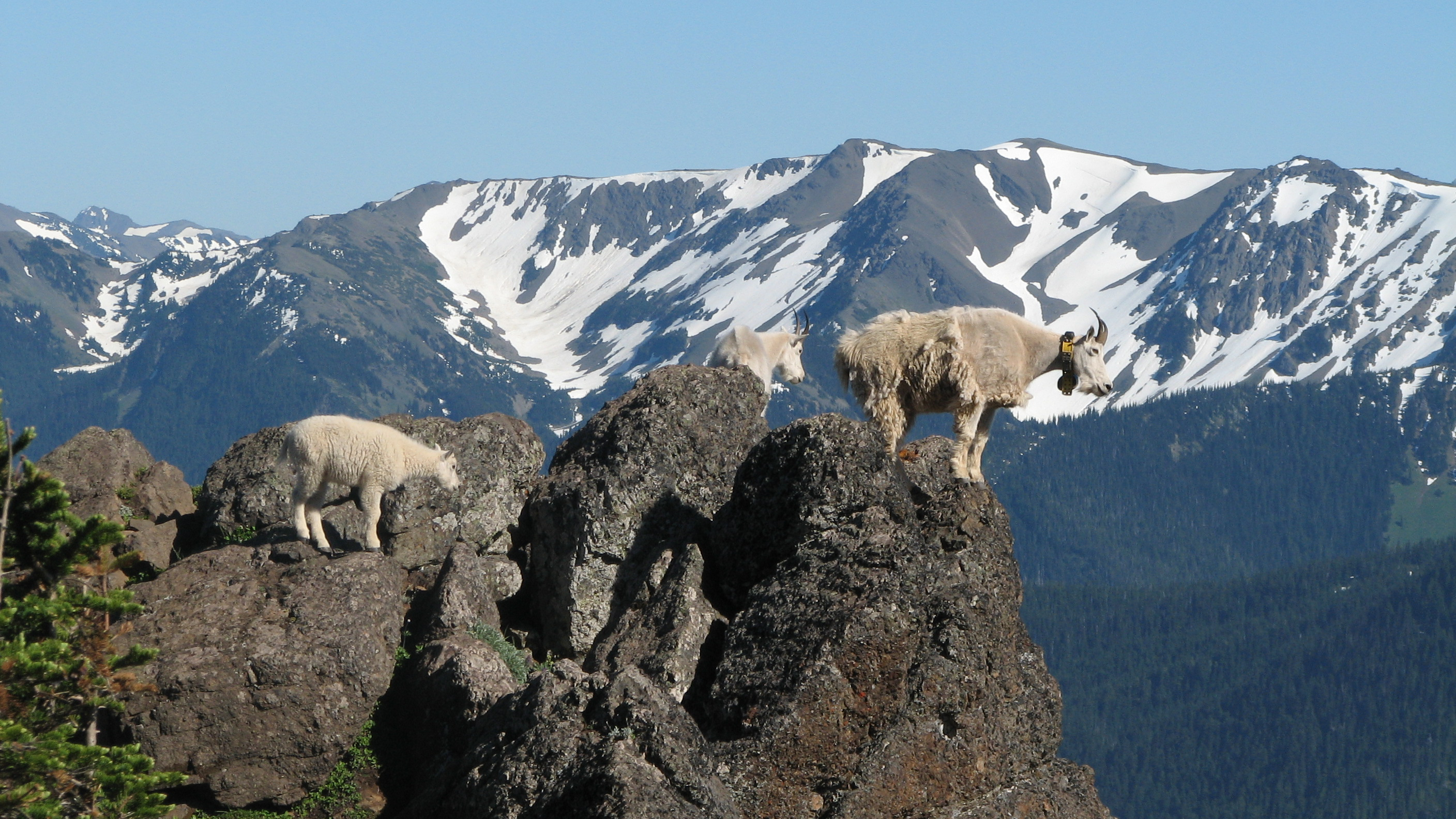
North aspect of Elk Mountain in the distance as seen from Rocky Peak

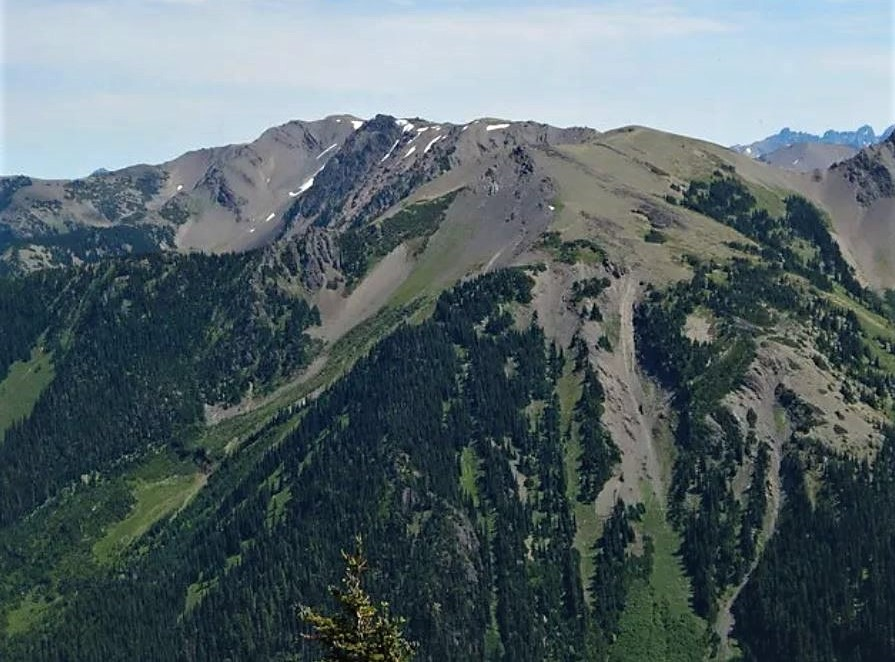
Elk Mountain seen from Eagle Point

== See also ==
- Geology of the Pacific Northwest
- Maiden Peak
