= Steeple Rock (Washington) =

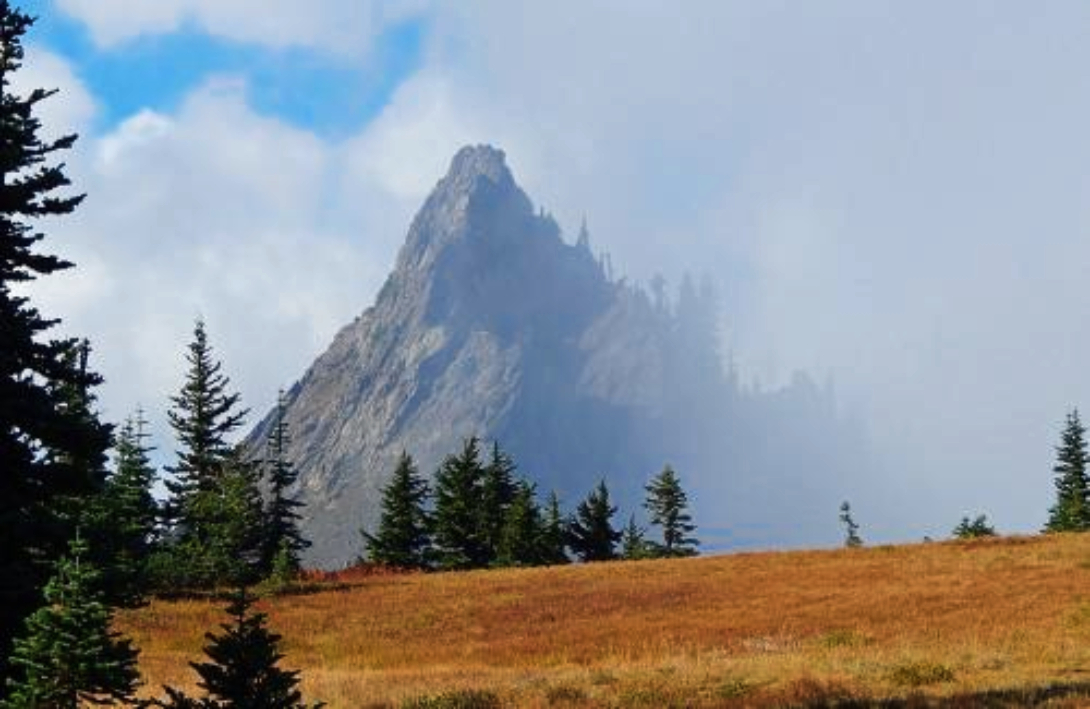
- Steeple Rock seen from the east

Highest point
- Elevation: 5,567 ft (1,697 m)
- Prominence: 567 ft (173 m)
- Coordinates: 47°57′43″N 123°27′15″W

Geography
- Location within Washington (state) Location within the United States
- Country: United States
- State: Washington
- County: Clallam
- Protected area: Olympic National Park
- Parent range: Olympic Mountains
- Topo map: USGS Mount Angeles

Geology
- Rock age: Eocene
- Rock type: Basalt

Climbing
- Easiest route: Scrambling class 3

Steeple Rock is a 200-foot (61 meter) basalt pillar in the Olympic Mountains, and is located in Clallam County of Washington state. It rises next to the Obstruction Point Road on Hurricane Ridge within Olympic National Park. It's situated midway between Eagle Point and the Hurricane Ridge Visitor Center. Precipitation runoff drains into tributaries of the Elwha River and Morse Creek, thence to the Strait of Juan de Fuca.

== Climate ==
Set in the north-central portion of the Olympic Mountains, Steeple Rock is located in the marine west coast climate zone of western North America. Weather fronts originating in the Pacific Ocean travel northeast toward the Olympic Mountains. As fronts approach, they are forced upward by the peaks (orographic lift), causing them to drop their moisture in the form of rain or snow. As a result, the Olympics experience high precipitation, especially during the winter months in the form of snowfall. Because of maritime influence, snow tends to be wet and heavy, resulting in avalanche danger. During winter months weather is usually cloudy, but due to high pressure systems over the Pacific Ocean that intensify during summer months, there is often little or no cloud cover during the summer.

== Geology ==
The Olympic Mountains are made up of obducted clastic wedge material and oceanic crust. They are primarily Eocene sandstones, turbidites, and basaltic oceanic crust. Unlike the Cascades, the Olympic Mountains are not volcanic, and contain no granite.

Millions of years ago, vents and fissures opened under the Pacific Ocean and lava flowed forth, creating huge underwater mountains and ranges called seamounts. The Farallon tectonic plate that formed a part of the Pacific Ocean floor (separate from the Pacific plate) inched eastward toward North America about 35 million years ago and most of the sea floor subducted beneath the continental land mass of the North America plate. Some of the sea floor, however, was scraped off and jammed against the mainland, creating the dome that was the forerunner of today's Olympics. Thrust-faulting northeast into the Vancouver Island/North Cascades corner pushes Olympic rock upward and southwestward, resulting in strata that appear to be standing on edge and that intermix with strata of different mineral composition. All this occurred under water; the Olympics began to rise above the sea only 10–20 million years ago.

== Gallery ==
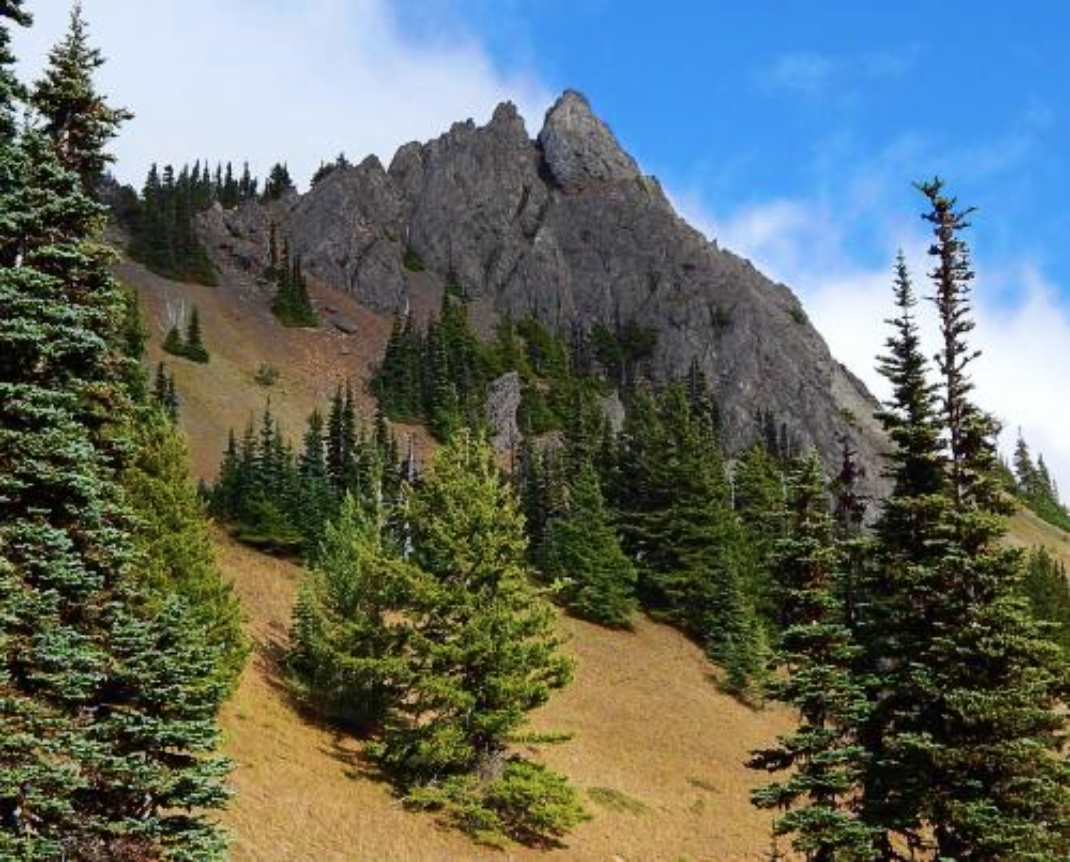
Steeple Rock seen from Obstruction Point Road

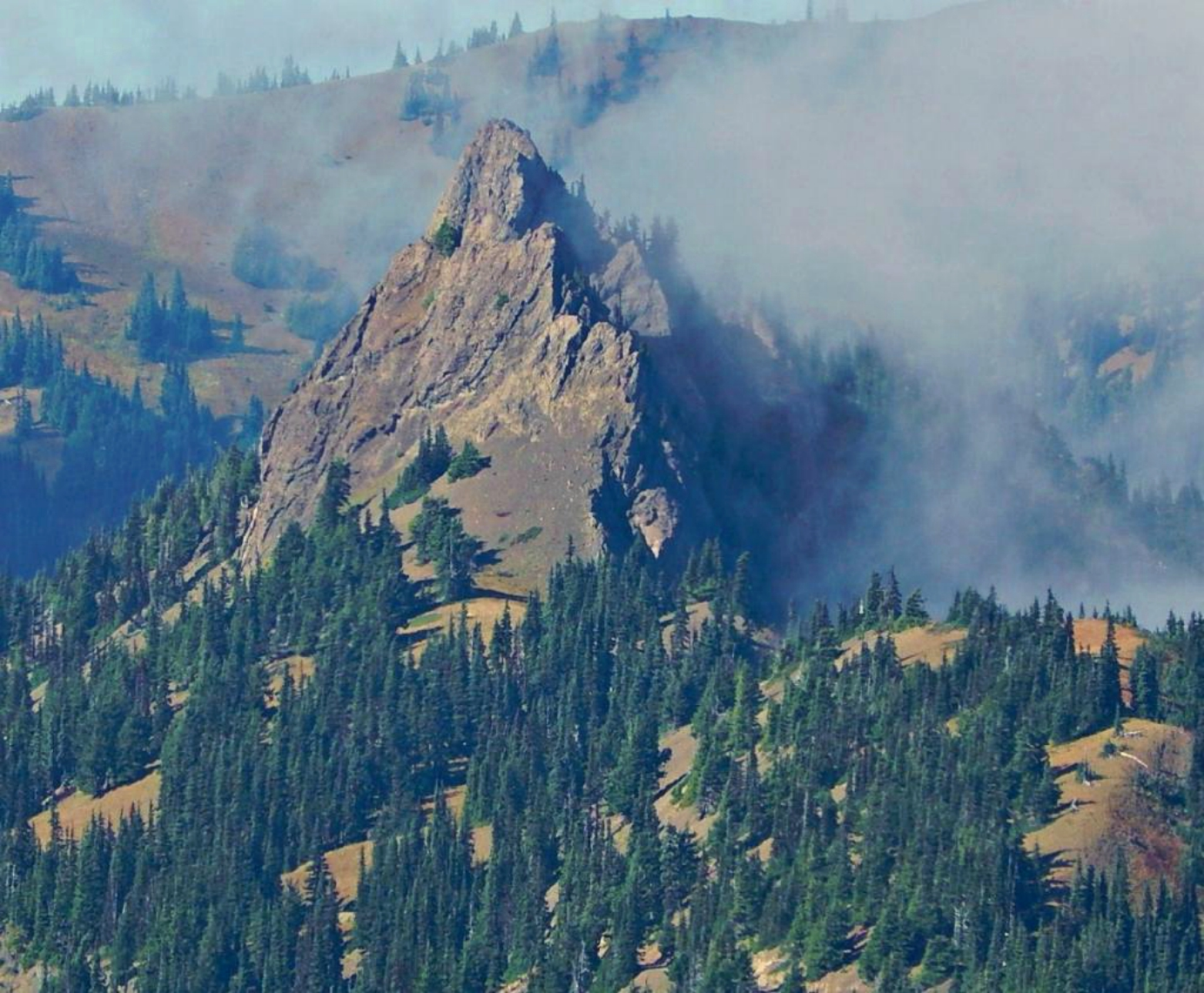
Steeple Rock seen from southeast

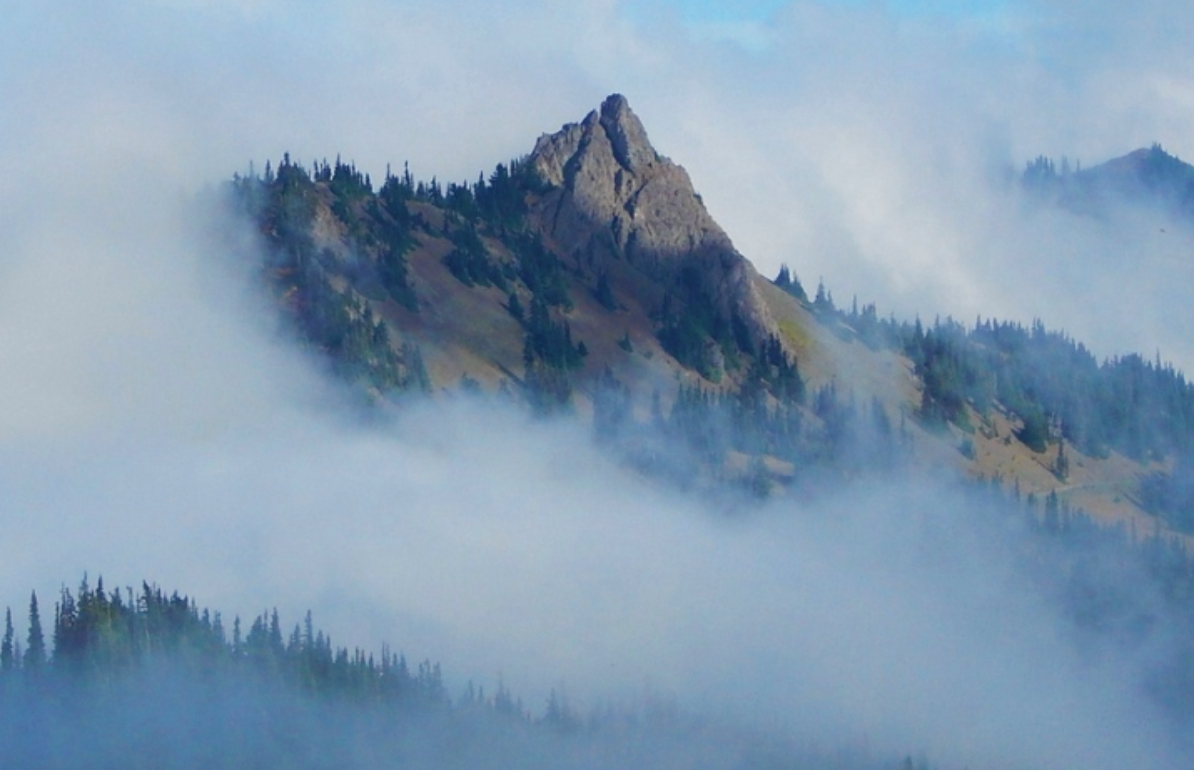
Steeple Rock in clouds

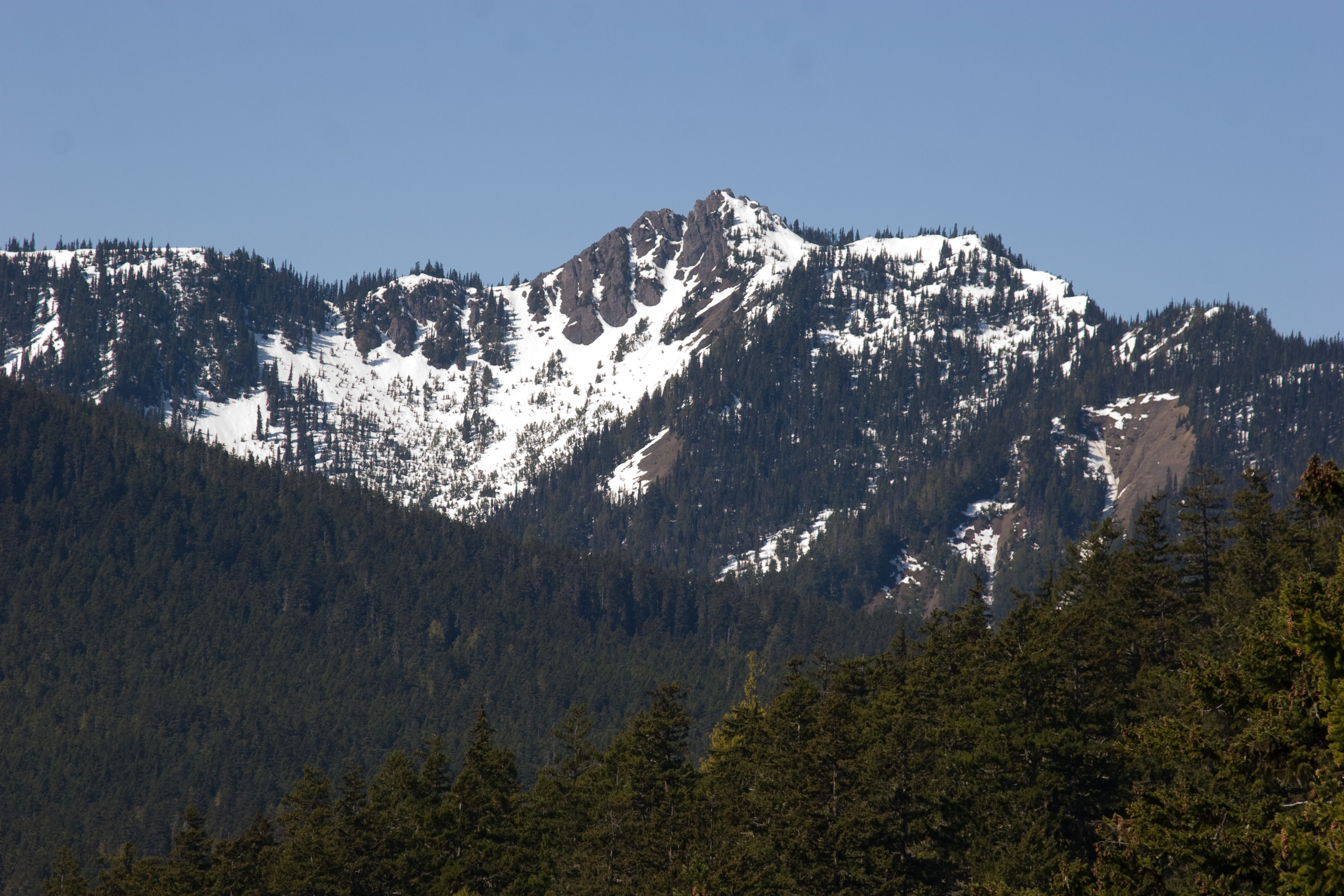
North aspect from Hurricane Ridge Road
