= Maiden Peak (Washington) =

Mountain in Washington (state), United States

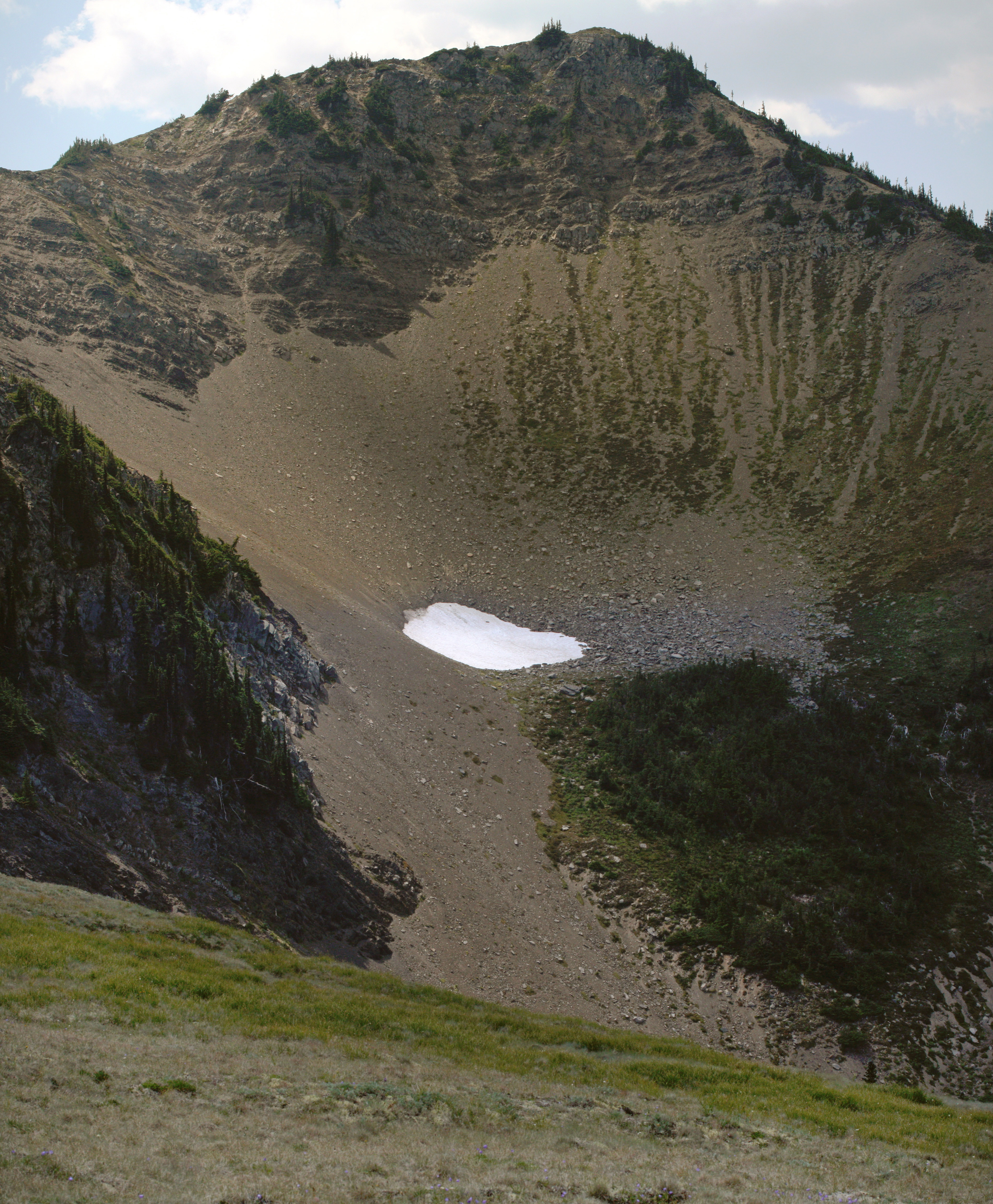
- North aspect of Maiden Peak

Highest point
- Elevation: 6,434 ft (1,961 m)
- Prominence: 474 ft (144 m)
- Parent peak: Elk Mountain (6,773 ft)
- Isolation: 1.63 mi (2.62 km)
- Coordinates: 47°56′05″N 123°19′13″W

Geography
- Location within Washington (state) Location within the United States
- Country: United States
- State: Washington
- County: Clallam
- Protected area: Olympic National Park
- Parent range: Olympic Mountains
- Topo map: USGS Maiden Peak

Geology
- Rock age: Eocene
- Rock type: Shale

Climbing
- Easiest route: Hiking Trail

Maiden Peak is a 6,434-foot (1,961 m) summit located in Olympic National Park, in Clallam County of Washington state. It is part of the Olympic Mountains and is situated near the eastern end of Hurricane Ridge within the Daniel J. Evans Wilderness. The nearest higher neighbor is Elk Mountain, 1.62 mi (2.61 km) to the west-southwest, and Blue Mountain is set 3.14 mi (5.05 km) to the east-northeast. The peak is set approximately midway along the trail which connects Deer Park and Obstruction Point. Precipitation runoff from the south slope of the mountain drains into Grand Creek, whereas the north slope is drained by Maiden Creek, and all ultimately reaches the Strait of Juan de Fuca. Topographic relief is significant as the summit rises 3,000 feet (910 m) above Grand Creek in one mile. This landform's name was officially adopted in 1961 by the U.S. Board on Geographic Names. One story has the origin of the name being derived from nearby Maiden Lake where young men and women camped around 1913, and the other being from a group of hikers that passed this area.

== Climate ==
Set in the north-central portion of the Olympic Mountains, Maiden Peak is located in the marine west coast climate zone of western North America. Weather fronts originating in the Pacific Ocean travel northeast toward the Olympic Mountains. As fronts approach, they are forced upward by the peaks (orographic lift), causing them to drop their moisture in the form of rain or snow. As a result, the Olympics experience high precipitation, especially during the winter months in the form of snowfall. Because of maritime influence, snow tends to be wet and heavy, resulting in avalanche danger. During winter months weather is usually cloudy, but due to high pressure systems over the Pacific Ocean that intensify during summer months, there is often little or no cloud cover during the summer.

== Geology ==
The Olympic Mountains are composed of obducted clastic wedge material and oceanic crust, primarily Eocene sandstone, turbidite, and basaltic oceanic crust. The mountains were sculpted during the Pleistocene era by erosion and glaciers advancing and retreating multiple times.

== Gallery ==
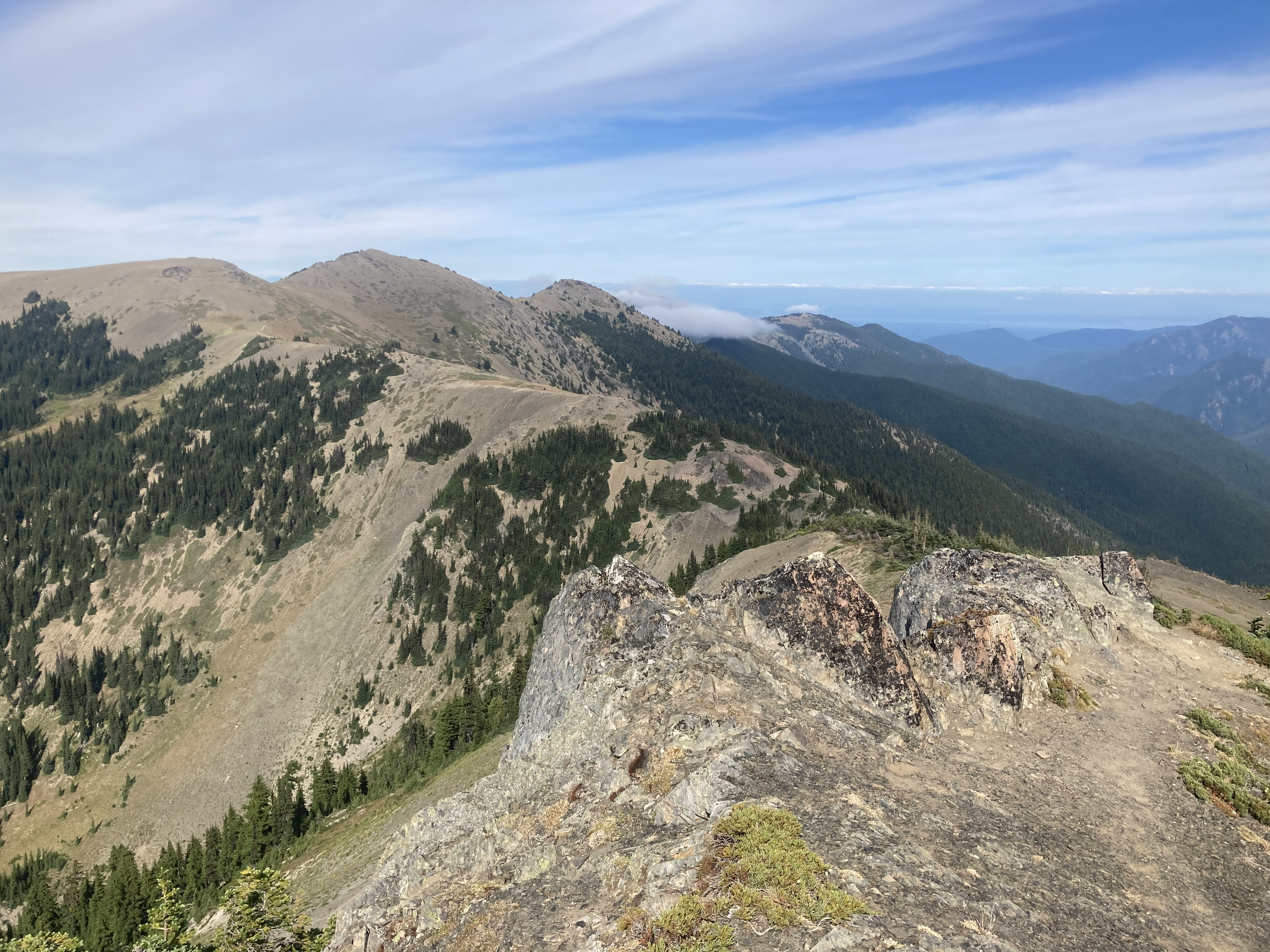
Southwest aspect of Maiden Peak (upper left) seen from near Elk Mountain.

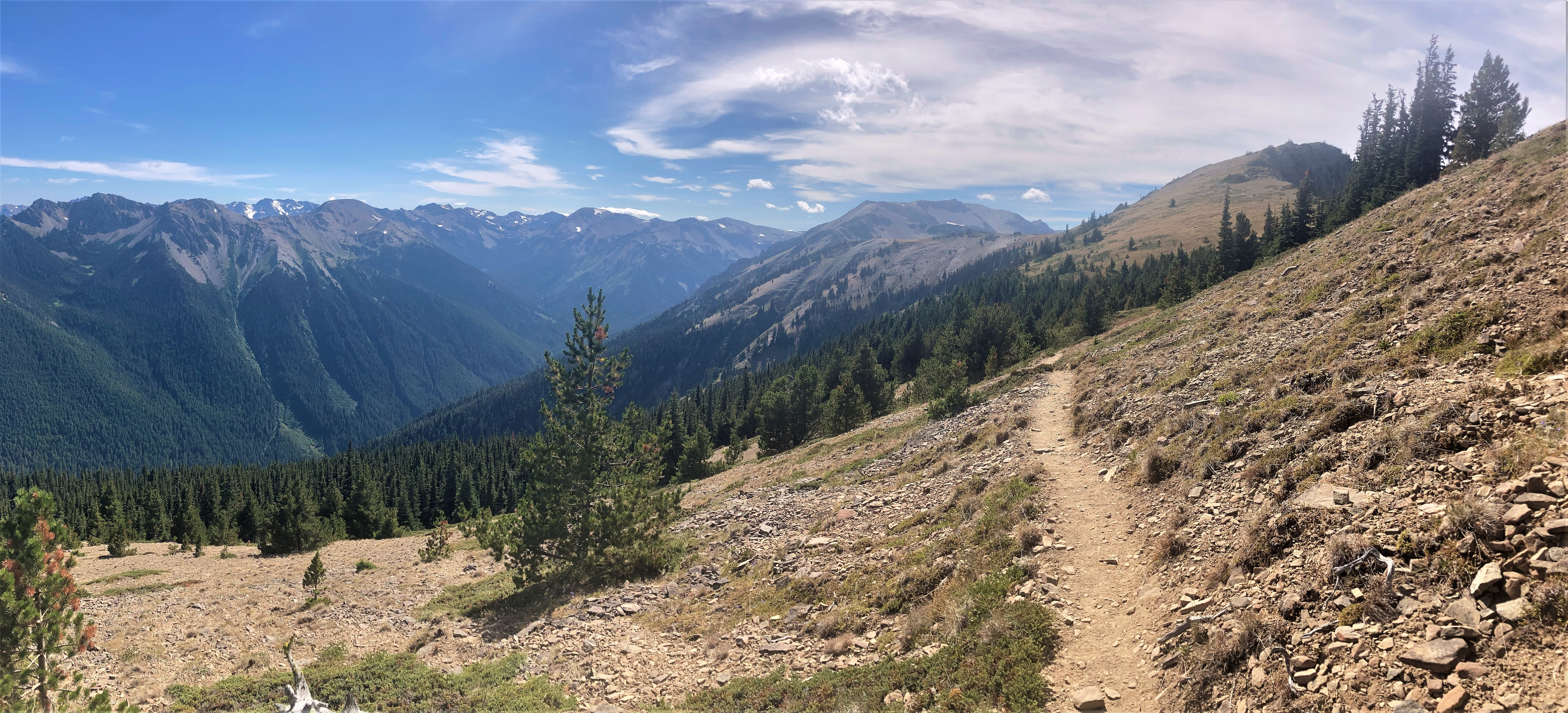
View from the trail on Maiden Peak, looking southwest.

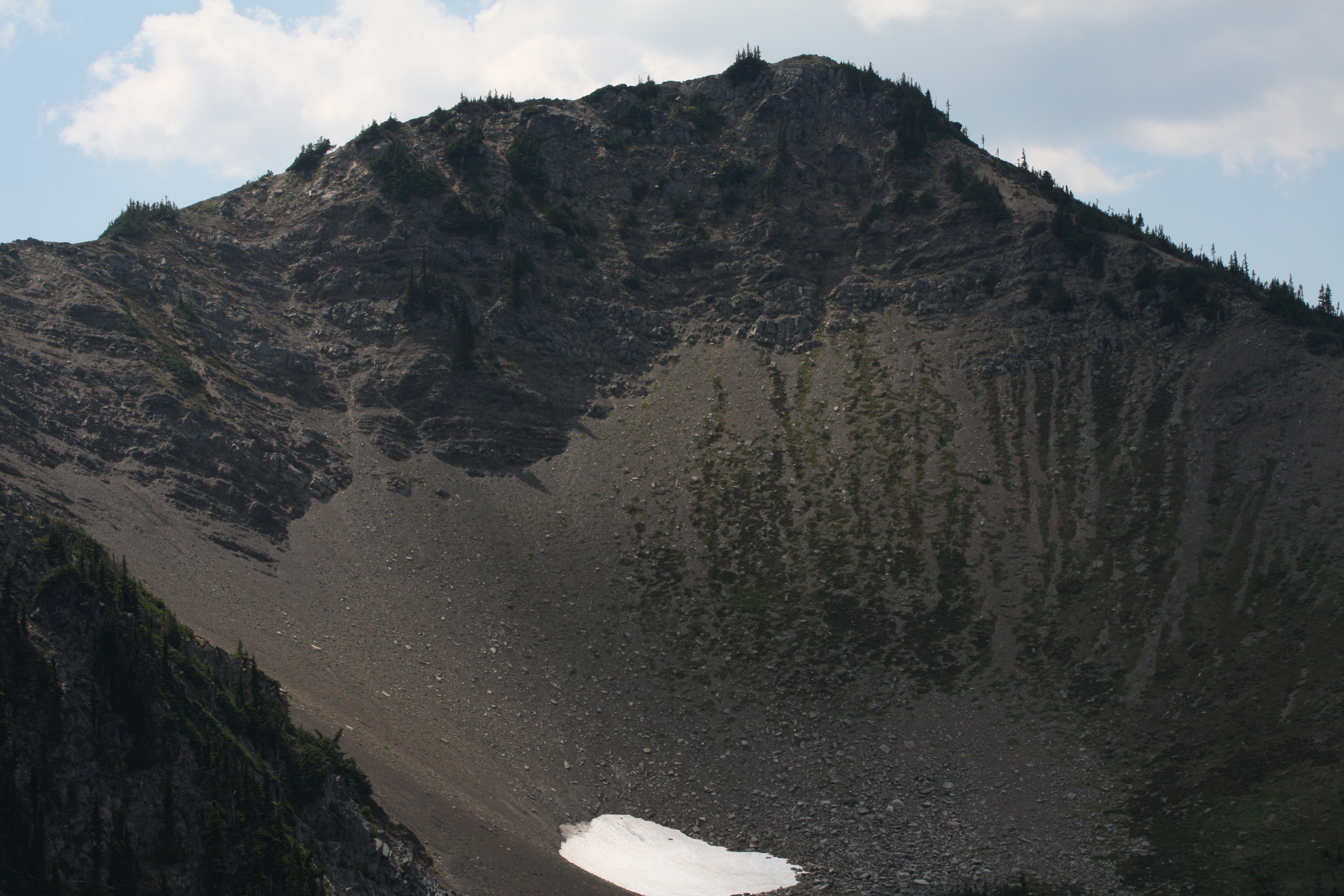
North face

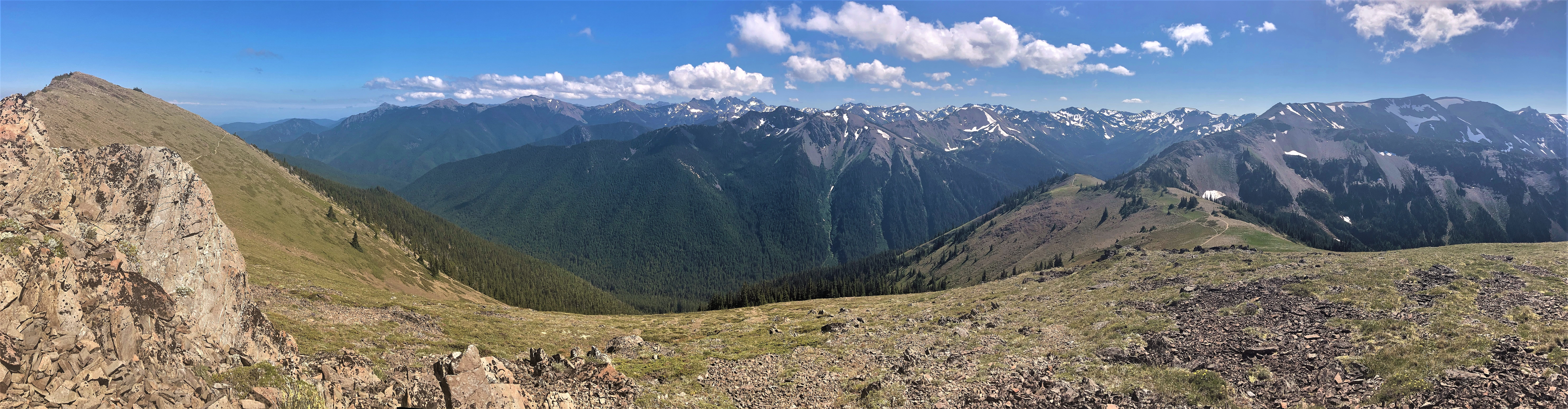
View from the 6,380' west peak of Maiden Peak. True summit at far left. Elk Mountain to far right.

== See also ==
- Olympic Mountains
- Geology of the Pacific Northwest
