= Hurricane Ridge =

Mountainous area in Olympic National Park

- A drive to the Hurricane Ridge Visitor Center up Hurricane Ridge Road in May 2022.

Highest point
- Peak: Elk Mountain
- Elevation: 6,772 ft (2,064 m)
- Coordinates: 47°55′28″N 123°21′07″W

Dimensions
- Length: 13 mi (21 km) East-West
- Width: 5 mi (8.0 km) North-South

Geography
- Location within Washington (state) Location within the United States
- Location: Olympic National Park; Clallam County, Washington
- Country: United States
- State: Washington
- Parent range: Olympic Mountains
- Topo map(s): USGS Maiden Peak, Hurricane Hill, Mount Angeles

Geology
- Rock age: Eocene

Hurricane Ridge is a mountainous area in Washington's Olympic National Park. Approximately 18 miles (29 km) by road from Port Angeles, the ridge is open to hiking, skiing, and snowboarding and is one of the two most visited sites in the national park (along with the Hoh Rainforest).

At an elevation of 5,242 feet (1,598 m), Hurricane Ridge is a year-round destination. In summer, visitors come for views of the Olympic Mountains, as well as for hiking. During the winter months the small, family oriented Hurricane Ridge Ski and Snowboard Area offers lift-serviced downhill skiing and snowboarding.

The road leading west from the Hurricane Ridge visitor center has a number of picnic areas and trail heads. A paved trail called the Hurricane Hill trail is about 1.6 miles (2.6 km) long (one-way) with an elevation gain of about 700 feet (200 m). It is not uncommon to find snow on the trails even as late as July. Several other dirt trails of varying distances and difficulty levels branch off of the Hurricane hill trail. The picnic areas are open only in the summer, and have restrooms, water and paved access to picnic tables.

The visitor center was destroyed by a fire in May 2023; as a result, the area was temporarily closed to visitors for a month before it reopened with limited entry.

Hurricane Ridge is named for its intense gales and winds. The weather in the Olympic Mountains is unpredictable, and visitors should be prepared for snow at any time of year. The area receives 400 inches (10,000 mm) of snowfall annually.

== History ==
The Hurricane Ridge Lodge and Hurricane Ridge Road were built in the 1950s as part of a plan by Fred Overly, Olympic National Park's second superintendent, to increase park visitation. The lodge was dedicated by Congressman Henry M. Jackson in September 1952. Hurricane Ridge Road was opened to traffic on January 1, 1958, after eight years of construction. The lodge's role as a concession facility was replaced in the 1980s with more interpretative uses, focusing on Olympic National Park topics including as geology and wildlife.

Skiing facilities established at Hurricane Ridge were intended to replace those at Deer Park in the 1950s, however in the following decades skiing in national parks was criticized. A new day lodge was opened in 1952 and was followed five years later by the construction of a paved road under the Mission 66 program.

The Olympic National Park began restricting winter access to Hurricane Ridge in the late 1990s, which was followed by a decline in visitor numbers. Park officials restricted winter access to Friday through Sunday in 2005. In 2011 and 2012, the park agreed to return to its original winter schedule for a trial period after the local community raised $75,000 to bridge the estimated budget gap. Despite a 35% visitor increase, Olympic National Park officials declared the trial unsuccessful and returned to three-day-a-week access during the winter months.

On May 7, 2023, the Hurricane Ridge Day Lodge and visitor center, built in 1952, was destroyed by a fire while preparations for a renovation and structural rehabilitation were underway. The National Park Service closed access to the area indefinitely as a result of the fire and later announced plans to reopen with timed entry and capacity restrictions. A set of temporary portable toilets were installed along Hurricane Ridge Road. The Hurricane Ridge area reopened on June 27 with a daily capacity of 315 private vehicles allowed due to limited space for parking; Clallam Transit's shuttle bus to Hurricane Ridge remained in operation. Vehicles were metered at the entrance, creating long backups; capacity was later raised in July to 345 vehicles per day. As of May 2025, the $80 million project to rebuild the Day Lodge and visitor center is on hold due to cuts to the National Park Service budget under the Trump administration.

== Climate ==
Based on the Köppen climate classification, Hurricane Ridge is located in the marine west coast climate zone of western North America. Most weather fronts originate in the Pacific Ocean, and travel east toward the Olympic Peninsula. As fronts approach, they are forced upward by the peaks, causing moisture to drop in the form of rain or snowfall (Orographic lift). As a result, the range experiences high precipitation, especially during the winter months. Hurricane Ridge averages 30 to 35 feet (9.1 to 10.7 m) of snow annually. During winter months, weather is usually cloudy, but due to high-pressure systems over the Pacific Ocean that intensify during summer months, there is often little or no cloud cover during the summer.

== Gallery ==
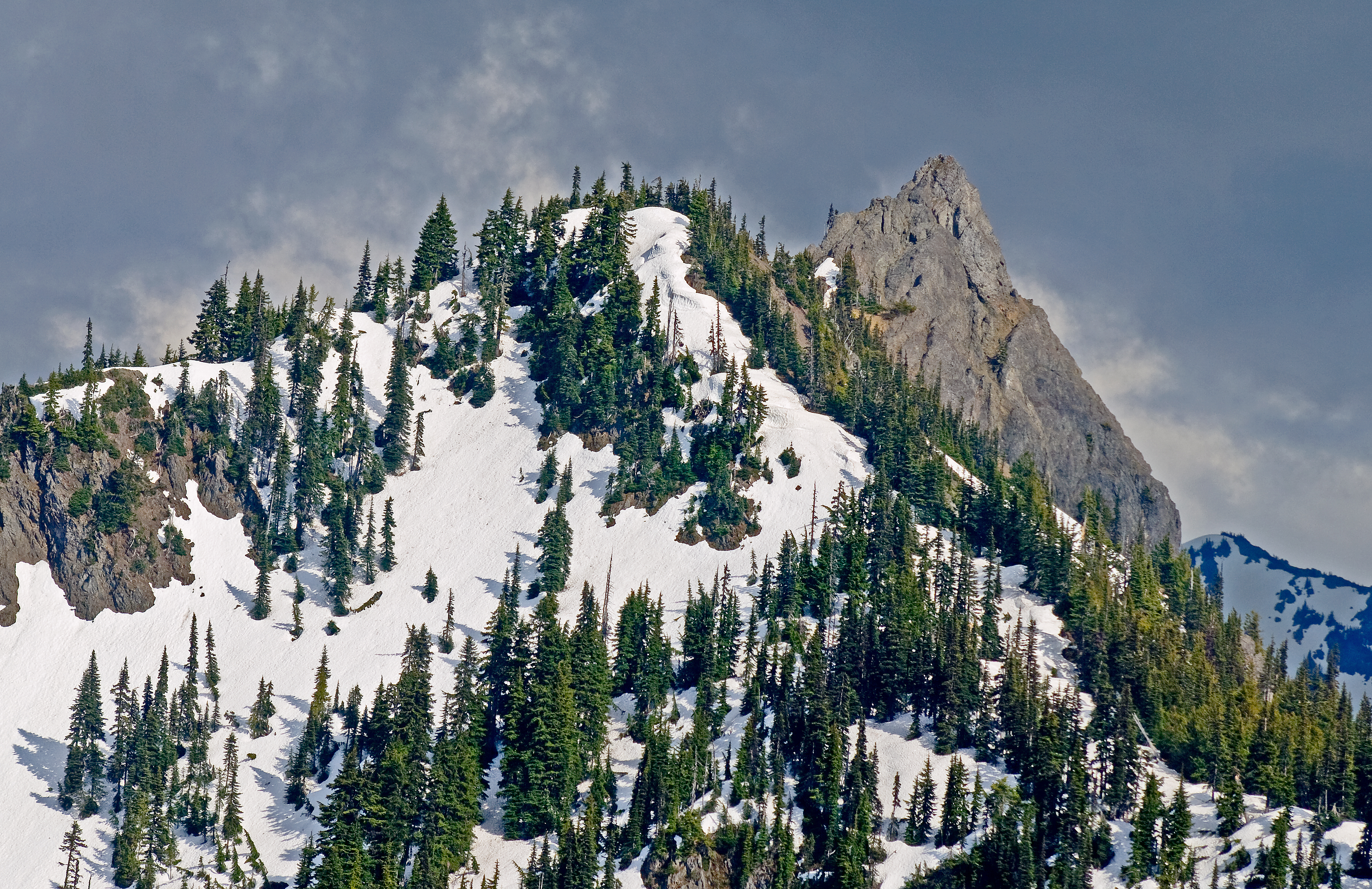
Snow in the Hurricane Ridge allows for skiing and snowboarding
(Steeple Rock featured)

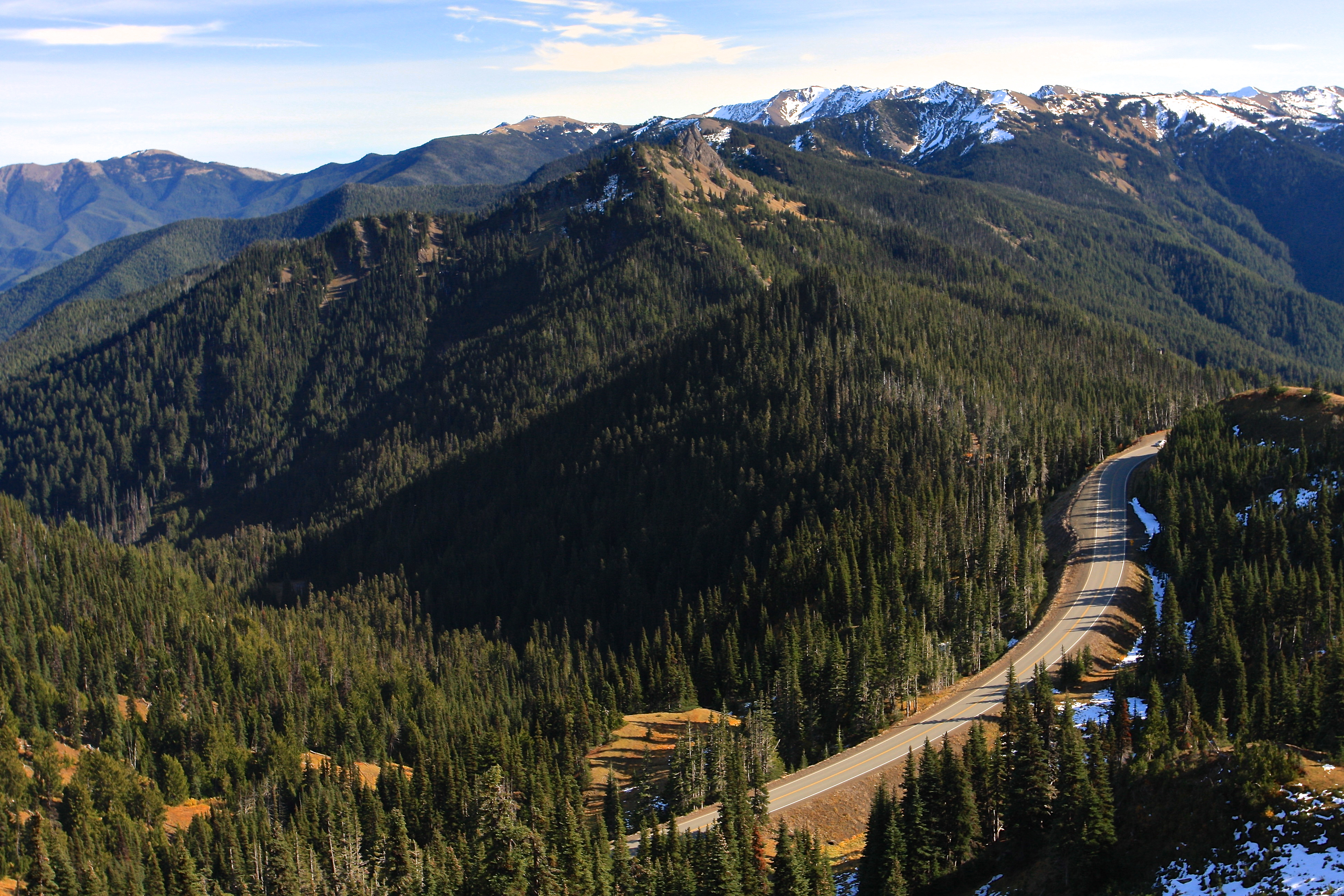
Looking southeast at peaks on Hurricane Ridge including Steeple Rock, Eagle Point, Obstruction Peak, Elk Mountain, and Maiden Peak.

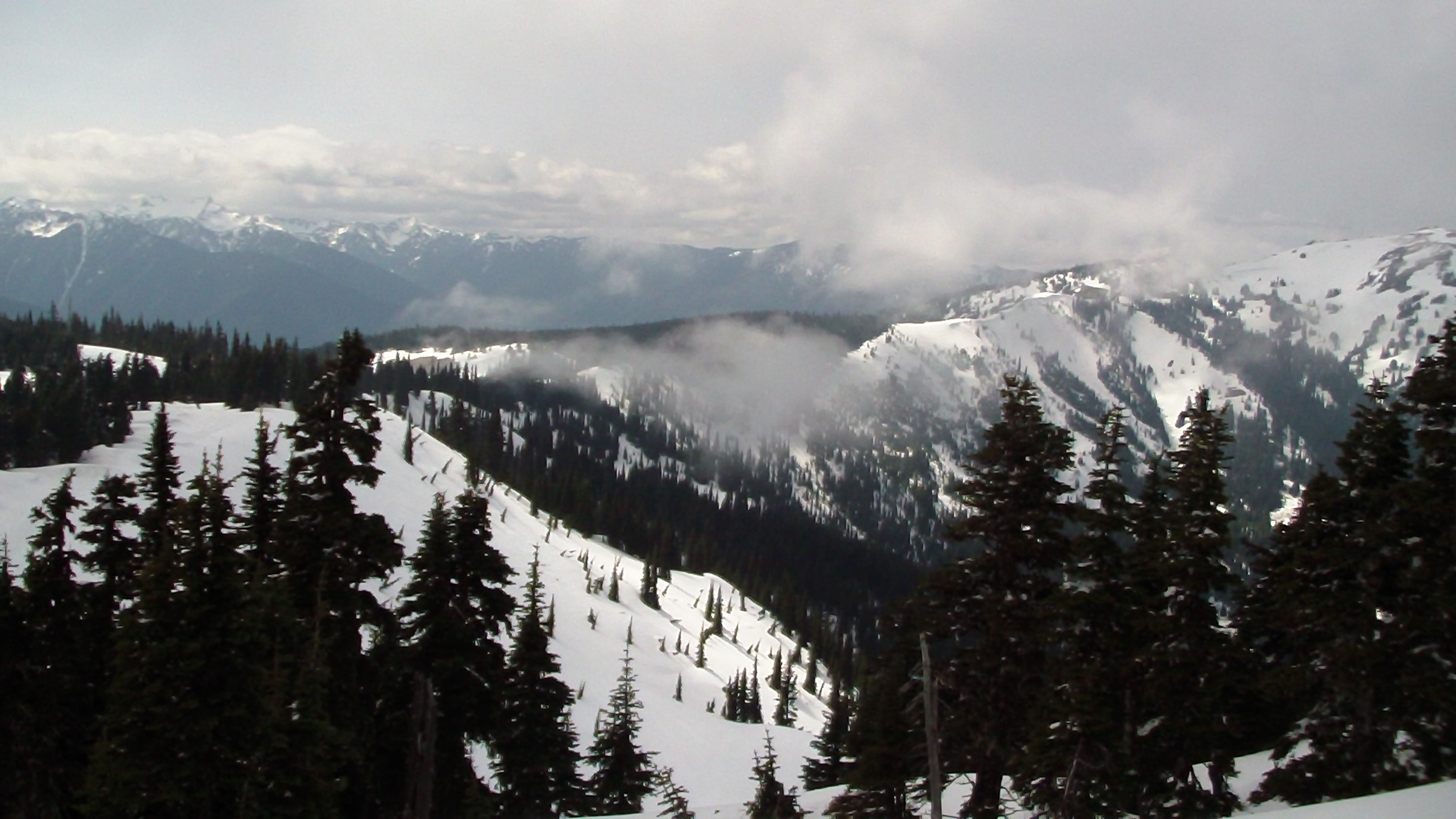
Hurricane Ridge in early May

The hiking trail west of the visitors center in the summer

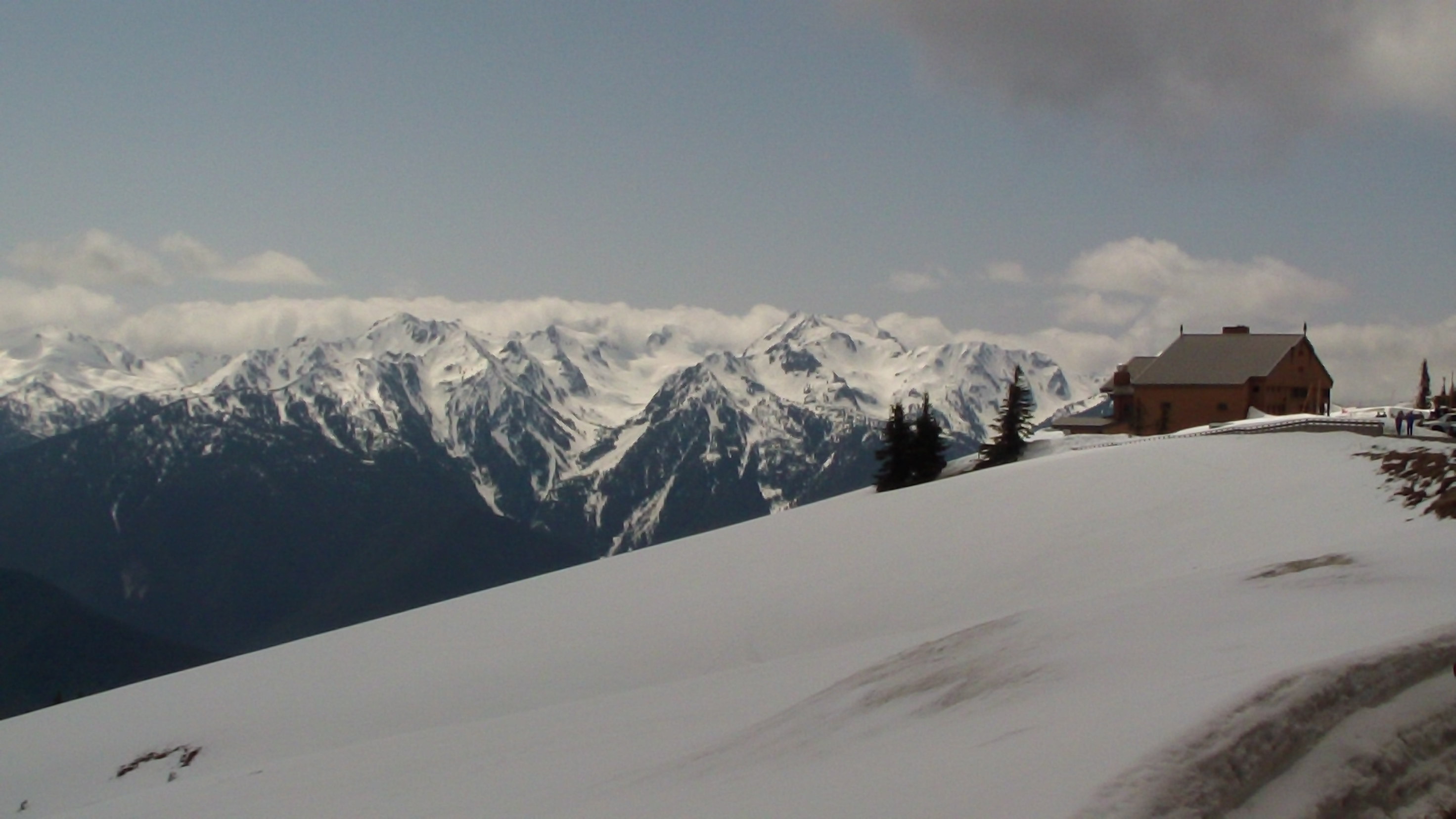
The visitors center at Hurricane Ridge, The Bailey Range beyond.

Panoramic view of the Olympic National Park. The Hurricane Ridge visitor center is on the right of the image.

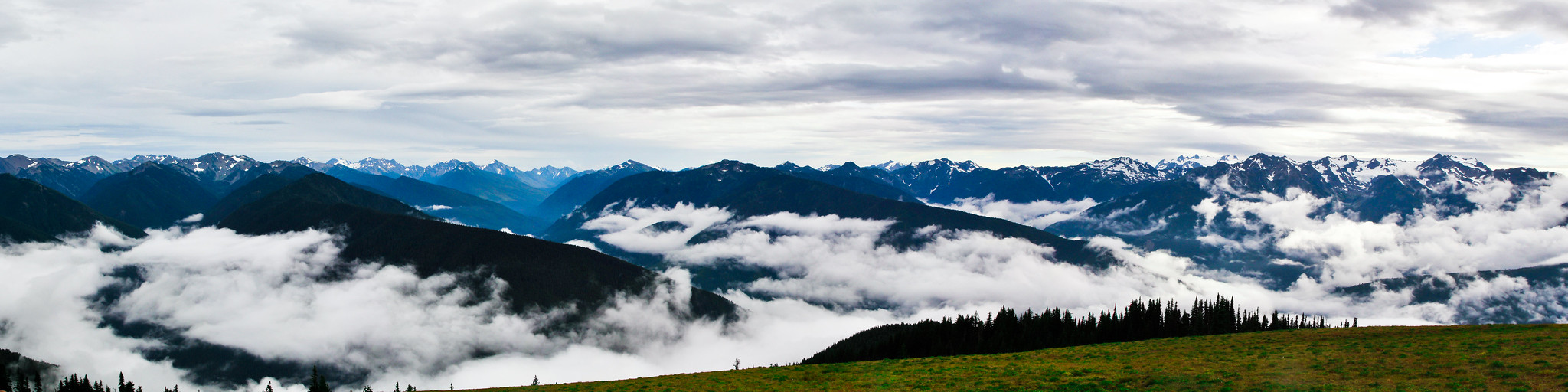
A foggy day at Hurricane Ridge, as seen from the visitor center

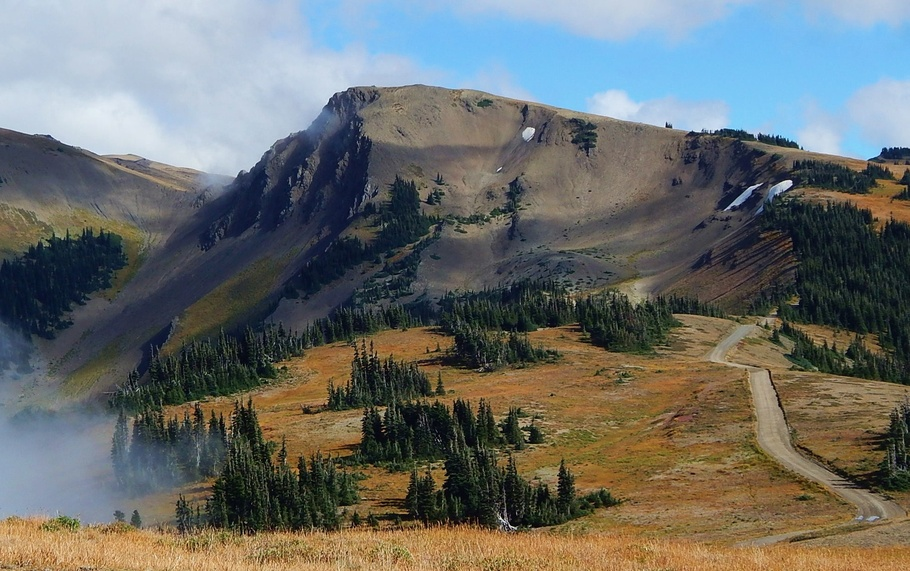
Obstruction Point Road and Obstruction Peak

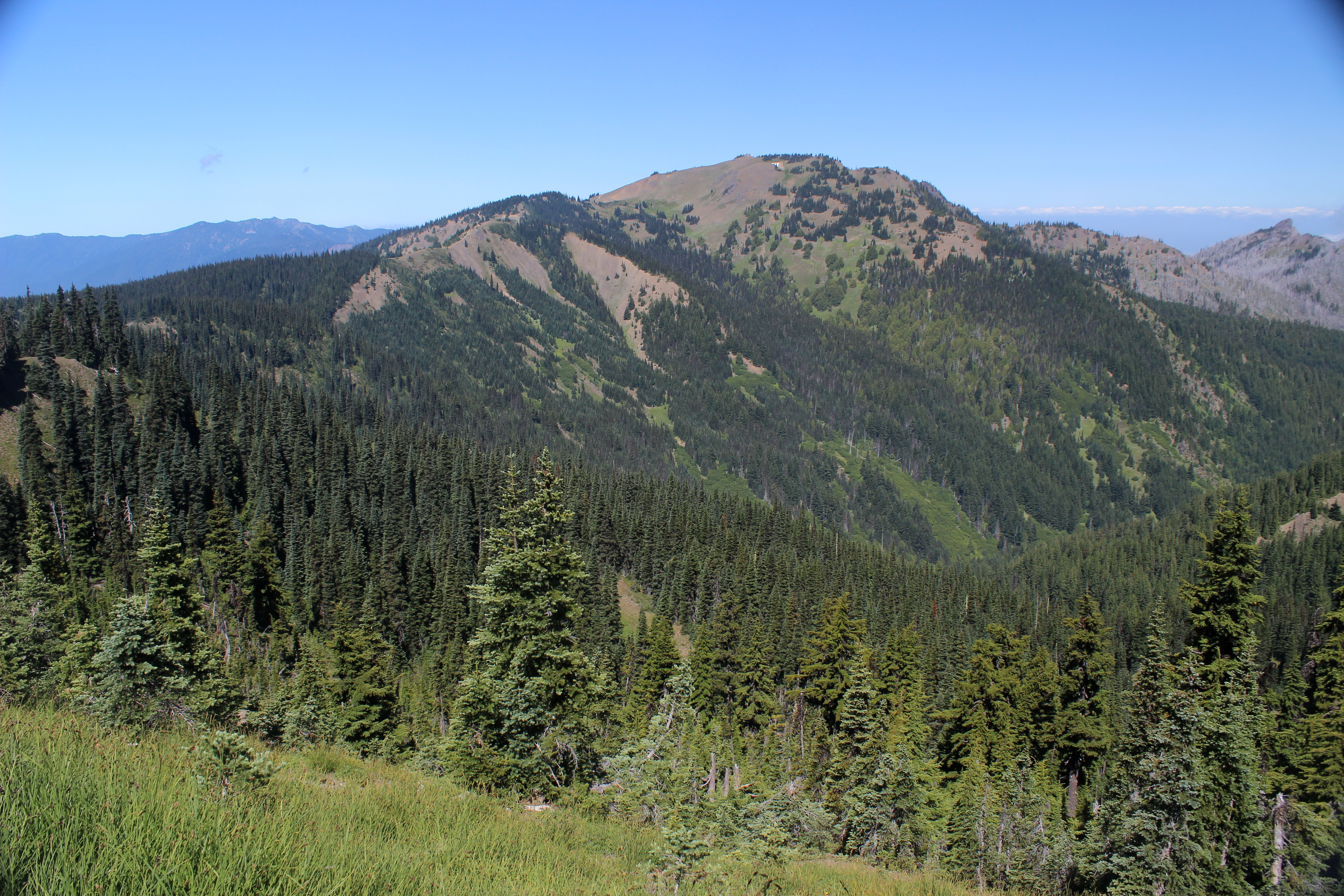
Hurricane Hill

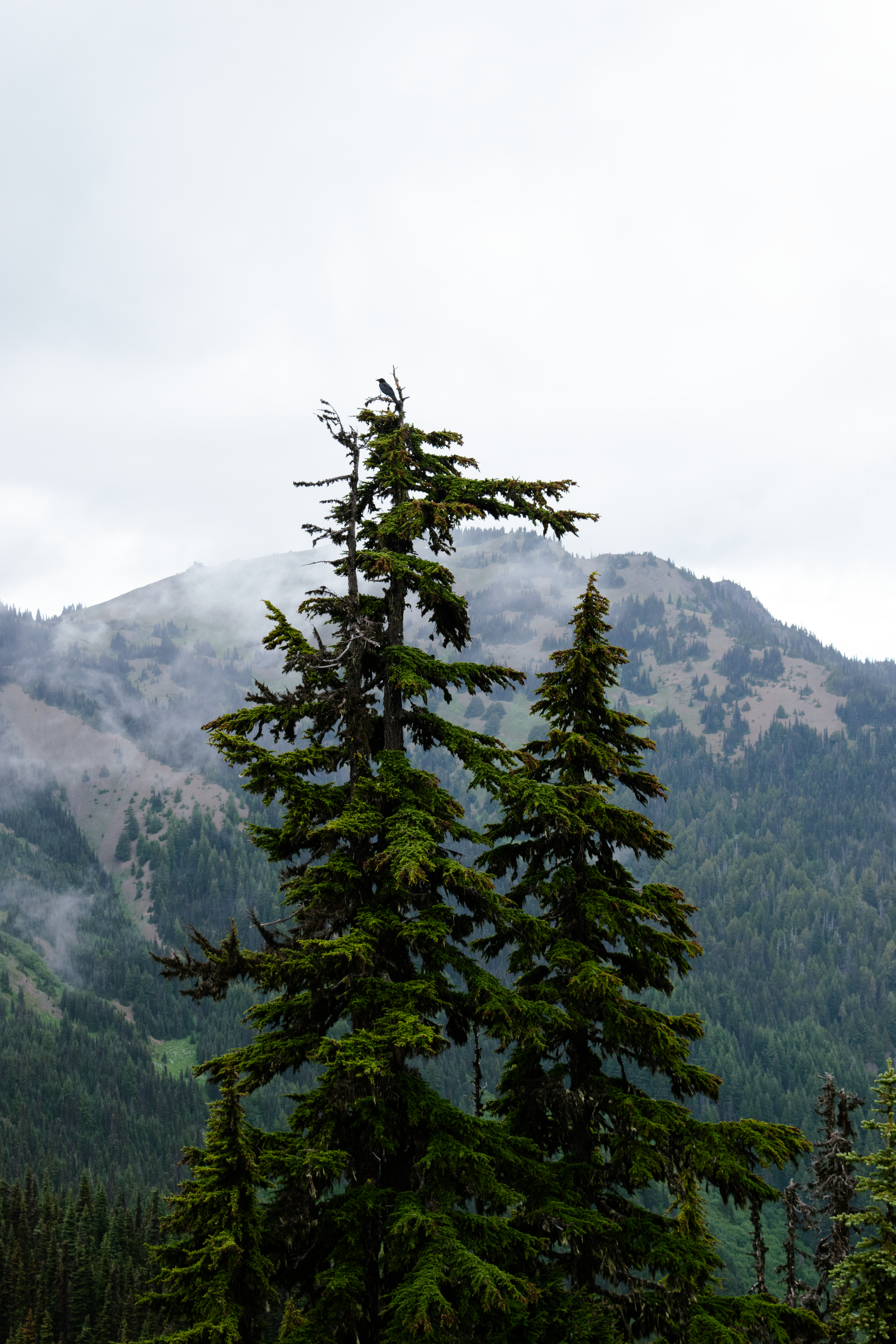
Raven perched on a tree

== Summits ==
Principal summits of Hurricane Ridge from west to east:

Name	Elevation	Prominence	Reference
Hurricane Hill	5,757 ft	707 ft	
Steeple Rock	5,567 ft	567 ft	
Eagle Point	6,247 ft	527 ft	
Obstruction Peak	6,450 ft	250 ft	
Elk Mountain	6,773 ft	813 ft	
Maiden Peak	6,434 ft	474 ft	
