= Obstruction Peak =

Mountain in Washington (state), United States

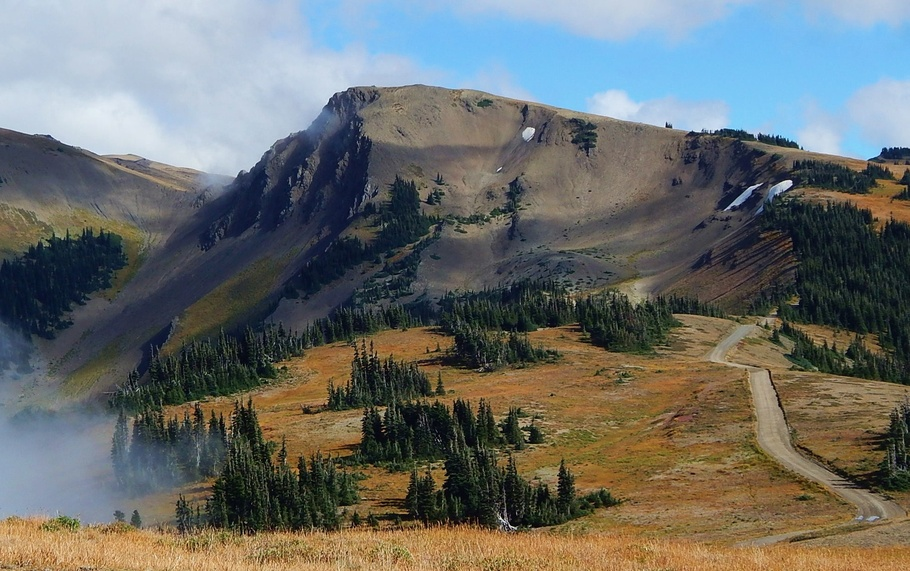
- Obstruction Peak seen from the west

Highest point
- Elevation: 6,450 ft (1,966 m)
- Prominence: 250 ft (76 m)
- Parent peak: Elk Mountain (6,773 ft)
- Isolation: 1.39 mi (2.24 km)
- Coordinates: 47°55′20″N 123°22′54″W

Geography
- Location within Washington (state) Location within the United States
- Country: United States
- State: Washington
- County: Clallam
- Protected area: Olympic National Park
- Parent range: Olympic Mountains
- Topo map: USGS Mount Angeles

Geology
- Rock age: Eocene
- Rock type: Shale

Climbing
- Easiest route: Hiking class 2

Obstruction Peak is a 6,450-foot-elevation (1,966-meter) summit in the Olympic Mountains and is located in Clallam County of Washington state. It is set within Olympic National Park and is situated at the eastern end of Obstruction Point Road which is a narrow eight-mile dirt road on Hurricane Ridge. The road ends below the south slope of Obstruction Peak, and a short hike leads to the summit. The nearest higher peak is Elk Mountain, 0.46 mi (0.74 km) to the northeast. Obstruction Peak is a major triple divide point such that precipitation runoff drains into tributaries of the Elwha River, Dungeness River, and Morse Creek. All three thence empty into the Strait of Juan de Fuca.

== Climate ==
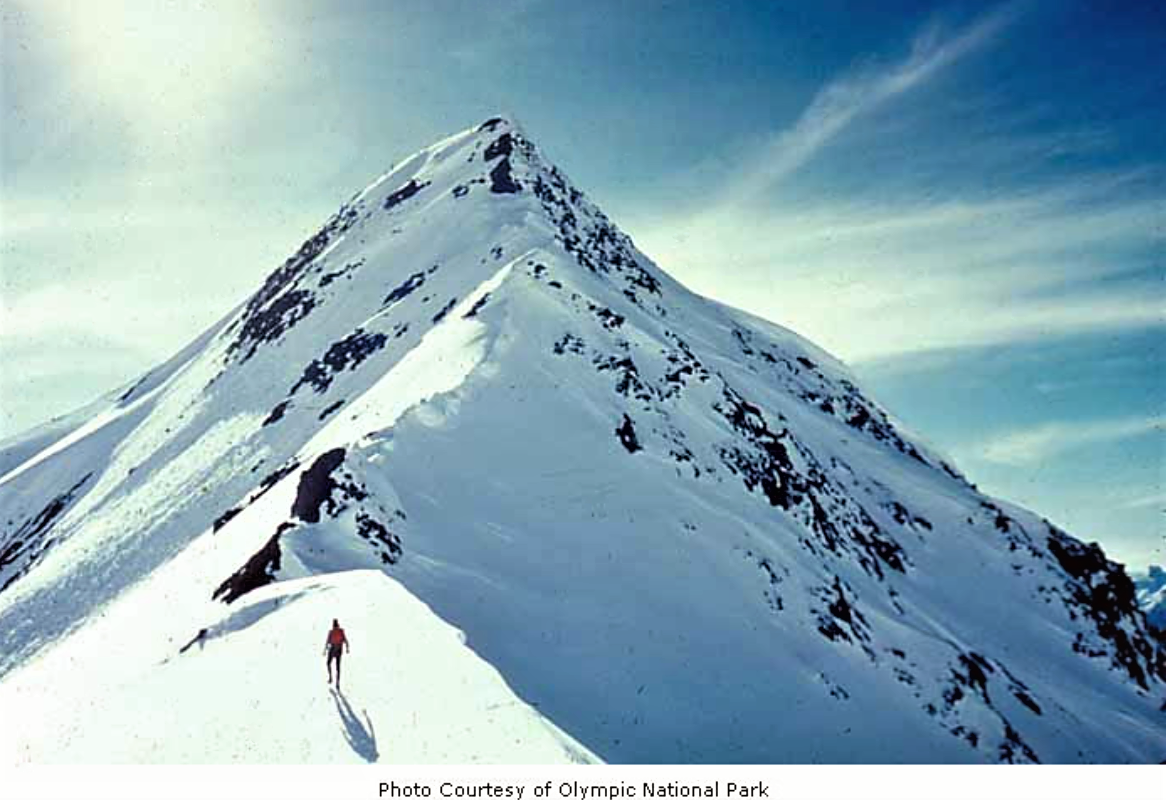
Northeast aspect

Set in the north-central portion of the Olympic Mountains, Obstruction Peak is located in the marine west coast climate zone of western North America. Weather fronts originating in the Pacific Ocean travel northeast toward the Olympic Mountains. As fronts approach, they are forced upward by the peaks (orographic lift), causing them to drop their moisture in the form of rain or snow. As a result, the Olympics experience high precipitation, especially during the winter months in the form of snowfall. Because of maritime influence, snow tends to be wet and heavy, resulting in avalanche danger. During winter months weather is usually cloudy, but due to high pressure systems over the Pacific Ocean that intensify during summer months, there is often little or no cloud cover during the summer. The months of July through September offer the most favorable weather for viewing or climbing this peak.

== History ==
It's believed that a road-building project in the 1940s was expected to run a full-circle loop from the Elwha River to Hurricane Ridge and Deer Park, then on to Port Angeles. The project was stopped at Obstruction Point because of loose shale and inherent instability of the slopes here, hence the obstruction.
