= Kitling Peak =

Mountain in Washington (state), United States

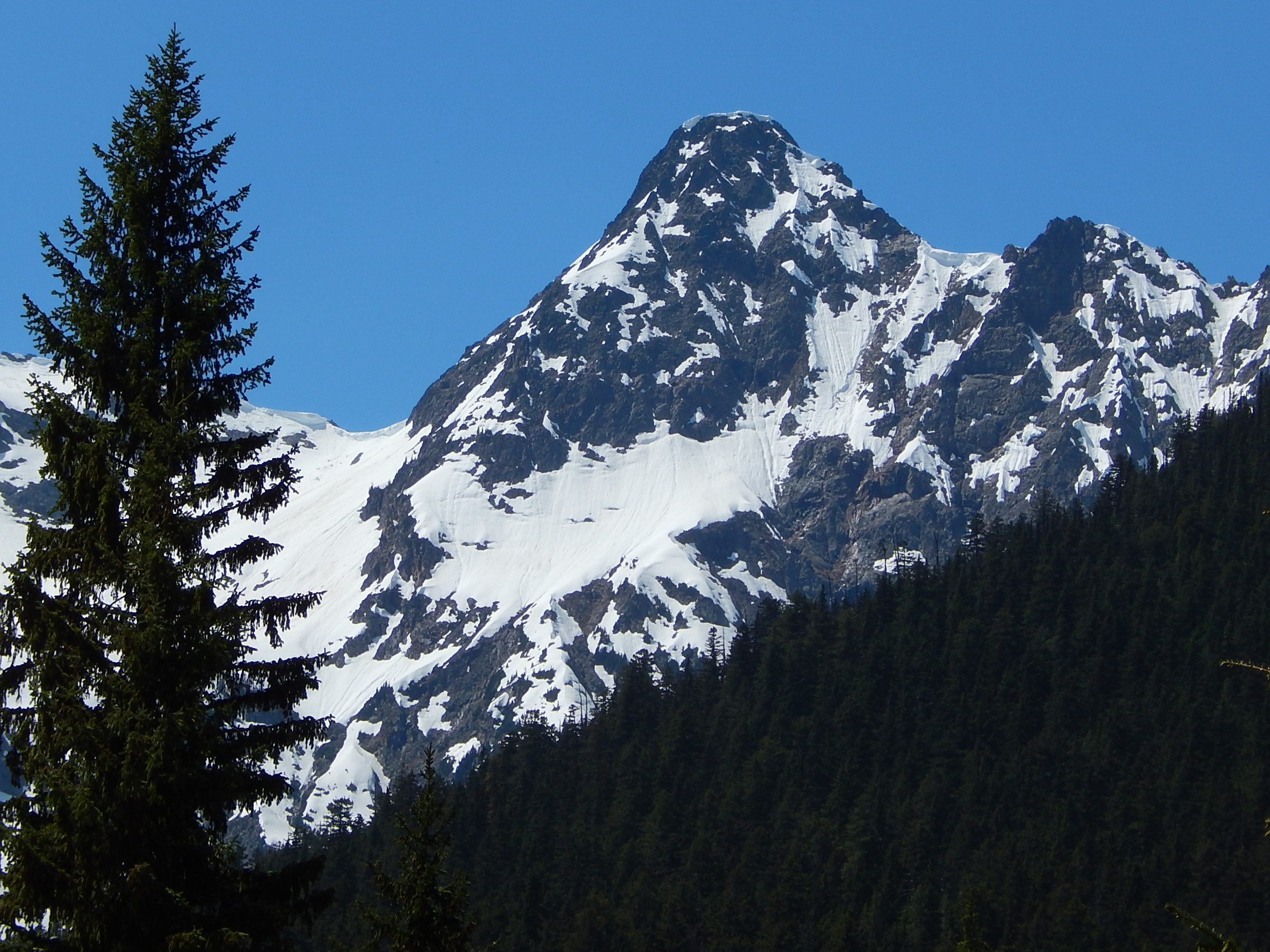
- Kitling Peak seen from the North Cascades Highway

Highest point
- Elevation: 8,003 ft (2,439 m)
- Prominence: 523 ft (160 m)
- Parent peak: Mesahchie Peak (8,795 ft)
- Isolation: 0.54 mi (0.87 km)
- Coordinates: 48°34′56″N 120°51′24″W

Geography
- Location within Washington (state) Location within the United States
- Interactive map of Kitling Peak
- Country: United States
- State: Washington
- County: Skagit
- Protected area: North Cascades National Park; Stephen Mather Wilderness
- Parent range: North Cascades; Cascade Range
- Topo map: USGS Mount Arriva

Climbing
- First ascent: August 24, 1968, John Roper, Chris Roper
- Easiest route: Scrambling

Kitling Peak is an 8,003-foot (2,439-metre) mountain summit in the North Cascades in the U.S. state of Washington. It is located one mile northwest of Easy Pass on the borders of the Stephen Mather Wilderness and North Cascades National Park. Kitling Peak is situated at the east end of Ragged Ridge. Other peaks on Ragged Ridge include Mesahchie Peak, Kimtah Peak, Katsuk Peak, and Graybeard Peak. The nearest higher peak is Mesahchie Peak, 0.95 miles (1.53 km) to the south. The Mesahchie Glacier on Kitling's northwest slope forms the headwaters of Panther Creek. Precipitation runoff on the east side of the mountain drains into Ross Lake via Granite Creek, whereas the west side of the peak drains into Diablo Lake via Panther Creek and Fisher Creek. Topographic relief is significant as the summit rises 3,000 feet (910 meters) above Fisher Creek in one mile (1.6 km) and the northeast slope rises 3,400 feet (1,000 meters) above Kitling Creek in 0.75 mile (1.2 km). The mountain's name "Kitling" derives from Chinook Jargon "ketling" which means kettle. The mountain takes its name from Kitling Lake which is one mile north of the peak. The toponym was officially adopted in 1969 by the U.S. Board on Geographic Names.

== Climate ==
Kitling Peak is located in the marine west coast climate zone of western North America. Most weather fronts originating in the Pacific Ocean travel northeast toward the Cascade Mountains. As fronts approach the North Cascades, they are forced upward by the peaks of the Cascade Range (orographic lift), causing them to drop their moisture in the form of rain or snowfall onto the Cascades. As a result, the west side of the North Cascades experiences high precipitation, especially during the winter months in the form of snowfall. Because of maritime influence, snow tends to be wet and heavy, resulting in high avalanche danger. During winter months, weather is usually cloudy, but due to high pressure systems over the Pacific Ocean that intensify during summer months, there is often little or no cloud cover during the summer.

== Geology ==
The North Cascades features some of the most rugged topography in the Cascade Range with craggy peaks, spires, ridges, and deep glacial valleys. Geological events occurring many years ago created the diverse topography and drastic elevation changes over the Cascade Range leading to the various climate differences.

The history of the formation of the Cascade Mountains dates back millions of years ago to the late Eocene Epoch. With the North American Plate overriding the Pacific Plate, episodes of volcanic igneous activity persisted. In addition, small fragments of the oceanic and continental lithosphere called terranes created the North Cascades about 50 million years ago.

During the Pleistocene period dating back over two million years ago, glaciation advancing and retreating repeatedly scoured the landscape leaving deposits of rock debris. The U-shaped cross section of the river valleys is a result of recent glaciation. Uplift and faulting in combination with glaciation have been the dominant processes which have created the tall peaks and deep valleys of the North Cascades area.

== See also ==
- Geography of the North Cascades
- Geology of the Pacific Northwest
