= Blackbeard Peak =

Mountain in Washington (state), United States

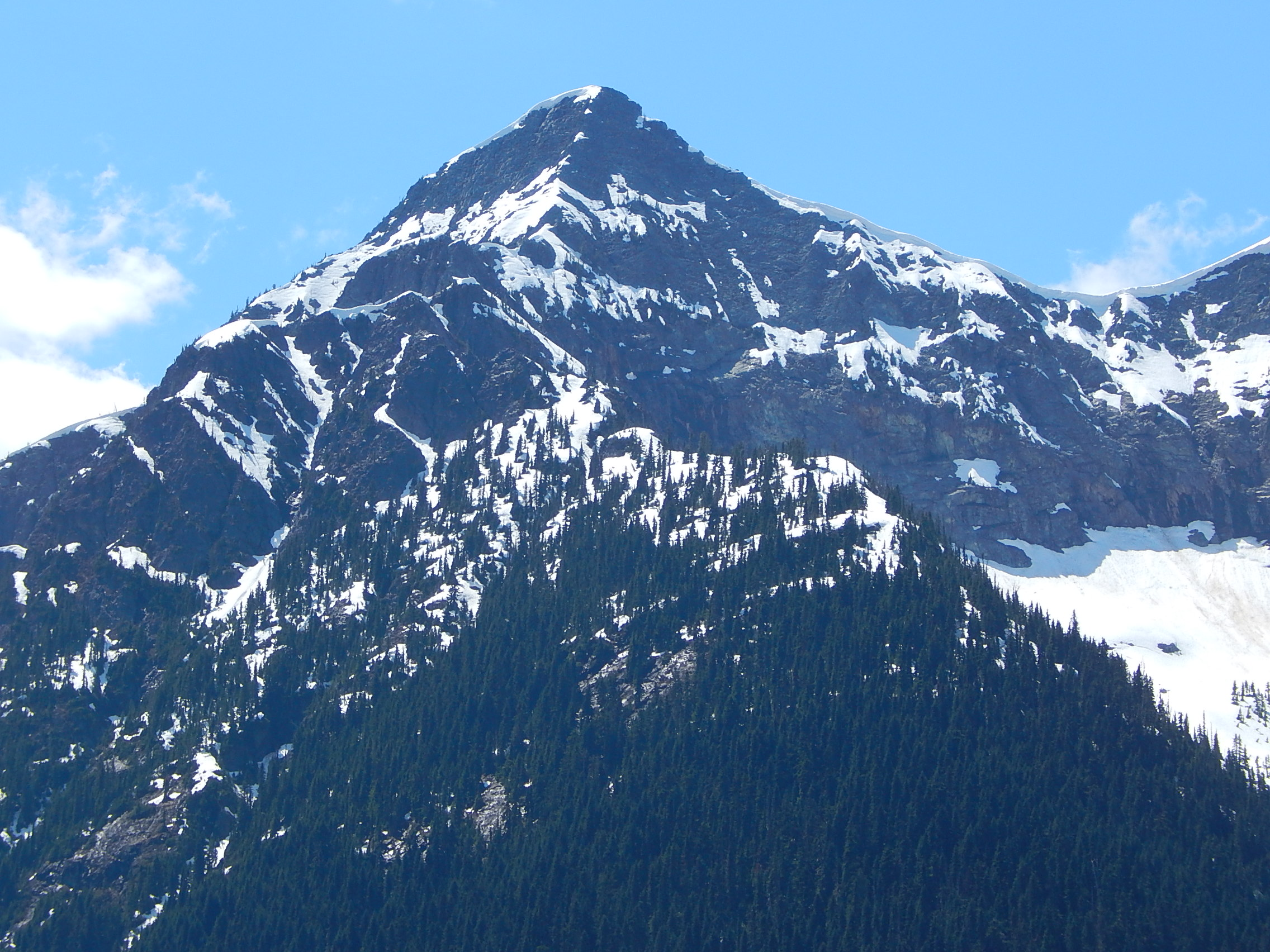
- Blackbeard Peak seen from the northeast on the North Cascades Highway

Highest point
- Elevation: 7,241 ft (2,207 m)
- Prominence: 361 ft (110 m)
- Parent peak: Repulse Peak
- Isolation: 1.51 mi (2.43 km)
- Coordinates: 48°32′09″N 120°47′08″W

Geography
- Location within Washington (state) Location within the United States
- Interactive map of Blackbeard Peak
- Country: United States
- State: Washington
- County: Skagit
- Parent range: North Cascades
- Topo map: USGS Mount Arriva

Climbing
- Easiest route: Scrambling

Blackbeard Peak, also spelled Black Beard Peak, is a 7,241-foot (2,207 m) mountain summit in the North Cascades in the U.S. state of Washington. It is located in the Okanogan–Wenatchee National Forest in Skagit County. It is situated northwest of Rainy Pass, southwest of Porcupine Peak, and southeast of Graybeard Peak. Its nearest higher neighbor is Repulse Peak, 1.06 mi (1.71 km) to the west. Blackbeard Peak can be seen from the North Cascades Highway. Precipitation runoff from Blackbeard Peak drains into Granite Creek, a tributary of the Skagit River. Topographic relief is significant as the summit rises over 3,000 feet (910 meters) above Granite Creek in one mile (1.6 km).

== Climate ==
Most weather fronts originating in the Pacific Ocean travel northeast toward the Cascade Mountains. As fronts approach the North Cascades, they are forced upward by the peaks of the Cascade Range (orographic lift), causing them to drop their moisture in the form of rain or snowfall onto the Cascades. As a result, the west side of the North Cascades experiences high precipitation, especially during the winter months in the form of snowfall. Because of maritime influence, snow tends to be wet and heavy, resulting in high avalanche danger. During winter months, weather is usually cloudy, but due to high pressure systems over the Pacific Ocean that intensify during summer months, there is often little or no cloud cover during the summer.

== Geology ==
The North Cascades features some of the most rugged topography in the Cascade Range with craggy peaks and ridges and deep glacial valleys. Geological events occurring many years ago created the diverse topography and drastic elevation changes over the Cascade Range leading to the various climate differences. These climate differences lead to vegetation variety defining the ecoregions in this area.

The history of the formation of the Cascade Mountains dates back millions of years ago to the late Eocene Epoch. With the North American Plate overriding the Pacific Plate, episodes of volcanic igneous activity persisted. In addition, small fragments of the oceanic and continental lithosphere called terranes created the North Cascades about 50 million years ago.

During the Pleistocene period dating back over two million years ago, glaciation advancing and retreating repeatedly scoured the landscape leaving deposits of rock debris. The U-shaped cross section of the river valleys is a result of recent glaciation. Uplift and faulting in combination with glaciation have been the dominant processes which have created the tall peaks and deep valleys of the North Cascades area.

== Gallery ==
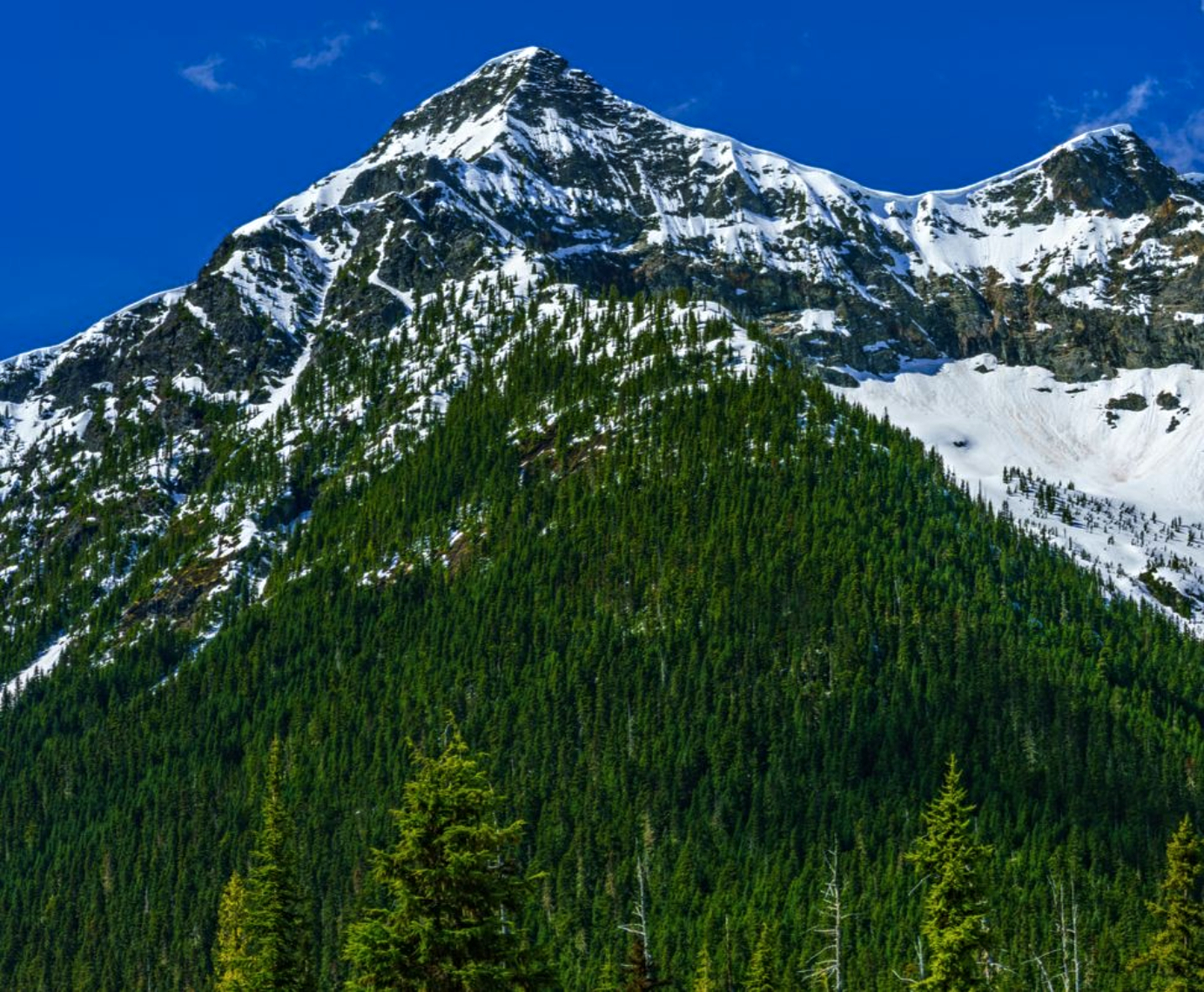
Blackbeard Peak from northeast

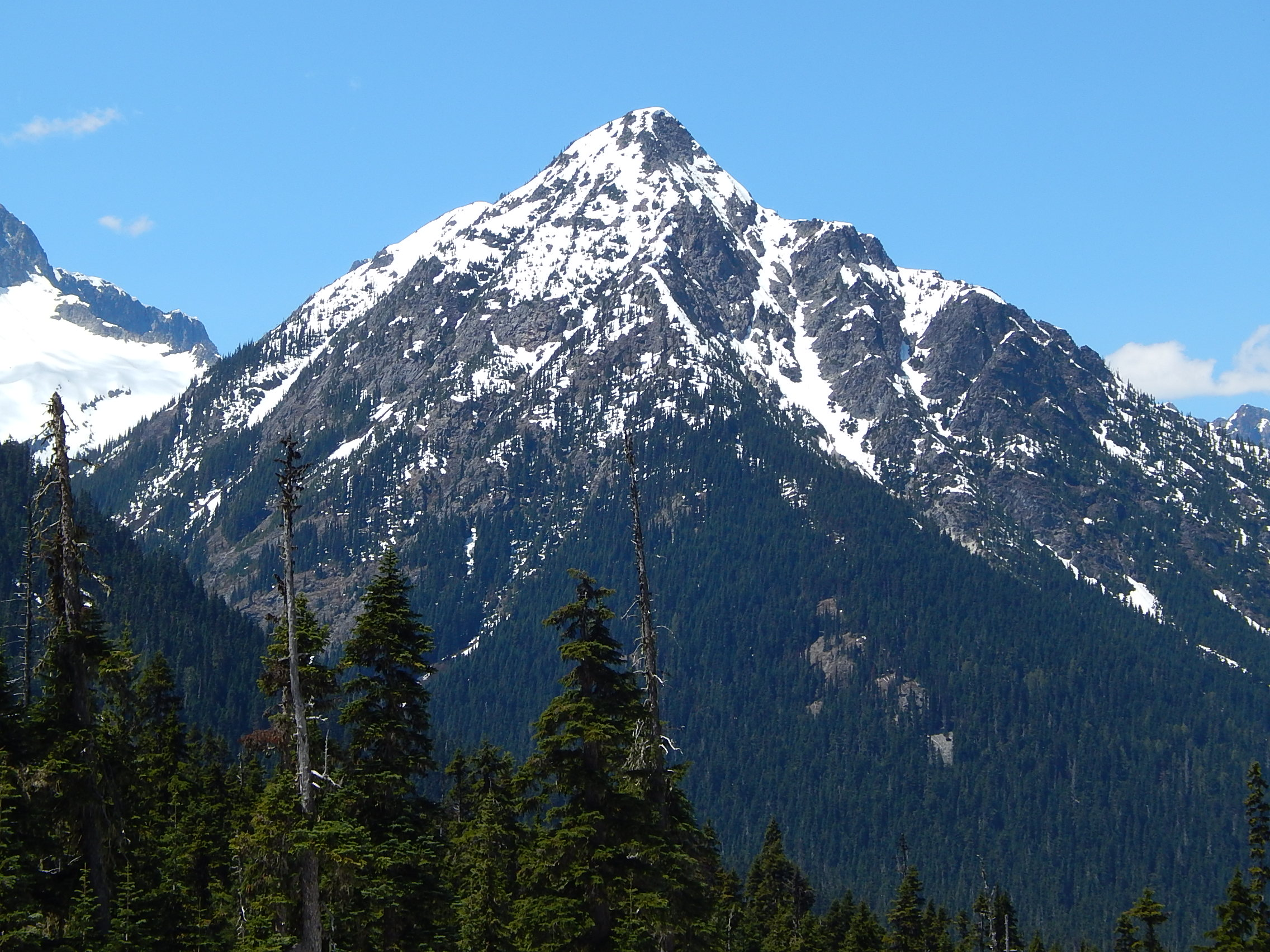
Blackbeard seen from the east

== See also ==
- Geography of the North Cascades
- Geology of the Pacific Northwest
