= Fisher Peak (Washington) =

Mountain in Washington (state), United States

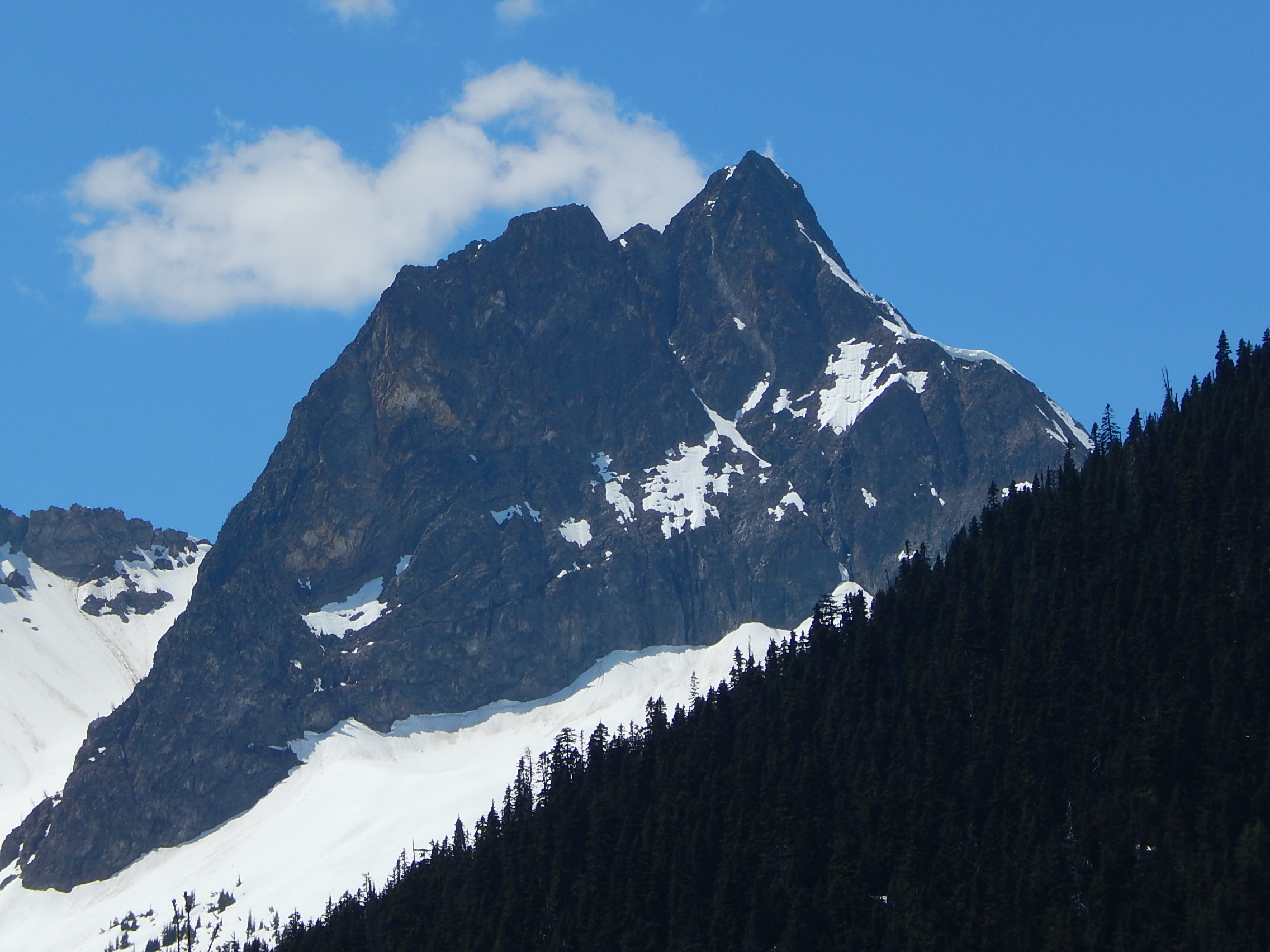
- Fisher Peak seen from the North Cascades Highway

Highest point
- Elevation: 8,087 ft (2,465 m)
- Prominence: 835 ft (255 m)
- Parent peak: Mount Arriva (8,215 ft)
- Isolation: 1.02 mi (1.64 km)
- Coordinates: 48°32′43″N 120°49′26″W

Geography
- Location within Washington (state) Location within the United States
- Interactive map of Fisher Peak
- Country: United States
- State: Washington
- County: Chelan / Skagit
- Protected area: North Cascades National Park; Stephen Mather Wilderness
- Parent range: North Cascades; Cascade Range
- Topo map: USGS Mount Arriva

Geology
- Rock age: Late Cretaceous
- Rock type: Tonalitic pluton

Climbing
- First ascent: 1940, Fred Beckey, Jim Crooks, Ed Kennedy
- Easiest route: Scrambling

Fisher Peak is an 8,087-foot-elevation (2,465-meter) mountain summit located in the North Cascades of Washington state. It is situated on the boundaries of the Stephen Mather Wilderness and North Cascades National Park, midway between Black Peak and Easy Pass, and adjacent to Repulse Peak. Precipitation runoff from Fisher Peak's north and east slopes drains to Fisher Creek and Granite Creek which flow to the Skagit River, whereas the west slope drains into tributaries of the Stehekin River. Topographic relief is significant as the east aspect rises approximately 2,100 feet (640 meters) in less than one-half mile (0.8 km). The mountain's toponym has been officially adopted by the United States Board on Geographic Names.

== Climate ==
Fisher Peak is located in the marine west coast climate zone of western North America. Weather fronts originating in the Pacific Ocean travel northeast toward the Cascade Mountains. As fronts approach the North Cascades, they are forced upward by the peaks of the Cascade Range (orographic lift), causing them to drop their moisture in the form of rain or snowfall onto the Cascades. As a result, the west side of the North Cascades experiences high precipitation, especially during the winter months in the form of snowfall. Because of maritime influence, snow tends to be wet and heavy, resulting in high avalanche danger. During winter months, weather is usually cloudy, but due to high pressure systems over the Pacific Ocean that intensify during summer months, there is often little or no cloud cover during the summer.

== Geology ==
The North Cascades features some of the most rugged topography in the Cascade Range with craggy peaks, ridges, and deep glacial valleys. Geological events occurring many years ago created the diverse topography and drastic elevation changes over the Cascade Range leading to the various climate differences. These climate differences lead to vegetation variety defining the ecoregions in this area.

The history of the formation of the Cascade Mountains dates back millions of years ago to the late Eocene Epoch. With the North American Plate overriding the Pacific Plate, episodes of volcanic igneous activity persisted. In addition, small fragments of the oceanic and continental lithosphere called terranes created the North Cascades about 50 million years ago.

During the Pleistocene period dating back over two million years ago, glaciation advancing and retreating repeatedly scoured the landscape leaving deposits of rock debris. The U-shaped cross section of the river valleys is a result of recent glaciation. Uplift and faulting in combination with glaciation have been the dominant processes which have created the tall peaks and deep valleys of the North Cascades area.

== Gallery ==
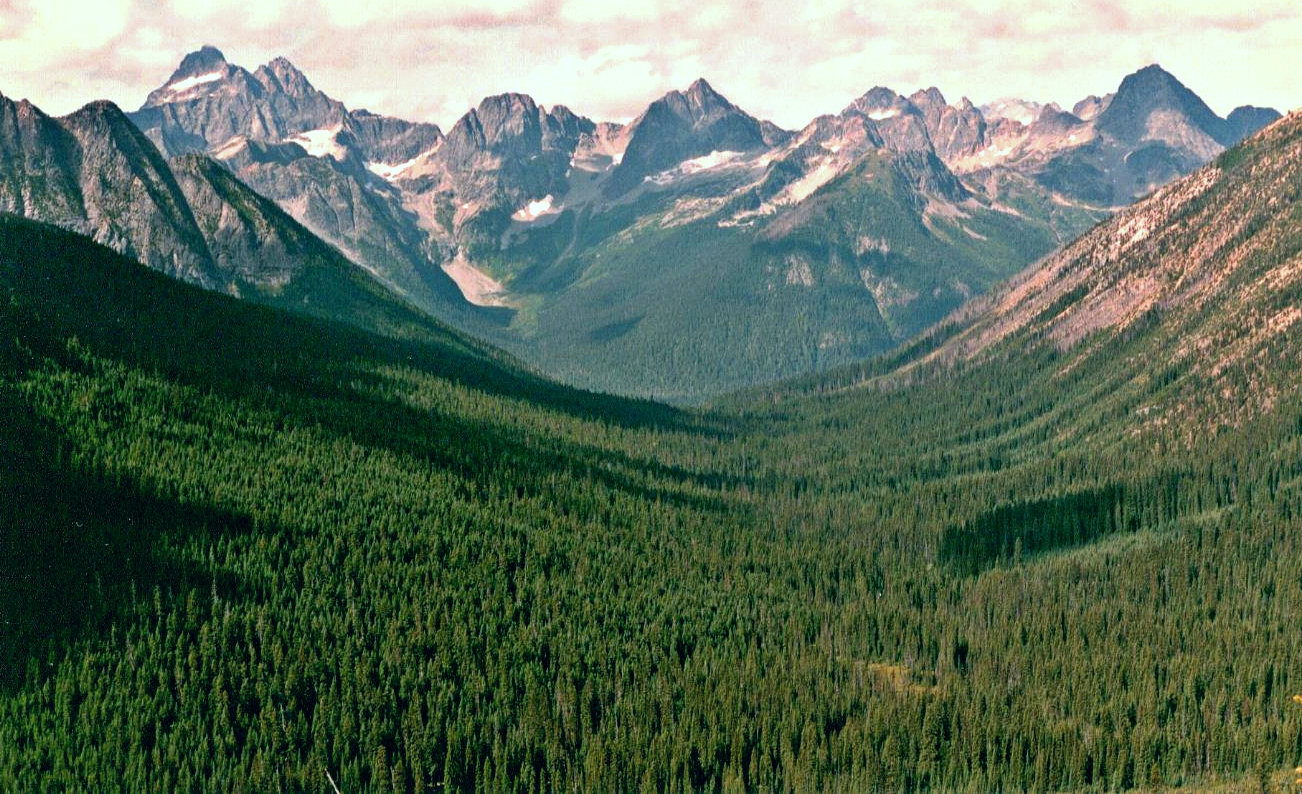
Fisher Peak (center) with Black Peak (left) and Graybeard Peak (right) seen from the Pacific Crest Trail above Swamp Creek

== See also ==
- Geography of the North Cascades
- Geology of the Pacific Northwest
