= Red Mountain (Skagit County, Washington) =

Mountain in Washington (state), United States

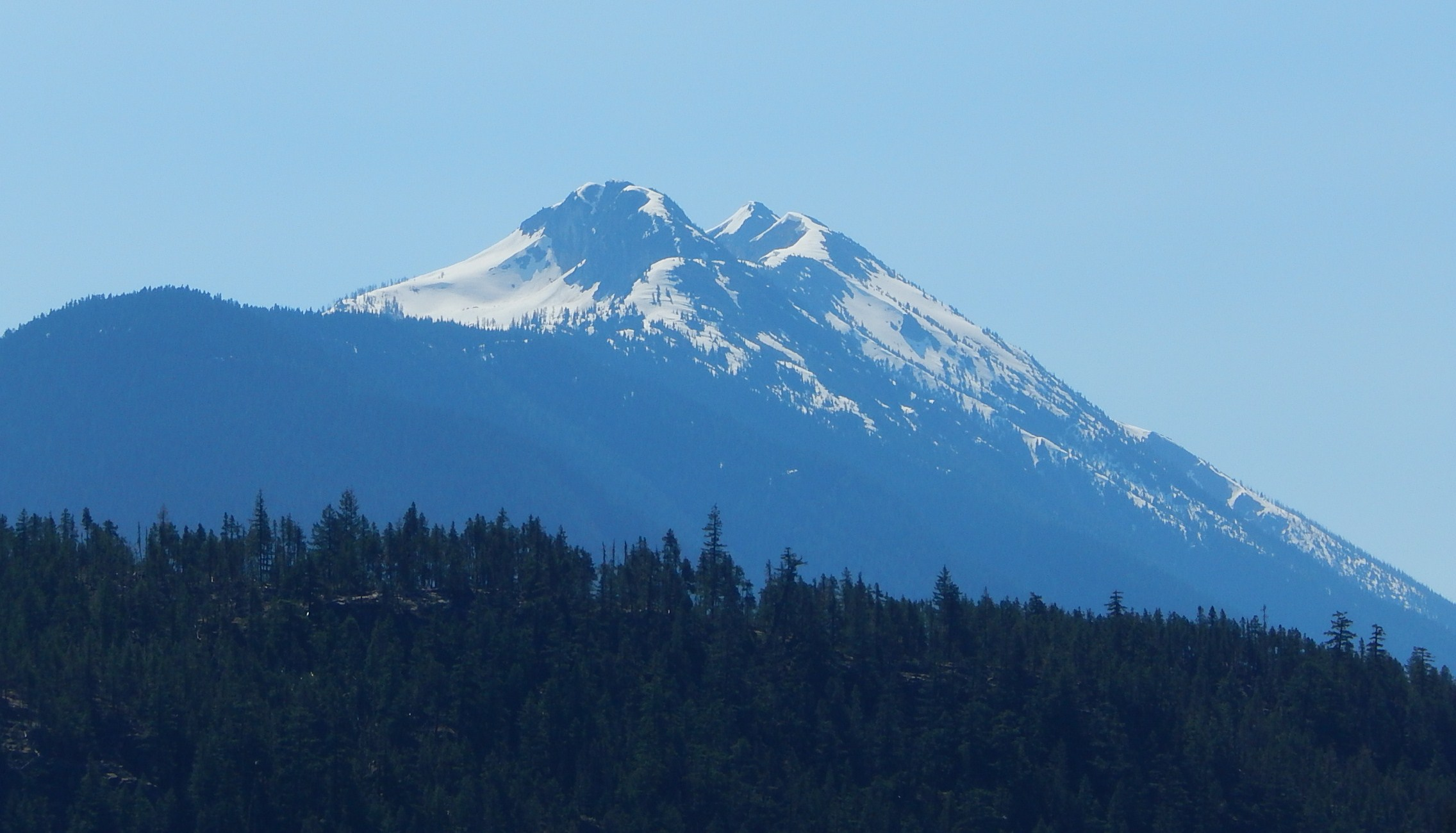
- Red Mountain seen from Diablo Lake

Highest point
- Elevation: 7,662 ft (2,335 m) NAVD 88
- Prominence: 618 ft (188 m)
- Parent peak: Cosho Peak
- Isolation: 2.83 mi (4.55 km)
- Coordinates: 48°36′02″N 120°59′14″W

Geography
- Location within Washington (state) Location within the United States
- Interactive map of Red Mountain
- Country: United States
- State: Washington
- County: Skagit
- Protected area: North Cascades National Park; Stephen Mather Wilderness
- Topo map: USGS Mount Logan

Climbing
- Easiest route: Scrambling

Red Mountain is a 7,662-foot (2,335-metre) summit in the North Cascades of Washington, United States. It is located in Skagit County, within North Cascades National Park and the Stephen Mather Wilderness. It is situated on a smooth ridge of brick-red color at the western culmination of Ragged Ridge. The nearest higher peak is Cosho Peak, 2.6 miles (4.2 km) to the east-southeast.

Like many peaks of the North Cascades, Red Mountain is more notable for its large, steep rise above local terrain than for its absolute elevation. Topographic relief is significant as the summit rises 4,260 feet (1,298 meters) above Fisher Creek in 1.5 miles (2.4 km). Precipitation runoff from Red Mountain drains to the Skagit River via Panther and Fisher Creeks.

== Climate ==
Red Mountain is located in the marine west coast climate zone of western North America. Weather fronts originating in the Pacific Ocean move northeast toward the Cascade Mountains. As fronts approach the North Cascades, they are forced upward by the peaks of the Cascade Range (orographic lift), causing them to drop their moisture in the form of rain or snowfall onto the Cascades. As a result, the west side of the North Cascades experiences high precipitation, especially during the winter months in the form of snowfall. Because of maritime influence, snow tends to be wet and heavy, resulting in avalanche danger. During winter months, the weather is usually cloudy, but due to high-pressure systems over the Pacific Ocean that intensify during summer months, there is often little or no cloud cover during the summer. Due to its temperate climate and proximity to the Pacific Ocean, areas west of the Cascade Crest very rarely experience temperatures below 0 °F (−18 °C) or above 80 °F (27 °C).

== Geology ==
The North Cascades features some of the most rugged topography in the Cascade Range with craggy peaks, ridges, and deep glacial valleys. Geological events occurring many years ago created the diverse topography and drastic elevation changes over the Cascade Range leading to the various climate differences. These climate differences lead to vegetation variety, defining the ecoregions in this area.

The formation of the Cascade Mountains traces back millions of years to the late Eocene Epoch.. With the North American Plate overriding the Pacific Plate, episodes of volcanic igneous activity persisted. In addition, small fragments of the oceanic and continental lithosphere called terranes created the North Cascades about 50 million years ago.

During the Pleistocene period, dating back over two million years ago, glaciation advancing and retreating repeatedly scoured the landscape, leaving deposits of rock debris. The U-shaped cross-section of the river valleys is a result of recent glaciation. Uplift and faulting in combination with glaciation have been the dominant processes which have created the tall peaks and deep valleys of the North Cascades area.
