= Red Face Mountain =

Mountain in Washington, United States

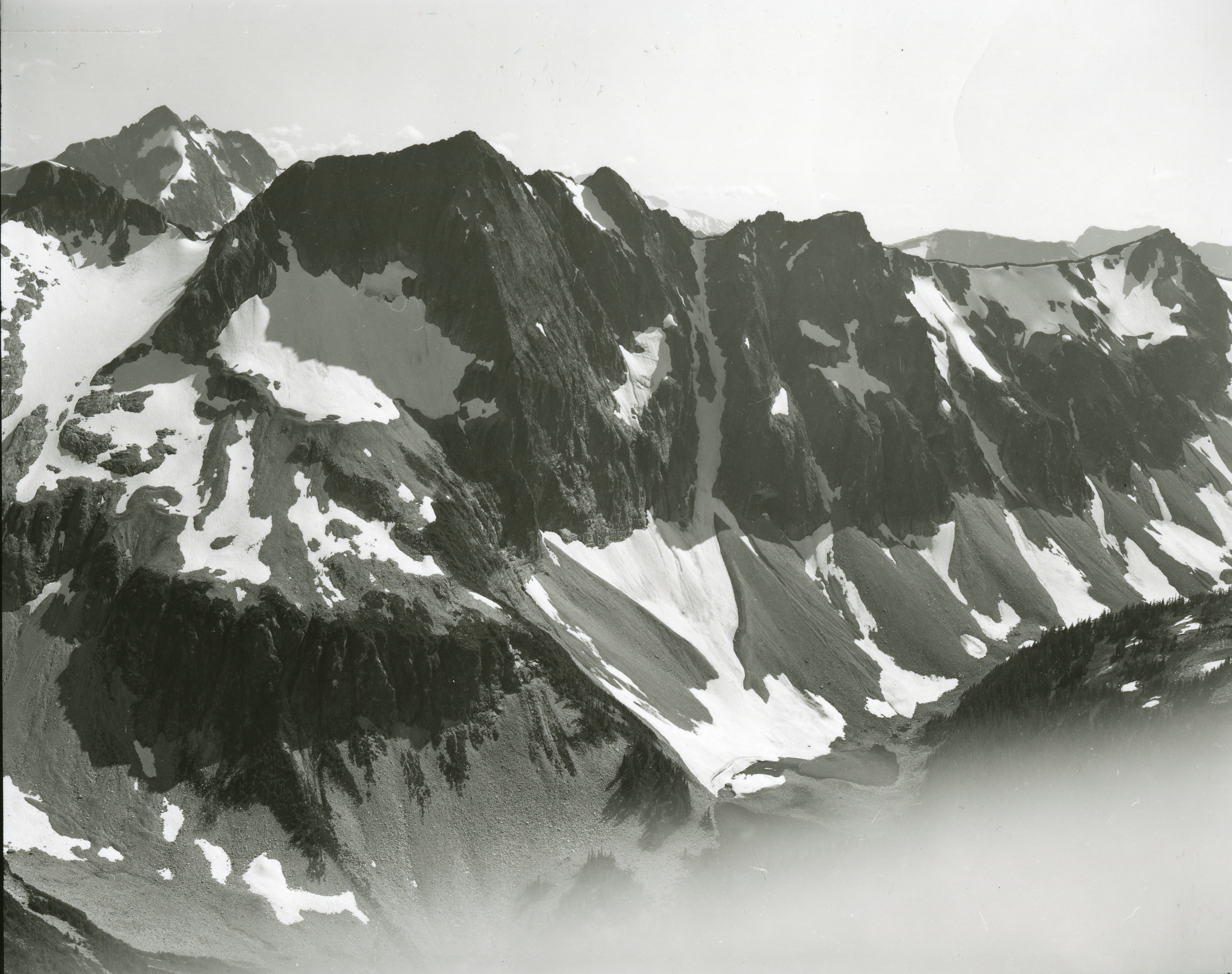
- North aspect (Whatcom Peak behind, upper left corner)

Highest point
- Elevation: 7,141 ft (2,177 m)
- Prominence: 1,361 ft (415 m)
- Parent peak: Whatcom Peak (7,574 ft)
- Isolation: 2.3 mi (3.7 km)
- Coordinates: 48°53′26″N 121°22′05″W

Geography
- Location within Washington (state) Location within the United States
- Interactive map of Red Face Mountain
- Country: United States
- State: Washington
- County: Whatcom
- Protected area: North Cascades National Park; Stephen Mather Wilderness
- Parent range: Skagit Range; North Cascades; Cascade Range
- Topo map: USGS Mount Redoubt

Climbing
- Easiest route: Scrambling

Red Face Mountain is a 7,141-foot-elevation (2,177-meter) summit in Whatcom County of Washington state.

== Description ==
Red Face Mountain is situated seven miles (11 km) south of the Canada–United States border in North Cascades National Park, in the Skagit Range of the North Cascades. The nearest higher neighbor is Whatcom Peak, 2.29 mi (3.69 km) to the south and Indian Mountain rises 1.14 mi (1.83 km) to the west-northwest. Precipitation runoff from the north slope drains into Lake Reveille then Indian Creek, whereas the south slope drains into Tapto Lakes then Brush Creek. Both creeks are tributaries of the Chilliwack River. Although modest in elevation, topographic relief is significant as the summit rises 3,800 feet (1,200 meters) above Indian Creek Valley in 1.5 mile and 2,100 feet (640 meters) above Lake Reveille in 0.4 mile. The mountain's descriptive name refers to a large zone of iron oxide-stained rock at the top of the mountain, and the toponym has been officially adopted by the U.S. Board on Geographic Names.

== Climate ==
Red Face Mountain is located in the marine west coast climate zone of western North America. Most weather fronts originate in the Pacific Ocean, and travel northeast toward the Cascade Mountains. As fronts approach the North Cascades, they are forced upward by the peaks of the Cascade Range, causing them to drop their moisture in the form of rain or snowfall onto the Cascades. As a result, the west side of the North Cascades experiences high precipitation, especially during the winter months in the form of snowfall. During winter months, weather is usually cloudy, but, due to high pressure systems over the Pacific Ocean that intensify during summer months, there is often little or no cloud cover during the summer. Because of maritime influence, snow tends to be wet and heavy, resulting in high avalanche danger. The months July through September offer the most favorable weather for viewing or climbing this peak.

== Geology ==
The North Cascades features some of the most rugged topography in the Cascade Range with craggy peaks, ridges, and deep glacial valleys. Geological events occurring many years ago created the diverse topography and drastic elevation changes over the Cascade Range leading to various climate differences.

The history of the formation of the Cascade Mountains dates back millions of years ago to the late Eocene Epoch. With the North American Plate overriding the Pacific Plate, episodes of volcanic igneous activity persisted. In addition, small fragments of the oceanic and continental lithosphere called terranes created the North Cascades about 50 million years ago.

During the Pleistocene period dating back over two million years ago, glaciation advancing and retreating repeatedly scoured and shaped the landscape. The U-shaped cross section of the river valleys is a result of recent glaciation. Uplift and faulting in combination with glaciation have been the dominant processes which have created the tall peaks and deep valleys of the North Cascades area.

== See also ==
- Geography of the North Cascades
