= Graybeard Peak =

Mountain in Washington (state), United States

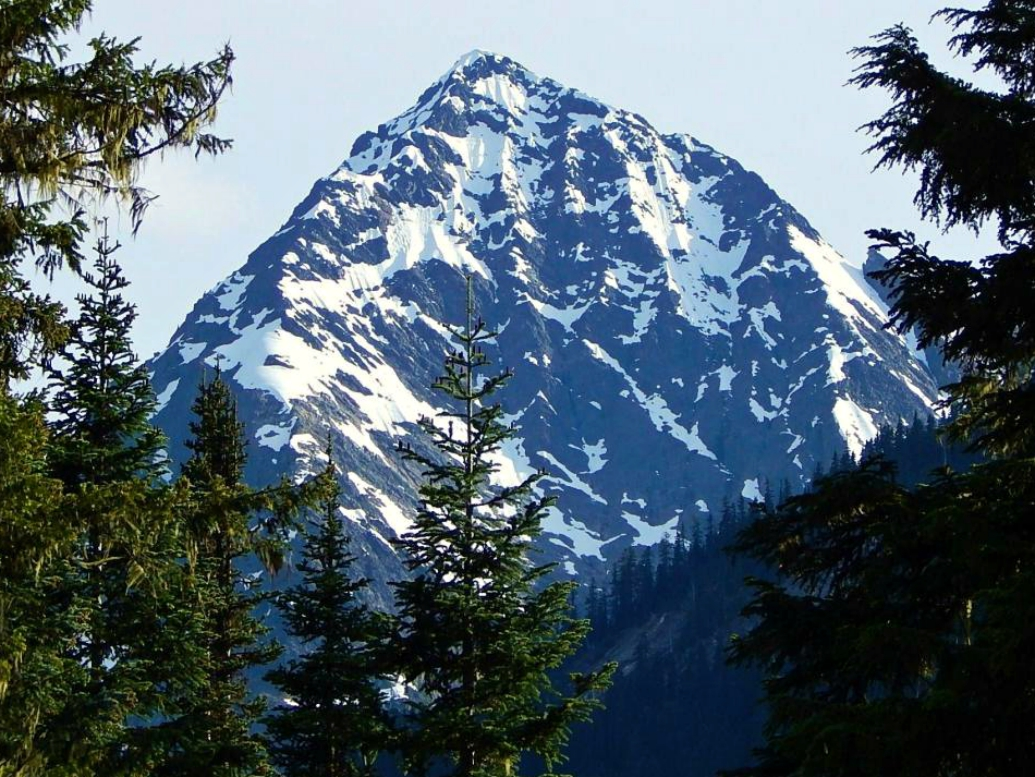
- Graybeard Peak

Highest point
- Elevation: 7,965 ft (2,428 m)
- Prominence: 1,005 ft (310 m)
- Parent peak: Fisher Peak (8,040 ft)
- Isolation: 1.34 mi (2.16 km)
- Coordinates: 48°33.52′N 120°49.32′W

Geography
- Location within Washington (state) Location within the United States
- Interactive map of Graybeard Peak
- Country: United States
- State: Washington
- County: Skagit
- Protected area: North Cascades National Park
- Parent range: Cascade Range
- Topo map: USGS Mount Arriva

Climbing
- First ascent: 1959 by Carl Ben Casey, William Long
- Easiest route: class 3

Graybeard Peak is a 7,965-foot (2,428-metre) mountain summit located in Skagit County, Washington.

== Description ==
Graybeard Peak is part of the North Cascades Range. Graybeard Peak straddles the North Cascades National Park boundary line, and can be seen from the North Cascades Highway at the Easy Pass Trailhead. Graybeard Peak is situated on Ragged Ridge. Other peaks on Ragged Ridge include Mesahchie Peak, Kimtah Peak, and Katsuk Peak. The nearest higher peak is Fisher Peak, 1.33 miles (2.14 km) to the south. Precipitation runoff on the east side of the mountain drains into Ross Lake via Granite Creek, whereas the west side of the mountain drains into Diablo Lake via Fisher Creek.

== Climate ==
Graybeard Peak is located in the marine west coast climate zone of western North America. Most weather fronts originating in the Pacific Ocean travel northeast toward the Cascade Mountains. As fronts approach the North Cascades, they are forced upward by the peaks of the Cascade Range (orographic lift), causing them to drop their moisture in the form of rain or snowfall onto the Cascades. As a result, the west side of the North Cascades experiences high precipitation, especially during the winter months in the form of snowfall. Because of maritime influence, snow tends to be wet and heavy, resulting in high avalanche danger. During winter months, weather is usually cloudy, but, due to high pressure systems over the Pacific Ocean that intensify during summer months, there is often little or no cloud cover during the summer. Due to its temperate climate and proximity to the Pacific Ocean, areas west of the Cascade Crest very rarely experience temperatures below 0 °F (−18 °C) or above 80 °F (27 °C).

== Geology ==
The North Cascades features some of the most rugged topography in the Cascade Range with craggy peaks, ridges, and deep glacial valleys. Geological events occurring many years ago created the diverse topography and drastic elevation changes over the Cascade Range leading to the various climate differences. These climate differences lead to vegetation variety defining the ecoregions in this area.

The history of the formation of the Cascade Mountains dates back millions of years ago to the late Eocene Epoch. With the North American Plate overriding the Pacific Plate, episodes of volcanic igneous activity persisted. In addition, small fragments of the oceanic and continental lithosphere called terranes created the North Cascades about 50 million years ago.

During the Pleistocene period dating back over two million years ago, glaciation advancing and retreating repeatedly scoured the landscape leaving deposits of rock debris. The U-shaped cross section of the river valleys is a result of recent glaciation. Uplift and faulting in combination with glaciation have been the dominant processes which have created the tall peaks and deep valleys of the North Cascades area.

== Gallery ==
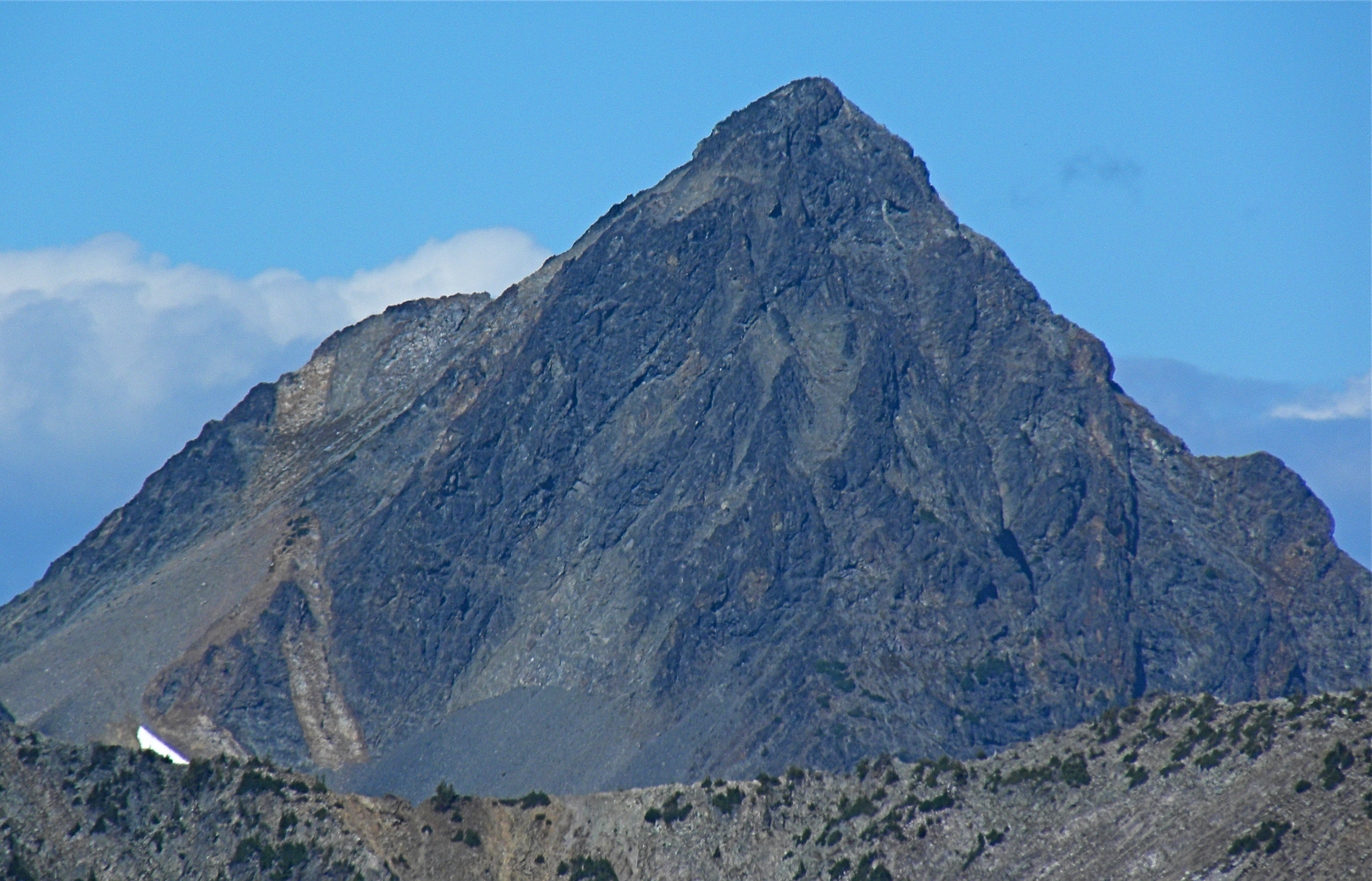
Graybeard Peak from Maple Pass loop trail

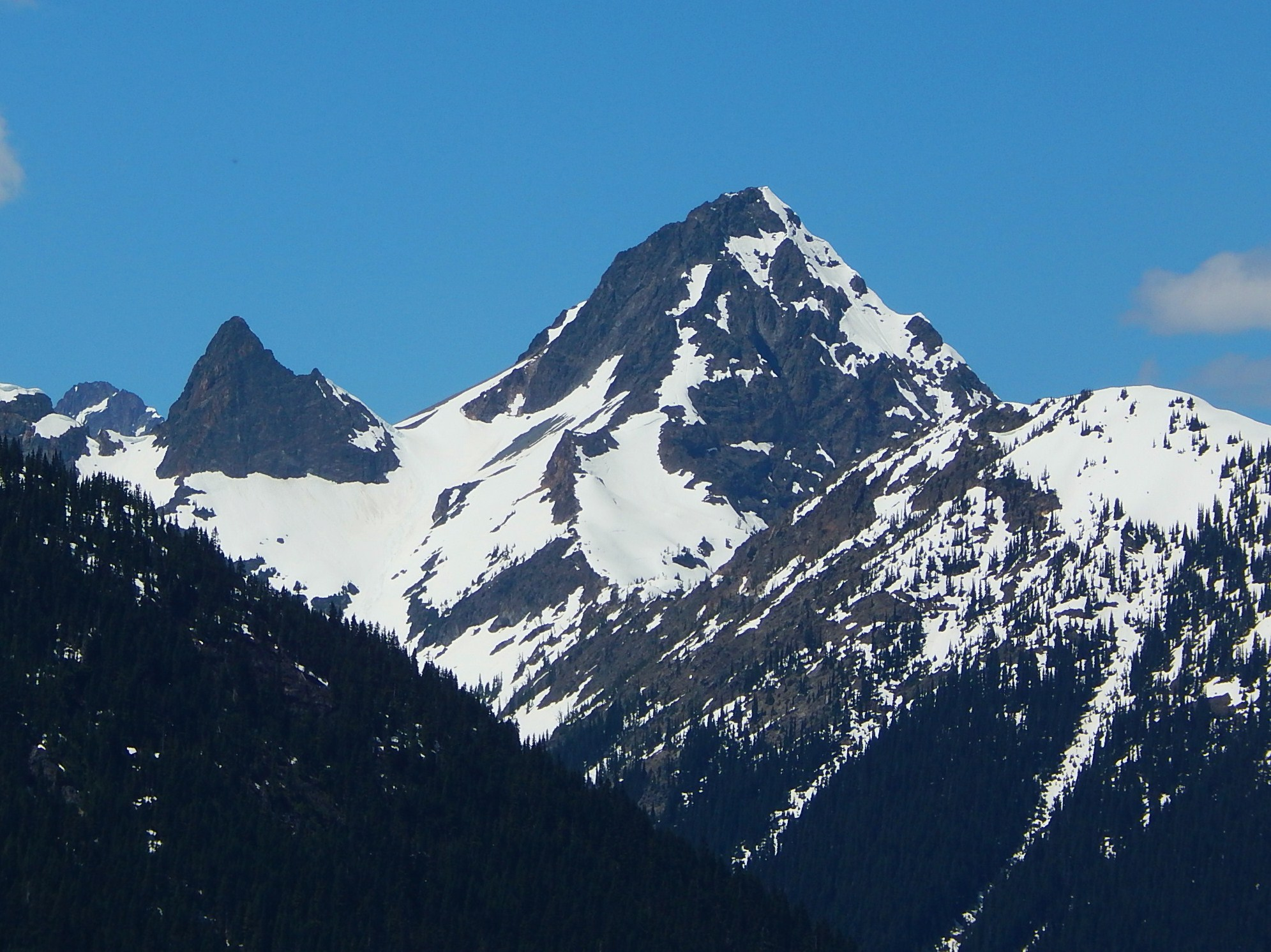
Graybeard Peak and Little Tack

== See also ==
- Geography of the North Cascades
- Geology of the Pacific Northwest
- List of mountain peaks of Washington (state)
