= Indecision Peak =

Mountain in Washington (state), United States

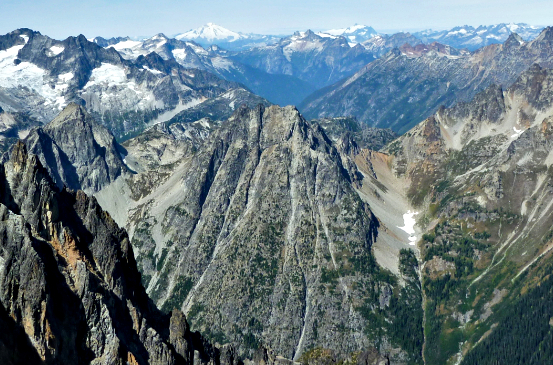
- Indecision Peak (east aspect) in bullseye, seen from Black Peak

Highest point
- Elevation: 7,945 ft (2,422 m)
- Prominence: 985 ft (300 m)
- Parent peak: Mount Arriva 8,215 ft
- Isolation: 0.93 mi (1.50 km)
- Coordinates: 48°32′09″N 120°51′32″W

Geography
- Location within Washington (state) Location within the United States
- Interactive map of Indecision Peak
- Country: United States
- State: Washington
- County: Chelan / Skagit
- Protected area: North Cascades National Park
- Parent range: North Cascades
- Topo map: USGS Mount Arriva

Climbing
- First ascent: 1972
- Easiest route: class 4 scrambling

Indecision Peak is a 7,945 ft (2,420 m) double-summit mountain located in the North Cascades in the U.S. state of Washington. It situated in North Cascades National Park, on the crest of the Cascade Range, on the shared border of Chelan County with Skagit County. Despite its position only 5 mi (8.0 km) west of the North Cascades Highway, it is not visible from any road. Its nearest higher neighbor is Mount Arriva, 0.92 mi (1.48 km) to the north. The first ascent of the summit was made August 2, 1972, by Bill Arundell, Frank King, Marilyn and Stan Jensen, and Joanne Williams. The lower northeast summit is known as Meulefire Peak (~7,930 ft), which is a portmanteau of Meulemans and Firey, the names of the first mountaineers to climb it in 1966.

== Climate ==
Indecision Peak is located in the marine west coast climate zone of western North America. This climate supports a small glacier on the northeast side of the peak. Most weather fronts coming off the Pacific Ocean travel northeast toward the Cascade Mountains. As fronts approach the North Cascades, they are forced upward by the peaks of the Cascade Range (orographic lift), causing them to drop their moisture in the form of rain or snowfall onto the Cascades. As a result, the west side of the North Cascades experiences high precipitation, especially during the winter months in the form of snowfall. Because of maritime influence, snow tends to be wet and heavy, resulting in high avalanche danger. During winter months, weather is usually cloudy, but, due to high pressure systems over the Pacific Ocean that intensify during summer months, there is often little or no cloud cover during the summer. Due to its temperate climate and proximity to the Pacific Ocean, areas west of the Cascade Crest very rarely experience temperatures below 0 °F (−18 °C) or above 80 °F (27 °C). Precipitation runoff from Indecision Peak drains into tributaries of the Stehekin and Skagit Rivers.

== Geology ==
The North Cascades features some of the most rugged topography in the Cascade Range with craggy peaks and ridges and deep glacial valleys. Geological events occurring many years ago created the diverse topography and drastic elevation changes over the Cascade Range leading to the various climate differences. These climate differences lead to vegetation variety defining the ecoregions in this area.

The history of the formation of the Cascade Mountains dates back millions of years ago to the late Eocene Epoch. With the North American Plate overriding the Pacific Plate, episodes of volcanic igneous activity persisted. In addition, small fragments of the oceanic and continental lithosphere called terranes created the North Cascades about 50 million years ago.

During the Pleistocene period dating back over two million years ago, glaciation advancing and retreating repeatedly scoured the landscape leaving deposits of rock debris. The U-shaped cross section of the river valleys is a result of recent glaciation. Uplift and faulting in combination with glaciation have been the dominant processes which have created the tall peaks and deep valleys of the North Cascades area.

== See also ==
- Geography of the North Cascades
- List of Highest Mountain Peaks in Washington
