= Indian Mountain (Washington) =

Mountain in Washington (state), United States

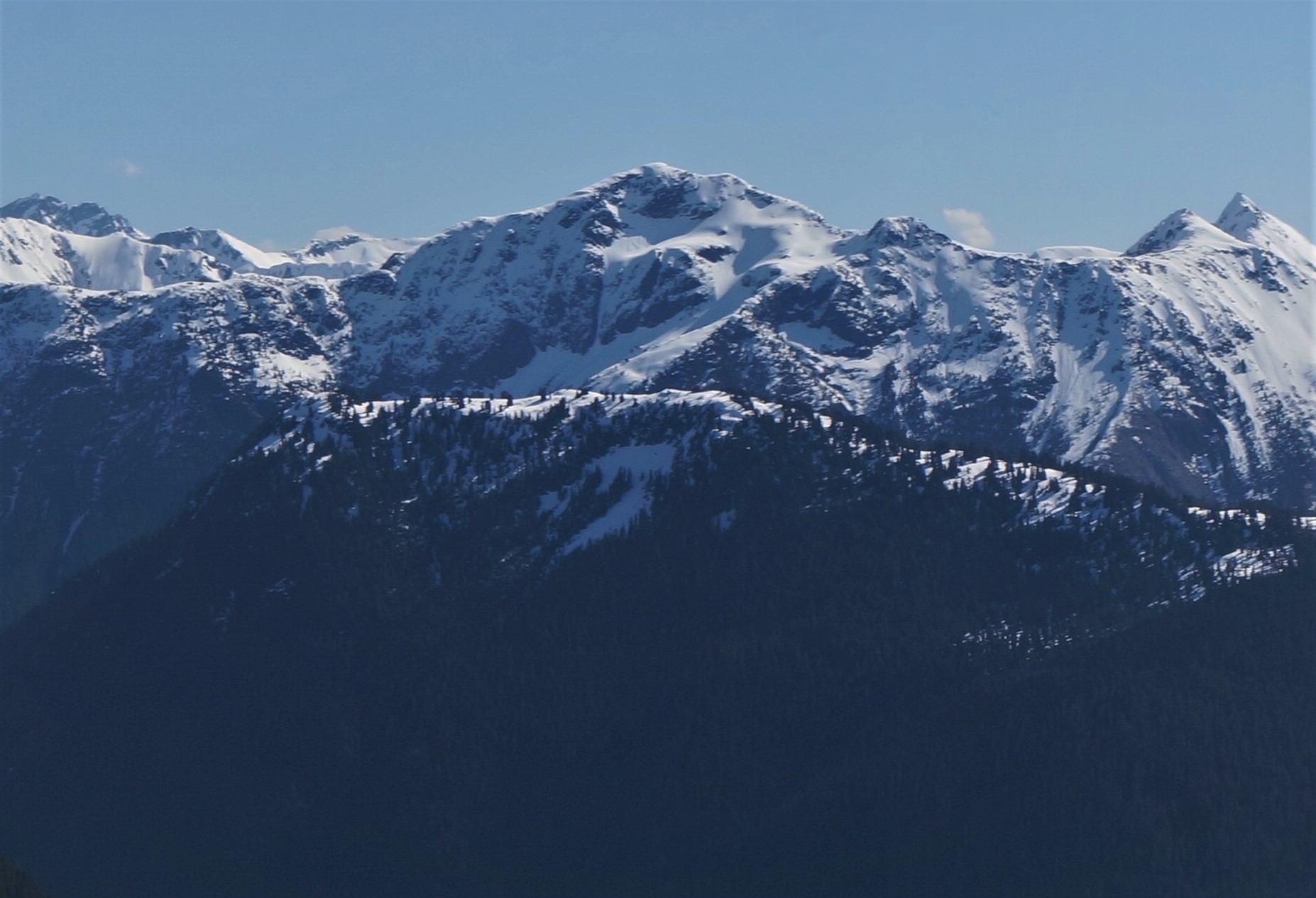
- West aspect, from Ruth Mountain (Red Face Mountain to right)

Highest point
- Elevation: 7,133 ft (2,174 m)
- Prominence: 613 ft (187 m)
- Parent peak: Red Face Mountain (7,141 ft)
- Isolation: 1.14 mi (1.83 km)
- Coordinates: 48°53′55″N 121°23′23″W

Geography
- Location within Washington (state) Location within the United States
- Interactive map of Indian Mountain
- Country: United States
- State: Washington
- County: Whatcom
- Protected area: North Cascades National Park
- Parent range: Skagit Range; North Cascades; Cascade Range
- Topo map: USGS Copper Mountain

Climbing
- Easiest route: class 2 scrambling

Indian Mountain is a remote 7,133-foot (2,174-metre) mountain summit in the Skagit Range of the North Cascades, in Whatcom County of Washington state. Indian Mountain is situated in North Cascades National Park, seven miles (11 km) south of the Canada–United States border. The nearest higher neighbor is Red Face Mountain, 1.14 mi (1.83 km) to the southeast, and Whatcom Peak rises 2.9 mi (4.7 km) to the south. Although modest in elevation, relief is significant since this peak rises over 4,100 feet above Brush Creek Valley in approximately one mile. Precipitation runoff from Indian Mountain drains into tributaries of the Chilliwack River.

== Climate ==
Indian Mountain is located in the marine west coast climate zone of western North America. Weather fronts originating in the Pacific Ocean travel northeast toward the Cascade Mountains. As fronts approach the North Cascades, they are forced upward by the peaks of the Cascade Range (orographic lift), causing them to drop their moisture in the form of rain or snowfall onto the Cascades. As a result, the west side of the North Cascades experiences high precipitation, especially during the winter months in the form of snowfall. Because of maritime influence, snow tends to be wet and heavy, resulting in high avalanche danger. During winter months, weather is usually cloudy, but due to high pressure systems over the Pacific Ocean that intensify during summer months, there is often little or no cloud cover during the summer. The months July through September offer the most favorable weather for viewing or climbing this peak.

== Geology ==
The North Cascades features some of the most rugged topography in the Cascade Range with craggy peaks, ridges, and deep glacial valleys. Geological events occurring many years ago created the diverse topography and drastic elevation changes over the Cascade Range leading to various climate differences.

The history of the formation of the Cascade Mountains dates back millions of years ago to the late Eocene Epoch. With the North American Plate overriding the Pacific Plate, episodes of volcanic igneous activity persisted. In addition, small fragments of the oceanic and continental lithosphere called terranes created the North Cascades about 50 million years ago.

During the Pleistocene period dating back over two million years ago, glaciation advancing and retreating repeatedly scoured and shaped the landscape. The U-shaped cross section of the river valleys is a result of recent glaciation. Uplift and faulting in combination with glaciation have been the dominant processes which have created the tall peaks and deep valleys of the North Cascades area.

== Gallery ==
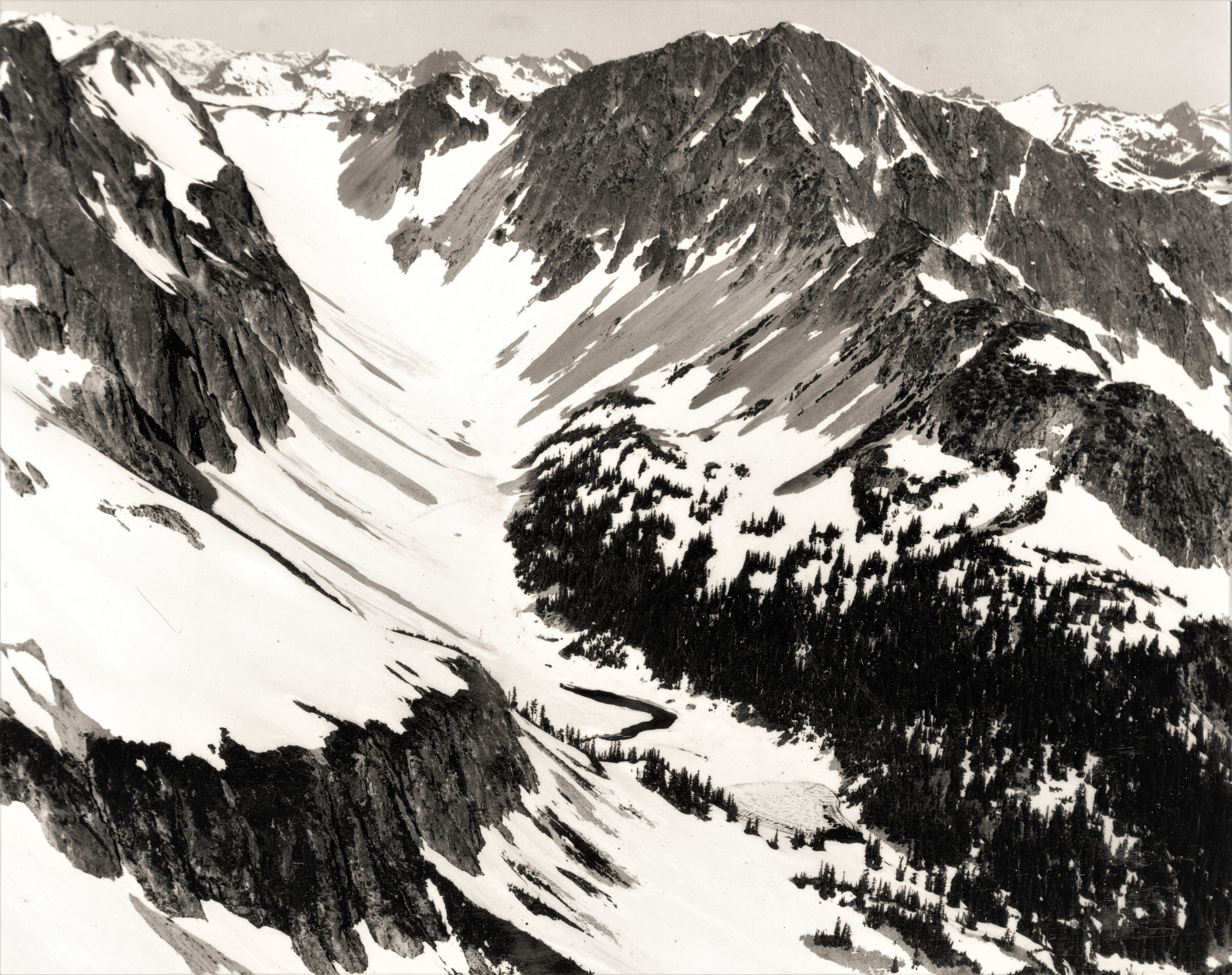
Indian Mountain lies to the right of the valley, Red Face Mountain to left

== See also ==
- Geography of the North Cascades
