= Katsuk Glacier =

Glacier in Washington, United States

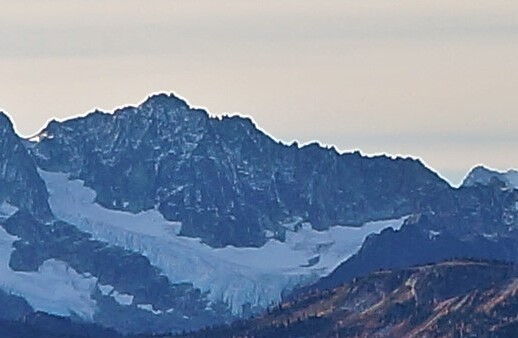
- Katsuk Glacier below Katsuk Peak

- Location within Washington (state)
- Type: Mountain glacier
- Location: Skagit County, Washington, U.S.
- Coordinates: 48°34′57″N 120°53′47″W
- Length: .50 mi (0.80 km)
- Terminus: Barren rock/icefall
- Status: Retreating

Katsuk Glacier is in North Cascades National Park in the U.S. state of Washington, in a cirque to the north of Katsuk Peak and east of Kimtah Peak. Both Katsuk and Kimtah Peaks are prominent summits along a ridge known as Jagged Edge. Katsuk Glacier consists of three disconnected sections, the largest of which stretches for over 1 mi (1.6 km) in width. Kimtah Glacier is immediately west of Katsuk Glacier, while the Mesahchie Glacier lies to the east.

== See also ==
- List of glaciers in the United States
