= Kimtah Glacier =

Glacier in Washington, United States

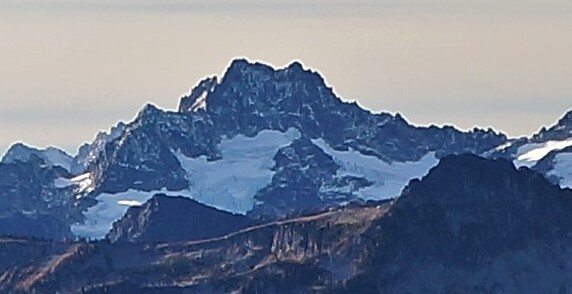
- Kimtah Glacier below the summit of Kimtah Peak

- Location within Washington (state)
- Type: Mountain glacier
- Location: Skagit County, Washington, U.S.
- Coordinates: 48°35′19″N 120°55′03″W
- Length: .40 mi (0.64 km)
- Terminus: Barren rock/icefall
- Status: Retreating

Kimtah Glacier is in North Cascades National Park in the U.S. state of Washington, in a cirque to the west of Kimtah Peak and east of Cosho Peak. Both Kimtah and Cosho Peaks are prominent summits along a ridge known as Jagged Edge. Kimtah Glacier is just under 1 mi (1.6 km) in width and descends northward from 8,100 to 7,000 ft (2,500 to 2,100 m) and has four lobes.

== See also ==
- List of glaciers in the United States
