= Mesahchie Glacier =

Glacier in Washington, United States

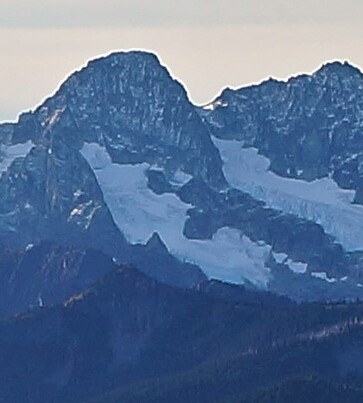
- Mesahchie Glacier (foreground)

- Location within Washington (state)
- Type: Mountain glacier
- Location: Skagit County, Washington, U.S.
- Coordinates: 48°34′56″N 120°51′56″W
- Length: .35 mi (0.56 km)
- Terminus: Barren rock/icefall
- Status: Retreating

Mesahchie Glacier is located in North Cascades National Park in the U.S. state of Washington, in a cirque to the northeast of Mesahchie Peak. Mesahchie Peak is the highest summit along a ridge known as Jagged Edge. Mesahchie Glacier is approximately .75 mi (1.21 km) in width and lies immediately east of Katsuk Glacier.

== See also ==
- List of glaciers in the United States
