= Porcupine Peak (Washington) =

Mountain in Washington (state), United States

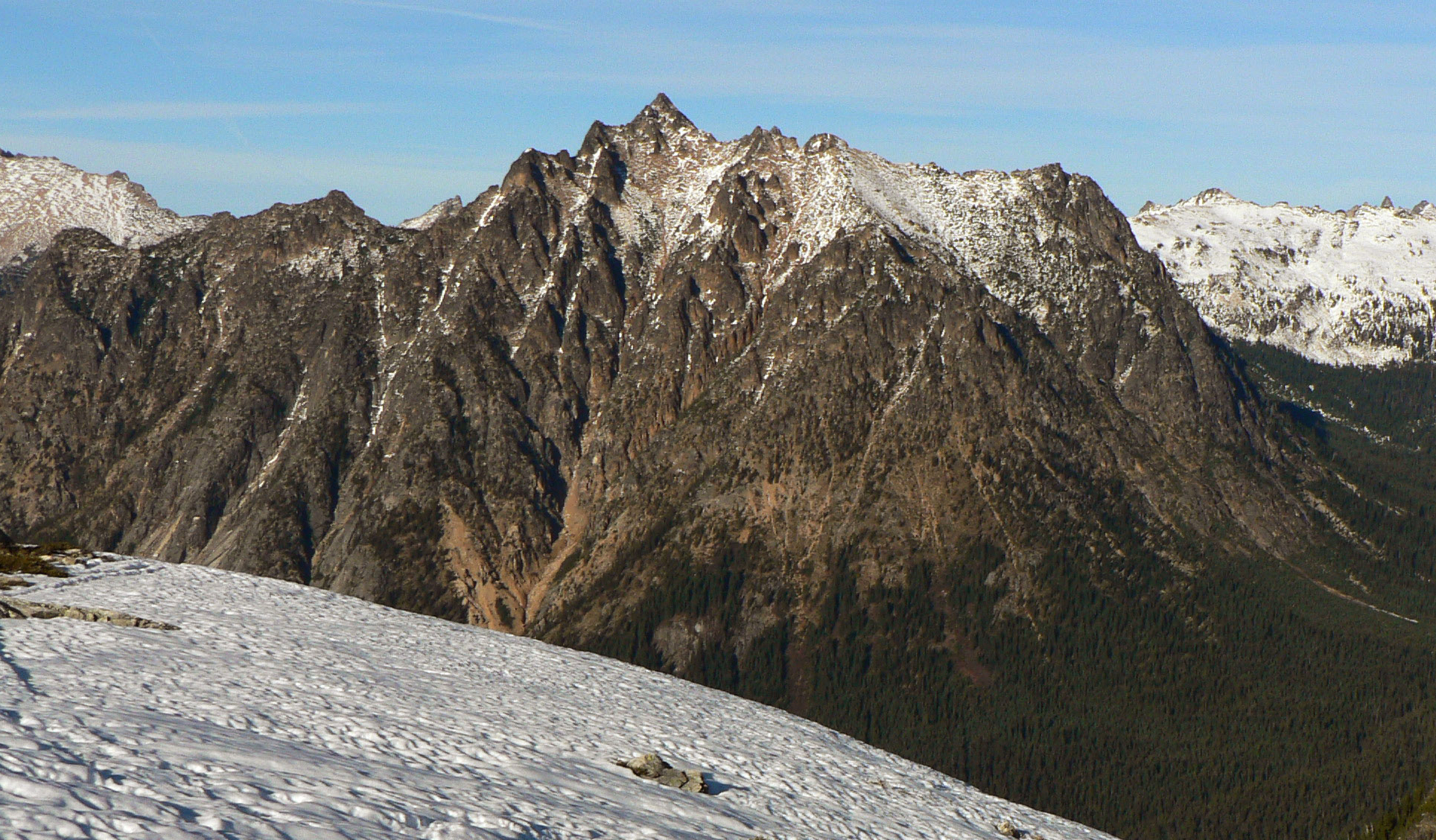
- South aspect, from Maple Pass trail

Highest point
- Elevation: 7,762 ft (2,366 m)
- Prominence: 922 ft (281 m)
- Parent peak: Peak 7865
- Isolation: 2.19 mi (3.52 km)
- Coordinates: 48°33′01″N 120°44′12″W

Geography
- Location within Washington (state) Location within the United States
- Interactive map of Porcupine Peak
- Country: United States
- State: Washington
- County: Skagit
- Parent range: North Cascades
- Topo map: USGS Washington Pass

Geology
- Rock type: Granite

Climbing
- Easiest route: Scrambling, class 3

Porcupine Peak is a 7,762-foot-elevation (2,366-meter) mountain located in Skagit County of Washington state in the United States.

== Description ==
Porcupine Peak is part of the Okanogan Range which is a sub-range of the North Cascades Range. It is situated north of Rainy Pass and south of Mount Hardy on land administered by the Okanogan–Wenatchee National Forest. The nearest higher peak is Cutthroat Peak, 2.19 miles (3.52 km) to the southeast. Porcupine Peak can be seen from the North Cascades Highway which follows below the southwest slopes of the mountain. Precipitation runoff from the mountain drains into the Porcupine Creek, Swamp Creek, and Granite Creek. These three creeks, which nearly encircle the mountain, ultimately empty to the Skagit River. Topographic relief is significant as the summit rises 3,600 feet (1,100 meters) above Granite Creek in 1.3 mile (2.1 km).

== Climate ==
Porcupine Peak is located in the marine west coast climate zone of western North America. Most weather fronts originating in the Pacific Ocean travel northeast toward the Cascade Mountains. As fronts approach the North Cascades, they are forced upward by the peaks of the Cascade Range (orographic lift), causing them to drop their moisture in the form of rain or snowfall onto the Cascades. As a result, the west side of the North Cascades experiences high precipitation, especially during the winter months in the form of snowfall. Because of maritime influence, snow tends to be wet and heavy, resulting in high avalanche danger. During winter months, weather is usually cloudy, but, due to high pressure systems over the Pacific Ocean that intensify during summer months, there is often little or no cloud cover during the summer.

== Geology ==
The North Cascades features some of the most rugged topography in the Cascade Range with craggy peaks, ridges, and deep glacial valleys. Geological events occurring many years ago created the diverse topography and drastic elevation changes over the Cascade Range leading to the various climate differences. These climate differences lead to vegetation variety defining the ecoregions in this area.

The history of the formation of the Cascade Mountains dates back millions of years ago to the late Eocene Epoch. With the North American Plate overriding the Pacific Plate, episodes of volcanic igneous activity persisted. In addition, small fragments of the oceanic and continental lithosphere called terranes created the North Cascades about 50 million years ago.

During the Pleistocene period dating back over two million years ago, glaciation advancing and retreating repeatedly scoured the landscape leaving deposits of rock debris. The U-shaped cross section of the river valleys is a result of recent glaciation. Uplift and faulting in combination with glaciation have been the dominant processes which have created the tall peaks and deep valleys of the North Cascades area.

== Gallery ==
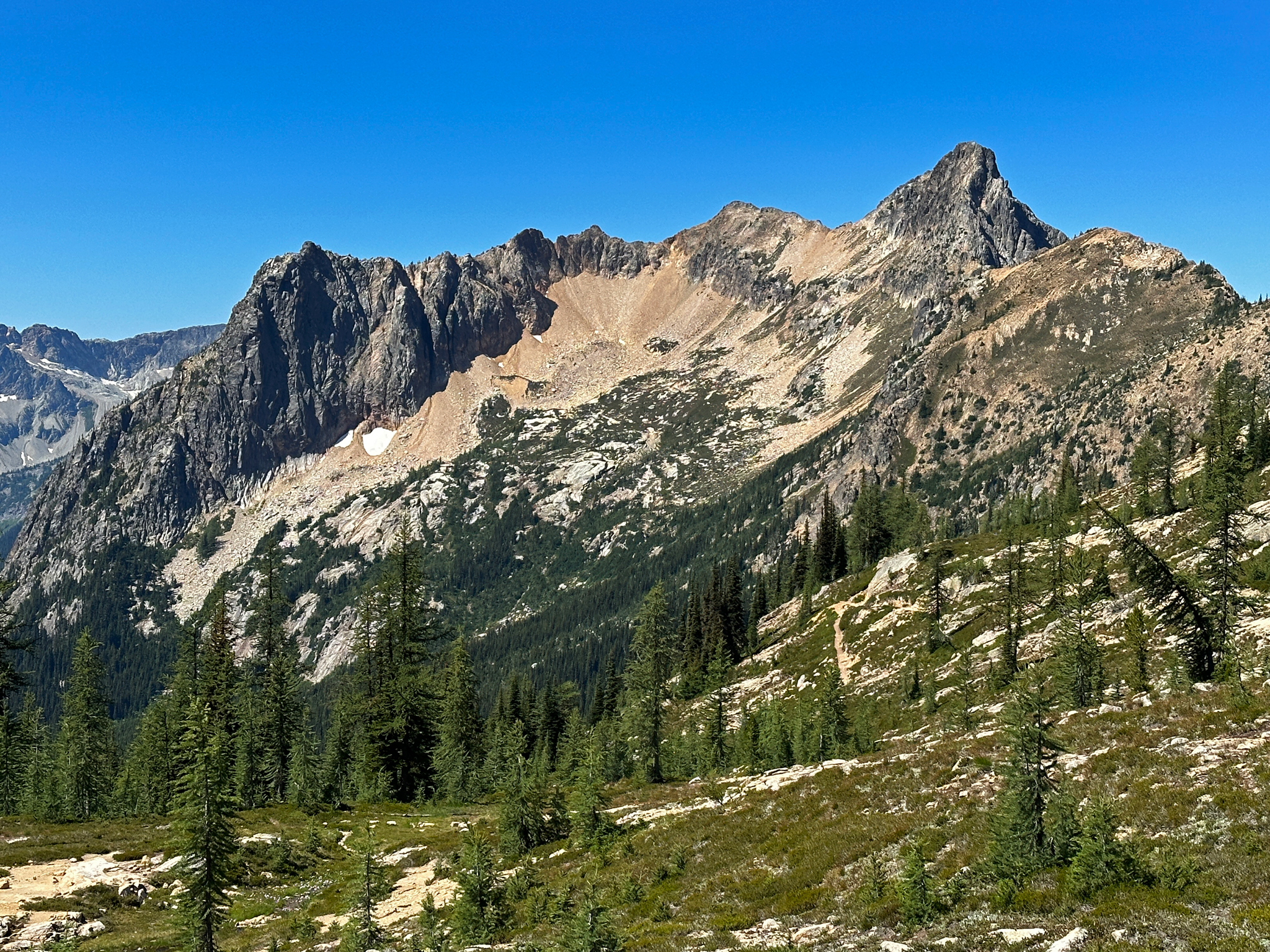
East aspect from Cutthroat Pass

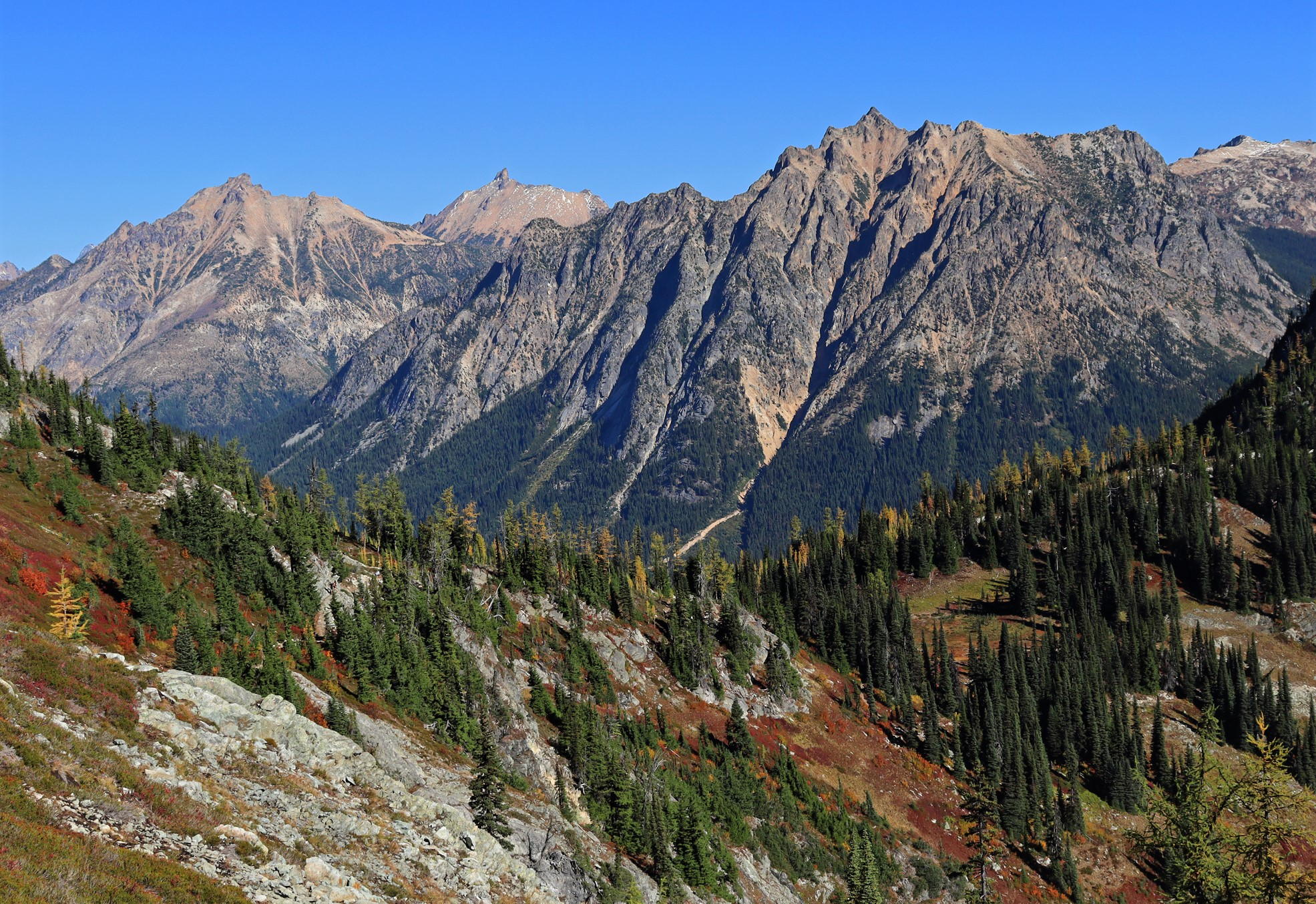
Mt. Hardy (left), Golden Horn, and Porcupine Peak (right)

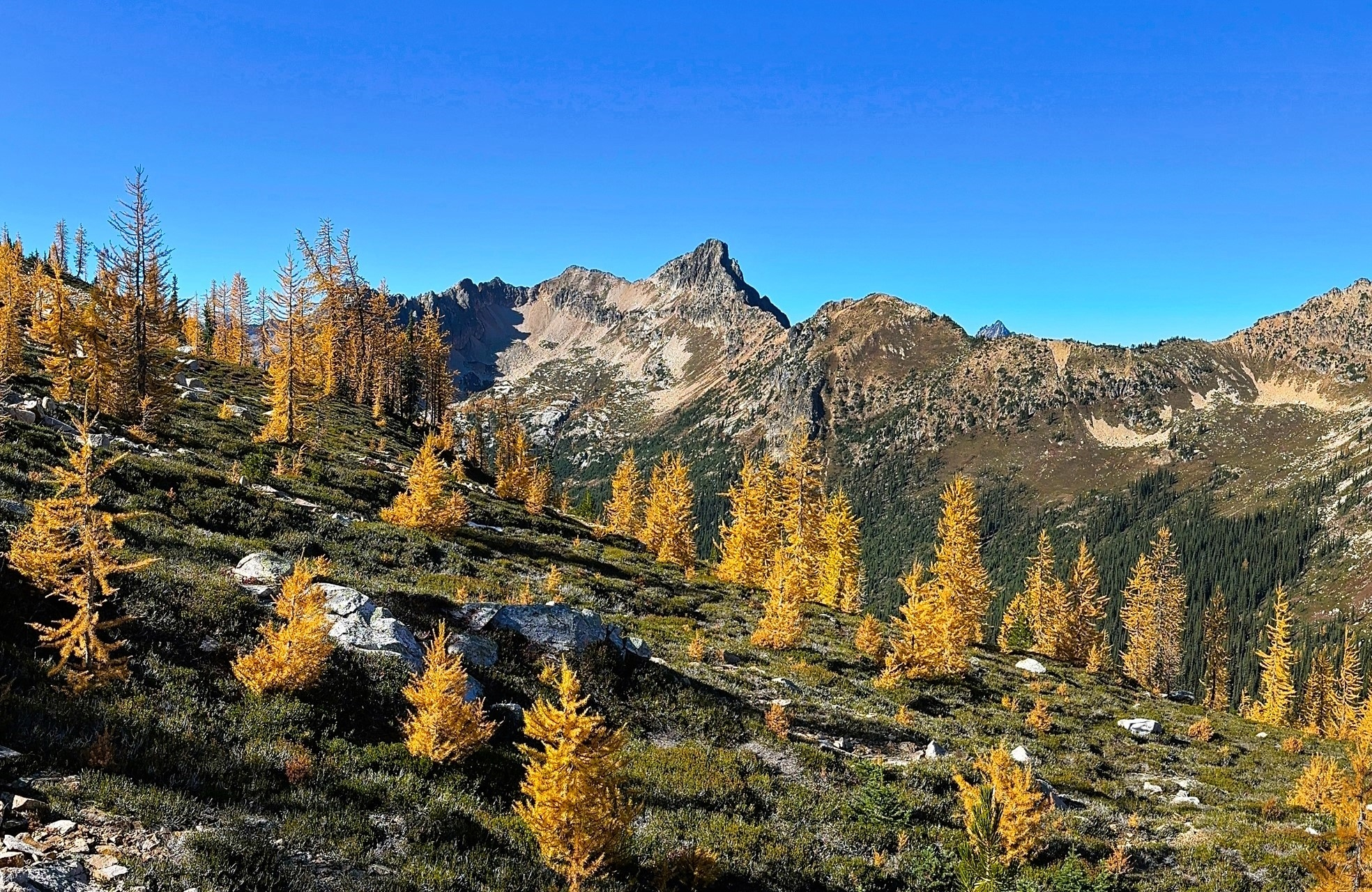
Porcupine Peak and larch trees viewed from Cutthroat Pass

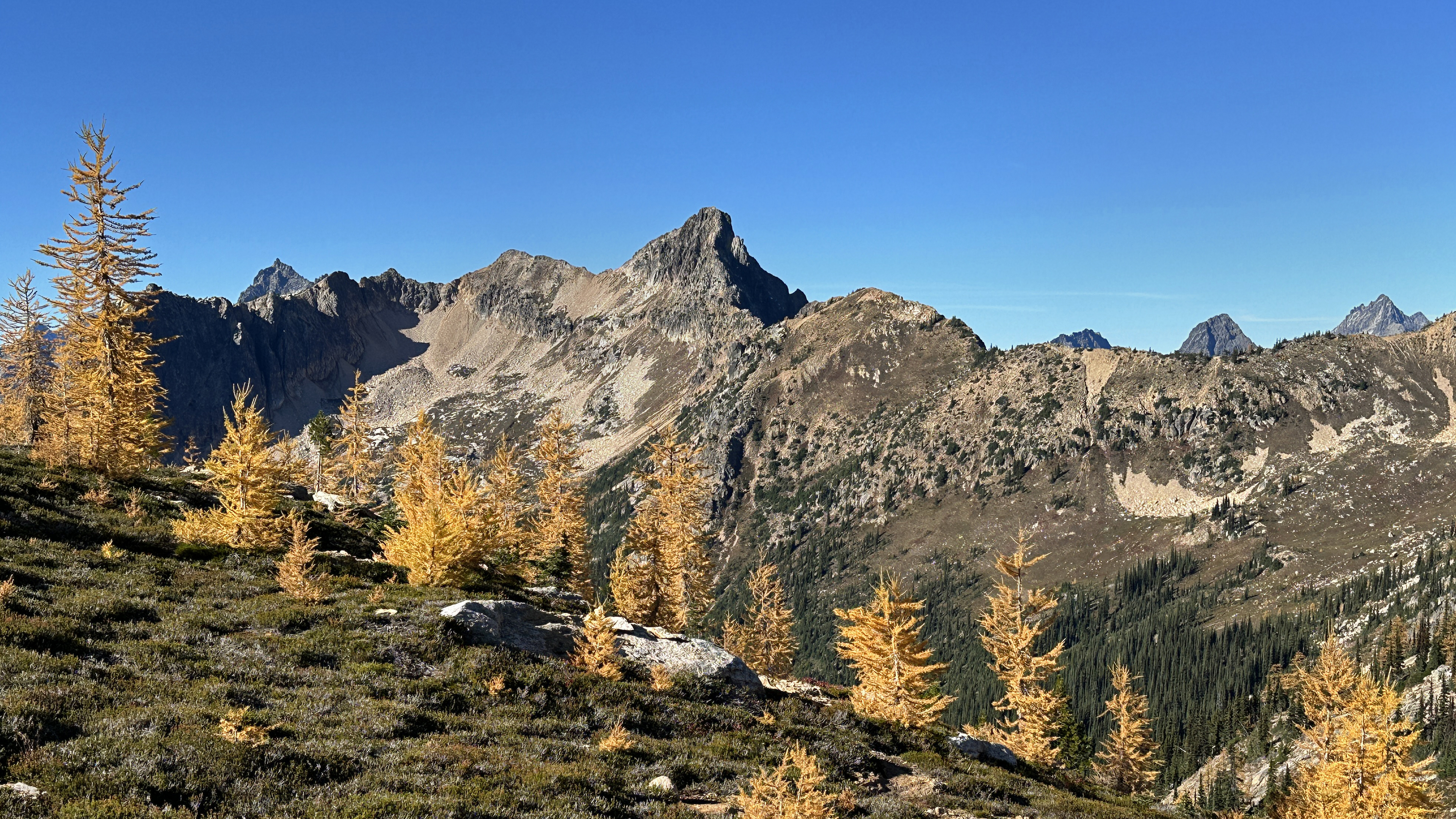
Porcupine Peak viewed from Cutthroat Pass

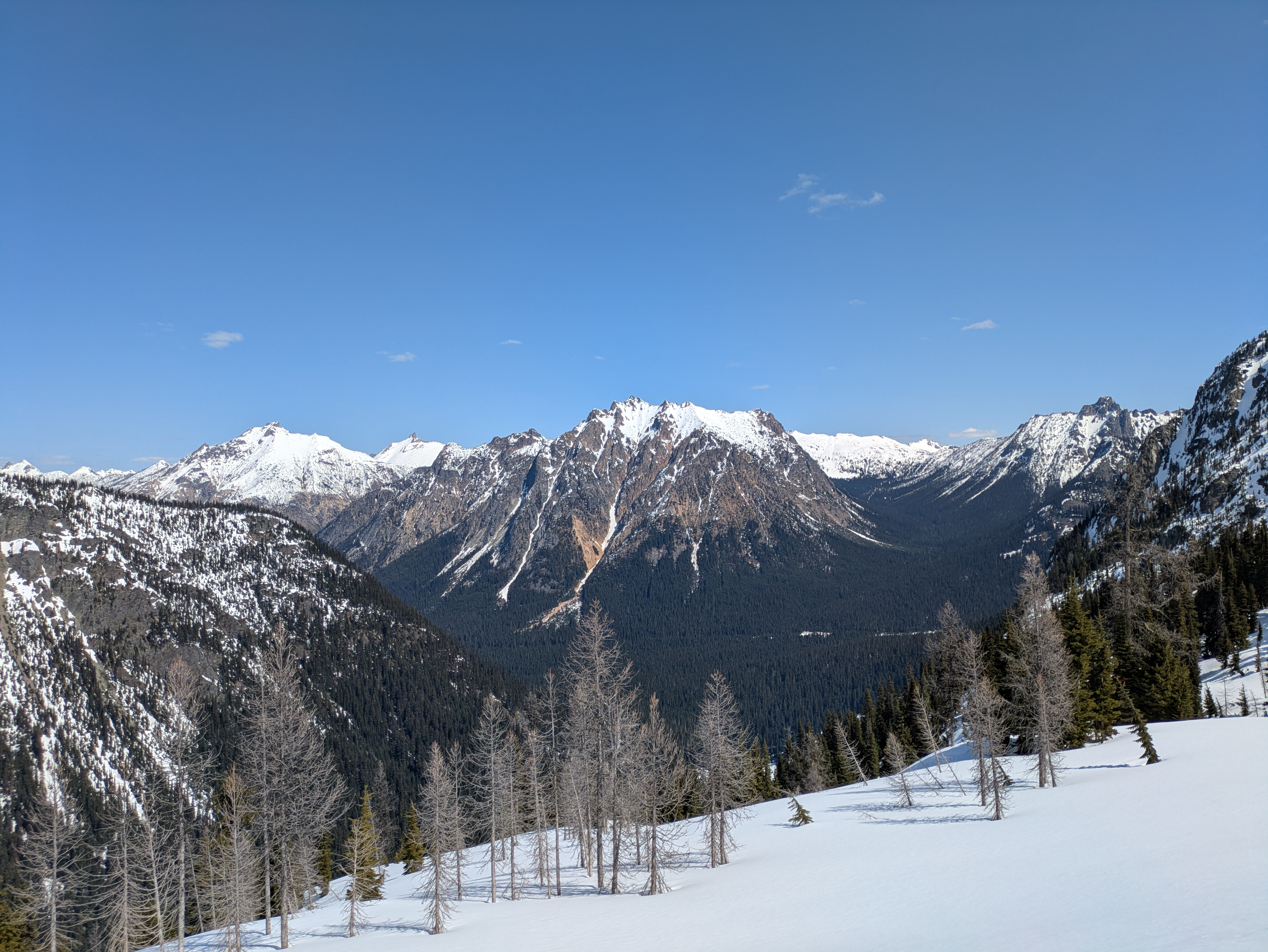
South aspect, centered

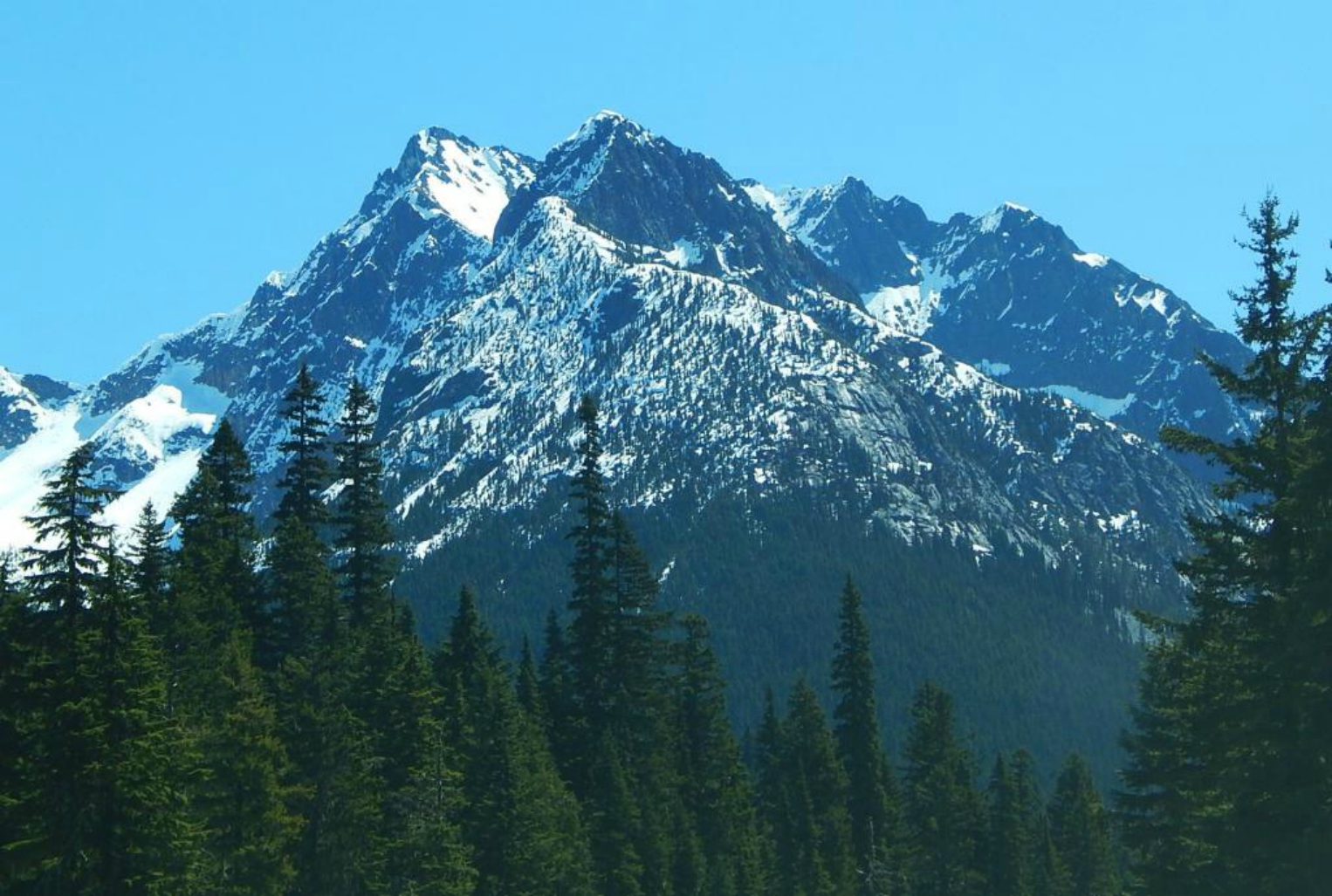
Porcupine Peak seen from the North Cascades Highway

== See also ==
- Geography of the North Cascades
