= Katsuk Peak =

Mountain in Washington (state), United States

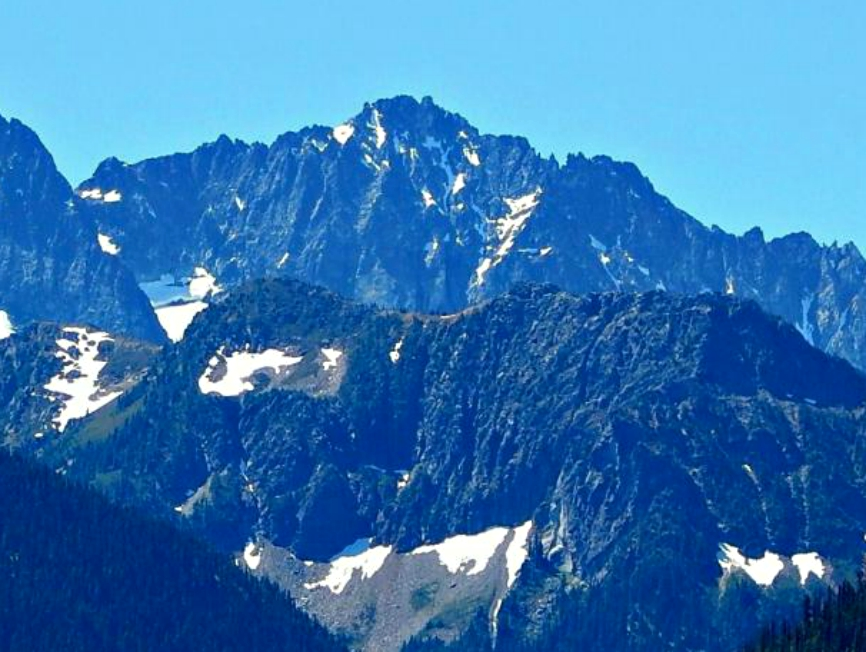

Highest point
- Elevation: 8,680+ ft (2,650+ m)
- Prominence: 440 ft (130 m)
- Coordinates: 48°34′42″N 120°53′18″W

Geography
- Location within Washington (state) Location within the United States
- Location: Skagit County, Washington, U.S.
- Parent range: Cascade Range
- Topo map: USGS Mount Logan

Katsuk Peak, elevation 8,680+ ft (2,650+ m), is in North Cascades National Park in the U.S. state of Washington. Katsuk Peak is a summit along a ridge known as Jagged Edge. Katsuk Glacier is on the north slopes of the peak. Katsuk Peak is separated from Mesahchie Peak by a distance of only .25 mi (0.40 km).
