= Mount Arriva =

Mountain in Washington (state), United States

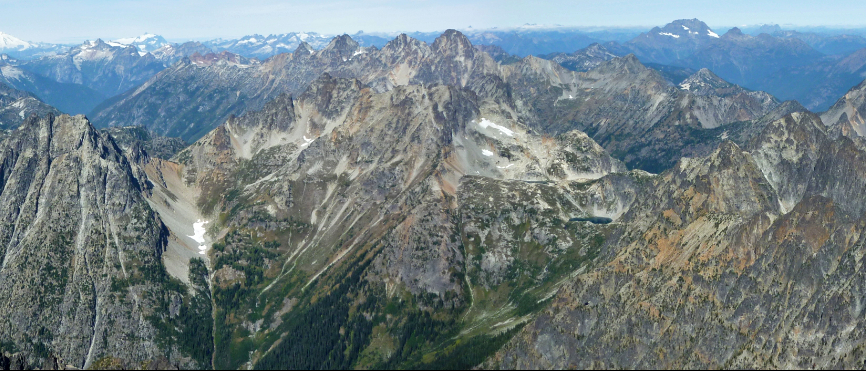
- Arriva and Ragged Ridge from Black Peak

Highest point
- Elevation: 8,215 ft (2,504 m)
- Prominence: 1,215 ft (370 m)
- Parent peak: Black Peak 8,975 ft
- Isolation: 2.3 mi (3.7 km)
- Coordinates: 48°32′56″N 120°51′26″W

Geography
- Location within Washington (state) Location within the United States
- Interactive map of Mount Arriva
- Country: United States
- State: Washington
- County: Chelan / Skagit
- Protected area: North Cascades National Park; Stephen Mather Wilderness
- Parent range: North Cascades
- Topo map: USGS Mount Arriva

Geology
- Rock age: Late Cretaceous
- Rock type: Tonalitic pluton

Climbing
- First ascent: 1966
- Easiest route: class 3 scrambling

Mount Arriva is an 8,215 ft (2,500 m) elevation mountain summit located in the North Cascades in the U.S. state of Washington. It is situated in North Cascades National Park, on the shared border of Chelan County and Skagit County. Despite its position only 1.55 mi (2.49 km) southwest of Easy Pass, and 3.7 mi (6.0 km) west of the North Cascades Highway, it is not visible from either. Its nearest higher peak is Black Peak, 2.57 mi (4.14 km) to the southeast. Mount Arriva has a secondary summit, called East Peak (8,160+ ft), which was first climbed in August 1940 by Fred Beckey, Jim Crooks, and Ed Kennedy. The first ascent of the true summit (West Peak) was made July 6, 1966, by Joe and Joan Firey, John and Irene Meulemans.

== Climate ==
Mount Arriva is located in the marine west coast climate zone of western North America. This climate supports a small glacier on the northeast side of the peak. Most weather fronts originating in the Pacific Ocean travel northeast toward the Cascade Mountains. As fronts approach the North Cascades, they are forced upward by the peaks of the Cascade Range (orographic lift), causing them to drop their moisture in the form of rain or snowfall onto the Cascades. As a result, the west side of the North Cascades experiences high precipitation, especially during the winter months in the form of snowfall. Because of maritime influence, snow tends to be wet and heavy, resulting in high avalanche danger. During winter months, the weather is usually cloudy, but due to high pressure systems over the Pacific Ocean that intensify during summer months, there is often little or no cloud cover during the summer. Due to its temperate climate and proximity to the Pacific Ocean, areas west of the Cascade Crest very rarely experience temperatures below 0 °F (−18 °C) or above 80 °F (27 °C). Precipitation runoff from Mount Arriva drains into tributaries of the Stehekin and Skagit Rivers.

== Geology ==
The North Cascades features some of the most rugged topography in the Cascade Range with craggy peaks and ridges and deep glacial valleys. Geological events occurring many years ago created the diverse topography and drastic elevation changes over the Cascade Range leading to the various climate differences. These climate differences lead to vegetation variety defining the ecoregions in this area.

The history of the formation of the Cascade Mountains dates back millions of years ago to the late Eocene Epoch. With the North American Plate overriding the Pacific Plate, episodes of volcanic igneous activity persisted. In addition, small fragments of the oceanic and continental lithosphere called terranes created the North Cascades about 50 million years ago.

During the Pleistocene period dating back over two million years ago, glaciation advancing and retreating repeatedly scoured the landscape leaving deposits of rock debris. The U-shaped cross section of the river valleys is a result of recent glaciation. Uplift and faulting in combination with glaciation have been the dominant processes which have created the tall peaks and deep valleys of the North Cascades area.

== Gallery ==
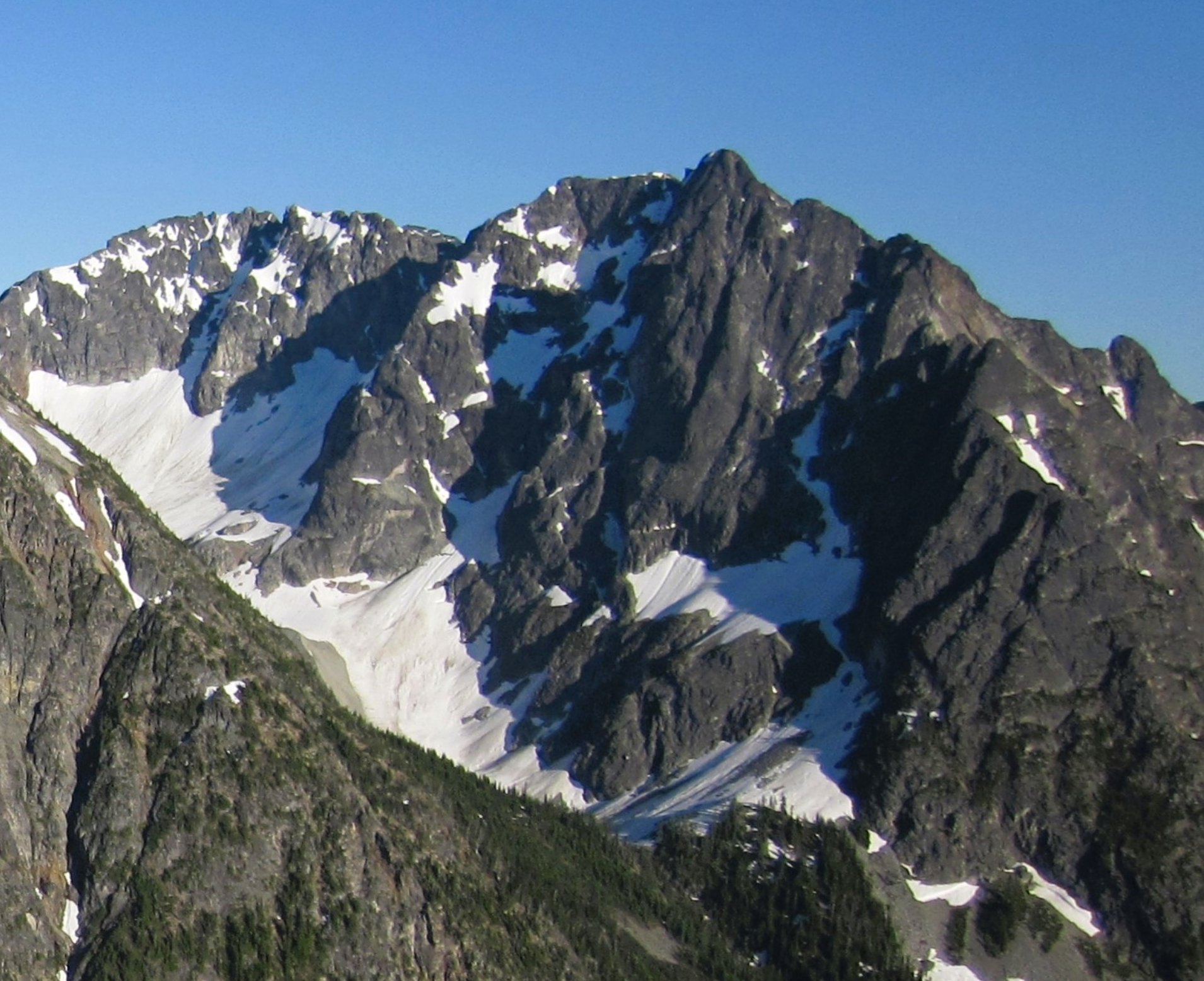
Northwest aspect

== See also ==
- Geography of the North Cascades
- List of Highest Mountain Peaks in Washington
