= Stephen Mather Wilderness =

Wilderness area in Washington, United States

- IUCN category Ib (wilderness area)
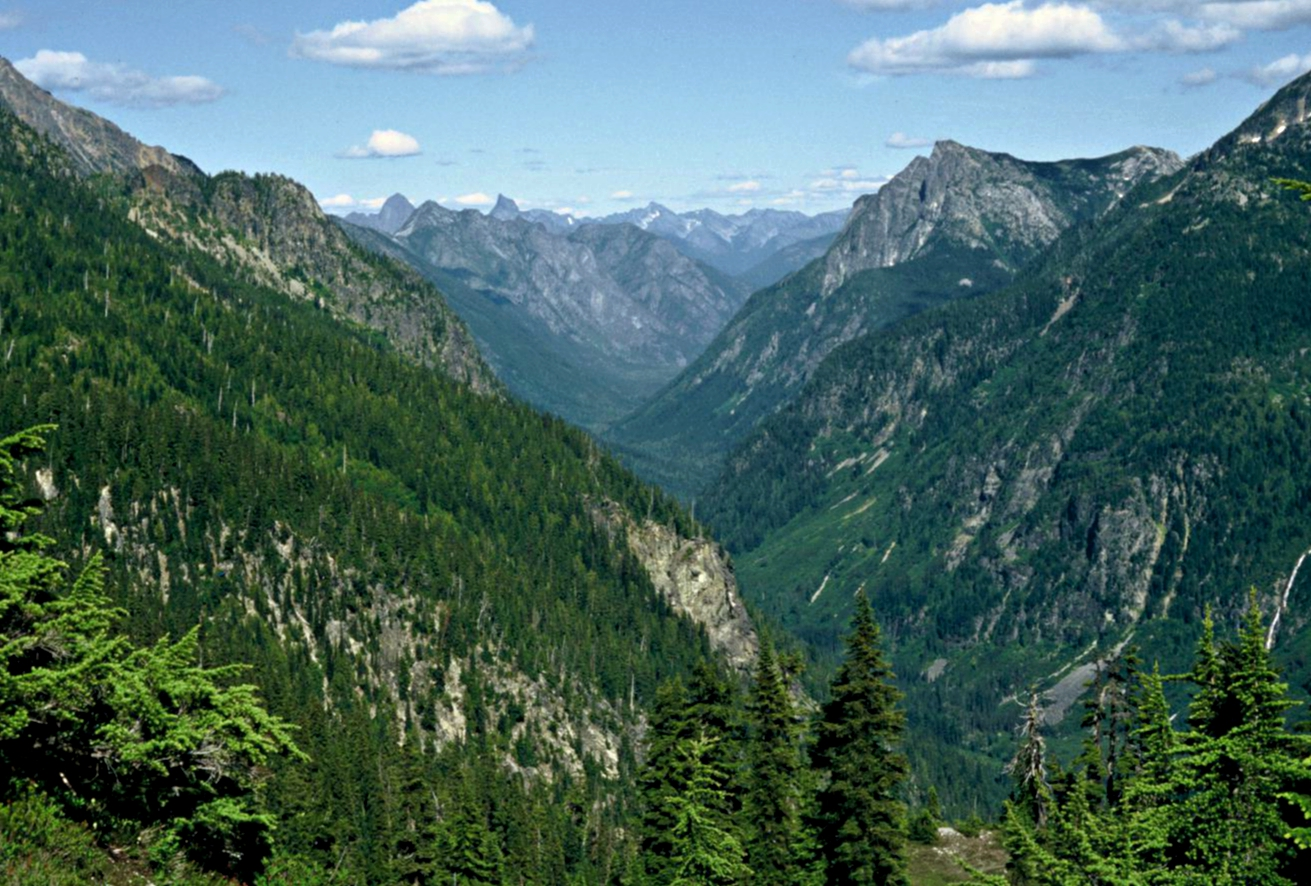
- Little Beaver Valley

- Location within the United States
- Location: Whatcom / Chelan / Skagit counties, Washington, USA
- Nearest city: Marblemount, Washington
- Coordinates: 48°39′0″N 121°08′0″W
- Area: 634,614 acres (256,819 ha)
- Established: 1988
- Governing body: National Park Service

The Stephen Mather Wilderness is a 634,614 acres (256,819 ha) wilderness area honoring Stephen Mather, the first director of the National Park Service. It is located within North Cascades National Park, Lake Chelan National Recreation Area, and Ross Lake National Recreation Area in the North Cascade Range of Washington, United States.

It is bordered by the Pasayten Wilderness to the northeast, the Mount Baker Wilderness to the northwest, the Noisy-Diobsud Wilderness to the west, the Glacier Peak Wilderness to the southwest, and the Lake Chelan-Sawtooth Wilderness to the southeast.

The North Cascades National Park Complex consists of three units which make up Stephen Mather Wilderness: 505,000-acre (204,366 ha) North Cascades National Park, which boasts 504,614 acres (204,210 ha) acres of designated wilderness; 117,600-acre (47,591 ha) Ross Lake National Recreation Area, a slim piece of land just east of the park that has 74,000 acres (29,947 ha) acres of designated wilderness; and 62,000-acre (25,091 ha) Lake Chelan National Recreation Area, at the southeast corner of the park, with 56,000 acres (22,662 ha) of designated wilderness.

== Wildlife ==
The Stephen Mather Wilderness provides a protected area for a wide variety of wildlife, including elk, mule deer, gray wolf, mountain goat, moose, and bighorn sheep. Species of wolverine, bat, duck, hawk, owl, frog, loon, chipmunk, coyote, squirrel, bear, falcon and eagle are also fairly common.

There are approximately twenty-eight species and subspecies of fish found in the wilderness, including the threatened bull trout and anadromous runs of coastal cutthroat trout, Dolly Varden, steelhead, and five species of salmon found in the Skagit, Nooksack, and Chilliwack drainages.

Threatened or endangered wildlife species in the area include bull trout (threatened) and northern spotted owl.

== Recreation ==
Common recreational activities in the Stephen Mather Wilderness include backpacking, camping, wildlife watching, climbing, and hunting. There are some 390 miles (628 km) of trails in the wilderness, include the Pacific Crest Trail, which crosses the southeastern corner of the park for about 13 miles (21 km). Much of the area can only be reached by multiday hikes, often combined with mountaineering, through remote, trailless territory.

== See also ==
- List of U.S. Wilderness Areas
