= McGregor Mountain (Washington) =

Mountain in Washington, US

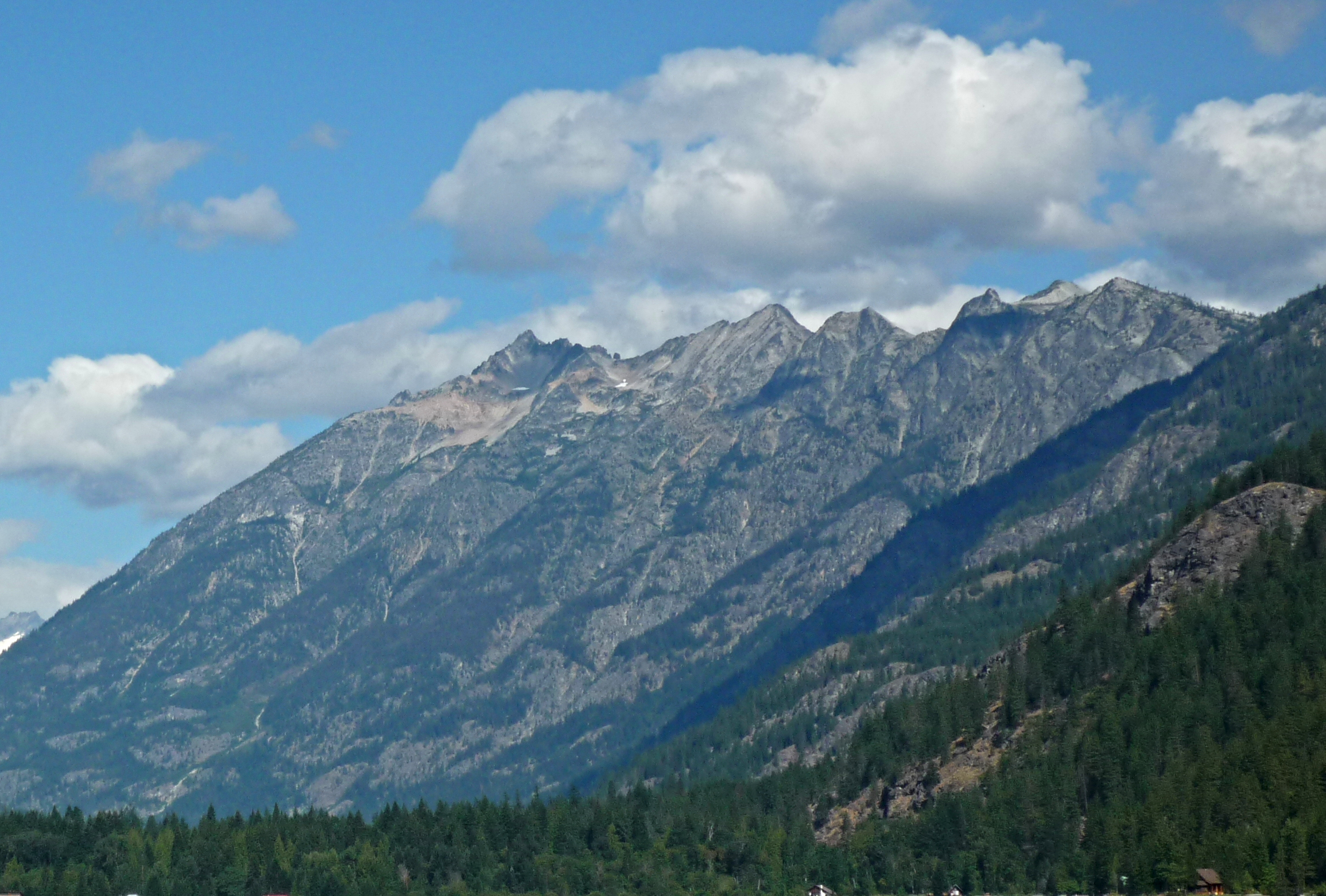
- Southeast aspect, from Stehekin

Highest point
- Elevation: 8,143 ft (2,482 m)
- Prominence: 2,162 ft (659 m)
- Isolation: 6.91 mi (11.12 km)
- Coordinates: 48°24′29″N 120°47′54″W

Geography
- Location within Washington (state) Location within the United States
- Interactive map of McGregor Mountain
- Country: United States
- State: Washington
- County: Chelan
- Protected area: North Cascades National Park
- Parent range: Cascade Range; North Cascades; Methow Mountains
- Topo map: USGS McGregor Mountain

Geology
- Rock type: Skagit gneiss

Climbing
- Easiest route: Scrambling southwest ridge

McGregor Mountain is an 8,143-foot (2,482-metre) elevation massif located in the Stehekin Valley of the North Cascades, in Chelan County of Washington state. McGregor Mountain is situated northwest of Lake Chelan in the northern Methow Mountains, on the shared border of North Cascades National Park and Lake Chelan National Recreation Area. The closest community is Stehekin, and the nearest higher neighbor is Goode Mountain, 7.3 miles (11.7 km) to the northwest. Precipitation runoff from the mountain drains into tributaries of the Stehekin River. Topographic relief is significant since the southern aspect of the mountain rises 6,600 feet above this river in approximately two miles. The famous Pacific Crest Trail traverses the western base of this mountain, and the strenuous 7.7-mile (12.4 km) McGregor Mountain Trail gains 6,400 feet (1,920 m) of elevation to take hikers within a half-mile of the summit. Reaching the summit requires exposed scrambling the final 1,100 feet (330 m), and an ice axe is needed if the trail remains covered by snowpack. The summit was the site of an old fire lookout cabin from 1923 until 1955, but now has a radio repeater for the National Park Service. The views from the top include Glacier Peak, Black Peak, Corteo Peak, Frisco Mountain, Tupshin Peak, Dome Peak, Glory Mountain, and many others. This mountain was named for Billy McGregor, a Stehekin Valley resident who had a cabin and homestead at the base of this mountain during the 1890s. In May 1901, Billy disappeared overnight from a boat docked in Lake Chelan, and was never seen or heard from again.

== Climate ==
McGregor Mountain has an alpine climate which supports the Sandalee Glacier on its northern slopes. Weather fronts originating in the Pacific Ocean travel northeast toward the Cascade Mountains. As fronts approach the North Cascades, they are forced upward by the peaks of the Cascade Range, causing them to drop their moisture in the form of rain or snowfall onto the Cascades (Orographic lift). As a result, the North Cascades experiences high precipitation, especially during the winter months in the form of snowfall. During winter months, weather is usually cloudy, but, due to high pressure systems over the Pacific Ocean that intensify during summer months, there is often little or no cloud cover during the summer.

== Geology ==
The North Cascades features some of the most rugged topography in the Cascade Range with craggy peaks and ridges, deep glacial valleys, and granite spires. Geological events occurring many years ago created the diverse topography and drastic elevation changes over the Cascade Range leading to the various climate differences. These climate differences lead to vegetation variety defining the ecoregions in this area.

The history of the formation of the Cascade Mountains dates back millions of years ago to the late Eocene Epoch. With the North American Plate overriding the Pacific Plate, episodes of volcanic igneous activity persisted. In addition, small fragments of the oceanic and continental lithosphere called terranes created the North Cascades about 50 million years ago.

During the Pleistocene period dating back over two million years ago, glaciation advancing and retreating repeatedly scoured the landscape leaving deposits of rock debris. The U-shaped cross section of the river valleys is a result of recent glaciation. Uplift and faulting in combination with glaciation have been the dominant processes which have created the tall peaks and deep valleys of the North Cascades area.

== See also ==
- Geology of the Pacific Northwest
- Geography of the North Cascades

== Gallery ==
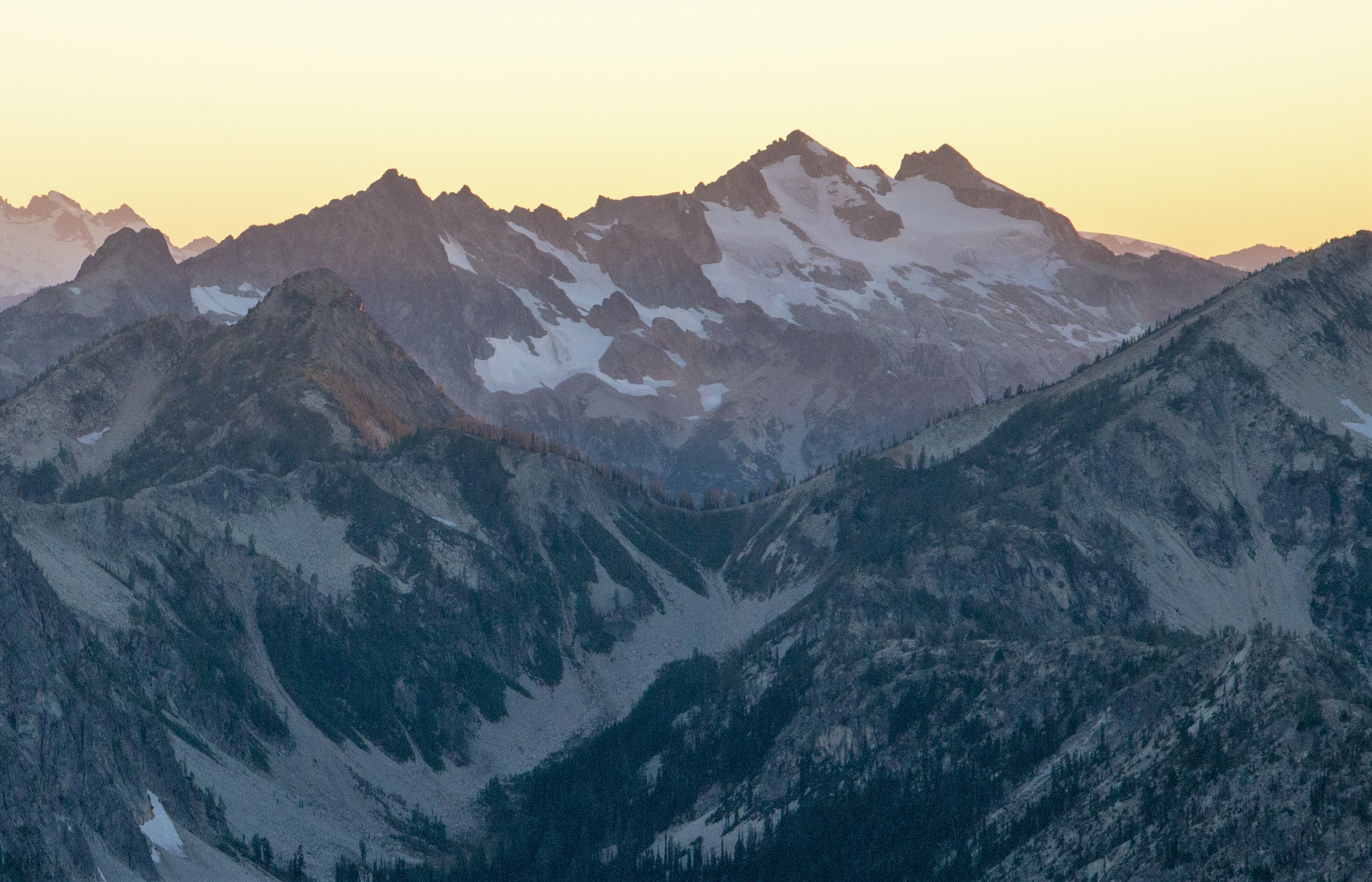

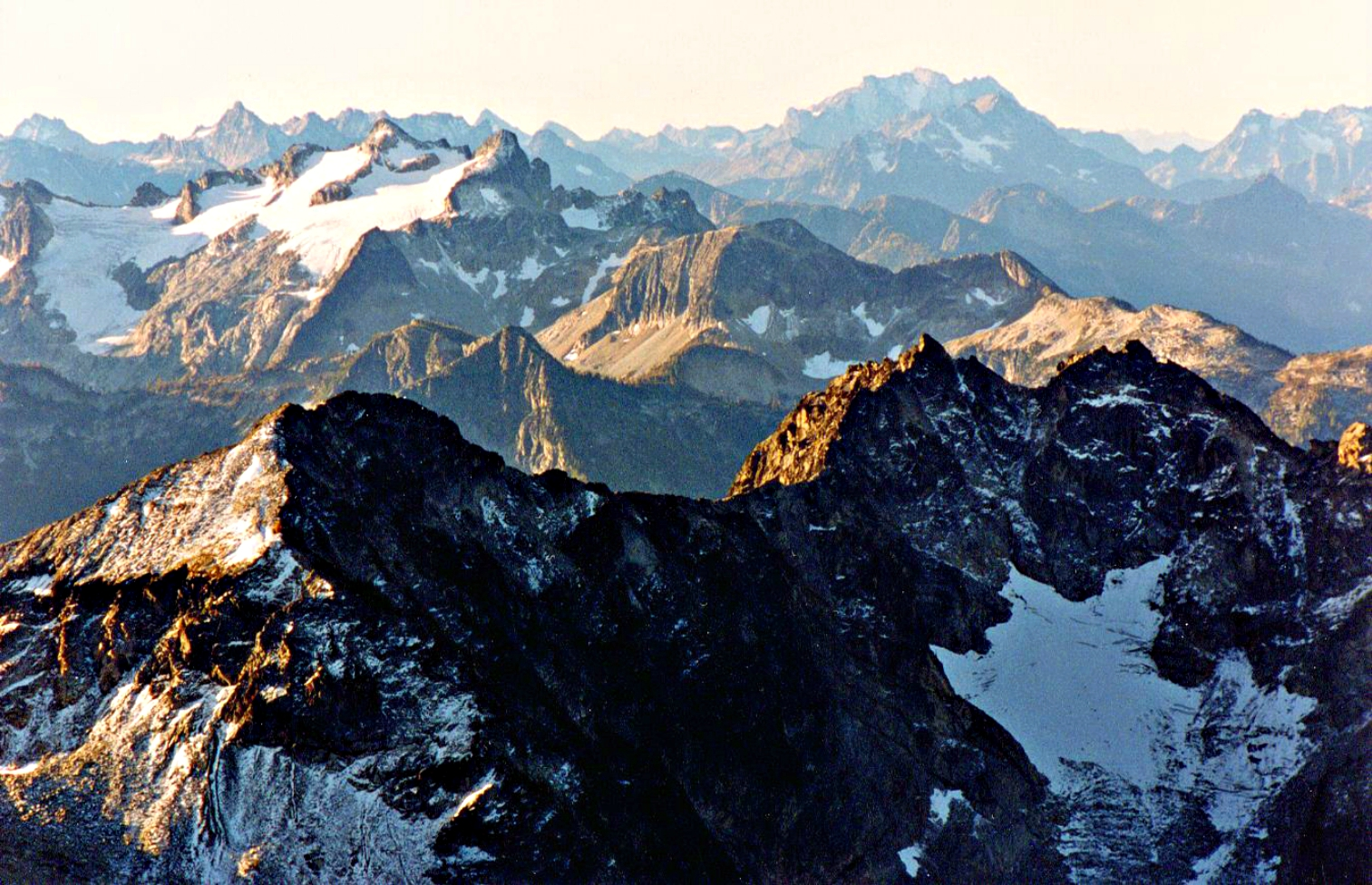
Sandalee Glacier and McGregor in upper left
(Mount Benzarino in lower half of frame)

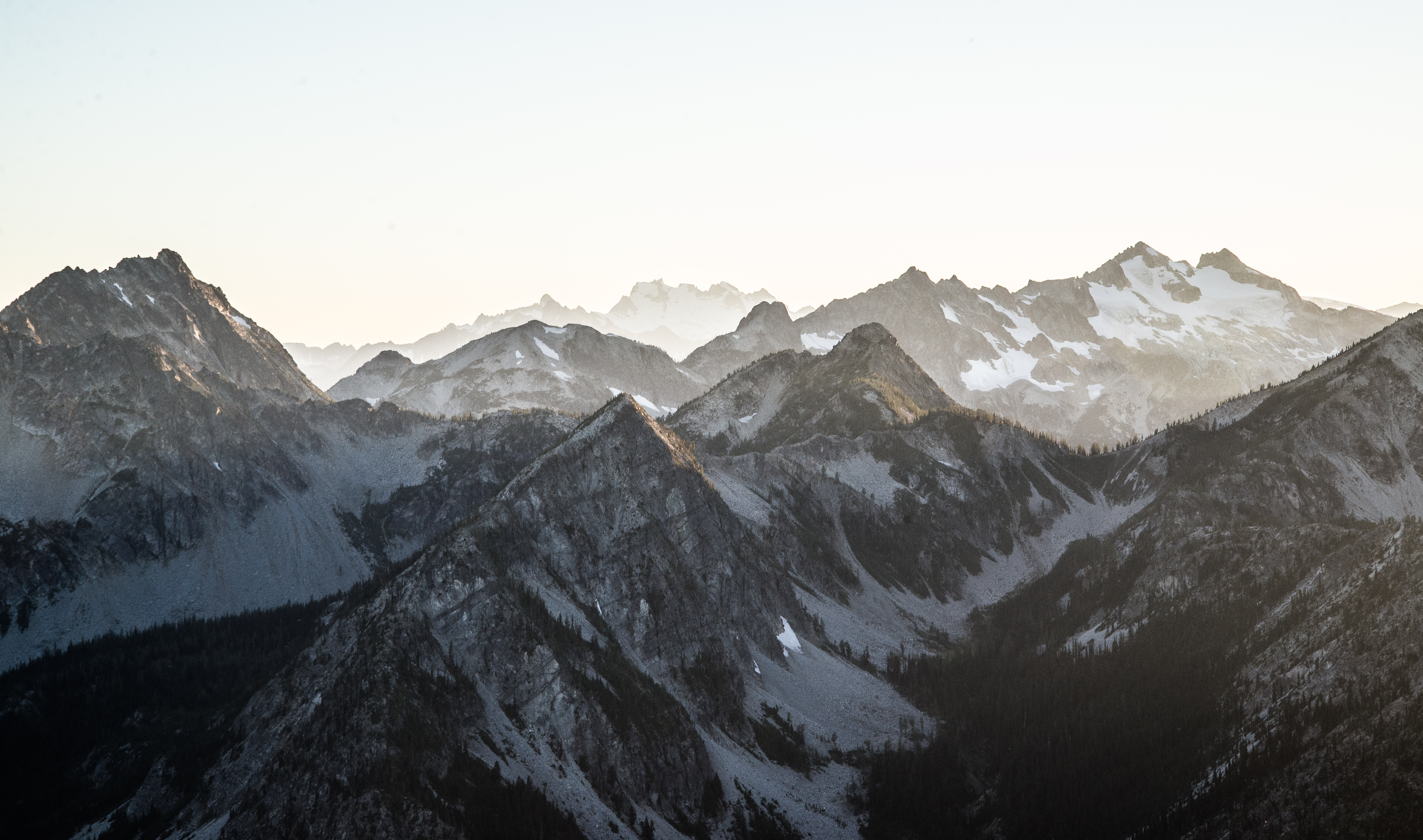
McGregor in upper right

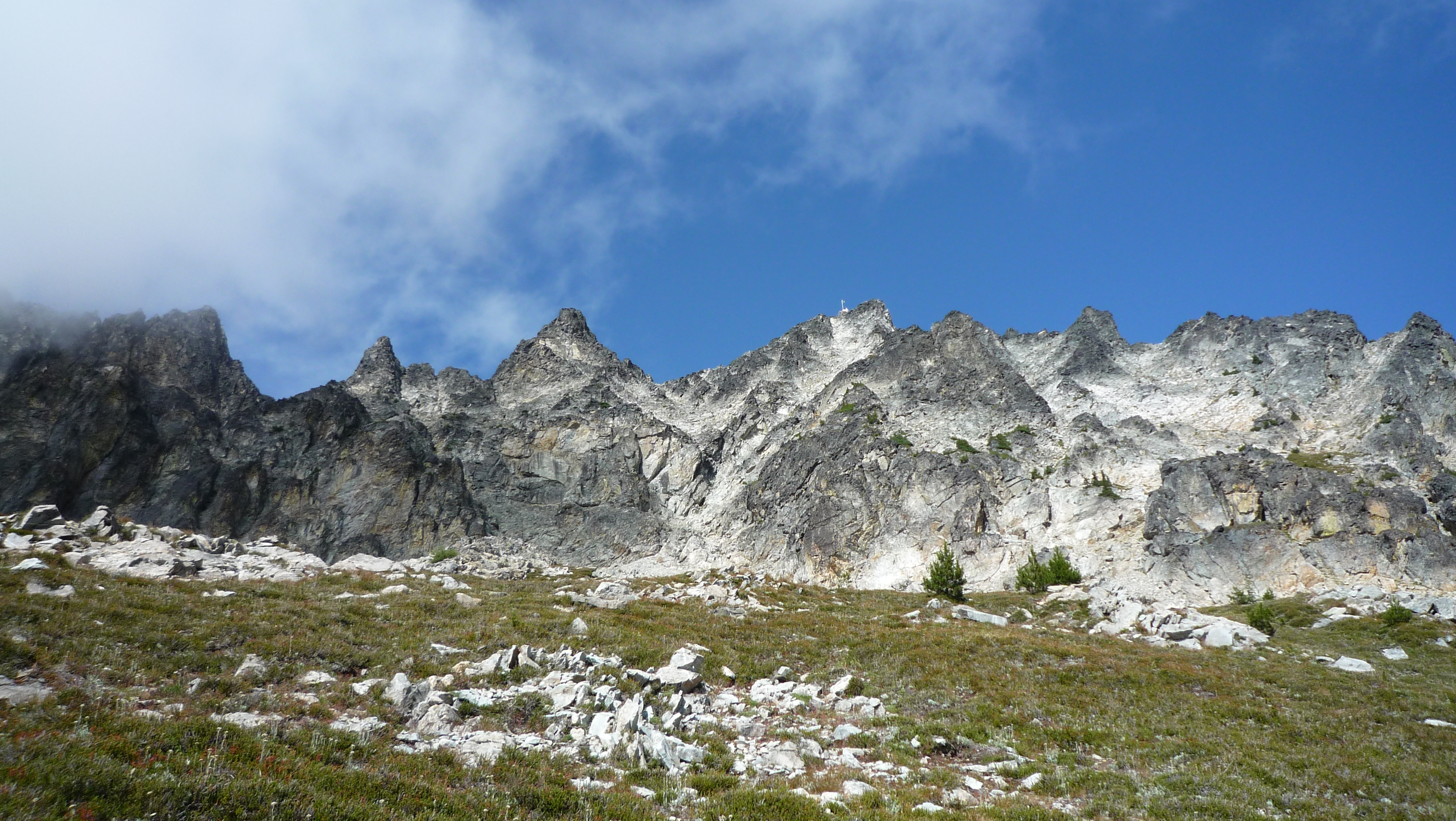
McGregor Mountain's south aspect. Enlarge to see the repeater visible on the summit.
