= Lewis Glacier (Washington) =

Glacier in Washington, United States

- Location within Washington (state)
- Type: Mountain glacier
- Location: Skagit County, Washington, U.S.
- Coordinates: 48°30′42″N 120°47′50″W
- Length: .20 mi (0.32 km)
- Terminus: Talus
- Status: Retreating/Extinct

Lewis Glacier is in Wenatchee National Forest in the U.S. state of Washington and is 1 mi (1.6 km) southeast of Black Peak. Lewis Glacier is located on the north flank of Corteo Peak just east of the border of North Cascades National Park and has a pronounced terminal moraine now well below the current terminus of the glacier.

Lewis Glacier is now said to have disappeared.

== See also ==
- List of glaciers in the United States
