= Rainy Peak =

Mountain in Washington (state), United States

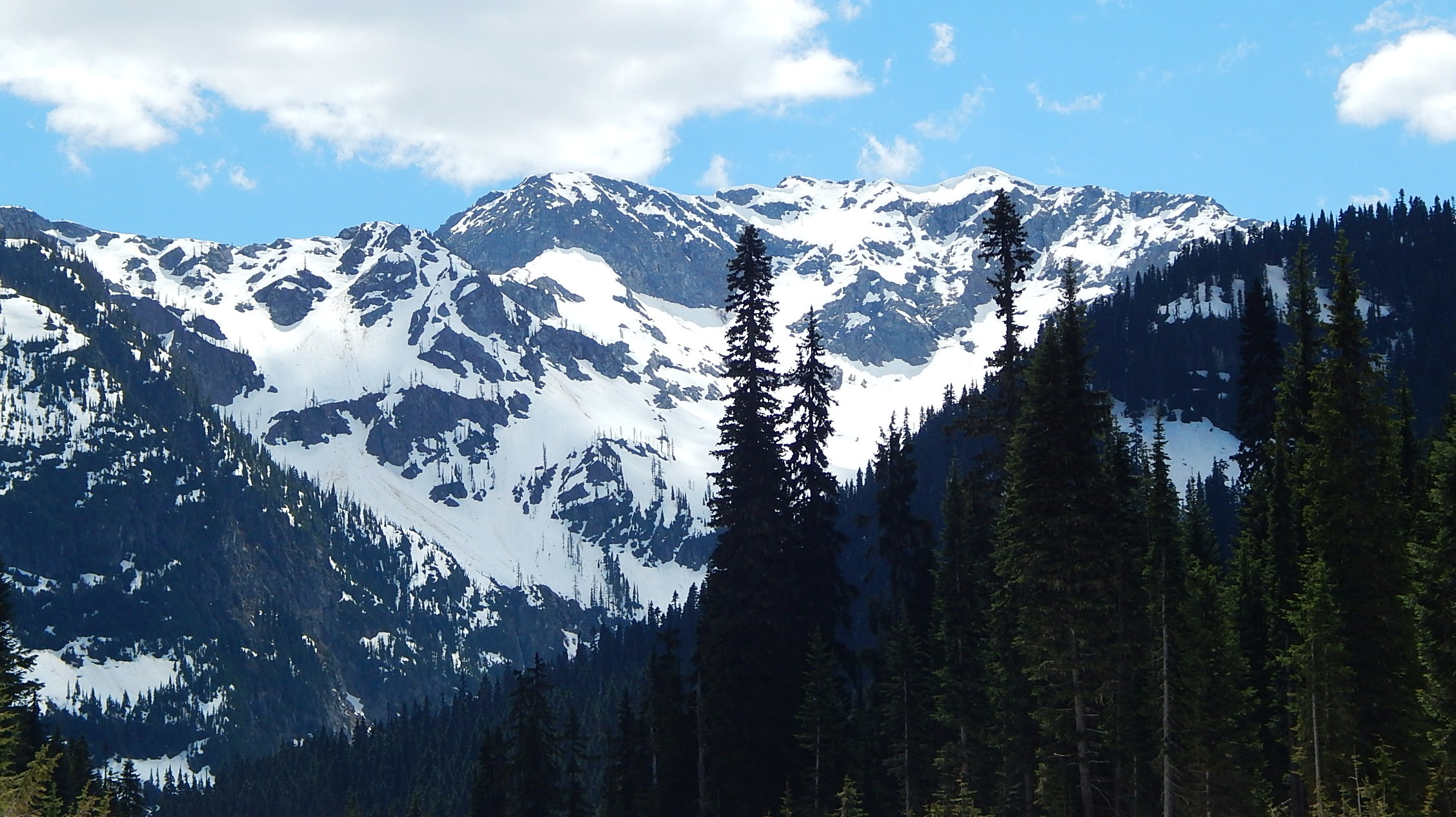
- Rainy Peak seen from the North Cascades Highway near Rainy Pass

Highest point
- Elevation: 7,768 ft (2,368 m)
- Prominence: 1,288 ft (390 m)
- Parent peak: Frisco Mountain (7,760 ft)
- Isolation: 0.53 mi (0.85 km)
- Coordinates: 48°29′07″N 120°44′47″W

Geography
- Location within Washington (state) Location within the United States
- Interactive map of Rainy Peak
- Country: United States
- State: Washington
- County: Chelan
- Protected area: Stephen Mather Wilderness
- Parent range: North Cascades
- Topo map: USGS McAlister Mountain

Climbing
- Easiest route: Scrambling

Rainy Peak is a 7,768 ft (2,368 m) summit in the Cascade Range in the U.S. state of Washington. It is located 3 kilometers (1.9 miles) south of Rainy Pass and one kilometer (0.62 miles) southeast of Frisco Mountain on the borders of the Stephen Mather Wilderness and North Cascades National Park. Its nearest higher peak is Corteo Peak, 2.33 mi (3.75 km) to the northwest. Precipitation runoff from Rainy Peak drains into Rainy Lake and tributaries of Bridge Creek. The retreating Lyall Glacier in its north cirque contributes to waterfalls which tumble 1,000 ft (300 m) into Rainy Lake.

== Climate ==
Rainy Peak is located in the marine west coast climate zone of western North America. Weather fronts coming off the Pacific Ocean travel east toward the Cascade Mountains. As fronts approach the North Cascades, they are forced upward by the peaks (orographic lift), causing them to drop their moisture in the form of rain or snow onto the Cascades. As a result, the west side of the North Cascades experiences high precipitation, especially during the winter months in the form of snowfall. Because of maritime influence, snow tends to be wet and heavy, resulting in high avalanche danger. During winter months, weather is usually cloudy, but due to high pressure systems over the Pacific Ocean that intensify during summer months, there is often little or no cloud cover during the summer.

== Geology ==
The North Cascades feature some of the most rugged topography in the Cascade Range with craggy peaks and ridges and deep glacial valleys. Geological events occurring many years ago created the diverse topography and drastic elevation changes over the Cascade Range leading to the various climate differences.

The history of the formation of the Cascade Mountains dates back millions of years ago to the late Eocene Epoch. With the North American Plate overriding the Pacific Plate, episodes of volcanic igneous activity persisted. In addition, small fragments of the oceanic and continental lithosphere called terranes created the North Cascades about 50 million years ago.

During the Pleistocene period dating back over two million years ago, glaciation advancing and retreating repeatedly scoured the landscape leaving deposits of rock debris. The U-shaped cross section of the river valleys is a result of recent glaciation. Uplift and faulting in combination with glaciation have been the dominant processes which have created the tall peaks and deep valleys of the North Cascades area.

== Gallery ==
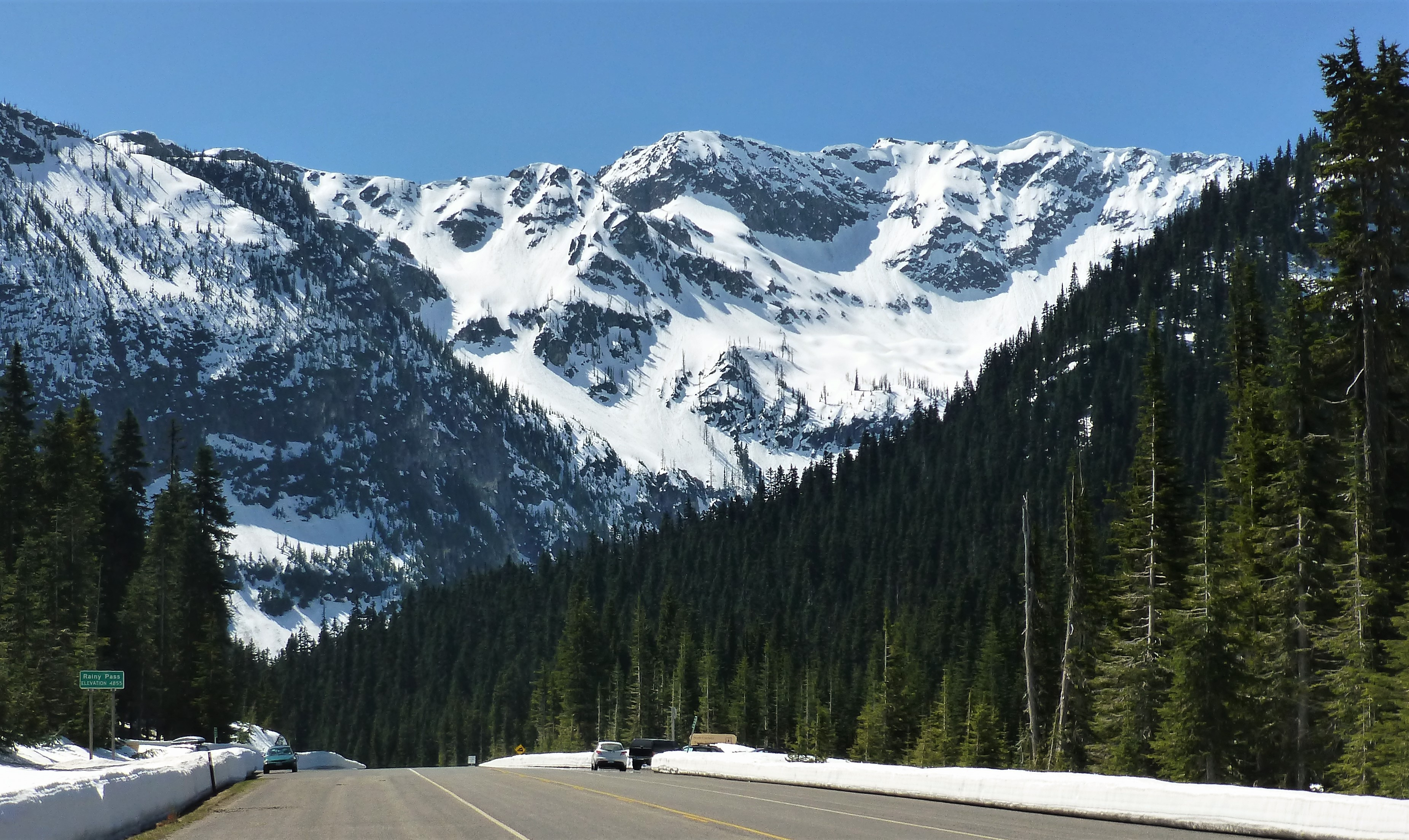
Rainy Peak from Rainy Pass

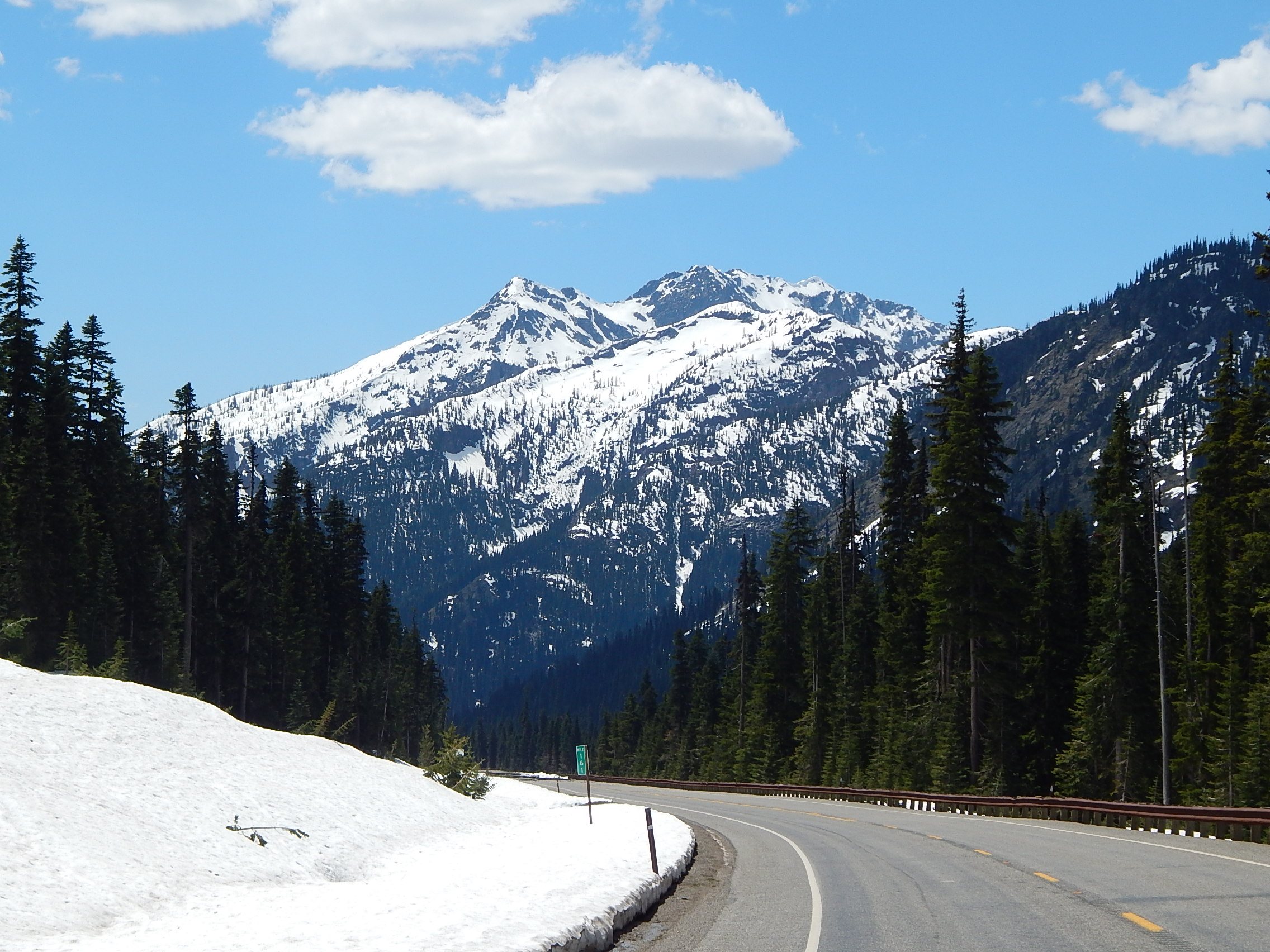
Rainy Peak from Highway 20

== See also ==
- Geography of the North Cascades
