= Mount Benzarino =

Mountain in Washington (state), United States

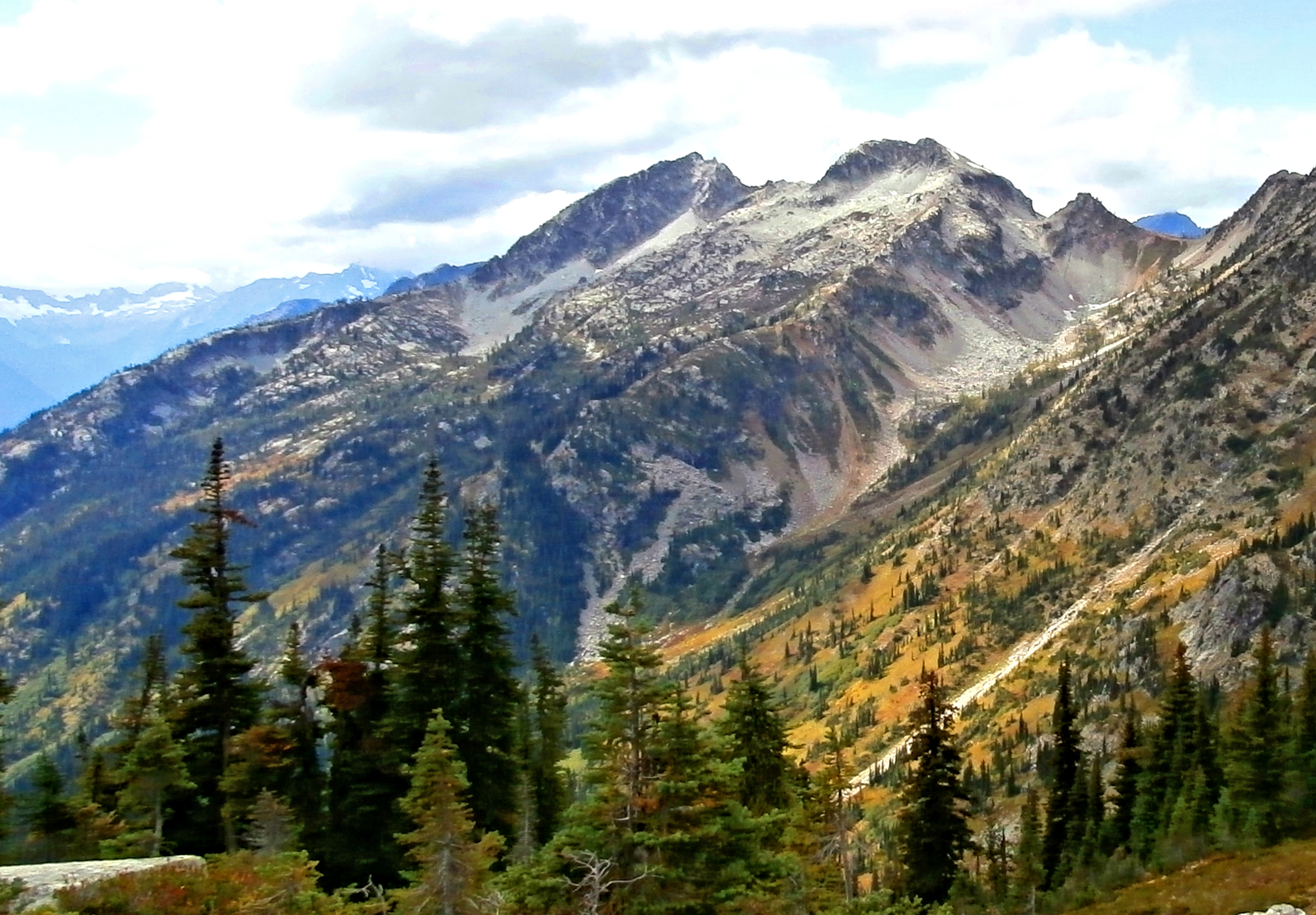
- Benzarino's east aspect seen from Maple Pass Trail

Highest point
- Elevation: 7,760 ft (2,370 m)
- Prominence: 720 ft (220 m)
- Parent peak: Corteo Peak (8,080 ft)
- Isolation: 1.66 mi (2.67 km)
- Coordinates: 48°29′23″N 120°49′02″W

Geography
- Location within Washington (state) Location within the United States
- Interactive map of Mount Benzarino
- Country: United States
- State: Washington
- County: Chelan
- Protected area: North Cascades National Park
- Parent range: North Cascades
- Topo map: USGS McGregor Mountain

Geology
- Rock age: Eocene to Late Cretaceous
- Rock type: Tonalitic Orthogneiss

Climbing
- First ascent: 1926, Lage Wernstedt
- Easiest route: class 3 scrambling

Mount Benzarino is a 7,760+ ft (2,370+ m) mountain summit located in North Cascades National Park, in Chelan County of Washington state. It is situated in the North Cascades, a subset of the Cascade Range. The nearest higher neighbor is Corteo Peak, 1.67 miles (2.69 km) to the northeast, and Black Peak is set 2.34 miles (3.77 km) to the north.

Corteo Peak and Mount Benzarino were named by Forest Service surveyor, Lage Wernstedt, for the names of Basque sheepherders he met near these two mountains. Lage Wernstedt made the first ascent of Benzarino in 1926. Remnants of a small glacier hang on its north flank, and precipitation runoff from the mountain drains into tributaries of Bridge Creek, which in turn is a tributary of the Stehekin River.

== Climate ==
Mount Benzarino is located in the marine west coast climate zone of western North America. Most weather fronts originating in the Pacific Ocean travel northeast toward the Cascade Mountains. As fronts approach the North Cascades, they are forced upward by the peaks of the Cascade Range (orographic lift), causing them to drop their moisture in the form of rain or snowfall onto the Cascades. As a result, the North Cascades experience high precipitation, especially during the winter months in the form of snowfall. Because of maritime influence, snow tends to be wet and heavy, resulting in high avalanche danger. During winter months, weather is usually cloudy, but, due to high pressure systems over the Pacific Ocean that intensify during summer months, there is often little or no cloud cover during the summer.

== Geology ==
The North Cascades features some of the most rugged topography in the Cascade Range with craggy peaks, ridges, and deep glacial valleys. The history of the formation of the Cascade Mountains dates back millions of years ago to the late Eocene Epoch. With the North American Plate overriding the Pacific Plate, episodes of volcanic igneous activity persisted. In addition, small fragments of the oceanic and continental lithosphere called terranes created the North Cascades about 50 million years ago.

During the Pleistocene period dating back over two million years ago, glaciation advancing and retreating repeatedly scoured the landscape leaving deposits of rock debris. The U-shaped cross section of the river valleys is a result of recent glaciation. Uplift and faulting in combination with glaciation have been the dominant processes which have created the tall peaks and deep valleys of the North Cascades area.

== Gallery ==
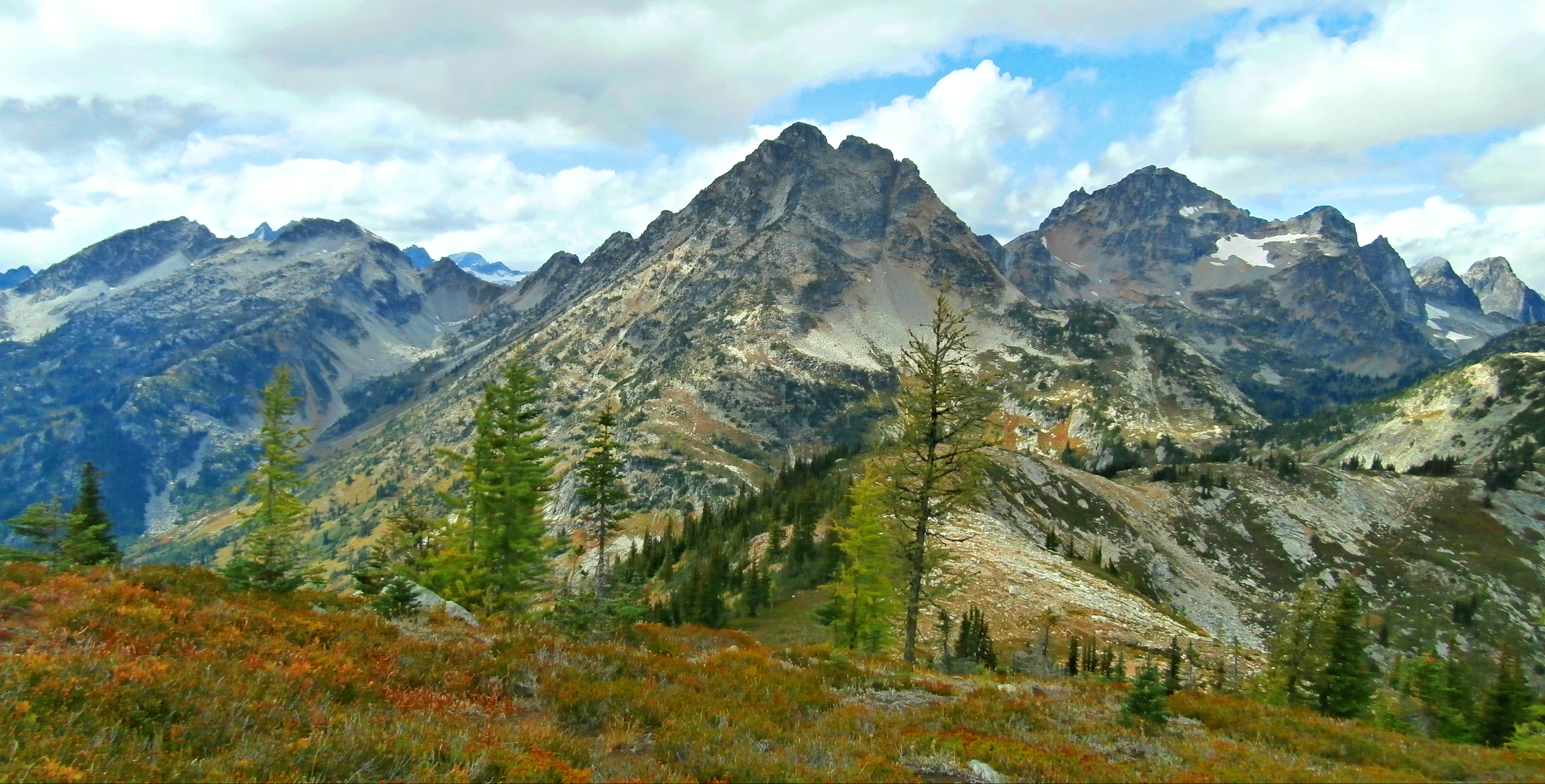
View from Maple Pass Trail with Benzarino (left), Corteo Peak (center), and Black Peak (right)

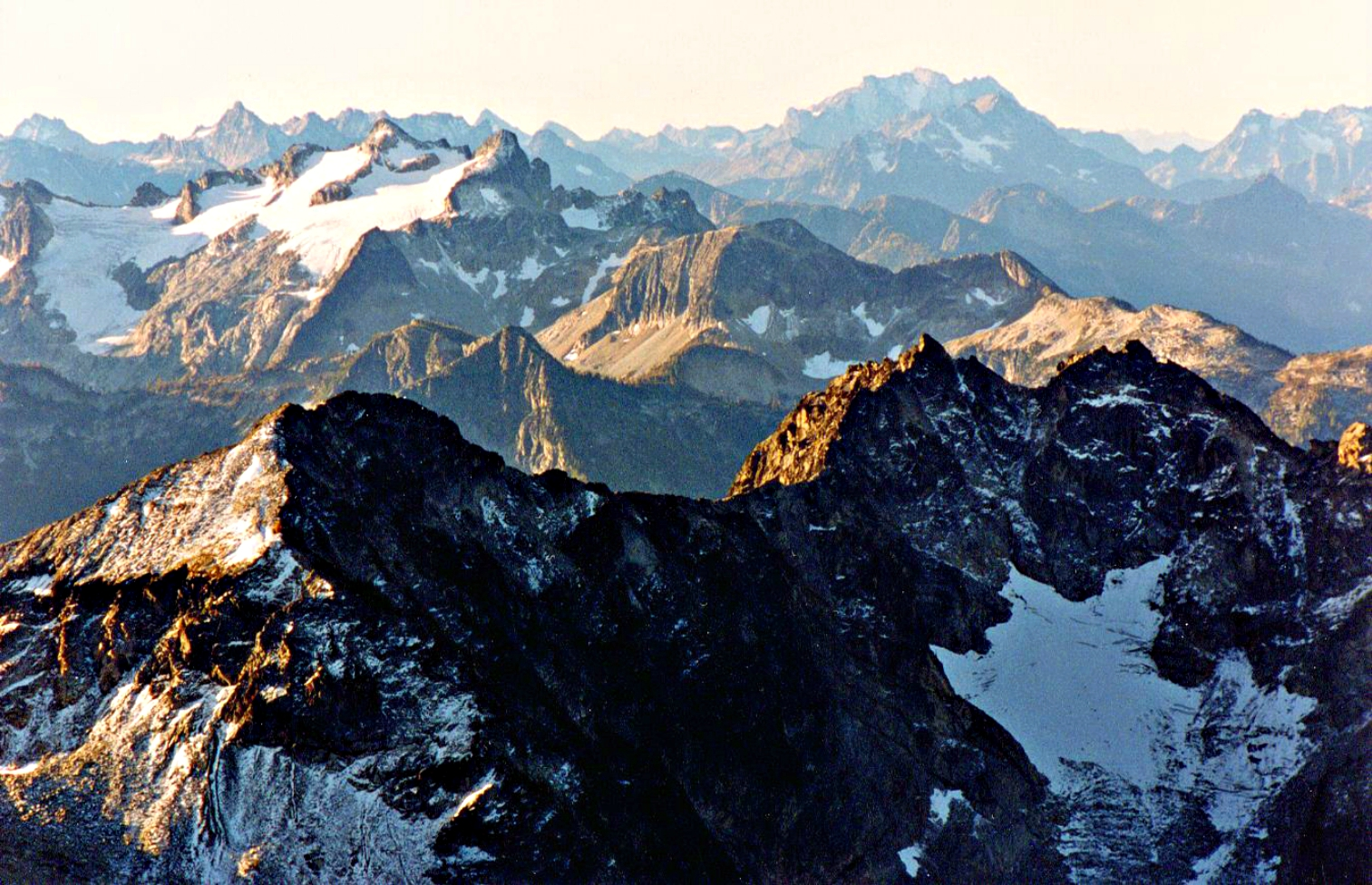
Mt. Benzarino in lower half of frame, seen from Black Peak. Note small glacier below summit. (McGregor Mountain in upper left)

== See also ==
- Geography of the North Cascades
- List of mountain peaks of Washington (state)
