= Frisco Mountain =

Mountain in Washington (state), United States

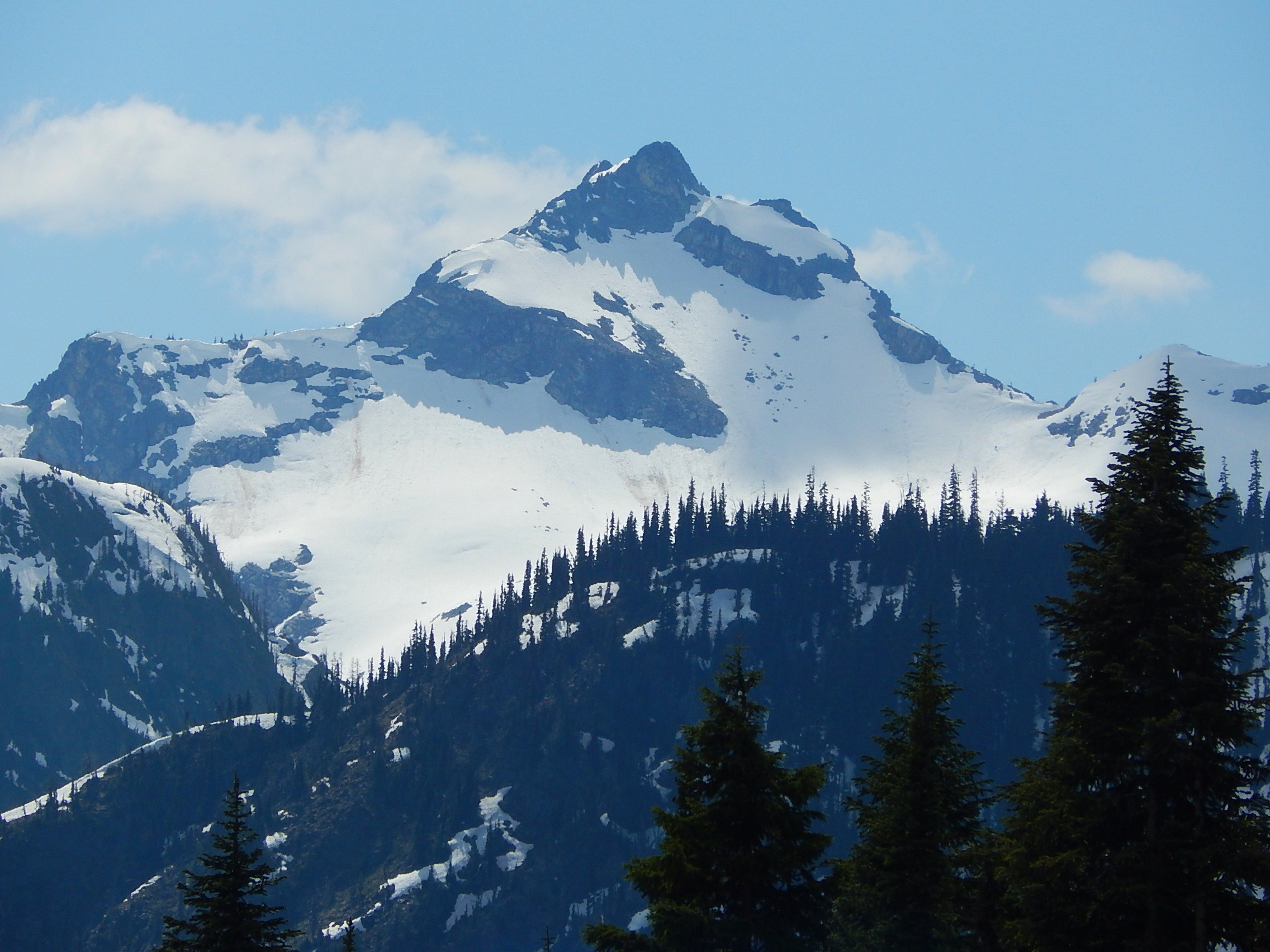
- Frisco Mountain from North Cascades Highway

Highest point
- Elevation: 7,760 ft (2,365 m)
- Prominence: 485 ft (148 m)
- Parent peak: Corteo Peak
- Isolation: 0.54 mi (0.87 km)
- Coordinates: 48°29′20″N 120°45′25″W

Geography
- Location within Washington (state) Location within the United States
- Interactive map of Frisco Mountain
- Country: United States
- State: Washington
- County: Chelan
- Protected area: North Cascades National Park
- Parent range: North Cascades
- Topo map: USGS McGregor Mountain

Geology
- Rock age: Late Cretaceous
- Rock type: Tonalitic pluton

Climbing
- First ascent: 1926, Lage Wernstedt
- Easiest route: Scrambling

Frisco Mountain is a 7,760-foot (2,365-metre) mountain summit in the Cascade Range in the U.S. state of Washington. It is located two miles southwest of Rainy Pass on the borders of the Stephen Mather Wilderness and North Cascades National Park. First climbed by surveyor Lage Wernstedt in 1926, the mountain derives its name from a mining claim on the south side (Bridge Creek side) that was worked in the 1920s. Its nearest higher peak is Rainy Peak, 0.54 mi (0.87 km) to the east-southeast. Precipitation runoff from Frisco Mountain drains into Rainy Lake and tributaries of Bridge Creek. The retreating Lyall Glacier in its northeast cirque contributes to waterfalls which tumble 1,000 ft (300 m) into Rainy Lake.

== Climate ==
Frisco Mountain is located in the marine west coast climate zone of western North America. Weather fronts originating in the Pacific Ocean travel northeast toward the Cascade Mountains. As fronts approach the North Cascades, they are forced upward by the peaks of the Cascade Range (orographic lift), causing them to drop their moisture in the form of rain or snowfall onto the Cascades. As a result, the west side of the North Cascades experiences high precipitation, especially during the winter months in the form of snowfall. Because of maritime influence, snow tends to be wet and heavy, resulting in high avalanche danger. During winter months, weather is usually cloudy, but, due to high pressure systems over the Pacific Ocean that intensify during summer months, there is often little or no cloud cover during the summer.

== Geology ==
The North Cascades feature some of the most rugged topography in the Cascade Range with craggy peaks and ridges and deep glacial valleys. Geological events occurring many years ago created the diverse topography and drastic elevation changes over the Cascade Range leading to the various climate differences.

The history of the formation of the Cascade Mountains dates back millions of years ago to the late Eocene Epoch. With the North American Plate overriding the Pacific Plate, episodes of volcanic igneous activity persisted. In addition, small fragments of the oceanic and continental lithosphere called terranes created the North Cascades about 50 million years ago.

During the Pleistocene period dating back over two million years ago, glaciation advancing and retreating repeatedly scoured the landscape leaving deposits of rock debris. The U-shaped cross section of the river valleys is a result of recent glaciation. Uplift and faulting in combination with glaciation have been the dominant processes which have created the tall peaks and deep valleys of the North Cascades area.

== Gallery ==
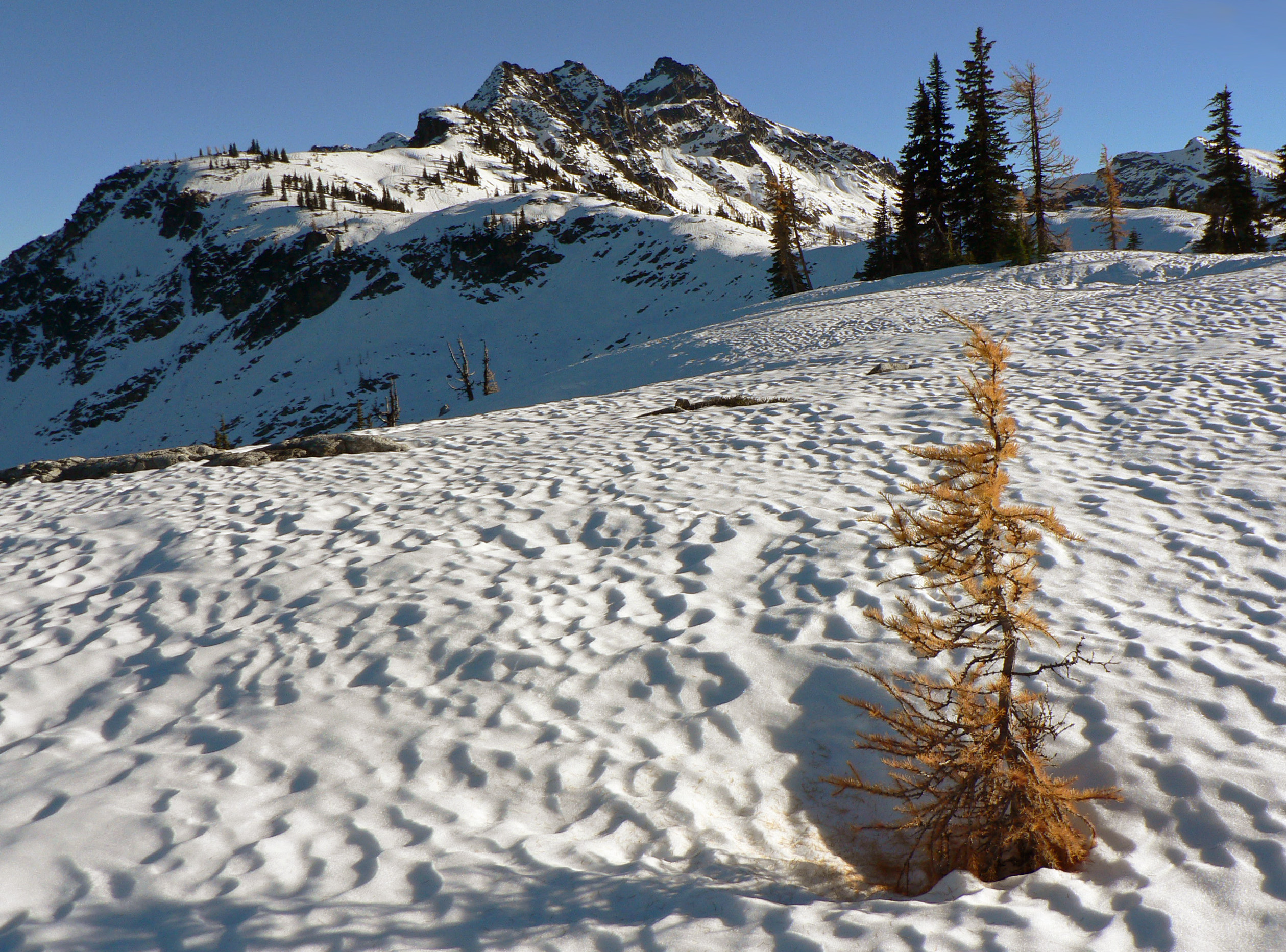
Frisco Mountain from Maple Pass area

== See also ==
- Geography of Washington (state)
- Geology of the Pacific Northwest
