= Lyall Glacier =

Glacier in the state of Washington

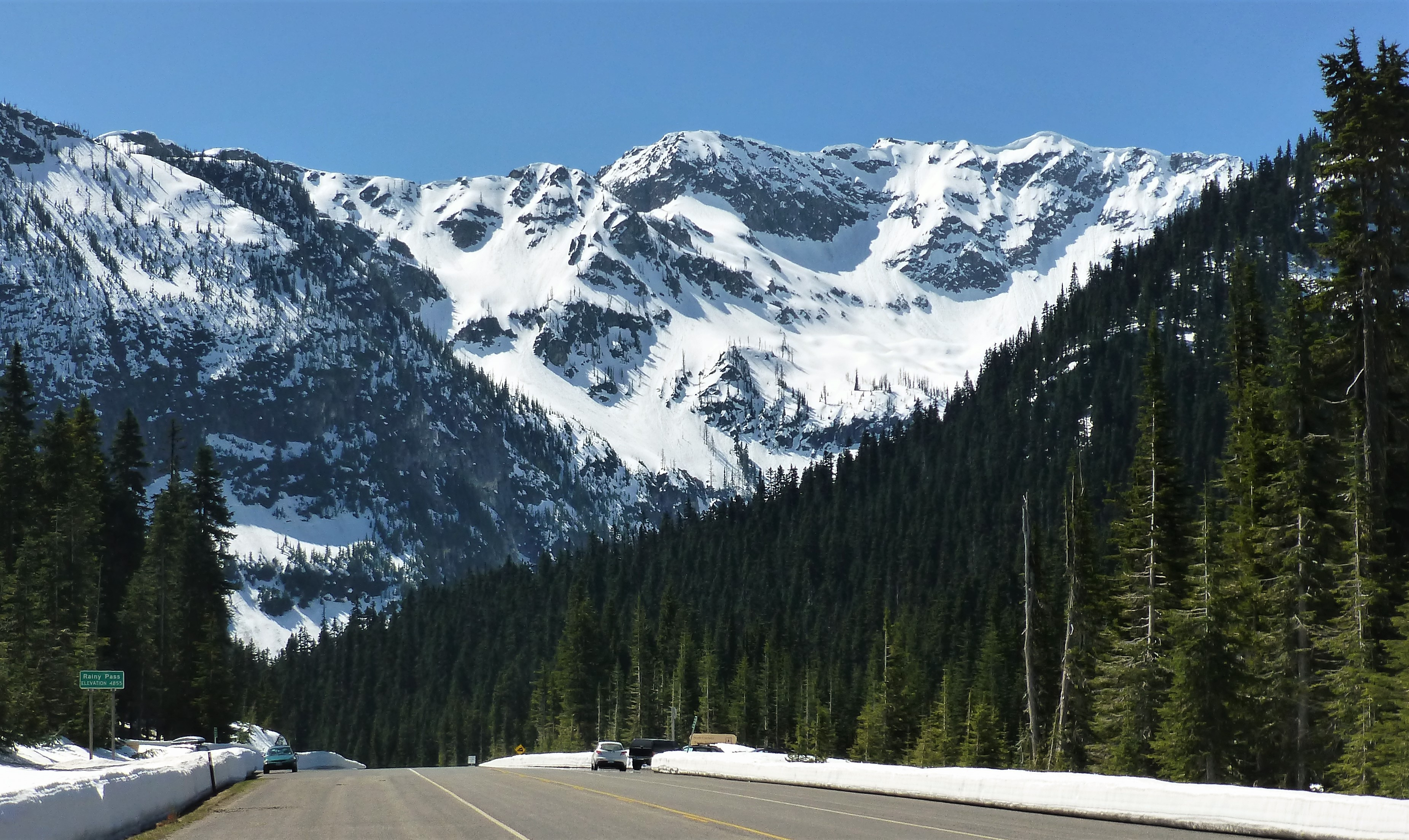
- Lyall Glacier in the cirque north of Rainy Peak viewed in 2013 from Rainy Pass in winter

- Location within Washington (state) Location within the United States
- Type: Mountain glacier
- Location: Chelan County, Washington; United States
- Coordinates: 48°29′16″N 120°44′50″W
- Length: 0.20 miles (0.32 km)
- Terminus: Talus
- Status: Retreating/Extinct

Lyall Glacier is within the Wenatchee National Forest in Chelan County, Washington, United States, and is just southeast of Frisco Mountain. It occupies the north cirque on Rainy Peak. Melt from Lyall Glacier contributes to waterfalls which tumble 1,000 ft (300 m) into Rainy Lake.

Lyall Glacier is now said to have disappeared.

== See also ==
- List of glaciers in the United States
