= Sandalee Glacier =

Glacier in Washington, U.S.

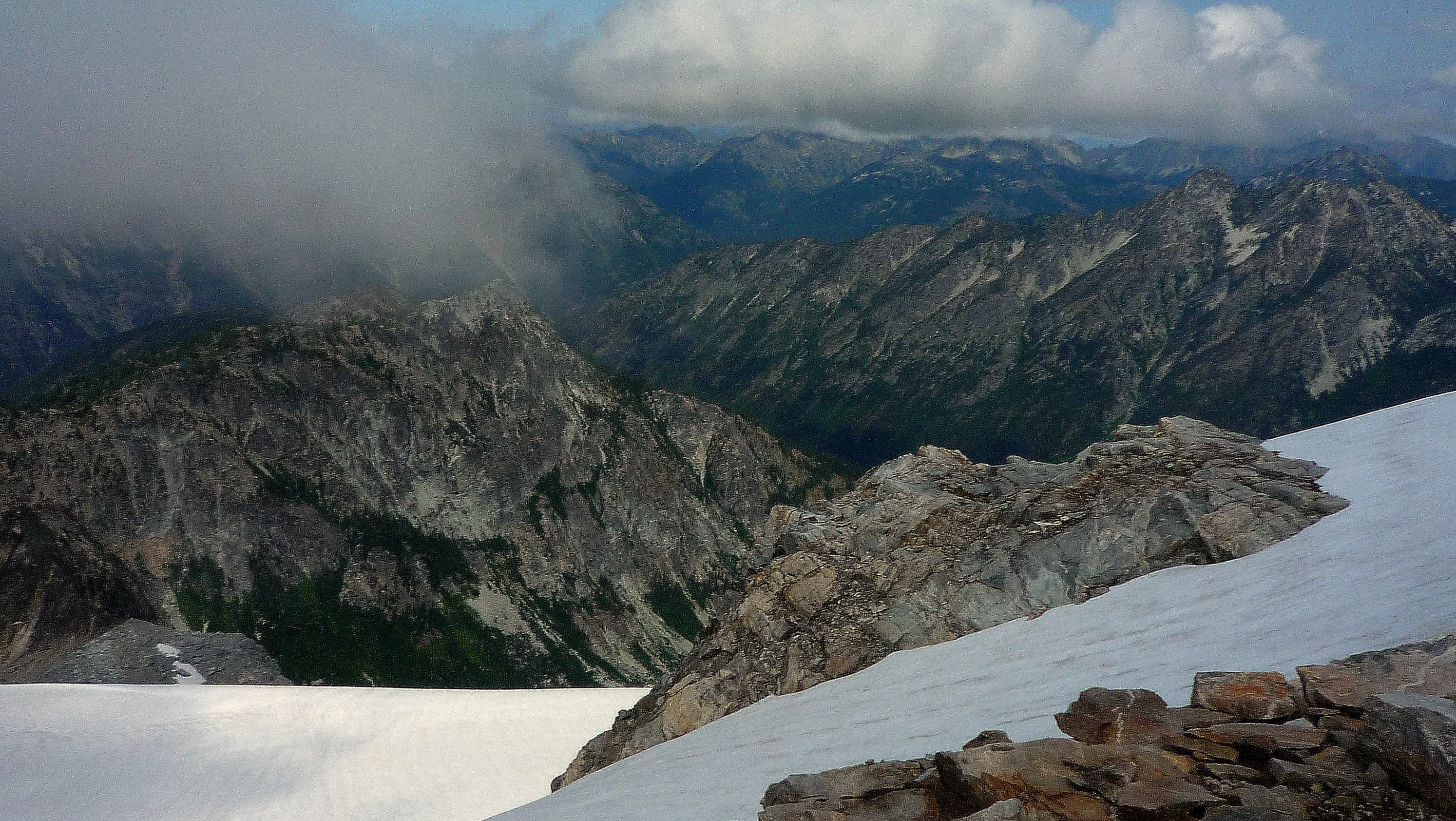
- Portions of the Sandalee Glacier

- Location within Washington (state)
- Type: Cirque glacier
- Location: Chelan County, Washington, U.S.
- Coordinates: 48°24′31″N 120°47′18″W
- Length: .45 mi (0.72 km)
- Terminus: Barren rock
- Status: Retreating

Sandalee Glacier is in North Cascades National Park and Lake Chelan National Recreation Area in the U.S. state of Washington, on the north and east slopes of McGregor Mountain. Sandalee Glacier originates in several cirques and extends from 7,800 to 6,800 ft (2,400 to 2,100 m) above sea level across a distance of almost 1.5 mi (2.4 km). In 1993, the Sandalee Glacier had an area of 2 km^{2}. The National Park Service is currently studying Sandalee Glacier as part of their glacier monitoring project. Between 1993 (when monitoring began) and 2013 the glacier lost ~6 m of thickness.

== See also ==
- List of glaciers in the United States
