= Corteo Peak =

Mountain in Washington (state), United States

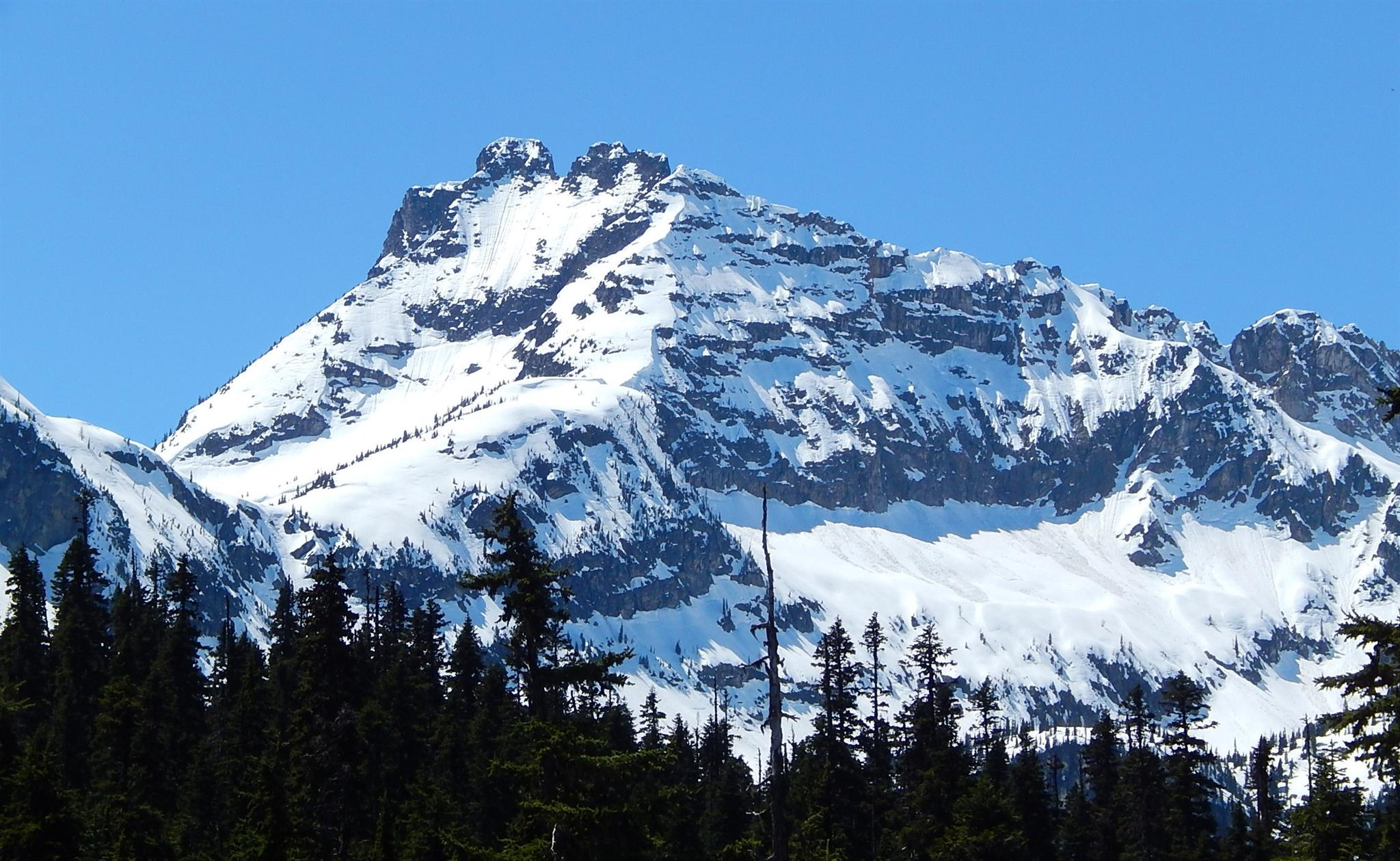
- Corteo Peak seen from North Cascades Highway

Highest point
- Elevation: 8,107 ft (2,471 m)
- Prominence: 652 ft (199 m)
- Parent peak: Black Peak (8,970 ft)
- Isolation: 1.67 mi (2.69 km)
- Coordinates: 48°30′16″N 120°47′18″W

Geography
- Location within Washington (state) Location within the United States
- Interactive map of Corteo Peak
- Country: United States
- State: Washington
- County: Chelan
- Protected area: North Cascades National Park; Stephen Mather Wilderness
- Parent range: North Cascades
- Topo map: USGS Mount Arriva

Geology
- Rock age: Late Cretaceous
- Rock type: Tonalitic pluton

Climbing
- First ascent: July 1935, John Lehmann and Hermann Ulrichs
- Easiest route: Scrambling, class 4

Corteo Peak is an 8,107-foot (2,471-metre) mountain summit located on the eastern boundary line of North Cascades National Park in Washington state. It is situated west of Rainy Pass in the North Cascades Range. Remnants of the retreating Lewis Glacier hang on its north flank. Topographic relief is significant as the summit rises approximately 3,200 feet (980 meters) above Maple Creek in one mile (1.6 km) and 2,400 feet (730 meters) above Lewis Lake in one-half mile (0.8 km). The nearest higher peak is Black Peak, 1.67 miles (2.69 km) to the northwest. Corteo Peak and nearby Mount Benzarino were named by Forest Service surveyor, Lage Wernstedt, after Basque sheepherders he met near these two mountains.

== Climate ==
Corteo Peak is located in the marine west coast climate zone of western North America. Most weather fronts originating in the Pacific Ocean travel northeast toward the Cascade Mountains. As fronts approach the North Cascades, they are forced upward by the peaks of the Cascade Range (orographic lift), causing them to drop their moisture in the form of rain or snowfall onto the Cascades. As a result, the west side of the North Cascades experiences high precipitation, especially during the winter months in the form of snowfall. Because of maritime influence, snow tends to be wet and heavy, resulting in high avalanche danger. During winter months, weather is usually cloudy, but due to high pressure systems over the Pacific Ocean that intensify during summer months, there is often little or no cloud cover during the summer.

== Geology ==
The North Cascades features some of the most rugged topography in the Cascade Range with craggy peaks, ridges, and deep glacial valleys. The history of the formation of the Cascade Mountains dates back millions of years ago to the late Eocene Epoch. With the North American Plate overriding the Pacific Plate, episodes of volcanic igneous activity persisted. In addition, small fragments of the oceanic and continental lithosphere called terranes created the North Cascades about 50 million years ago.

During the Pleistocene period dating back over two million years ago, glaciation advancing and retreating repeatedly scoured the landscape leaving deposits of rock debris. The U-shaped cross section of the river valleys is a result of recent glaciation. Uplift and faulting in combination with glaciation have been the dominant processes which have created the tall peaks and deep valleys of the North Cascades area.

== Gallery ==
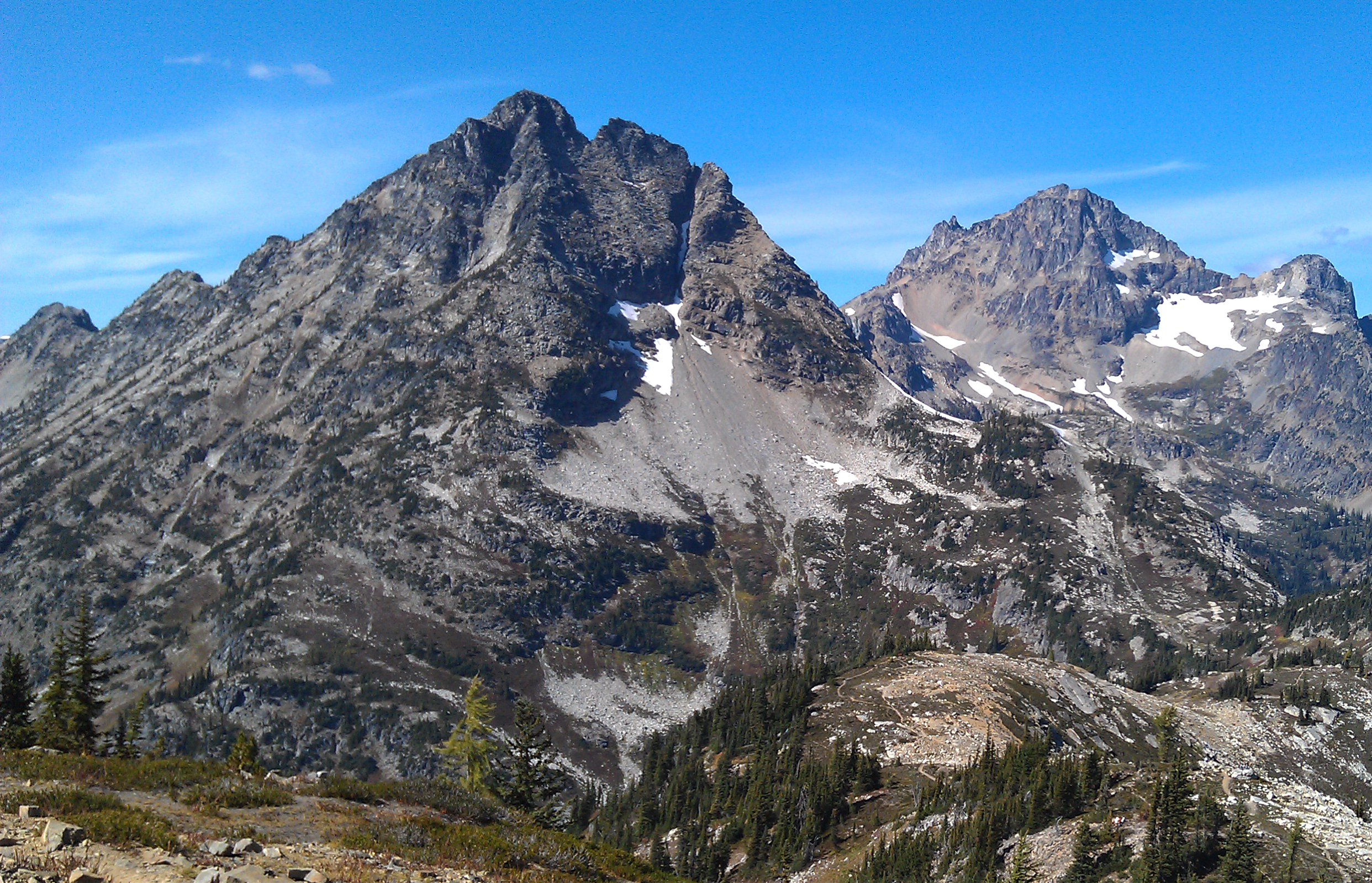
Corteo Peak and Black Peak (right) seen from Maple Pass loop trail

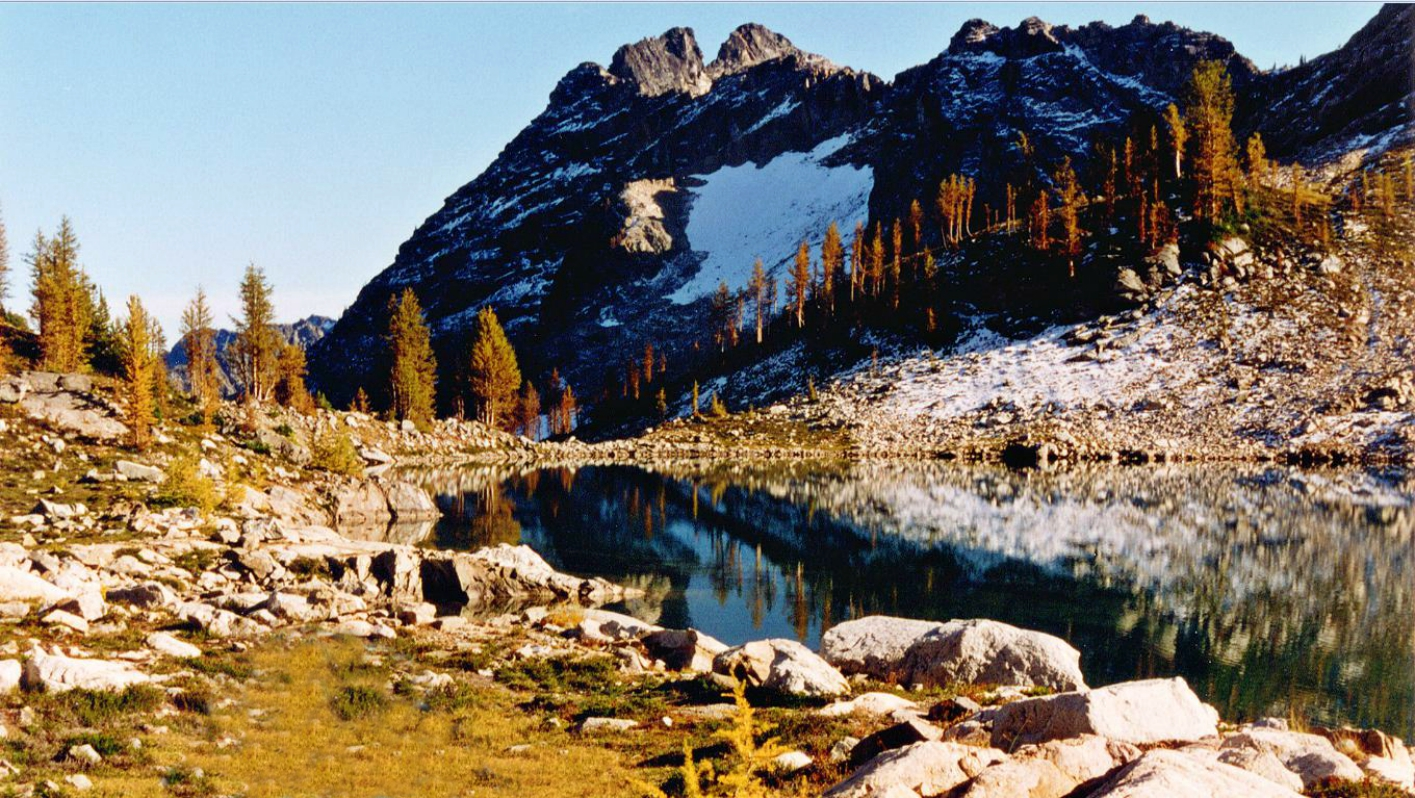
Corteo Peak seen from Wing Lake

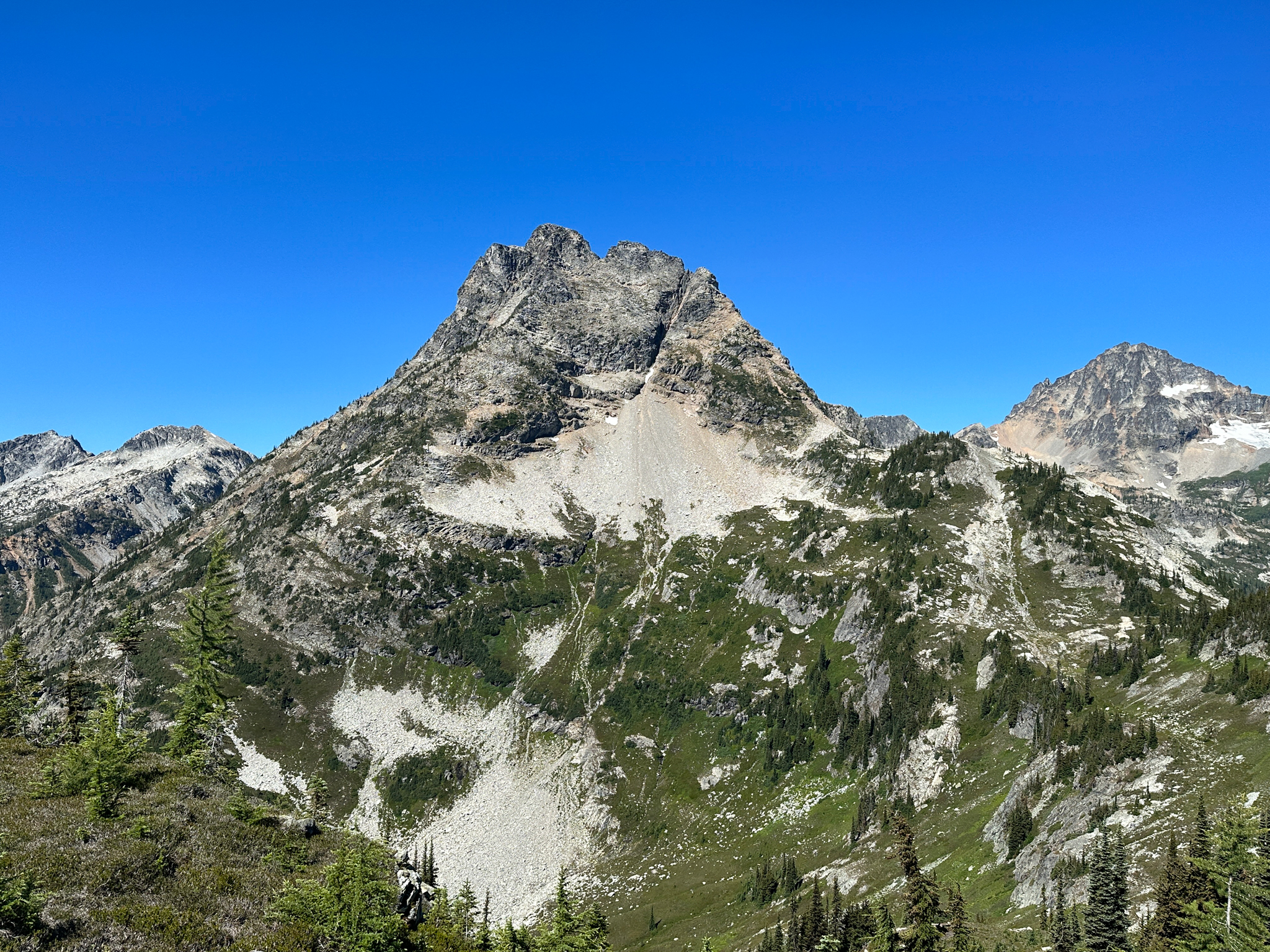

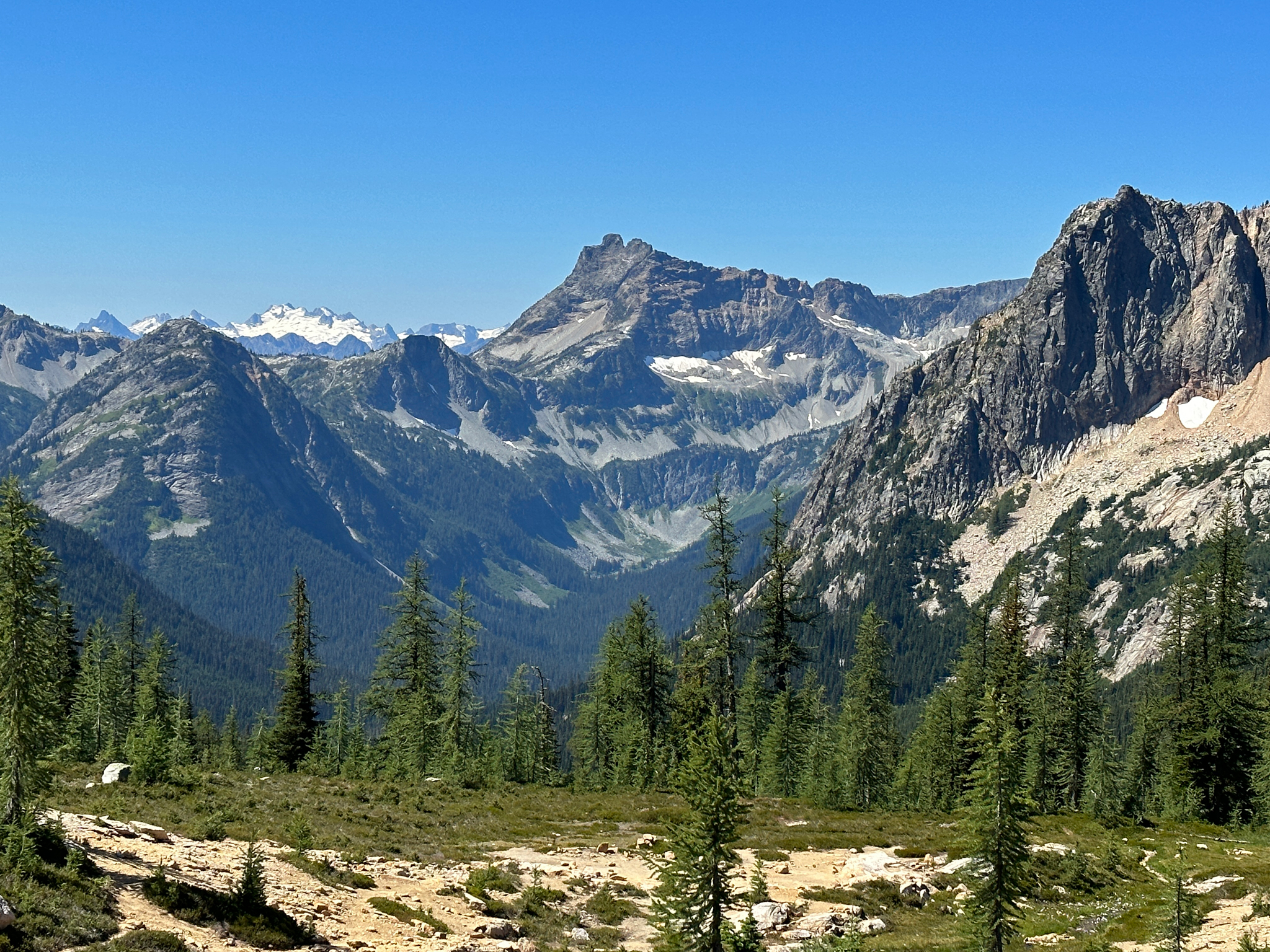
Corteo Peak centered

== See also ==
- Geography of the North Cascades
- List of mountain peaks of Washington (state)
