= Black Peak (Washington) =

Mountain in Washington (state), United States

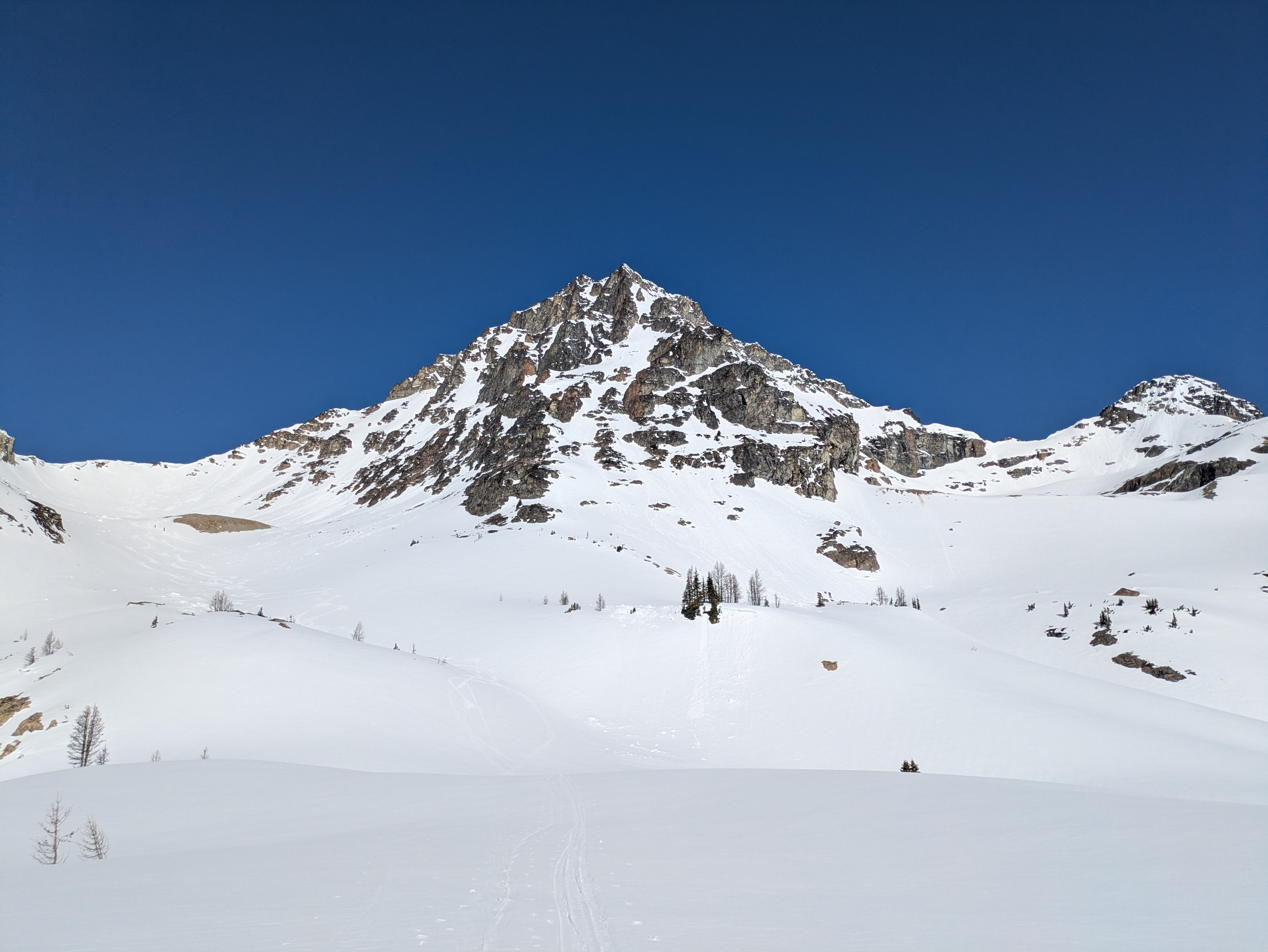
- Black Peak viewed from near Wing Lake

Highest point
- Elevation: 8,975 ft (2,736 m) NAVD 88
- Prominence: 3,450 ft (1,050 m)
- Isolation: 5.2 mi (8.4 km)
- Coordinates: 48°31′25″N 120°48′58″W

Geography
- Location within Washington (state)
- Location: Border of Chelan and Skagit Counties, Washington, United States
- Parent range: Cascade Range
- Topo map: USGS Mount Arriva quadrangle

Climbing
- First ascent: 1926, Lage Wernstedt

Black Peak is a tall peak in the Cascade Range in the U.S. state of Washington. It lies in the Stephen Mather Wilderness and North Cascades National Park. At 8,975 feet (2,736 m) in elevation it is the 20th-highest peak in Washington. Black Peaks's prominence is 3,450 feet (1,050 m), making it the 35th-most prominent peak in Washington. The nearest higher peak is Goode Mountain, 5.2 miles (8.4 km) to the west-southwest.

== History ==
The first ascent of this peak was made in 1926 by US Forest Service surveyor, Lage Wernsterdt. He also gave it the name Black Peak. In 1983, there was a proposal to rename the peak "Mount Wernstedt" in his honor, but was later withdrawn.

== Geology ==
The North Cascades features some of the most rugged topography in the Cascade Range with craggy peaks, granite spires, ridges, and deep glacial valleys. Geological events occurring many years ago created the diverse topography and drastic elevation changes over the Cascade Range leading to various climate differences.

The history of the formation of the Cascade Mountains dates back millions of years ago to the late Eocene Epoch. With the North American Plate overriding the Pacific Plate, episodes of volcanic igneous activity persisted. In addition, small fragments of the oceanic and continental lithosphere called terranes created the North Cascades about 50 million years ago.

During the Pleistocene period dating back over two million years ago, glaciation advancing and retreating repeatedly scoured the landscape leaving deposits of rock debris. The U-shaped cross section of the river valleys is a result of recent glaciation. Uplift and faulting in combination with glaciation have been the dominant processes which have created the tall peaks and deep valleys of the North Cascades area.

== Climate ==
Most weather fronts originate in the Pacific Ocean, and travel northeast toward the Cascade Mountains. As fronts approach the North Cascades, they are forced upward by the peaks of the Cascade Range, causing them to drop their moisture in the form of rain or snowfall onto the Cascades (Orographic lift). As a result, the west side of the North Cascades experiences higher precipitation than the east side, especially during the winter months in the form of snowfall. During winter months, weather is usually cloudy, but, due to high pressure systems over the Pacific Ocean that intensify during summer months, there is often little or no cloud cover during the summer.

== See also ==
- List of mountains of the United States
- List of mountains by elevation
