= National Register of Historic Places listings in North Cascades National Park =

This is a list of the National Register of Historic Places listings in North Cascades National Park.

This is intended to be a complete list of the properties and districts on the National Register of Historic Places in North Cascades National Park, Washington, United States. The locations of National Register properties and districts for which the latitude and longitude coordinates are included below, may be seen in a Google map.

There are 16 properties listed on the National Register in the park.

This National Park Service list is complete through NPS recent listings posted June 20, 2025.

== Current listings ==
	Name on the Register	Image	Date listed	Location	City or town	Description
1	Backus-Marblemount Ranger Station House No. 1009	Backus-Marblemount Ranger Station House No. 1009	February 10, 1989 (#88003462)	Ranger Station Rd., 1 mi. N of WA 20; 48°32′26″N 121°26′55″W	Marblemount	
2	Backus-Marblemount Ranger Station House No. 1010	Backus-Marblemount Ranger Station House No. 1010	February 10, 1989 (#88003463)	Ranger Station Rd., 1 mi. N of WA 20; 48°32′27″N 121°26′57″W	Marblemount	
3	Beaver Pass Shelter	Beaver Pass Shelter	February 10, 1989 (#88003448)	Beaver Pass, 14 mi (23 km). W of Ross Lake; 48°52′20″N 121°14′56″W	Diablo	
4	Black Warrior Mine		October 15, 1974 (#74000914)	At end of Horseshoe Basin Trail, about 20.5 miles (33.0 km) northwest of Stehekin; 48°28′47″N 121°01′29″W	Stehekin	
5	Bridge Creek Cabin-Ranger Station		February 10, 1989 (#88003458)	In Bridge Creek Campground, southwest of Stehekin Valley Trail, about 13 miles (21 km) northwest of Stehekin; 48°25′47″N 120°52′22″W	Stehekin	
6	Bridge Creek Shelter	Bridge Creek Shelter	February 10, 1989 (#88003445)	In Bridge Creek Campground, north of Stehekin Valley Trail, about 12.8 miles (20.6 km) northwest of Stehekin; 48°25′48″N 120°52′05″W	Stehekin	
7	Copper Mountain Fire Lookout	Copper Mountain Fire Lookout	February 10, 1989 (#88003446)	On Copper Mountain, 10 mi (16 km). E of Hannegan Campground; 48°54′33″N 121°27′41″W	Newhalem	
8	Gilbert's Cabin	Gilbert's Cabin	February 10, 1989 (#88003453)	Cascade River Rd. W of Gilbert Creek; 48°29′19″N 121°05′20″W	Stehekin	
9	High Bridge Shelter	High Bridge Shelter	February 10, 1989 (#88003461)	In High Bridge Campground, off Stehekin Valley Road, about 9.7 miles (15.6 km) northwest of Stehekin; 48°22′52″N 120°50′21″W	Stehekin	
10	International Boundary US-Canada Monuments		February 10, 1989 (#88003450)	Along US-Canada border between eastern boundary of Ross Lake NRA and western boundary of North Cascades National Park; 49°00′04″N 121°31′19″W	Hozomeen	
11	Perry Creek Shelter	Perry Creek Shelter	February 10, 1989 (#88003447)	On Little Beaver Trail, 5 mi (8.0 km). W of Ross Lake; 48°55′16″N 121°09′21″W	Hozomeen	
12	Rock Cabin	Rock Cabin	February 10, 1989 (#88003457)	Fisher Creek Trail S of Diablo Lake; 48°34′42″N 120°59′47″W	Diablo	
13	Sourdough Mountain Lookout	Sourdough Mountain Lookout	February 10, 1989 (#88003449)	On Sourdough Mountain, 5 mi (8.0 km). NE of Diablo; 48°44′34″N 121°06′29″W	Diablo	
14	Sulphide-Frisco Cabin	Sulphide-Frisco Cabin	February 10, 1989 (#88003459)	Along Bridge Creek Trail, about 11.5 miles (18.5 km) north of Stehekin; 48°28′20″N 120°42′46″W	Stehekin	
15	Swamp-Meadow Cabin (east)	Swamp-Meadow Cabin (east)	February 10, 1989 (#88003456)	Thunder Creek Trail S of Diablo Lake; 48°34′44″N 121°01′05″W	Diablo	
16	Swamp-Meadow Cabin (west)	Swamp-Meadow Cabin (west)	February 10, 1989 (#88003455)	Thunder Creek Trail S of Diablo Lake; 48°34′44″N 121°01′05″W	Diablo	

== See also ==
- National Register of Historic Places listings in Whatcom County, Washington
- National Register of Historic Places listings in Skagit County, Washington
- National Register of Historic Places listings in Chelan County, Washington
- National Register of Historic Places listings in Washington
