= National Register of Historic Places listings in Skagit County, Washington =

Location of Skagit County in Washington

This is a list of the National Register of Historic Places listings in Skagit County, Washington.

This is intended to be a complete list of the properties and districts on the National Register of Historic Places in Skagit County, Washington, United States. Latitude and longitude coordinates are provided for many National Register properties and districts; these locations may be seen together in a map.

There are 32 properties and districts listed on the National Register in the county. Another property was once listed but has been removed.

This National Park Service list is complete through NPS recent listings posted August 21, 2026.

== Current listings ==
	Name on the Register	Image	Date listed	Location	City or town	Description
1	Anacortes Public Library	Anacortes Public Library	October 21, 1977 (#77001357)	1305 8th St. 48°30′56″N 122°36′59″W	Anacortes	Carnegie Libraries of Washington TR (AD)
2	Backus-Marblemount Ranger Station House No. 1009	Backus-Marblemount Ranger Station House No. 1009	February 10, 1989 (#88003462)	Ranger Station Rd., 1 mi. N of WA 20; 48°32′25″N 121°26′56″W	Marblemount	
3	Backus-Marblemount Ranger Station House No. 1010	Backus-Marblemount Ranger Station House No. 1010	February 10, 1989 (#88003463)	Ranger Station Rd., 1 mi. N of WA 20; 48°32′28″N 121°26′51″W	Marblemount	
4	Baker River Bridge	Baker River Bridge	May 4, 1976 (#76001906)	On WA 17A, over Baker River; 48°32′28″N 121°44′34″W	Concrete	Historic Bridges and Tunnels in Washington TR
5	Bethsaida Swedish Evangelical Lutheran Church Parsonage	Bethsaida Swedish Evangelical Lutheran Church Parsonage	December 6, 1990 (#90001863)	1754 Chilberg Rd., Pleasant Ridge; 48°23′29″N 122°26′32″W	La Conner	
6	Burlington Carnegie Library	Burlington Carnegie Library	August 3, 1982 (#82004286)	901 Fairhaven St. 48°28′33″N 122°19′18″W	Burlington	Carnegie Libraries of Washington TR
7	Burrows Island Light Station	Burrows Island Light Station	August 9, 2024 (#100010694)	Far western shore of Burrows Island; 48°28′41″N 122°42′49″W	Anacortes vicinity	
8	California Fruit Store	California Fruit Store	November 5, 1987 (#87001949)	909 Third St. 48°31′13″N 122°36′37″W	Anacortes	
9	Causland Park	Causland Park	May 7, 1981 (#81000589)	8th St. and M Ave. 48°30′59″N 122°36′55″W	Anacortes	
10	Deception Pass	Deception Pass	July 16, 1982 (#82004285)	Rte. 20; 48°24′31″N 122°38′37″W	Anacortes	Historic Bridges and Tunnels in Washington TR, also extends into Island County
11	Deception Pass State Park-Rosario and Bowman Bathing, Picnic, and Caretaker's Areas Historic District	Deception Pass State Park-Rosario and Bowman Bathing, Picnic, and Caretaker's Areas Historic District	December 4, 2019 (#100004772)	Bowman Bay Road; 48°25′06″N 122°39′09″W	Dewey	
12	Fraternal Order of Eagles Hall-Anacortes	Fraternal Order of Eagles Hall-Anacortes	December 19, 2019 (#100004790)	901 Seventh St. 48°31′00″N 122°36′41″W	Anacortes	
13	Gilbert's Cabin	Gilbert's Cabin	February 10, 1989 (#88003453)	Cascade River Rd. W of Gilbert Creek; 48°29′19″N 121°05′20″W	Stehekin	
14	Great Northern Depot	Great Northern Depot	November 5, 1987 (#87001935)	R Ave. & Seventh St. 48°31′02″N 122°36′28″W	Anacortes	
15	Hidden Lake Peak Lookout	Hidden Lake Peak Lookout	July 14, 1987 (#87001184)	Mt. Baker Ranger District, Southernmost peak of Hidden Lake Peaks near North Cascades National Park boundary 48°29′44″N 121°12′15″W	Marblemount	
16	Hoogdal School	Hoogdal School	October 11, 2024 (#100010917)	22159 Grip Road; 48°33′30″N 122°15′31″W	Sedro-Woolley	
17	La Conner Historic District	La Conner Historic District	April 24, 1974 (#74001977)	Roughly bounded by 2nd, Morris and Commercial Sts., and Snohomish Channel; 48°23′25″N 122°29′46″W	La Conner	
18	LA MERCED	LA MERCED	April 17, 1990 (#90000588)	Anacortes Waterfront off Oakes Ave. 48°30′42″N 122°38′45″W	Anacortes	A schooner built in 1917; only its hull survives, as a breakwater for Lovric's boatyard on the north coast of Anacortes.
19	Lincoln Theater and Commercial Block	Lincoln Theater and Commercial Block	November 5, 1987 (#87001987)	301-329 Kincaid St. & 710-740 First St. 48°25′04″N 122°20′14″W	Mount Vernon	
20	Lower Baker River Hydroelectric Power Plant	Lower Baker River Hydroelectric Power Plant	July 17, 1990 (#88002736)	Baker River at S end of Shannan Lake; 48°32′53″N 121°44′24″W	Concrete	
21	Marine Supply and Hardware Complex	Marine Supply and Hardware Complex	November 5, 1987 (#87001943)	202-218 Commercial Ave. & 1009 Second St. 48°31′14″N 122°36′42″W	Anacortes	
22	Birdsey D. Minkler House	Birdsey D. Minkler House	December 1, 1988 (#88002745)	8405 S. Main St. 48°31′30″N 122°03′34″W	Lyman	Became Town Hall in 2009. Renumbered from 201 S. Main St.
23	Northern State Hospital	Northern State Hospital	December 20, 2010 (#10001043)	Roughly bounded by Thompson Dr. to the south, Hemlick Dr. to the east, Hub Dr. to the west, and 1/4 mile south of Mosier Rd. to the north. 48°31′50″N 122°12′24″W	Sedro-Woolley	
24	President Hotel	President Hotel	December 13, 2010 (#10001021)	310 Myrtle St. 48°25′07″N 122°20′17″W	Mount Vernon	
25	Rock Cabin	Rock Cabin	February 10, 1989 (#88003457)	Fisher Creek Trail S of Diablo Lake; 48°34′42″N 120°59′47″W	Diablo	
26	Semar Block	Semar Block	November 5, 1987 (#87001967)	501 Q Ave. 48°31′07″N 122°36′33″W	Anacortes	Demolished in 1999, now a parking lot.
27	Skagit City School	Skagit City School	July 15, 1977 (#77001358)	3.5 mi. S of Mount Vernon on Moore Rd. 48°22′12″N 122°21′59″W	Mount Vernon	
28	Swamp-Meadow Cabin East	Swamp-Meadow Cabin East	February 10, 1989 (#88003456)	Thunder Creek Trail S of Diablo Lake; 48°34′44″N 121°01′05″W	Diablo	
29	Swamp-Meadow Cabin West	Swamp-Meadow Cabin West	February 10, 1989 (#88003455)	Thunder Creek Trail S of Diablo Lake; 48°34′44″N 121°01′05″W	Diablo	
30	US Post Office-Sedro Woolley Main	US Post Office-Sedro Woolley Main	August 7, 1991 (#91000655)	111 Woodworth St. 48°30′16″N 122°14′18″W	Sedro-Woolley	
31	W. T. PRESTON (snagboat)	W. T. PRESTON (snagboat)	March 16, 1972 (#72001270)	Anacortes waterfront, R Ave., at foot of 7th St. 48°30′59″N 122°36′29″W	Anacortes	
32	Wilson Hotel	Wilson Hotel	December 15, 2004 (#04001369)	804 Commercial Ave. 48°31′03″N 122°36′47″W	Anacortes	The hotel was designed by Pickles and Sutton of Tacoma, built of bricks from See's Brickyard of Anacortes. The style is Romanesque with masticated stone bases, rounded windows and Roman arches. The hotel was added to in 1927. Recently, the Wilson underwent complete restoration & earthquake retrofitting. The work was completed in 2007. The Wilson currently features retail on the main floor and low income housing on the upper floors.

== Former listings ==
	Name on the Register	Image	Date listed	Date removed	Location	City or town	Description
1	Curtis Wharf	Curtis Wharf	November 10, 1987 (#87001941)	November 10, 1998	Jct. of O Ave. & Second St.	Anacortes	

== See also ==
- List of National Historic Landmarks in Washington (state)
- National Register of Historic Places listings in Washington state
