= Bridge House =

Bridge House may refer to:

== United Kingdom and Crown dependencies ==
- Bridge House Estates, the body responsible for the bridges over the Thames bordering the City of London
- Bridge House, a Grade I listed building built over Stock Ghyll in Ambleside, Westmorland
- Bridge House, Castletown, Isle of Man, a registered building in the Isle of Man and the former home of Quayle's Bank
- Bridge House, a building in MediaCityUK, Salford, occupied by the BBC

== United States ==
- Bridge House (Albany, Georgia), listed on the NRHP in Georgia
- Bridges House, a name for the New Hampshire Governor's Mansion in Concord
- Bridge Creek Cabin-Ranger Station, Stehekin, Washington, listed on the NRHP in Chelan County, Washington
- Bridge Creek Shelter, Stehekin, Washington, listed on the NRHP in Washington

== Canada ==
- William Alexander House (Bridge House), a Registered Heritage Structure in Bonavista Bay, Newfoundland and Labrador, and the oldest documented house in the province

== Schools ==
- Bridge House School, Western Cape province, South Africa
- Bridge House College, Ikoyi, Lagos, Nigeria
