= Perry Creek Shelter =

- U.S. National Register of Historic Places
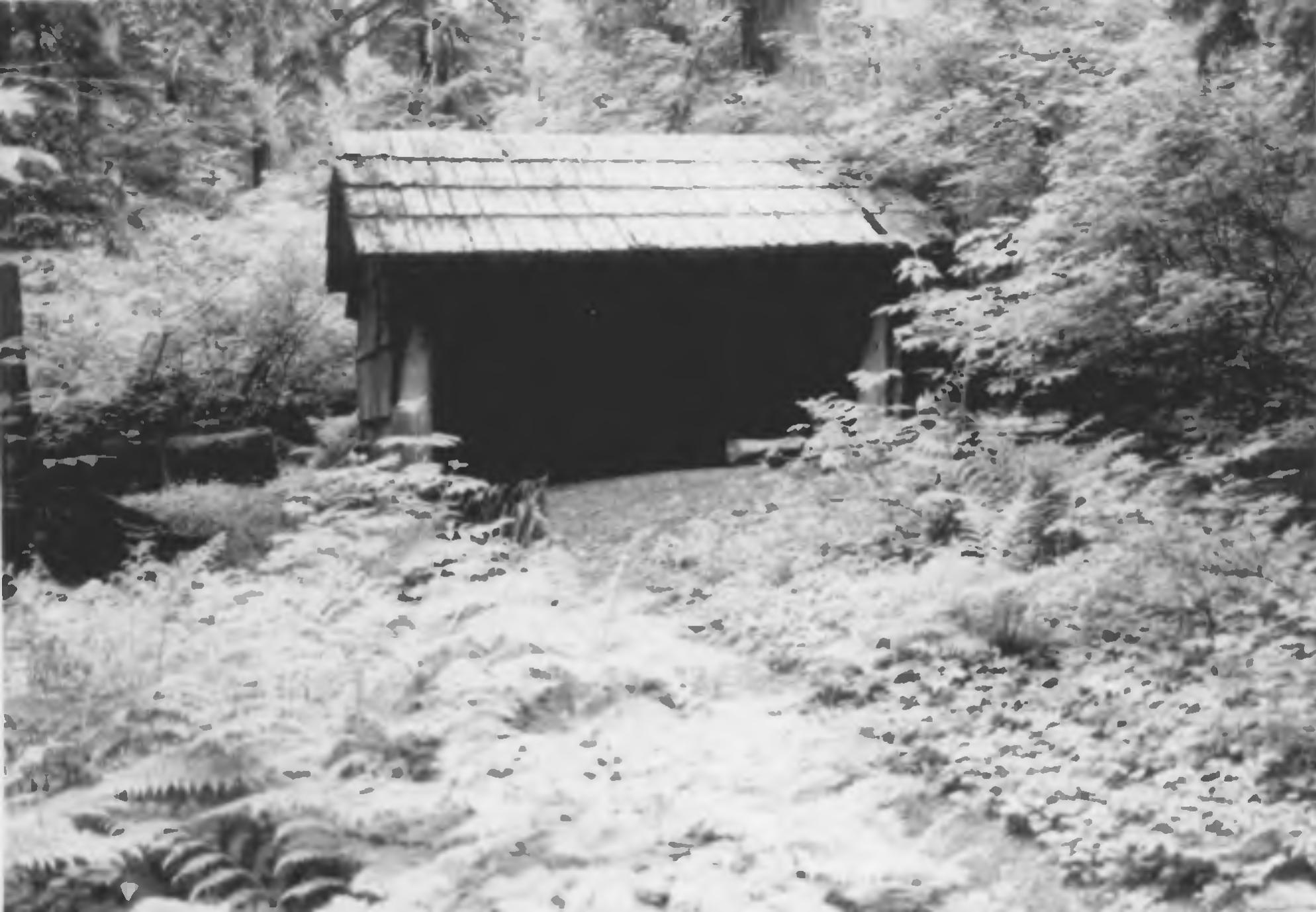
- Perry Creek Shelter

- Location within Washington (state)
- Nearest city: Hozomeen, Washington
- Coordinates: 48°55′16″N 121°09′21″W
- Area: less than one acre
- Built: 1937
- MPS: North Cascades National Park Service Complex MRA
- NRHP reference No.: 88003447
- Added to NRHP: February 10, 1989

The Perry Creek Shelter is in North Cascades National Park, in the U.S. state of Washington. Constructed by United States Forest Service employee Fred Berry in 1937, the shelter was inherited by the National Park Service when North Cascades National Park was dedicated in 1968. The shelter was placed on the National Register of Historic Places in 1989.

Perry Creek Shelter is a wood-framed structure, sheathed in wood shake siding on three sides, and open to the front which faces south. The shelter is 16.5 ft (5.0 m) wide at front and 12 ft (3.7 m) deep. The front roofline extends above the ridgeline, somewhat overhanging the back shed roof. The shelter is located 5 mi (8.0 km) west of Ross Lake on the north side of the Little Beaver Trail.
