= International Boundary US–Canada Monuments =

- International Boundary US-Canada Monuments
- U.S. National Register of Historic Places
- Location within Washington (state)
- Nearest city: Stehekin, Washington
- Coordinates: 49°0′0.8″N 121°3′50.7″W
- Area: less than one acre
- Built: 1906
- MPS: North Cascades National Park Service Complex MRA
- NRHP reference No.: 88003450
- Added to NRHP: February 10, 1989

International Boundary US–Canada Monuments are in North Cascades National Park, in the U.S. state of Washington. The monuments were erected along the international border between the U.S. and Canada in 1906 and 1907. The original monuments, constructed between 1859 and 1860, no longer exist. A total of 17 monuments can be found along the northern border of the park.
