= Bridge Creek Shelter =

- U.S. National Register of Historic Places
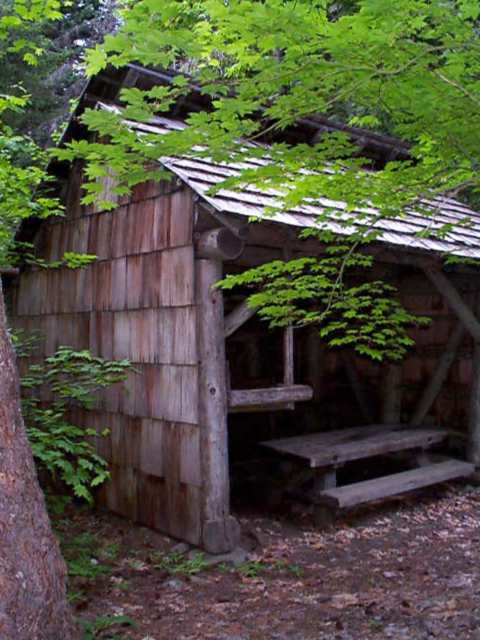

- Location within Washington (state)
- Location: In Bridge Creek Campground, southwest of Stehekin Valley Trail, about 12.8 miles (20.6 km) northwest of Stehekin, in North Cascades National Park
- Nearest city: Stehekin, Washington
- Coordinates: 48°25′48″N 120°52′05″W
- Built: c. 1938
- Architect: US Forest Service
- MPS: North Cascades National Park Service Complex MRA
- NRHP reference No.: 88003445
- Added to NRHP: February 10, 1989

The Bridge Creek Shelter is a rustic log and shingle shelter in North Cascades National Park. It was built in the 1930s by the U.S. Forest Service with Civilian Conservation Corps labor.
