= Beaver Pass Shelter =

- U.S. National Register of Historic Places
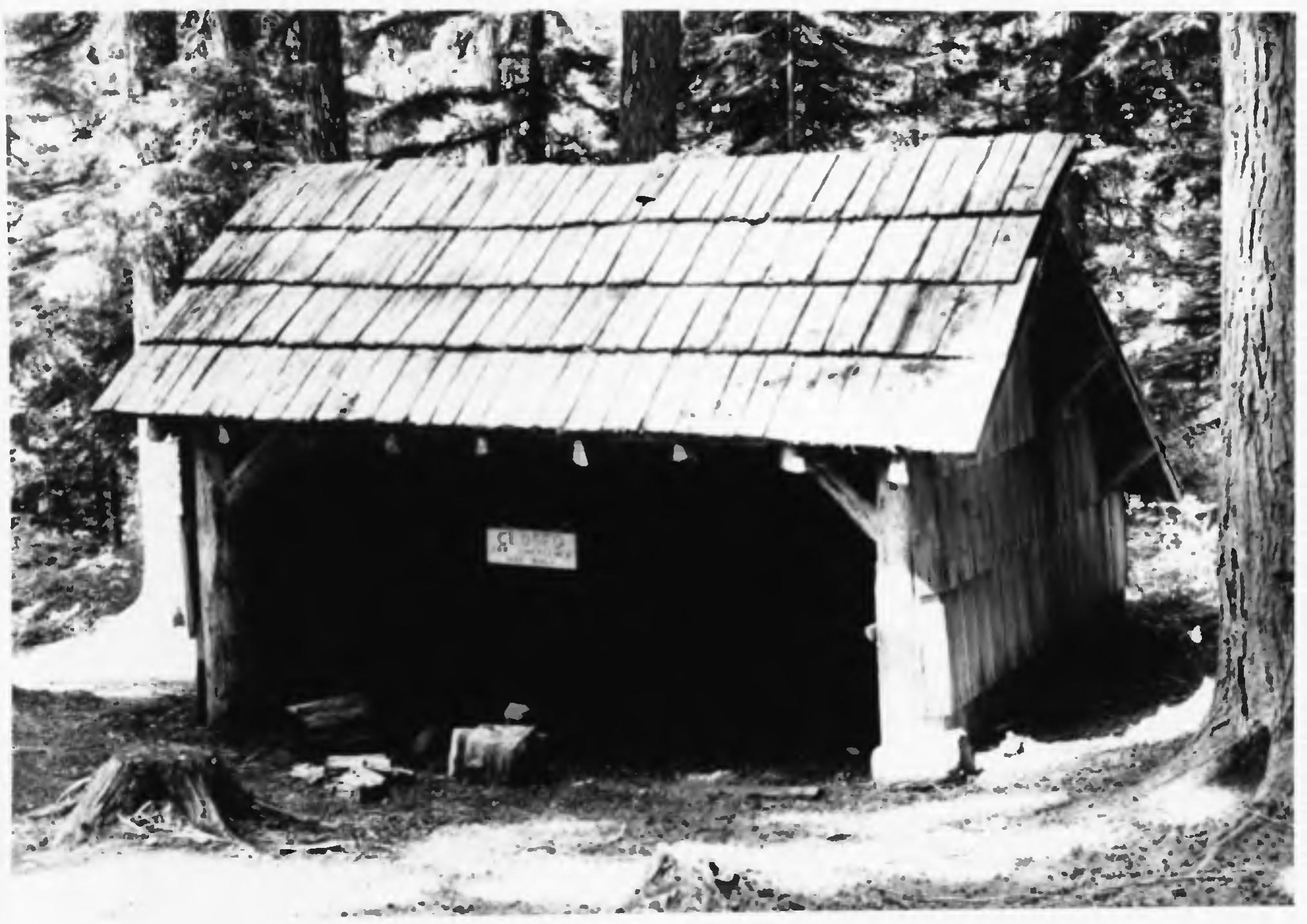
- Beaver Pass Shelter

- Location within Washington (state)
- Nearest city: Marblemount, Washington
- Coordinates: 48°52′20″N 121°14′56″W
- Area: less than one acre
- Built: 1938
- MPS: North Cascades National Park Service Complex MRA
- NRHP reference No.: 88003448
- Added to NRHP: February 10, 1989

The Beaver Pass Shelter is in North Cascades National Park, in the U.S. state of Washington. Constructed by the United States Forest Service in 1938, the shelter was inherited by the National Park Service when North Cascades National Park was dedicated in 1968. Beaver Pass Shelter was placed on the National Register of Historic Places in 1989.

Beaver Pass Shelter is a wood-framed structure, sheathed in wood shake siding on three sides, and open to the front which faces east. The shelter is 16.5 ft (5.0 m) wide at front and 12 ft (3.7 m) deep. The front roofline extends above the ridgeline, somewhat overhanging the back shed roof.
