= Gilbert's Cabin =

Historic house in Washington, United States

- U.S. National Register of Historic Places
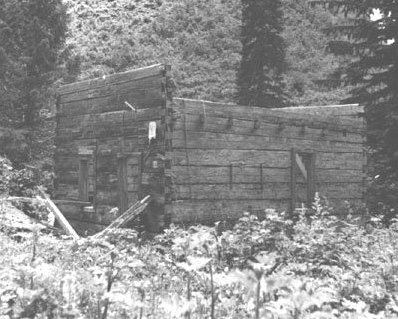
- Gilbert's Cabin in the 1950s

- Location within Washington (state)
- Nearest city: Stehekin, Washington
- Coordinates: 48°29′19″N 121°05′20″W
- Area: less than one acre
- Built: 1894
- MPS: North Cascades National Park Service Complex MRA
- NRHP reference No.: 88003453
- Added to NRHP: February 10, 1989

Gilbert's Cabin is in North Cascades National Park, in the U.S. state of Washington. Constructed by a private citizen named Gilbert Landre, the cabin was intended as a private residence and is located at the site where Landre may have built an earlier cabin in 1888. The cabin is 18 by 25 ft (5.5 by 7.6 m) and was constructed from hand-hewn planks 17 in (430 mm) in thickness. Uniquely, the cabin walls are held together with dovetail joints at the corners. Gilbert's Cabin is the only building in North Cascades National Park constructed in such a manner. Gilbert's Cabin was placed on the National Register of Historic Places in 1989.
