= Rock Cabin =

Historic house in Washington, United States

- U.S. National Register of Historic Places
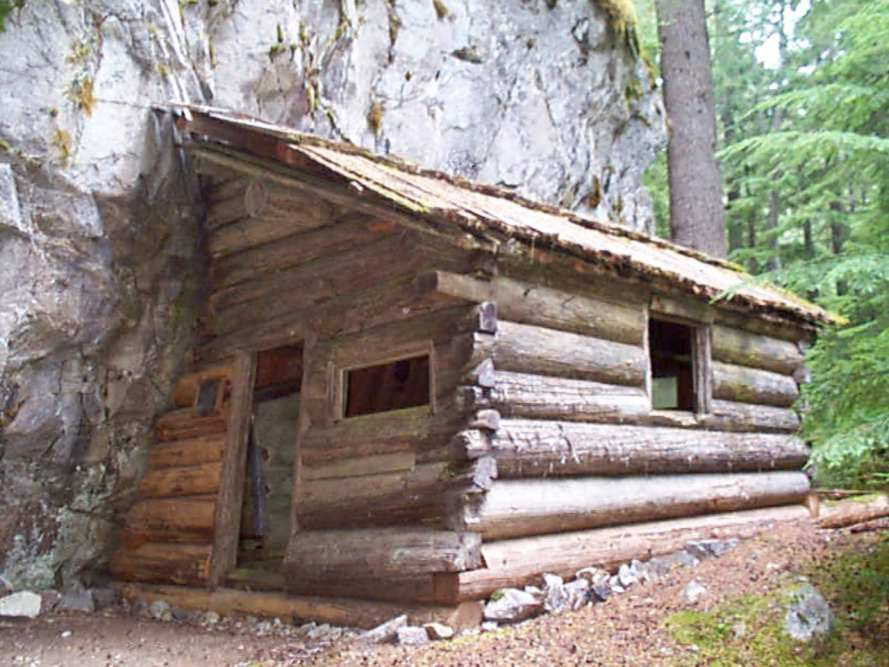
- Rock Cabin

- Location within Washington (state)
- Nearest city: Marblemount, Washington
- Coordinates: 48°34′42″N 120°59′47″W
- Area: less than one acre
- Built: 1925
- MPS: North Cascades National Park Service Complex MRA
- NRHP reference No.: 88003457
- Added to NRHP: February 10, 1989

The Rock Cabin is in North Cascades National Park, in the U.S. state of Washington. Constructed by trapper John Dayo in the 1920s, the cabin was placed on the National Register of Historic Places in 1989.

Rock Cabin is a three-sided wood cabin which was built against a cliff, with one side of the cabin being the cliff face. The cabin is 9.5 ft (2.9 m) wide at front and 15 ft (4.6 m) long. The cabin has saddle-notched corners and a wood shake roof which abuts the cliff face. The shelter is on the Fisher Creek trail.
