= Copper Mountain Fire Lookout =

- U.S. National Register of Historic Places
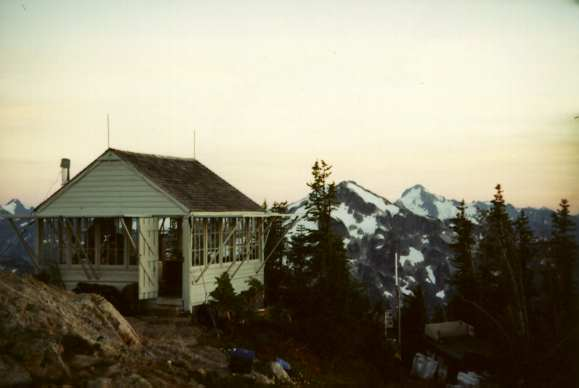

- Location within Washington (state)
- Nearest city: Newhalem, Washington
- Coordinates: 48°54′33″N 121°27′41″W
- Area: less than one acre
- Built: 1934
- MPS: North Cascades National Park Service Complex MRA
- NRHP reference No.: 88003446
- Added to NRHP: February 10, 1989

The Copper Mountain Fire Lookout was built in 1934 in what was then the Glacier Ranger district of Mount Baker National Forest. The cabin-like wood frame lookout is a frame cabin with large windows on each side protected by an awning-style shutter. A shingled gable roof with prominent lightning rods covers the cabin. The lookout measures 14.25 feet (4.34 m) by 14.25 feet (4.34 m) square. During the winter of 1943 the lookout was staffed by the Aircraft Warning Service and used to watch for enemy aircraft. It is one of three lookouts remaining in North Cascades National Park from the Forest Service administration.

The Copper Mountain Fire Lookout was placed on the National Register of Historic Places on February 10, 1989.
