= North Cascades National Park =

National Park in Washington, United States

- IUCN category II (national park)
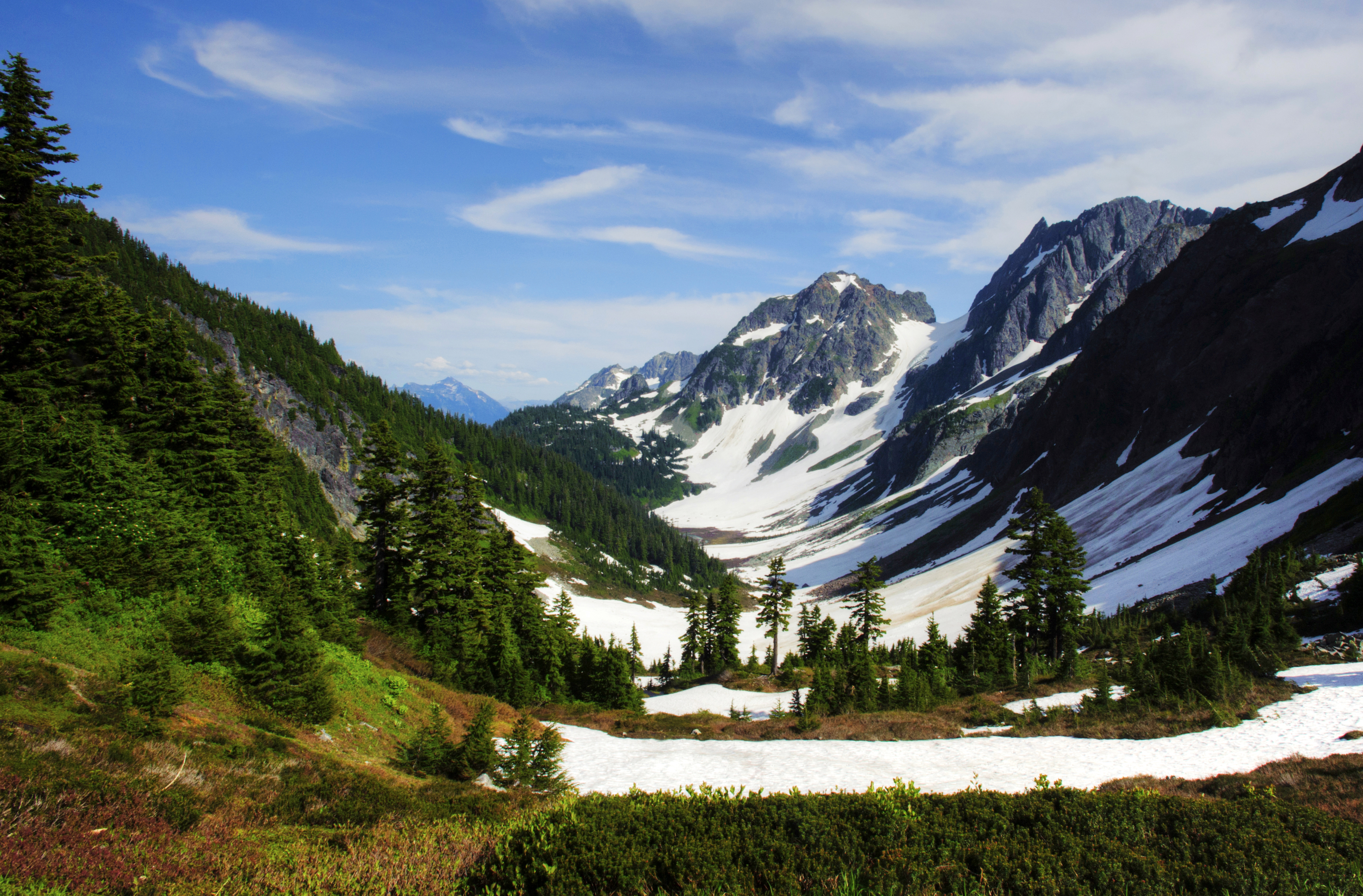
- Cascade Pass and Pelton Basin
- Interactive map of North Cascades National Park
- Location: Whatcom, Skagit, and Chelan counties, Washington, United States
- Nearest city: Sedro-Woolley, Washington
- Coordinates: 48°49′58″N 121°20′51″W
- Area: 504,654 acres (2,042.26 km^{2})
- Established: October 2, 1968
- Visitors: 16,485 (in 2024)
- Governing body: National Park Service
- Website: North Cascades National Park

North Cascades National Park is a national park of the United States in Washington. At more than 500,000 acres (200,000 ha), it is the largest of the three National Park Service units that comprise the North Cascades National Park Complex. North Cascades National Park consists of a northern and southern section, bisected by the Skagit River that flows through the reservoirs of Ross Lake National Recreation Area. Lake Chelan National Recreation Area lies on the southern border of the south unit of the park. In addition to the two national recreation areas, other protected lands including several national forests and wilderness areas, as well as Canadian provincial parks in British Columbia, nearly surround the park. North Cascades National Park features the rugged mountain peaks of the North Cascades Range, the most expansive glacial system in the contiguous United States, the headwaters of numerous waterways, and vast forests with the highest degree of flora biodiversity of any American national park.

The region was first settled by Paleo-Indians; by the time European American explorers arrived, it was inhabited by Skagit tribes. By the early 19th century, the region was visited by fur trappers and several British and American companies vied for control over the fur trade. After the Canada–United States border was set at the 49th parallel in 1846, explorers came to chart potential routes through the mountains for roads and railroads. Limited mining and logging occurred from the late 19th century to the early 20th century. The first significant human impact in the region occurred in the 1920s when several dams were built in the Skagit River valley to generate hydroelectric power. Environmentalists then campaigned to preserve the remaining wilderness, culminating on October 2, 1968, with the designation of North Cascades National Park.

Heavy snows and a high risk of avalanches due to the steep terrain, especially on the western slopes, severely limit visitation in the winter. Most access to the park is from State Route 20, which follows the Skagit River, though even this road is closed for months at a time in the winter. Most of the plant and animal species native to the park region are still found there, though climate change and pollutants from industrialized regions to the west pose risks to the environment. The park has one of the earliest and longest lasting research programs dedicated to studying climate change, primarily through examining the effects of glacial retreat.

North Cascades National Park is almost entirely protected as wilderness, and so the park has few structures, roads or other improvements. Visitors wishing to drive to a campground must do so in the adjacent national forests or national recreation areas. Camping inside the park requires hiking in by trail, horseback or boat, and camping is regulated by a permit system to ensure the wilderness is not over-exploited. Mountaineering is popular in the park and only unobtrusive clean climbing is allowed.

== Human history ==
=== Paleoindians and Native Americans ===
Human history in North Cascades National Park and the surrounding region begins 8–10,000 years ago, after the end of the last glacial period. Paleo-Indians slowly advanced from Puget Sound into the interior mountain region as the glacial ice retreated. Archaeological evidence from other sites hundreds of miles away from the park indicate that Hozomeen chert, a type of rock well-suited to the fabrication of implements, was mined from near Hozomeen Mountain, just east of the park border, for the last 8,400 years. Tools such as microblades made from Hozomeen chert are part of the archaeological record throughout the Skagit River Valley, west of the park and in regions to the east. Prehistoric micro blades 9,600 years old have been discovered at Cascade Pass, a mountain pass that connects the western lowlands to the interior regions of the park and the Stehekin River Valley. The microblades are part of an archaeological assemblage that includes five distinct cultural periods, indicating that people were traveling into the mountains nearly 10,000 years ago. As well as the archaeological excavation at Cascade Pass, there are another 260 prehistoric sites that have been identified in the park.

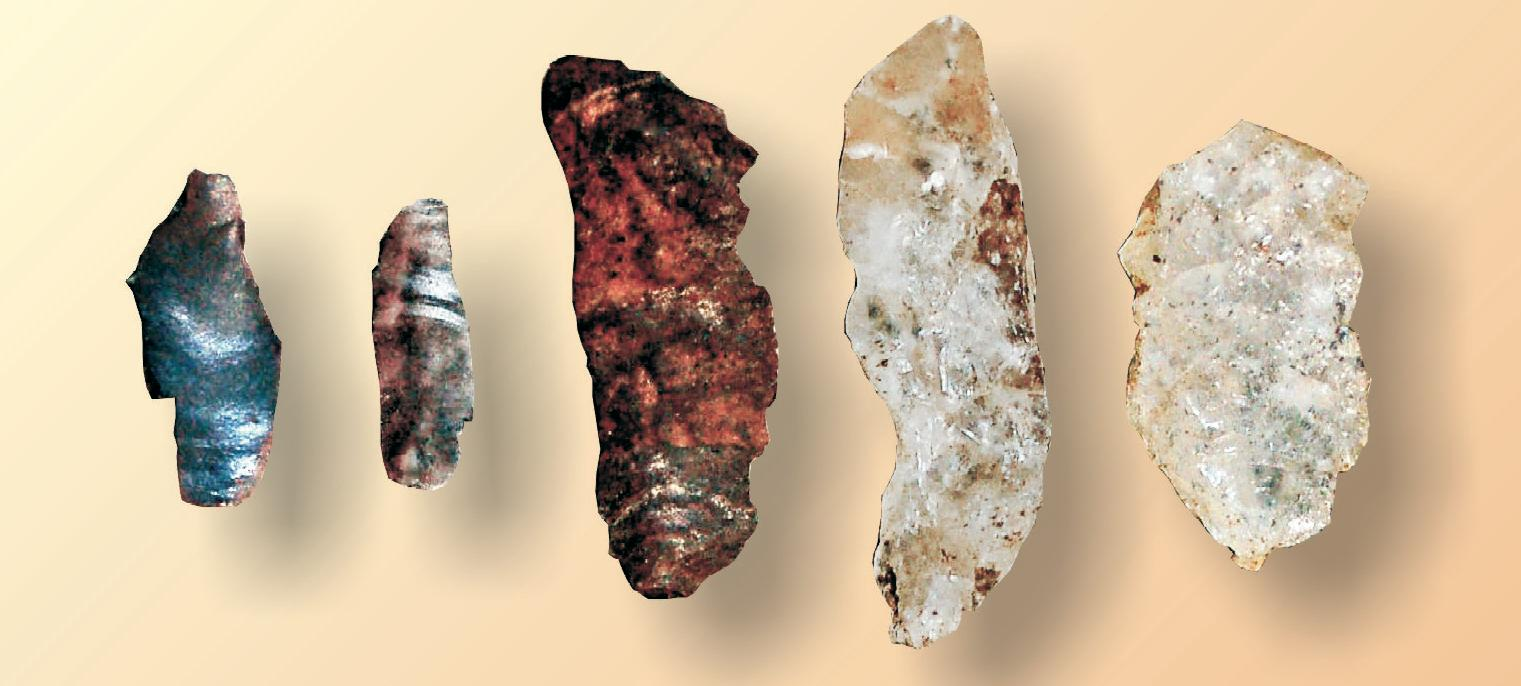
Microblades excavated from Cascades Pass; the two on the right were crafted from quartz.

When White explorers first entered the area in the late 18th century, an estimated thousand Skagits lived in what is now North Cascades National Park as well as the surrounding area. Residing mainly to the west of the park near Puget Sound, the Skagits lived in settlements, culling their needs from the waterways and traveling by canoe. Skagits formed a loose confederation of tribes that united if threatened by outside tribes such as the Haidas, who lived to the north. They erected large houses or lodges that could house multiple families, each with their own partitioned area and entrance. The lodges were 100 feet (30 m) in length and 20 to 40 ft (6.1 to 12.2 m) in width, and the roofs were shed-styles, with a single pitch; structures built by other Puget Sound tribes usually had gable roofs with more than one pitch. The Skagits were generally lowlanders, who only ventured into the North Cascades during the summer months, and structures in the mountains were more modest, consisting mostly of temporary buildings erected with poles and covered with branches. The Skagits erected totem poles and participated in potlatch ceremonies, similar to the Haidas, but with less complexity and extravagance. By 1910, only about 56 Skagits remained in the region, but their numbers have since rebounded to several hundred.

Inland and residing to the north and east of the Skagit tribe, the Nlaka'pamux (also known as the "Thompson Indians", named after explorer David Thompson), Chelan, Okanogan and Wenatchi (Wenatchee) tribes lived partly or year-round in the eastern sections of the North Cascades. The Skagits and Nlaka'pamux often had disputes, and raided one another's camps in search of slaves or to exact retribution. Like the coastal-based Skagits, inland tribes also constructed long lodges which were occupied by numerous families, though the style of construction was slightly different as the lodges did not have partitions separating one family from another, and were frame constructed and covered with reed mats rather than from cedar planking. One Wenatchee tribal lodge was described by Thompson as being 240 ft (73 m) long. Inland tribes were more likely to travel on foot or horseback than by canoe since the inland regions were less densely forested. Inland tribes also had less bountiful fisheries and greater weather extremes due to being further away from the moderating influence of the Pacific Ocean. Inland tribes rarely erected totem poles or participated in potlatch ceremonies. By the beginning of the 20th century, inland tribes, like their coastal neighbors, had experienced population decline from their first contact with White explorers a hundred years earlier, mostly due to smallpox and other diseases.

=== Anglo-European exploration ===
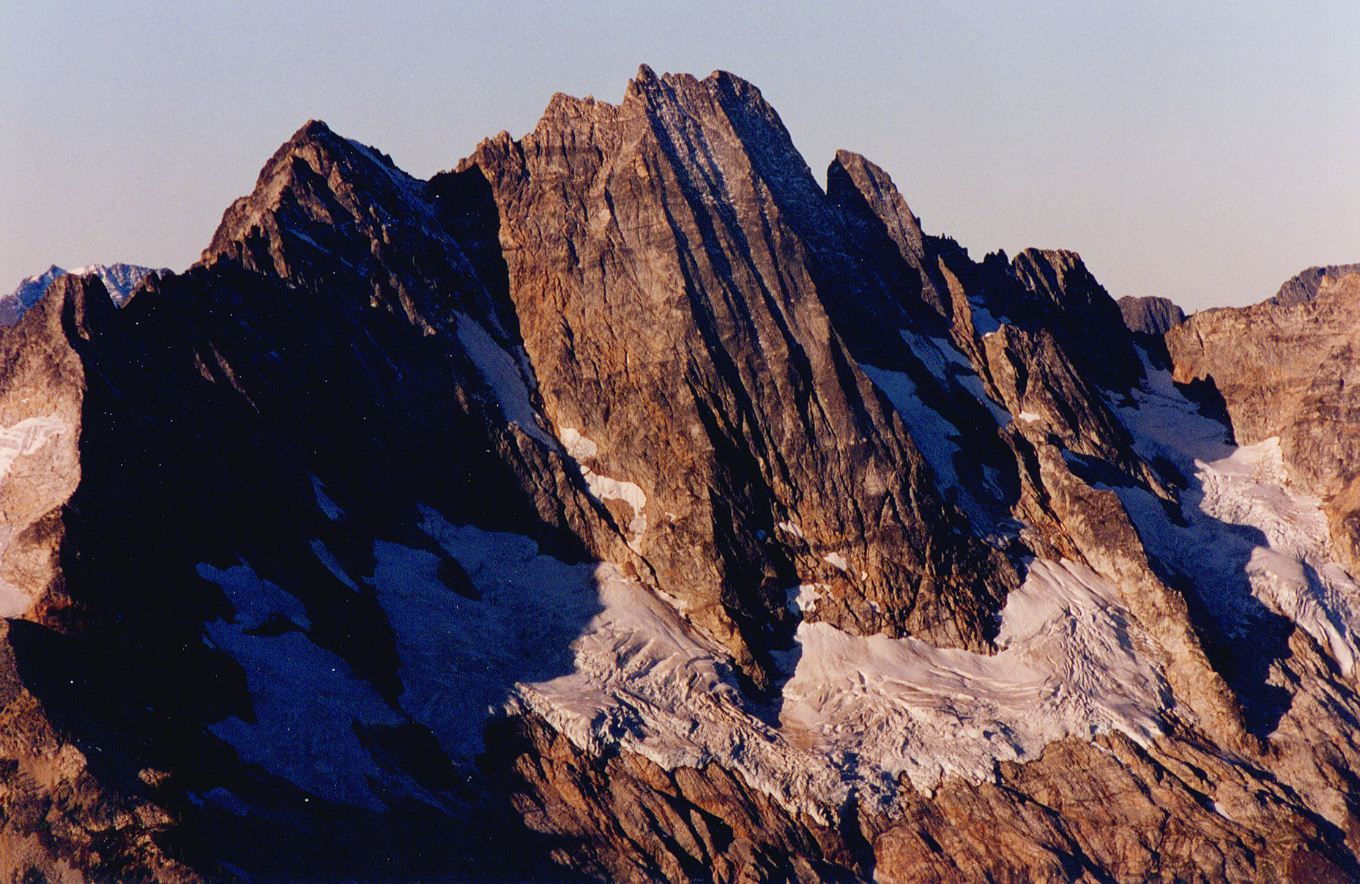
Goode Mountain is the tallest mountain in the park.

The first White explorer to enter the North Cascades was most likely a Scotsman named Alexander Ross, who was in the employ of the American-owned Pacific Fur Company. To the southeast of the modern park boundary, Ross and other members of the company constructed Fort Okanogan in 1811, as a base from which to operate during the early period of the Pacific Northwest fur trade. Fort Okanogan was the first American settlement in present-day Washington State, well north of the route followed by members of the Lewis and Clark Expedition of 1804–1806, and also north of Fort Vancouver, on the Columbia River. Fort Okanogan was later owned by the North West Company, and then the Hudson's Bay Company, both of which were British-owned.

Both Native American and White trappers conducted fur transactions at the trading post, which was staffed by representatives of the fur trading company. During one season, Ross traded 1,500 beaver pelts. In 1814, Ross became the first known White explorer to explore the valleys and high passes of the North Cascades, but he was less interested in exploration than discovering a route that would easily connect the fur trading posts of interior Washington with Puget Sound to the west. Ross was accompanied by three Indians, one of whom was a guide who led the party to a high pass in the North Cascades. Ross and the guide may have traveled as far west as the Skagit River, but failed to get to Puget Sound. Fur trading slowed considerably as demand for furs decreased in the 1840s, but a few residents continued to augment their income by trapping for furs in the area until 1968, when the park was established, rendering the activity illegal.

Aside from isolated trappers, the North Cascades saw no further explorations until the 1850s. In 1853, US Army Captain George B. McClellan led a party that explored the area for potential locations for the construction of a railroad through the region. McClellan determined the mountains were too numerous and precipitous, and that any railway would have to be constructed well to the south.

American and British disputes in the region centered on the fur trade, and the Treaty of 1818 allowed for joint administration of Oregon Country, as it was referred to in the United States – the British Empire referred to the region as the Columbia District. The treaty set the international border at the 49th parallel, but this was disputed west of the Rocky Mountains, since the rival fur trading outfits had their own ideas about where the border should be. The Oregon boundary dispute between Britain and the United States eventually led to the Oregon Treaty of 1846, and the 49th parallel forms both the current international border as well as the northern limit of the current park. During the late 1850s, members of the US North West Boundary Commission explored the border region, attempting to identify which mountains, rivers and lakes belonged to which country. One party of the commission was led by explorer Henry Custer, and they explored the northern district of the park, publishing their report in the 1860s. Custer's party crossed Whatcom Pass in 1858, and were the first Whites to see Challenger Glacier and Hozomeen Mountain. Impressed with the scenic grandeur of the region, Custer stated, "must be seen, it cannot be described".

In 1882, US Army Lieutenant Henry Hubbard Pierce led a government-sponsored exploration that traversed the western boundary of the southern section of the current park, in search of transportation routes and natural resources. As with the party led by McClellan in the 1850s, Pierce failed to find a suitable route for a railway, and only marginally suitable routes for roads. However, the expedition discovered gold in a quartz vein on the slopes of Eldorado Peak. Further expeditions by the military in 1883 and 1887 also determined that the mountains were virtually impenetrable. Explorers continued to seek out routes for wagon roads and railways and by the end of the 19th century, much of the park had been explored, but it was not until 1972 that the North Cascades Highway bisected the mountains.

=== Mining, logging and dam construction ===
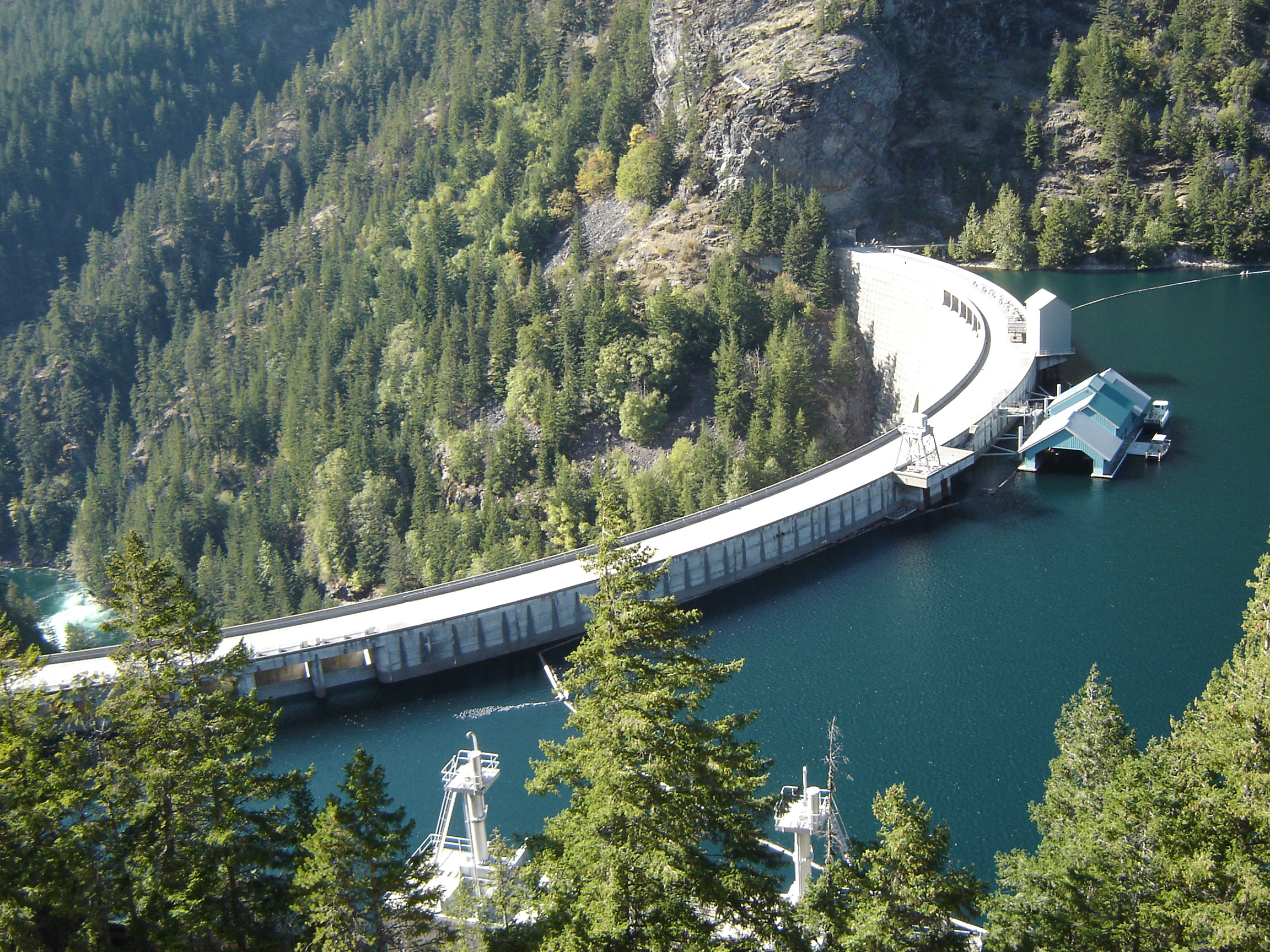
Ross Dam in the Ross Lake National Recreation Area

Mineral prospectors entered the North Cascades region, and by the 1850s were doing placer mining along the banks of the Skagit River in search of gold. In the 1870s, placer mining also commenced along Ruby Creek, and hundreds of miners came to the region even though it was difficult to access. Most mining activity along Ruby Creek had ended by the 1880s, but was soon replaced by hard rock mining for silver and other minerals. This second period of mining lasted from the 1890s to the 1940s, but was only marginally more lucrative. Miners were hampered by short working seasons, difficult terrain, low quantities of ore and a lack of financial investment. Miners built some of the first trails and roads into portions of the backcountry, some of which involved intricate engineering, including bridges over the numerous streams and dynamiting rock ledges above steep gorges during trail construction. One mining company built a series of flumes, the longest of which was over 3 miles (4.8 km), to transport lumber and to supply water for use in their hydraulic mining operation.

During the late 19th century and the first half of the 20th century, larger operations mined silver and lead in addition to gold, mostly with little or no profitability. The demand for metals was not constant, and so prices tended to fluctuate too greatly for mining to be viable. Once the region became a national park, some privately owned mining inholdings remained. One such inholding, the Thunder Creek mine, was still privately owned as of 1997.

Unlike in many other regions of the Pacific Northwest, logging had little impact on the future park. The ruggedness of the terrain and the existence of more economically viable timber resources that were closer to transportation routes largely dissuaded the timber industry from logging in the area. In 1897 the Washington Forest Reserve was set aside, preserving the forestland that would later become the park. By 1905, the management of the reserve was transferred from the Department of the Interior to the Department of Agriculture. The Forest Service was subsequently created to administer these forest reserves nationwide, which were redesignated as National Forests. Though the Department of Agriculture allowed commercial enterprises to log the forest with a permit, most of the timber taken from the region was used only locally for the construction of cabins and similar small-scale enterprises. Logging expanded when the Skagit River Hydroelectric Project was commenced by the public utility Seattle City Light in the 1920s. Almost 12,000 acres (4,900 ha) of timber would have been left underwater by the completion of the Ross Dam. A contract to extract the timber was awarded in 1945 and the project was completed in 1958. None of the dams or areas that were extensively logged are within the current boundaries of the national park, but they are in the adjoining Ross Lake National Recreation Area.

=== Establishing the National Park ===
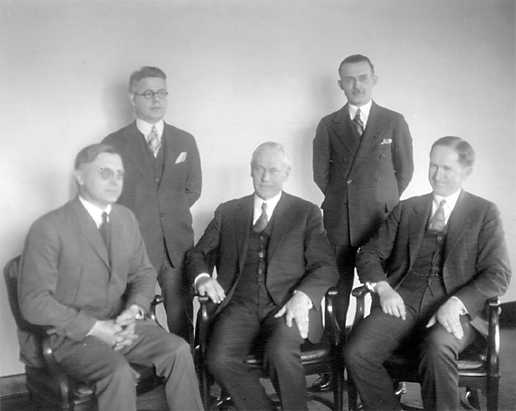
Stephen Mather (seated at center) was the first Director of the National Park Service, and is the namesake for the vast wilderness area that now encompasses almost all of the park.

The establishment of Yellowstone National Park in 1872, and Yosemite National Park in 1890, led preservationists to argue for similar protections for other areas. Even before the North Cascade region was designated as a Forest Reserve in 1897, activists argued the region should be afforded the greater protection accorded from a National Park designation. Washingtonians submitted a petition in 1892 to establish a national park to the north of Lake Chelan, as many who had visited the region believed it to have scenery "greater than Switzerland's". Further efforts took place in 1906, and again between 1916 and 1921, when artist Julian Itter and the Mazamas Alpine Club lobbied for a bill to designate "Mount Baker National Park". The proposals failed to gain approval from the US Congress and were shelved for decades.

Not all locals supported the idea of a national park, as they felt that such a designation would damage the economics of the region. The Forest Service was also not in favor of park designation, as they would have to relinquish control over the land to the Park Service, which was not uncommon, since many parks being established were originally managed by the Forest Service. In an effort to appease their detractors, the Forest Service designated Primitive Areas which would provide increased protection to some of the most pristine regions they managed.

By the mid-1930s, forester Bob Marshall argued that the region should be set aside as wilderness. Rival interests continued to argue over whether the lands should remain under the management of the Forest Service or the National Park Service, but by the 1960s the environmentalist argument advocating for a national park prevailed. President John F. Kennedy directed the Departments of Agriculture and the Interior to fund a joint study into a possible national park in the North Cascades region, which was completed in January 1966 and submitted to Congress. The size of the national park was subject to debate locally and in Congress, as well as its effect on the local logging industry. The North Cascades National Park Act designated the region as a national park on October 2, 1968, and the National Park Service commenced direct management on January 1, 1969. The North Cascades National Park Act also designated Ross Lake and Lake Chelan National Recreation Areas. Redwood National Park in California was also signed into existence on the same day as the North Cascades. By 1988, much of Bob Marshall's original plan to set aside the future park as wilderness was achieved when almost all of North Cascades National Park was designated as the Stephen Mather Wilderness.

== Park management ==
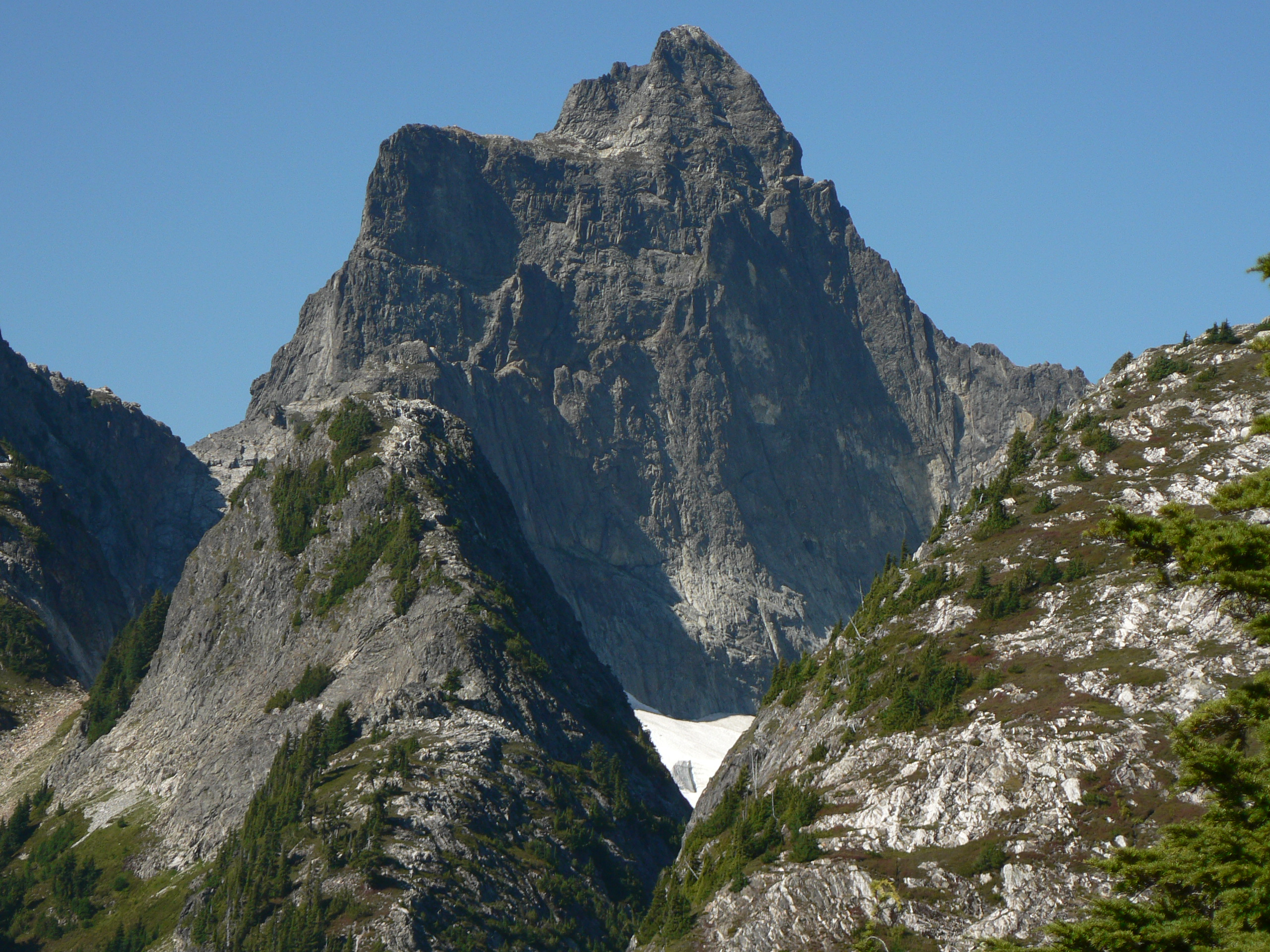
Mount Triumph

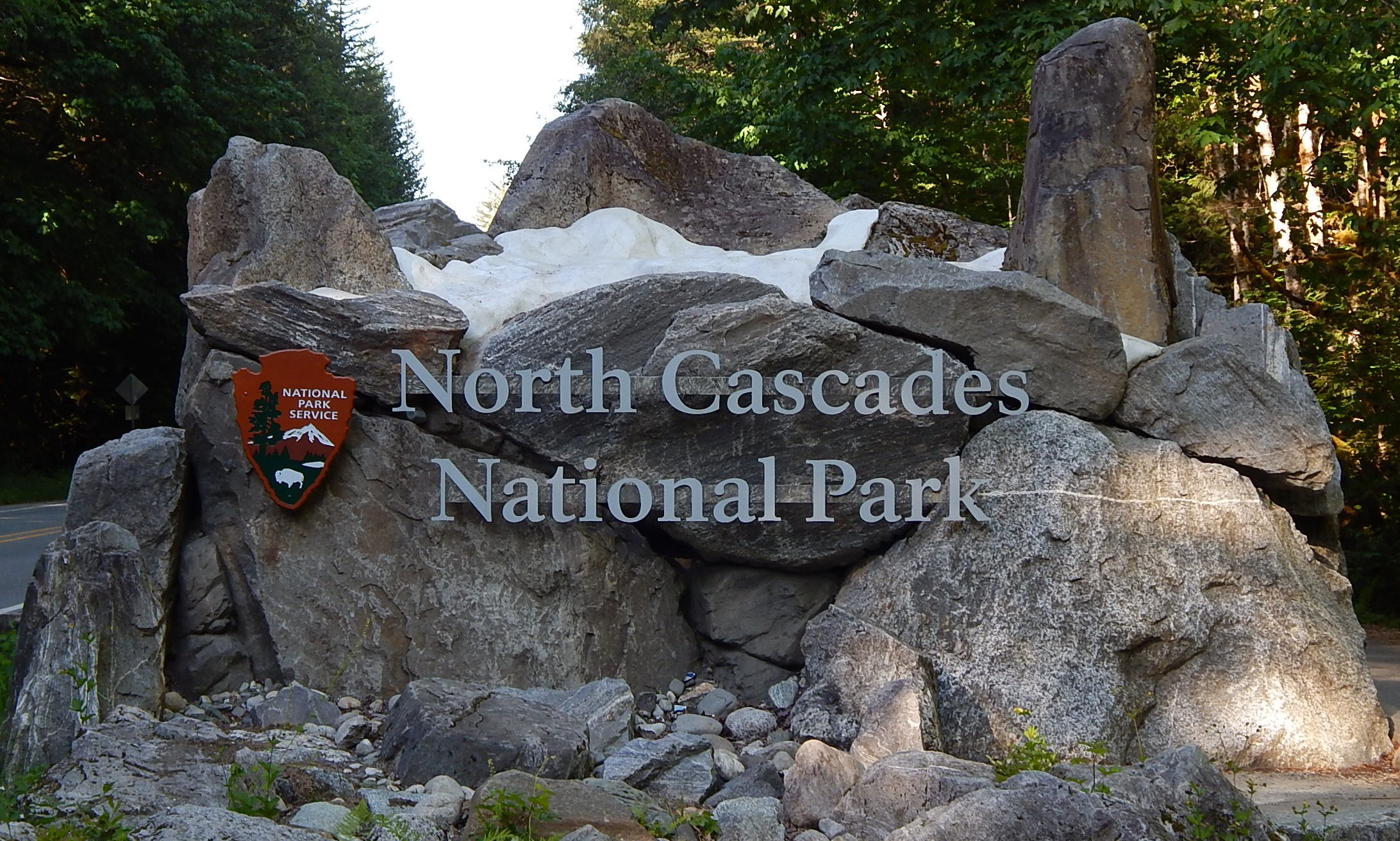
West entrance sign on SR 20

North Cascades National Park is managed by the National Park Service, and the park headquarters is in Sedro-Woolley, Washington. The park consists of a northern and a southern district or unit. These are separated by Ross Lake National Recreation Area. The southeast boundary of the southern district abuts Lake Chelan National Recreation Area; the park and two recreation areas are managed as the North Cascades National Park Complex. Most of the park complex was designated as the Stephen Mather Wilderness, preventing further human-induced alterations to 93 percent of the park. The mandate of the National Park Service is to "preserve and protect natural and cultural resources". In keeping with this mandate, hunting is illegal in the park, as is mining, logging, oil and gas extraction, and removal of natural or cultural resources.

In 2024, North Cascades National Park recorded 16,485 visitors, while adjoining Ross Lake National Recreation Area reported 971,173 visitors and Lake Chelan National Recreation Area had 30,815 visitors. Peak visitation is between June and September. Ross Lake NRA is easily accessible on State Route 20 (also called the North Cascades Highway), the only road which traverses the park complex; the highway lies entirely within the Ross Lake NRA. Only two primitive roadways enter the actual national park. The North Cascades National Park Complex had an operating base budget of $7,700,000 for fiscal year 2010, augmented by another $3,700,000 of non-base funding (which can fluctuate significantly on an annual basis), and additional funding from revenue generated from concessionaire contracts and user fees. Much of the budget is for staffing, with 83 percent covering the cost of 81 permanent employees, not all of whom are employed year-round, and the nearly 250 seasonal and term employees who work primarily in the summer months. In 2017, the fiscal year budget was approximately 7.5 million dollars, and budgets have been stagnant overall for all National Park Service sites for many years.

=== Access ===
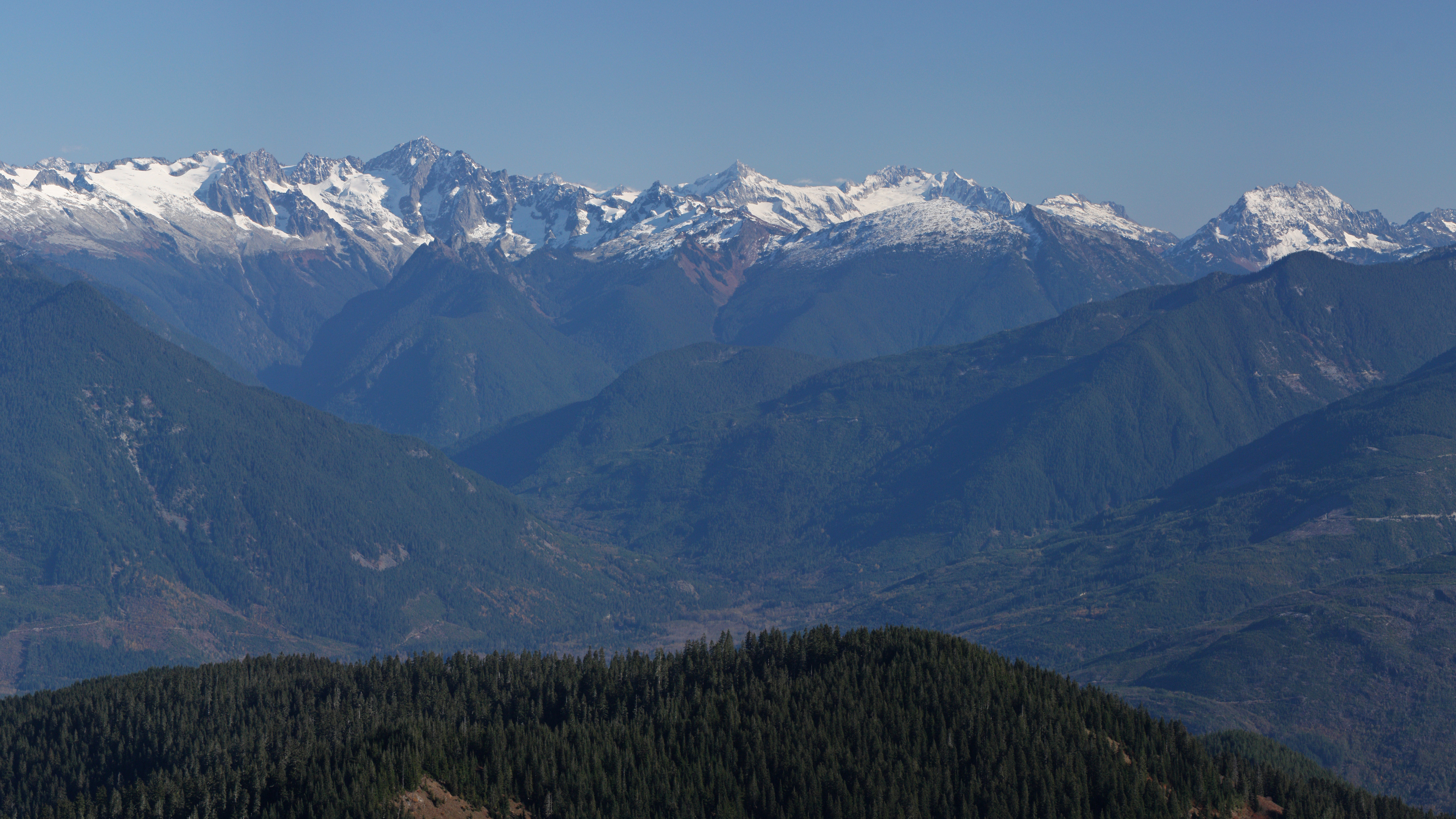
The south unit of the park is dominated by Eldorado Peak (left center skyline). Cascade Pass, one of the most popular hiking destinations in the park, is the lowest point on the skyline between Boston Peak (just right of center, with large glacier) and broad Johannesburg Mountain (right). Hidden Lake Peaks, another popular hike, are in the middle distance below and right of Boston Peak.

Although there are some gravel roads open to the public that enter the park, such as the Cascade River Road beginning at Marblemount, and the Thornton Lakes Road near Newhalem, most automobile traffic travels on State Route 20, which passes through the Ross Lake National Recreation Area. The visitor center at Newhalem on the North Cascades Highway is open in the summer. Some of the best views of Mount Shuksan are from the Heather Meadows Visitor Center in Mount Baker-Snoqualmie National Forest well outside of the park. All backcountry access requires a permit, and most are obtained at the Wilderness Information Center near Marblemount. Full accessibility for all is not available in the park, but the adjacent National Recreation Areas have a few trails, and all visitor centers, campgrounds and restrooms are fully accessible.

The nearest large town on the west side of the park is Sedro-Woolley, and Winthrop lies to the east. Chelan is located at the southeastern end of Lake Chelan where access to the park from Stehekin serves eastern Washington communities. The closest international airport is Seattle-Tacoma International Airport (Sea-Tac), which is 120 mi (190 km) from North Cascades Visitor Center and 190 mi (310 km) from Chelan. In Chelan, the Lady of the Lake is a passenger-only ferry that transports visitors to Stehekin, and the trailheads hikers can use to access the southern end of the park.

== Geography ==
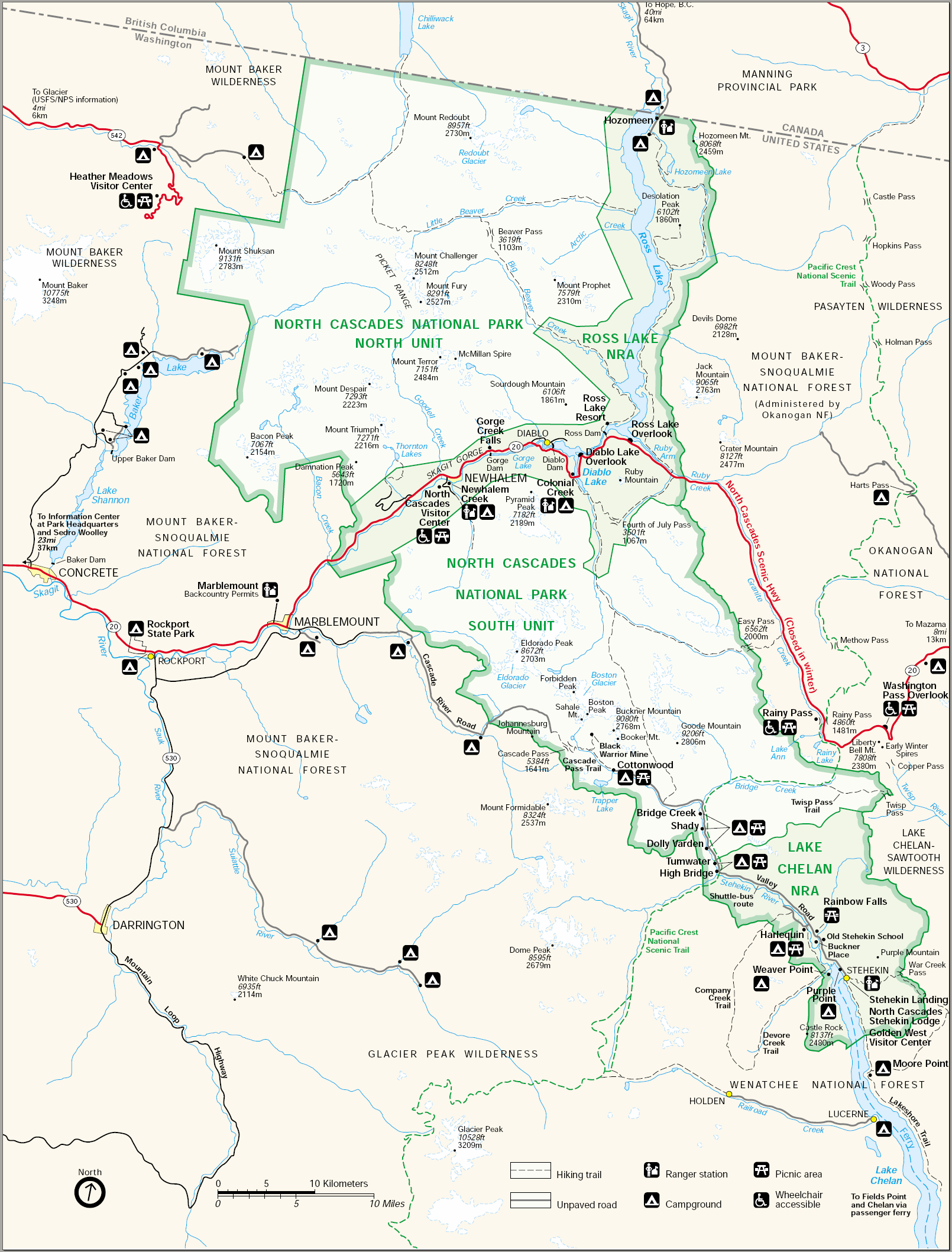
Map of the North Cascades National Park Complex

North Cascades National Park is located in portions of Whatcom, Skagit, and Chelan counties in the U.S. state of Washington. Bisected by Ross Lake National Recreation Area (NRA), the park consists of two districts; the northern and southern. The northern boundary of the north district is also the international border between the United States and Canada; the latter manages adjoining Chilliwack Lake and Skagit Valley Provincial Park. The entire eastern and southern boundary of the north district is bordered by Ross Lake NRA. The western side of the north district is bordered by Mount Baker-Snoqualmie National Forest, within which lies the Mount Baker and Noisy-Diobsud Wildernesses, both of which border the park. Mount Baker-Snoqualmie National Forest also borders a portion of the southern district of the park, to the southwest. Along the southwest border is Wenatchee National Forest, within which lies the Glacier Peak Wilderness. The southern boundary of the park is shared with Lake Chelan NRA, and a small section of the eastern boundary is shared with the Okanogan–Wenatchee National Forest. The Lake Chelan-Sawtooth Wilderness lies in the Okanogan–Wenatchee National Forest along the southeastern park boundary.

North Cascades National Park has nearly 9,000 feet (2,700 m) of vertical relief, with the park's highest point atop Goode Mountain, and the western valleys situated at only around 400 ft (120 m) above mean sea level, the park has a highly varied ecosystem, including eight life zones. Erosion from water and glacial ice have created some of the steepest mountain ranges in the contiguous US, rising between 4,000 and 6,000 ft (1,200 and 1,800 m) above their bases. The park is home to over 300 glaciers as well as 300 lakes, and contains the headwaters for some streams that flow into the Skagit River, as well as the Stehekin and Nooksack Rivers. The ruggedness of the terrain was an obstacle to human encroachment and consequently, the park is almost entirely wilderness.

=== Geology ===
North Cascades National Park was named after the North Cascades mountains, which are a subsection of the Cascade Range that extends from northern California into British Columbia. The North Cascades are the northernmost section of the range and unlike their southern counterparts that consist of Tertiary to Holocene volcanic rocks, the North Cascades are composed primarily of Mesozoic crystalline and metamorphic rocks. Though most rocks in the park are from the more recent Mesozoic, the oldest rocks are 400 million years old, dating from the Devonian. A complex assemblage of various rock formations have repeatedly been eroded, reburied, subjected to fracturing and heat, creating a geological puzzle that is one of the most complicated and least understood geological records in North America. These forces are ongoing and the region continues to see uplift and faulting.

Evidence from the fossils and magnetism found in the rocks indicates that the terranes composing the North Cascades drifted thousands of miles north until they impacted the North American Plate 90 million years ago. The collision between the rocks caused fracturing and folding as well as uplift and the terranes were further fractured into north or south trending faults. The uplifted rocks mostly eroded away; 40 million years ago the heavier basaltic rocks of the ocean floor started to push the lighter granitic rocks that are the core of the mountains upward, a process that continues. Subjected to intense heat, rocks deep underground near the collision zone became recrystallized into granitic rocks, which comprise the backbone of the highest peaks. Continued uplift and erosion and finally the action of glacial ice on the landscape during the Holocene exposed the rocks visible today.

Much harder and more durable than the younger volcanic rocks of the southern Cascades, the North Cascades are consequently more rugged, with steep terrain being the norm due to heavy erosion from water and ice. Continued rising in conjunction with erosion from water and ice has created deep valleys and significant vertical relief that is comparable to much taller mountain ranges.

=== Mountains ===
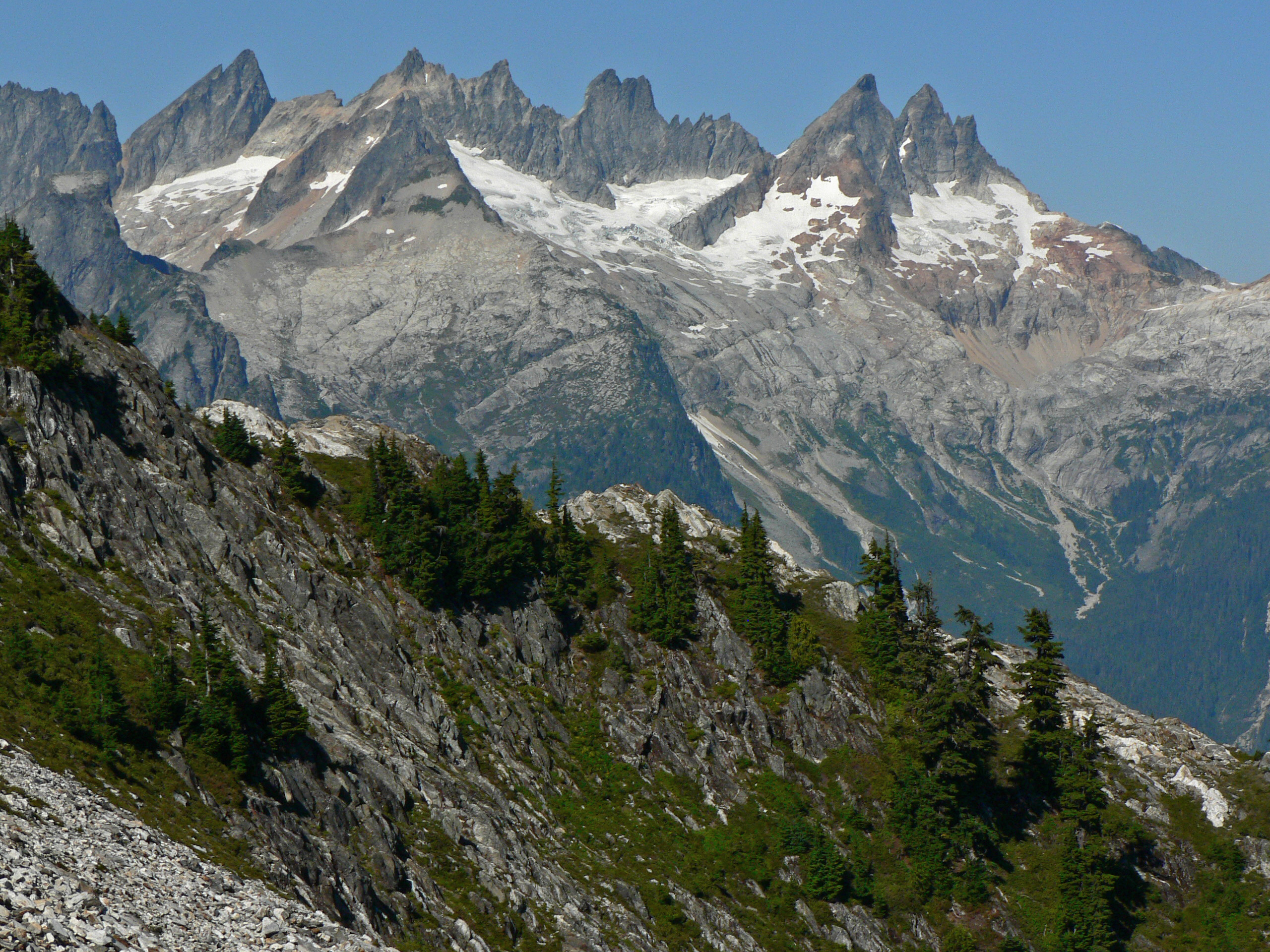
View from the south of Mount Terror (left skyline), Inspiration Peak (center) and McMillan Spires (right center), major summits in the southern portion of the Picket Range

The tallest mountain in North Cascades National Park is Goode Mountain at 9,220 ft (2,810 m). It lies in a remote backcountry region of the southern section of the park. Nearby are several other peaks that exceed 9,000 ft (2,700 m), including Buckner Mountain (9,114 ft (2,778 m)) and Mount Logan (9,087 ft (2,770 m)). At about 9,000 ft (2,700 m), about 5 miles (8.0 km) northeast of Goode Mountain, is Black Peak (8,970 ft (2,730 m)). Other prominent peaks in the southern section of the park include Boston Peak (8,894 ft (2,711 m)), Eldorado Peak (8,868 ft (2,703 m)) and Forbidden Peak (8,815 ft (2,687 m)).

The northern region of the park contains the Picket Range, a subrange of the Skagit Range, which is in turn a subrange of the North Cascades. The Picket Range has numerous spires with ominous names such as Mount Fury, Mount Challenger, Poltergeist Pinnacle, Mount Terror, Ghost Peak and Phantom Peak, all of which exceed 8,000 ft (2,400 m). The Picket Range is only 6 mi (9.7 km) long yet contains 21 peaks over 7,500 ft (2,300 m). North of the Picket Range and near the border with Canada lie Mount Redoubt (8,969 ft (2,734 m)), Mount Spickard (8,979 ft (2,737 m)) and the spires of the Mox Peaks (8,630 ft (2,630 m)). Isolated and dominating the northwestern reaches of the park lies the oft photographed Mount Shuksan (9,131 ft (2,783 m)), which towers more than 8,400 ft (2,600 m) above Baker Lake only 6 mi (9.7 km) to the south.

=== Water features ===
More than 500 lakes and ponds are located within North Cascades National Park. Many of these are devoid of fish, not uncommon in steep terrain where fish may not be able to access high altitude waterways. Around 240 of these lakes exist in the higher elevations and stocking of some of these lakes with fish has been ongoing since the late 19th century. Fishing in these lakes, which, without fish stocking, do not have native fish, is part of the area's economy and tourism. In 2008 an Environmental Impact Statement was produced that examined whether these lakes should continue to be stocked, and if so, what the impact would be on native species such as salamanders and other aquatic life. The North Cascades National Park Service Complex Fish Stocking Act, signed in 2014, directs the NPS to allow stocking of non-reproducing fish in no more than 42 lakes, making it the only national park to continue to stock non-native fish in park lakes. The prior decision not to continue to stock the lakes with fish was part of a larger debate about what "natural" means in reference to national parks.

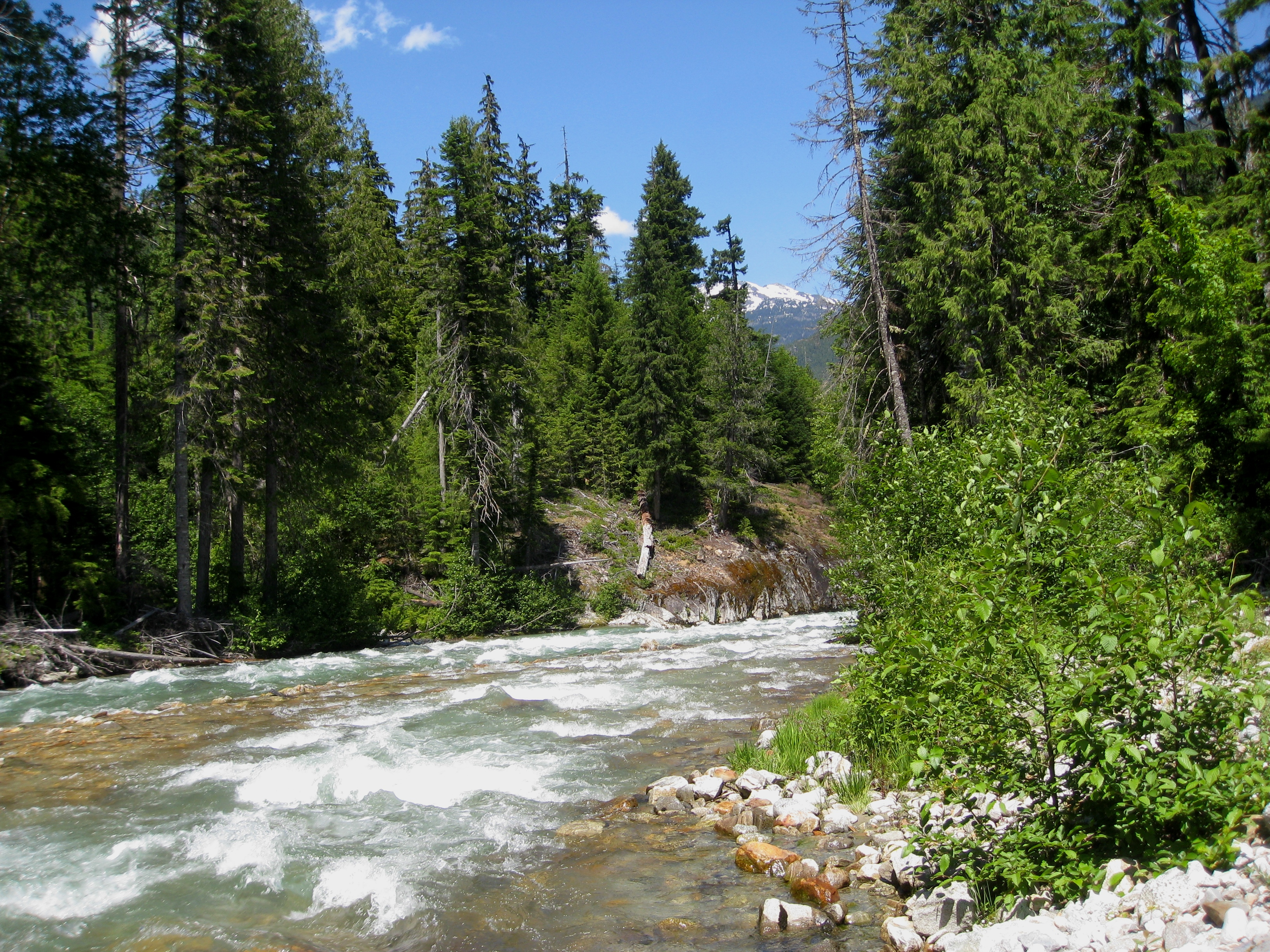
Thunder Creek is known for its milky appearance from suspended rock particles called glacial flour.

Hundreds of creeks and streams and several rivers originate within the park. The streams at higher elevation are often directly supplied by meltwater from glaciers, and they carry finely ground rock particles commonly referred to as glacial flour. Turning the water a turquoise hue at times, this finely ground powder remains suspended in lakes the creeks flow into, also causing some of them to appear turquoise. Thunder Creek is particularly well known for this attribute, as it is supplied melt water from dozens of glaciers and transports the suspended particles into Diablo Lake.

The Skagit River divides the park into the north and south districts; it lies within the Ross Lake NRA and outside of the national park boundaries, but some of the creeks and streams that supply it originate within the national park; the Baker River is the largest of these tributaries. The Skagit River is the largest river that flows into Puget Sound to the west, and the dams located in Ross Lake National Recreation Area and impounding other lakes adjacent to the park supply nearly 90 percent of the electricity used in Seattle. Other important rivers that originate in the park include the Chilliwack, Nooksack and the Stehekin rivers.

=== Glaciers ===
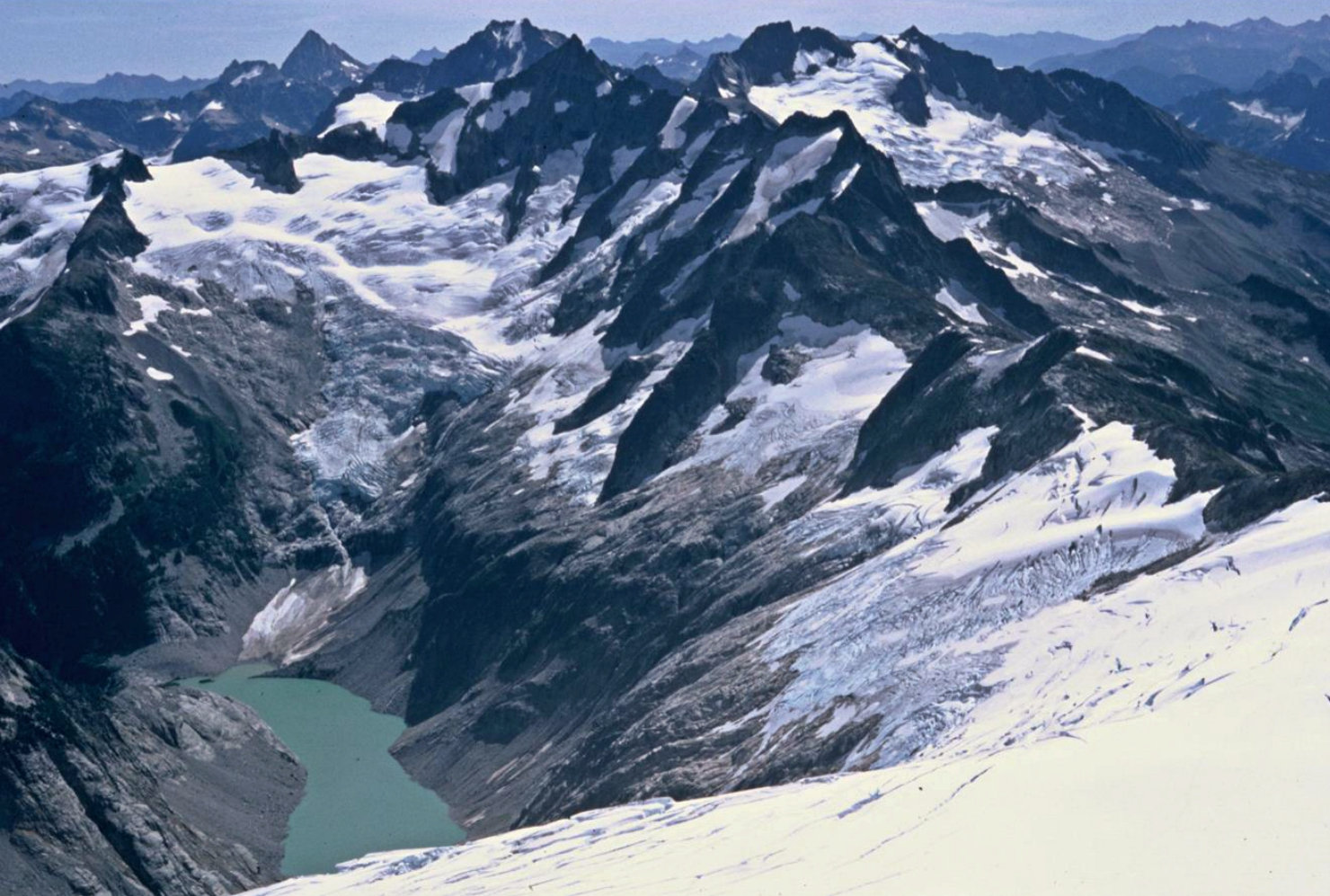
View of three glaciers from Eldorado Peak: Inspiration, Forbidden, and Quien Sabe

With approximately 312 glaciers, North Cascades National Park has the most glaciers of any US park outside Alaska, and a third of all the glaciers in the lower 48 states. Counting a few glaciers in the adjoining National Recreation Areas, the North Cascades National Park Complex glaciers covered an expanse totaling 27,000 acres (110 km^{2}) as of 2009. Boston Glacier, on the north slope of Boston Peak, is the largest glacier in the park, measured in 1971 to have an area of 1,730 acres (7.0 km^{2}). Other glaciers that were measured in 1971 to be larger than 2 square kilometres (0.77 sq mi) include East Nooksack and Sulphide Glaciers on Mount Shuksan, McAllister and Inspiration Glaciers on Eldorado Peak, Redoubt Glacier on Mount Redoubt, Neve Glacier on Snowfield Peak, and Challenger Glacier on Mount Challenger.

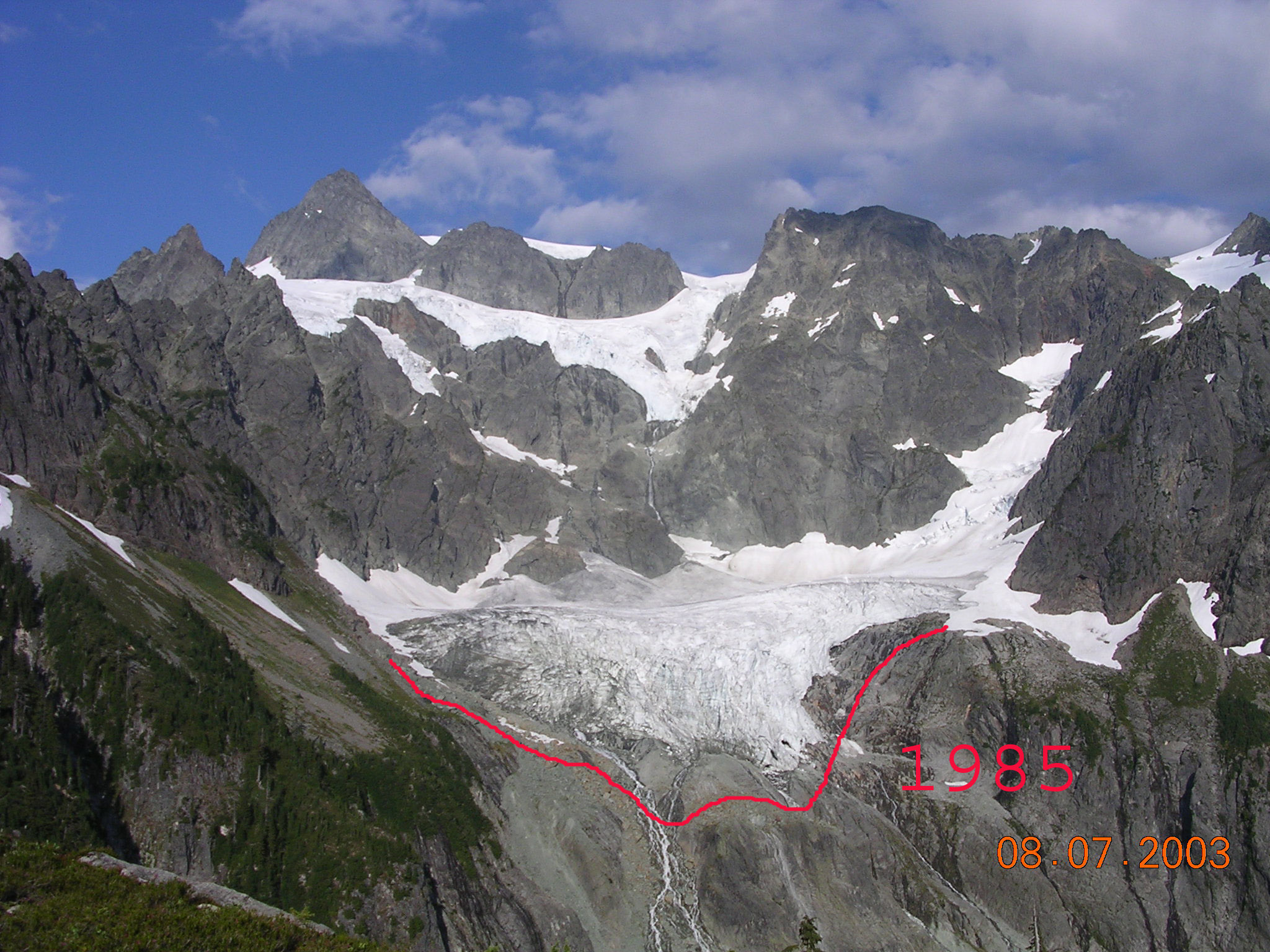
Lower Curtis Glacier in 2003 compared to 1985 extent demarcated by red line demonstrates the retreat of this glacier.

The dense concentration and relative ease of access to the North Cascade glaciers brought about some of the earliest series of scientific studies regarding glaciology in the United States. Beginning in 1955, the University of Washington sponsored Richard C. Hubley to undertake annual aerial photography expeditions designed to capture images of the glaciers and to show any alterations that might be occurring. In 1960, Austin Post expanded the aerial coverage to include other regions and he also used ground-based imagery to augment the research. In 1971, based on the photographs and other data collected since 1955, Post and others wrote a report that documented the number and scale of glaciers in the North Cascades. At the time of Austin Post's inventory, their study concluded that some North Cascades glaciers had experienced a period of minor growth or equilibrium in the mid-20th century, after undergoing decades of retreat. The study concluded that annual glacial melt due to seasonal variations has a significant influence on river levels, accounting for about 30 percent of the late summer water flow, which directly impacted the supported ecosystems such as salmon fisheries.

The National Park Service, United States Geological Survey (USGS) and glaciologists such as Mauri S. Pelto, who has led the North Cascades Glacier Climate Project since 1984, have continued research on North Cascade glaciers. Since 1993, the National Park Service has conducted rigorous studies on four park glaciers: Noisy Creek, Silver, North Klawatti and Sandalee Glaciers. The National Park Service research indicated that these four glaciers experienced rapid decrease in volumes between 1993 and 2011. In 1998, a National Park Service and Portland State University aerial photographic inventory showed a 13 percent loss in park-wide glacial volume since Austin Post's inventory in 1971. The NPS stated that in the last 150 years since the end of the Little Ice Age, a period of several centuries in which the earth experienced a cooling phase, glacial ice volumes in the North Cascades have been reduced by 40 percent. This loss of glacial ice has contributed to decreased melt in the summer. In a paper published in 2016, it was reported that since 1959 the Skagit River watershed has seen a 25 percent reduction in the summertime streamflow.

=== Map ===
Geographical features in the area can be found in this clickable map:

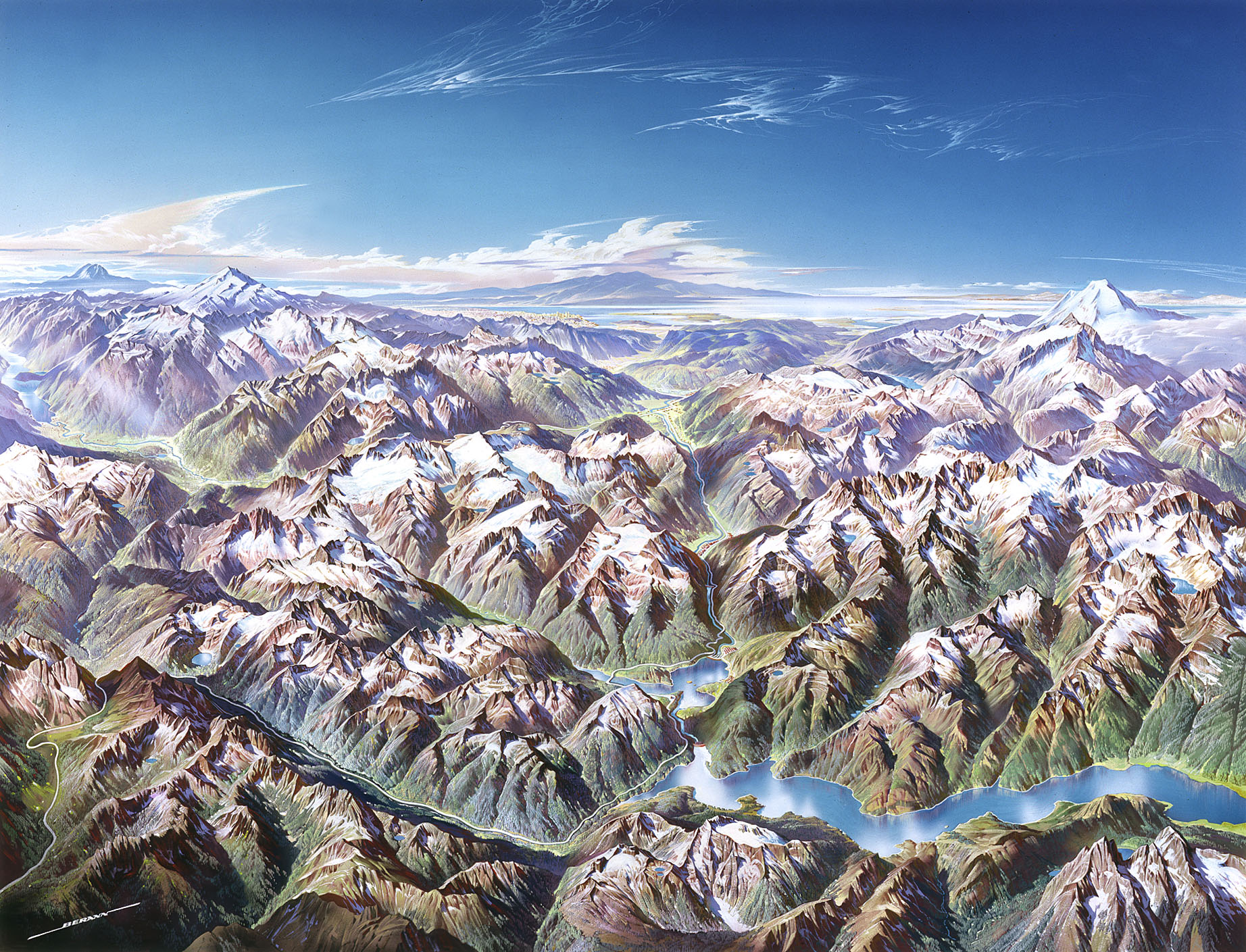
Painting of North Cascades Nat'l Park by Heinrich C. Berann. Aerial view of the entire park from the east, looking west. Ross Lake is in the foreground, drained by the Skagit River flowing toward Puget Sound and the Strait of Juan de Fuca in the background. Mount Baker is prominently visible on the upper right with Glacier Peak and Mount Rainier the prominent peaks in the upper left background and the Olympic Mountains the dark massif in the background of the upper centre. Mouse over the picture and click on an area of interest.

== Ecology ==
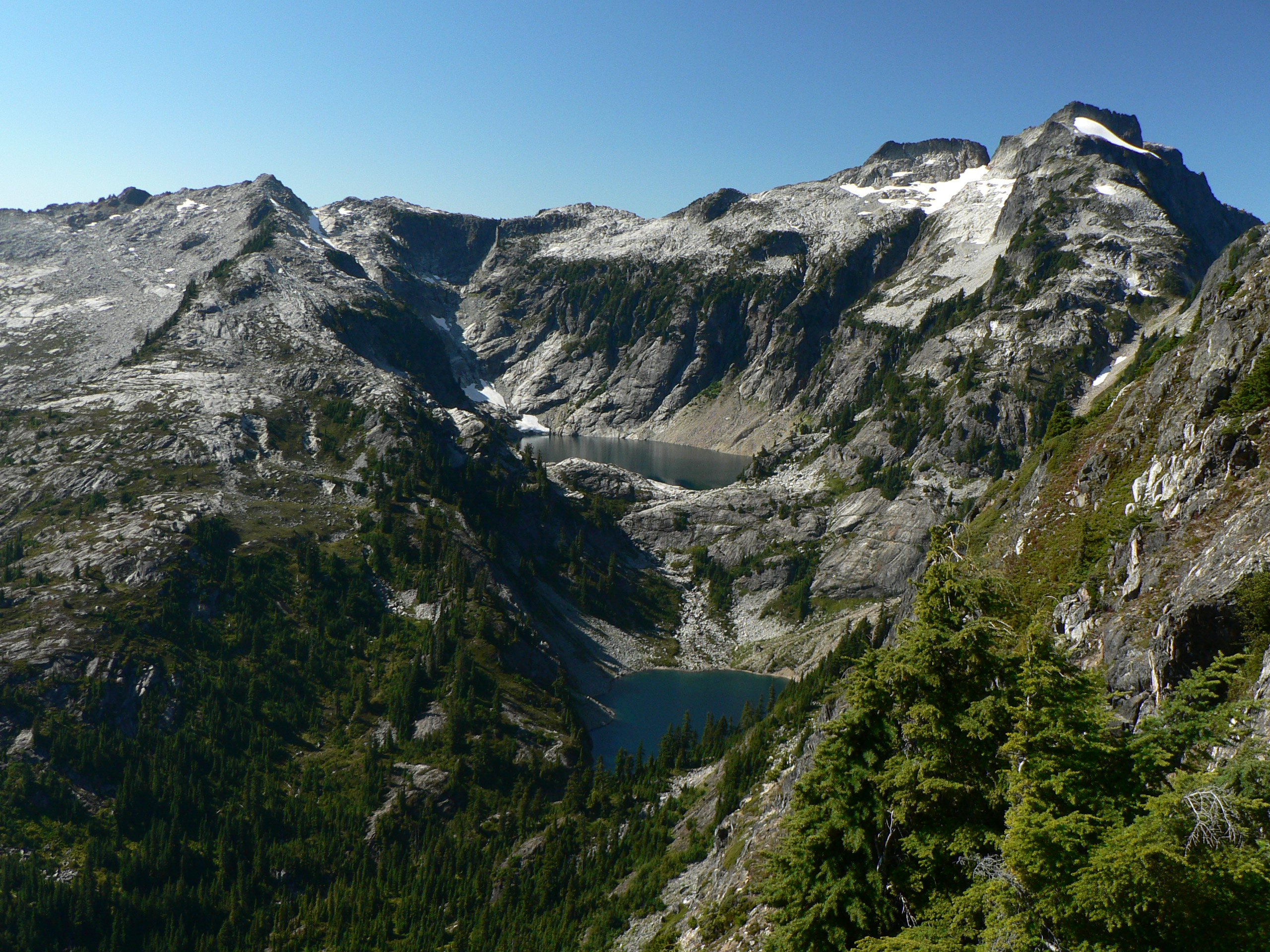
The Thornton Lakes fill glacier-carved basins near Mount Triumph

Eight distinctive life zones support thousands of different plant and animal species in the North Cascades National Park ecosystem. With an elevation gain of nearly 9,000 ft (2,700 m), the park has one of the largest ranges of biodiversity found in any US national park.

=== Flora ===
The flora in North Cascades National Park is influenced by the great vertical relief, the amount of moisture an area receives, the slope and soil types as well as the fire ecology. This wide array of ecological niches has allowed a great biodiversity to evolve. Few other North American national parks have recorded as many vascular plant species as have been documented in North Cascades National Park. With 1,630 species documented, experts estimate adding non-vascular plants and fungi could more than double the number of known plant species.

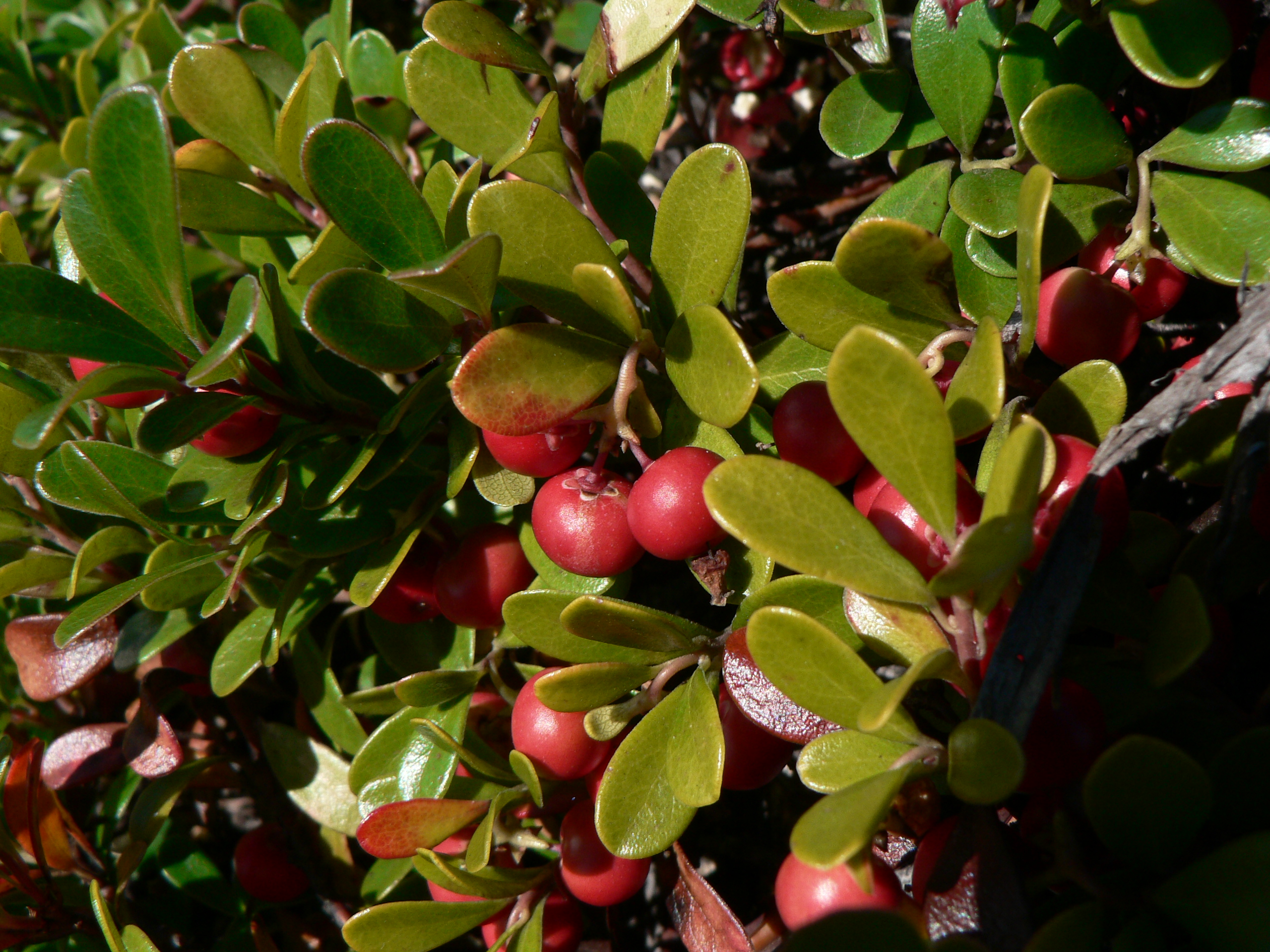
Common bearberry (Arctostaphylos uva-ursi) is a plant species normally found much further north but is found at higher elevations in the park.

The park contains an estimated 236,000 acres (960 km^{2}) of old-growth forests. As little of the park was previously logged, significant stands of old growth forest can be found in the valleys and lower slopes up to the timberline at 7,000 ft (2,100 m). From the lowest valley floors to about 2,000 ft (610 m), virgin stands of western hemlock, red cedar and Douglas fir are common. These species are heavily dependent on deep soils, and red cedars 1,000 years old and over 200 ft (61 m) tall can be found on Big Beaver Creek. These lowest elevation forests can be accessed by trails, such as the Happy Creek Forest Walk off State Route 20, the Shadows of the Sentinels at Baker Lake, Thunder Creek Trail at Diablo Lake and the Horseshoe Bend Trail from State Route 542. In openings in the forest canopy, red alder and bigleaf maple can be found but throughout this dense forest, ferns, shrubs and mosses abound.

Between 2,000 and 5,500 ft (610 and 1,680 m) the forest is dominated by the pacific silver fir tree near State Route 20 at Rainy Pass. Also at this elevation, the western hemlock is replaced by the mountain hemlock as a dominant species. At elevations between 4,000 and 7,000 ft (1,200 and 2,100 m) in the subalpine zone, the forest gives way to meadows dominated by grasses and flowering plants and shrubs. Above 7,000 ft (2,100 m) lies the alpine zone where few plant species survive aside from some sparse grasses, the occasional shrub and lichens. A warming climate has led to an altitude adjustment for many flora species, with the timberline reaching 415 ft (126 m) further up the mountain slopes since the 1960s.

The biodiversity of the area is threatened by climate change and invasive exotic plant species. These plants have spread across the park through the inadvertent redistribution from human activities, attaching themselves to cars and hikers. Invasive plants include the diffuse knapweed and reed canary grass. True grass species number nearly 150 in the park; half of those are considered exotic and nonnative to the ecosystem.

Whitebark pine is native to the park and grows at elevations over 5,000 ft (1,500 m) in the drier eastern region of the park. Whitebark pine is a stabilizing species for other species of high altitude flora and provides a food source for birds such as the Clark's nutcracker and mammals including red and Douglas squirrels. Scientists believe that increasing temperatures will have a negative impact on the habitat necessary to support whitebark pine, and therefore impact a wide array of other species. White pine blister rust and mountain pine beetles have devastated whitebark pine populations in many regions; as of 2018, "28 percent of whitebark pine trees are dead, 30 percent are infected with blister rust, and 1 percent have died from mountain pine beetles."

=== Fauna ===
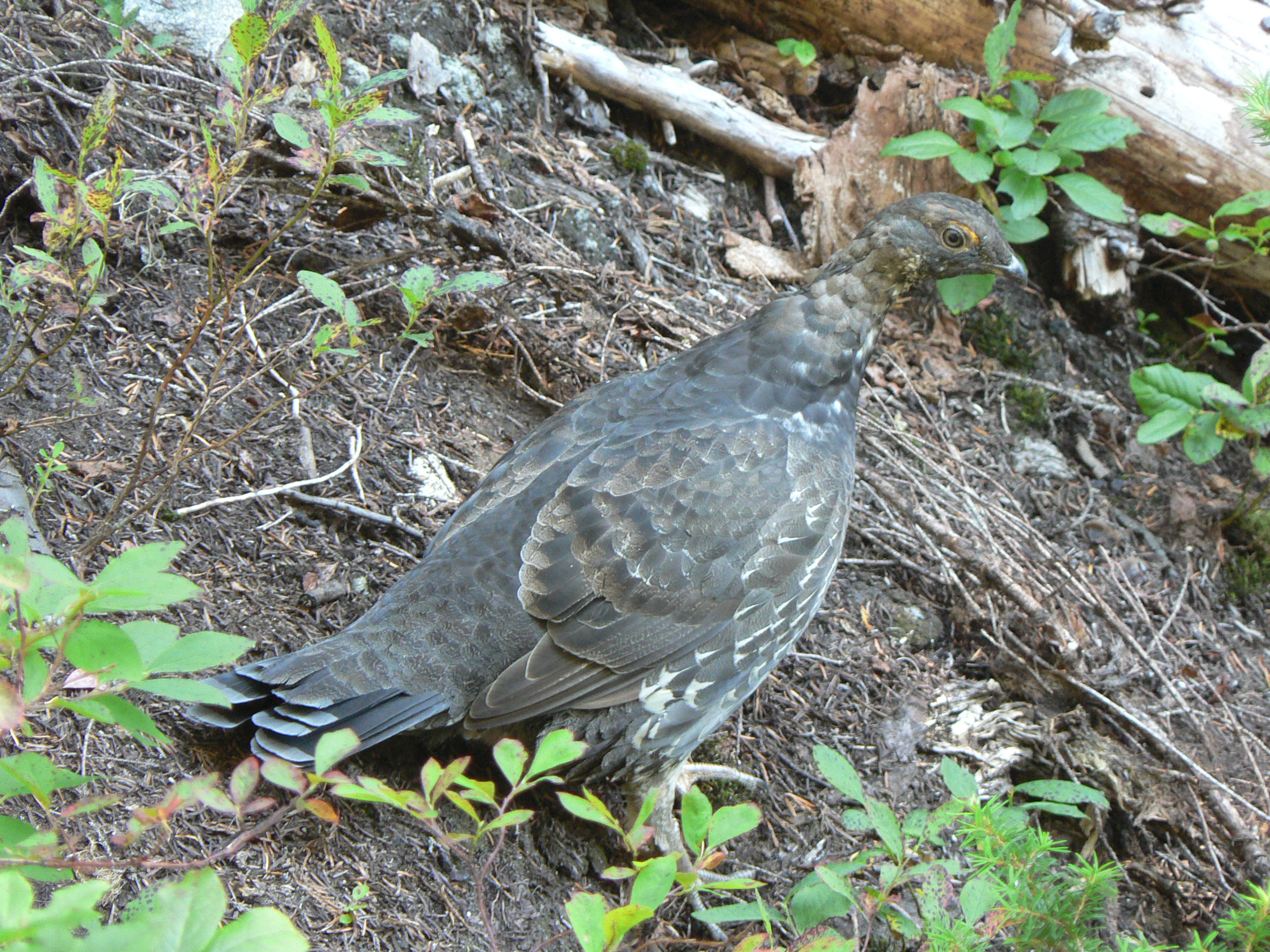
Sooty grouse seen on the Thornton Lakes trail

This park has a diversity of animal species including 75 mammal species. A total of 18 species of carnivores including coyote, bobcat, lynx, cougar, mink, river otter and black bear have been reported within this park. Several species of deer such as the elk and moose, several more species of bovids including the mountain goat and bighorn sheep, and more than two dozen species of rodents like the beaver, hoary marmot and pika are also present. Ten species of bats have been documented. The grey wolf is listed as an endangered species, while the grizzly bear is listed as threatened. North Cascade National Park has management plans in place to return grizzly bears to the park but not wolves, as the latter is seen as likely to reestablish themselves naturally over time.

The park is a prime habitat for grizzly bear, but the species was extirpated from the region by 1860. Only two grizzly bear sightings occurred in the decade before 2015, and these were outside the park boundary in Canada. In 1991, a decision was reached by the Interagency Grizzly Bear Committee, a US Government land management agency committee, to make efforts to restore self-sustaining populations of grizzlies in the North Cascades region, which included the national park and surrounding national forests. In 1997, the North Cascades region was added to the National Grizzly Bear Recovery Plan; by 2017, the environmental impact statement for grizzly bear restoration was still in the public comment stage. Various action plans had been proposed to reestablish a self-sustaining population of 200 grizzlies in the region.

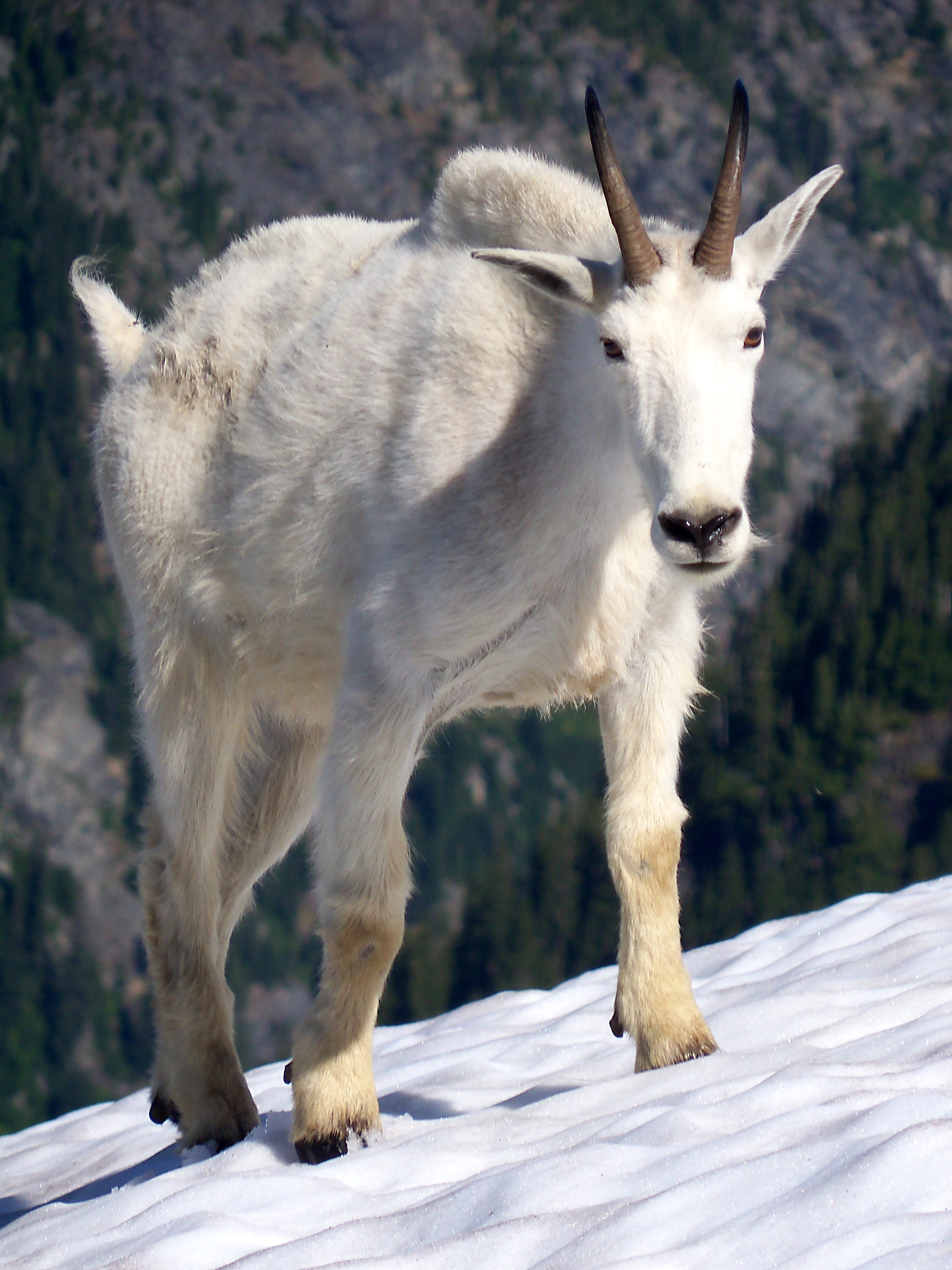
Mountain goats have hooves that are well adapted to steep snow-covered slopes and cliffs

Wolverines are one of the rarest and most elusive mammals in North America. They are seldom sighted in the park, both due to the limited numbers of the species and the habitats they prefer, which are snowy high-altitude regions far removed from human encroachment. Approximately nine wolverines were captured in the national forest east of the park and fitted with transmitters that were tracked by Argos satellite telemetry. Four of the wolverines frequented the southern sections of North Cascades National Park, and of those, two spent the majority of their time there; researchers were unable to determine if these study animals had reproduced in the park. A warming climate may impact any wolverine recovery efforts implemented due to the loss of snow cover this species needs to reproduce. Research indicates that wolverines den in deep snow at least 5 ft (1.5 m) deep that lasts well into May, and as climate warms, these regions are becoming less common, especially in the lower 48 states.

More than 200 species of birds that pass through or use the park as a breeding ground have been recorded. These bird species include both golden and bald eagle as well as northern spotted owl, harlequin duck, Clark's nutcracker, trumpeter swan and seasonal appearances of western tanager, Cassin's vireo, pine grosbeak, woodpeckers such as the pileated woodpecker and primarily ground-dwelling birds such as the sooty grouse. The peregrine falcon is the only species found in the park that is federally designated as an endangered species, while the marbled murrelet and northern spotted owl are listed as threatened.

There are at least 28 species of fish documented, including all five species of Pacific salmon: pink, chinook (king), sockeye, coho and chum. Various trout species including rainbow, lake and brook trout can be found as can the largemouth bass and longnose dace.

Seven species of reptiles and about a dozen species of amphibians have been documented. Reptiles such as the northern alligator lizard and the common garter snake and amphibians such as the western toad, Pacific giant salamander and rough-skinned newt reside in the park.

More than 500 species of insects have been recorded, including at least two dozen species of butterflies. Around 250 species of aquatic invertebrates can be found in the parks waterways.

=== Fire ===
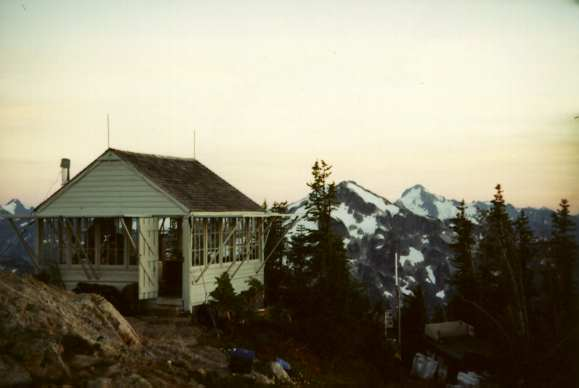
Copper Mountain Fire Lookout

In North Cascades National Park, fire was used by Native Americans in the region near present-day Ross Lake to clear out brush, to ease foot travel, and possibly to flush animals out of the foliage. Evidence found in the patterns of tree growth as well as from tree ring analysis indicates human-caused fires were created for many hundreds of years. Similar evidence is found in the Stehekin Valley, where both smaller low intensity fires and larger fires are suggested by the growth patterns and burn scars in tree ring evidence. The low-intensity fires that were likely human induced were only found in the easternmost regions of the park. In the subalpine regions such as the Thunder Creek area, the studies concluded fire occurs at frequencies ranging from 30 years to 400 years.

Across the entire North Cascades National Park Service Complex, between 1973 and 2003, there were 113 human-caused fires that burned 106 acres (43 ha), and 264 lightning-caused fires that burned 11,672 acres (4,723 ha). During this period, the largest fire consumed 4,118 acres (1,666 ha), mostly in Ross Lake National Recreation Area. North Cascades National Park Complex has three different zones with varying ratings for fire potential and severity. The park is managed as the Skagit Fire Management Unit (FMU) and has a low frequency of large natural fires that occur on average only every 50 to 400 years.

North Cascades National Park has a condition type that shows "...natural (historical) range of variability of vegetation characteristics; fuel composition; fire frequency, severity and pattern; and other associated disturbances." This condition type, in keeping with the wilderness designation applied to most of the park, equates to a natural "let it burn" policy overall, so long as people and historical property are not threatened and the fire was lightning-caused. As part of the management plan, the few historic structures in the FMU are prioritized for fire protection including backcountry shelters like Beaver Pass Shelter, and fire lookouts such as Sourdough, Desolation and Copper lookout, all of which are on the National Register of Historic Places.

== Climate ==
The Cascade Range is tall enough to cause a significant rain shadow on the eastern slopes. Annually, the western portions of the park receive 76 inches (190 cm) more precipitation than the eastern sections. The higher precipitation in the west also correlates to increased snowfall with 400 in (10,000 mm) more measured in the west than the east annually. On the western slopes, snowfall depths range from 50 to 75 in (130 to 190 cm) in lower altitudes annually, increasing to 400 to 600 in (1,000 to 1,500 cm) at elevations between 4,000 to 5,500 ft (1,200 to 1,700 m) above sea level. Snow depths peak in early March and range from 10 to 25 ft (3.0 to 7.6 m) depending on altitude.

Snow covers the ground more than six months out of the year, even at lower elevations, and State Route 20, the only highway through the park, is generally closed from late November until late April. Numerous avalanche chutes, as many as traverse any state or federal highway, and including some over 2,000 ft (610 m) long, cross the highway and make snow removal during that period infeasible. Heavy snow and frequent avalanches are common, especially on the western slopes, from autumn to spring. The high elevation trails are generally open by mid-summer and the majority of tourism is between mid-June and late September. The east side of the park is generally warmer and drier, especially in the summer with highs reaching 90 °F (32 °C). Since the 1950s, there has been a five-degree Fahrenheit (2.77 °C) mean winter minimum temperature increase at elevations above 4,000 ft (1,200 m). This has led to a reduced winter snowpack as the mean winter freezing level is now 650 ft (200 m) higher.

Overall the relative proximity of the Pacific Ocean moderates temperatures in the park, and it is warmer than other regions at a similar latitude farther inland.

Climate data for North Cascades Visitor Center, North Cascades National Park. Elev: 535 ft (163 m)
| Month | Jan | Feb | Mar | Apr | May | Jun | Jul | Aug | Sep | Oct | Nov | Dec | Year |
|---|---|---|---|---|---|---|---|---|---|---|---|---|---|
| Mean daily maximum °F (°C) | 40.9 (4.9) | 44.8 (7.1) | 51.0 (10.6) | 57.8 (14.3) | 65.3 (18.5) | 69.9 (21.1) | 76.7 (24.8) | 77.3 (25.2) | 70.4 (21.3) | 57.2 (14.0) | 45.9 (7.7) | 39.6 (4.2) | 58.1 (14.5) |
| Daily mean °F (°C) | 36.2 (2.3) | 38.2 (3.4) | 42.8 (6.0) | 48.1 (8.9) | 54.6 (12.6) | 59.6 (15.3) | 64.6 (18.1) | 65.0 (18.3) | 59.2 (15.1) | 49.4 (9.7) | 40.8 (4.9) | 35.3 (1.8) | 49.5 (9.7) |
| Mean daily minimum °F (°C) | 31.5 (−0.3) | 31.5 (−0.3) | 34.6 (1.4) | 38.5 (3.6) | 44.0 (6.7) | 49.2 (9.6) | 52.5 (11.4) | 52.8 (11.6) | 47.9 (8.8) | 41.5 (5.3) | 35.7 (2.1) | 31.0 (−0.6) | 40.9 (4.9) |
| Average precipitation inches (mm) | 9.75 (248) | 6.15 (156) | 5.60 (142) | 4.00 (102) | 2.78 (71) | 2.59 (66) | 1.41 (36) | 1.37 (35) | 2.79 (71) | 7.66 (195) | 10.49 (266) | 8.24 (209) | 62.83 (1,596) |
| Average relative humidity (%) | 81.9 | 74.8 | 68.1 | 57.7 | 55.5 | 55.4 | 50.1 | 48.9 | 51.4 | 59.8 | 82.5 | 84.9 | 64.2 |
| Average dew point °F (°C) | 31.2 (−0.4) | 30.9 (−0.6) | 33.0 (0.6) | 33.9 (1.1) | 39.0 (3.9) | 43.6 (6.4) | 45.6 (7.6) | 45.3 (7.4) | 41.3 (5.2) | 36.0 (2.2) | 35.9 (2.2) | 31.2 (−0.4) | 37.3 (2.9) |
| Mean monthly sunshine hours | 62.0 | 84.8 | 155.0 | 180.0 | 217.0 | 240.0 | 279.0 | 248.0 | 180.0 | 155.0 | 60.0 | 62.0 | 1,922.8 |
| Mean daily sunshine hours | 2 | 3 | 5 | 6 | 7 | 8 | 9 | 8 | 6 | 5 | 2 | 2 | 5 |
| Mean daily daylight hours | 8.8 | 10.2 | 11.9 | 13.7 | 15.3 | 16.1 | 15.7 | 14.3 | 12.6 | 10.8 | 9.2 | 8.3 | 12.2 |
| Percentage possible sunshine | 23 | 29 | 42 | 44 | 46 | 50 | 57 | 56 | 48 | 46 | 22 | 24 | 41 |
| Average ultraviolet index | 1 | 2 | 3 | 5 | 6 | 7 | 7 | 7 | 5 | 3 | 1 | 1 | 4 |
Source 1: PRISM Climate Group
Source 2: Weather Atlas (sun data)

=== Air and water quality ===
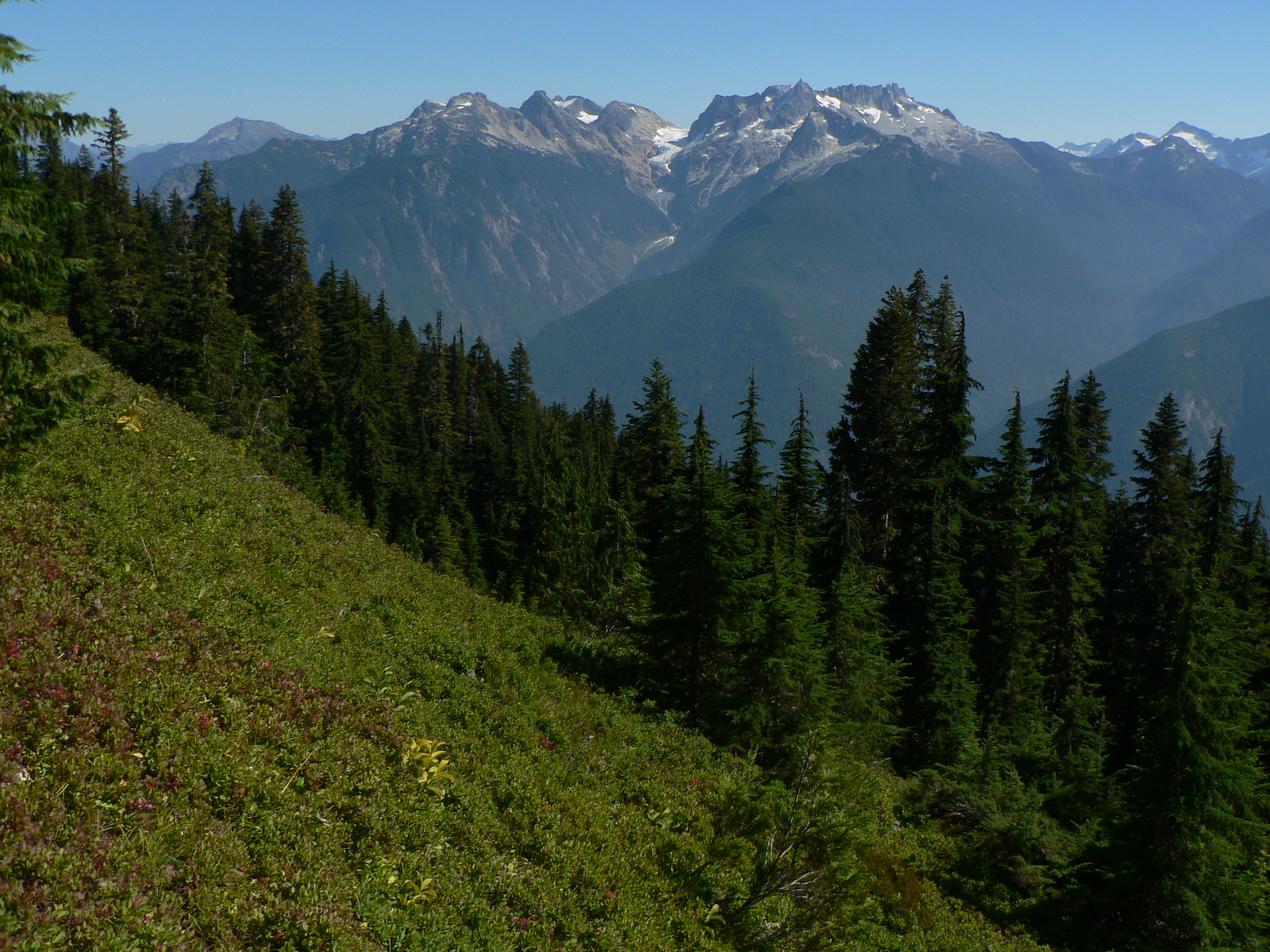
Air quality in North Cascades National Park is generally considered good and aside from some reduced clarity due to haze, even distant peaks are easily seen most days.

While North Cascades National Park is in a remote region for the most part, the prevailing westerly winds bring various pollutants into the park from the industrialized region around Puget Sound and the Fraser River Valley of British Columbia. These pollutants deposit onto plants and glaciers and are then carried by rainfall or ice melt and dispersed into rivers and lakes. The industrialized regions around Puget Sound and the Fraser River Valley have had a more noticeable negative impact on water and air quality than at Mount Rainier National Park well to the south due to the prevailing winds. Lakes at higher elevations show a higher level of acidity due to this phenomenon; the current and long-term impact on the ecosystem of the park has not yet been fully assessed.

Mercury and toxins from pesticides have been detected in the park, as has ozone; these have not been demonstrated to be at sufficient concentrations to greatly impact the ecosystem. Sulfur, nitrogen dioxide and ozone from factories and automobile emissions as well as increased dust and fine particulates from sources such as farming and construction are dispersed into the atmosphere, reducing long-range visibility. Visibilities of up to 150 mi (240 km) have been reduced to less than 50 mi (80 km) on the worst days due to the increased haze.

Climate change will impact the temperatures of high altitude lakes and streams, which in turn will have an effect on the fish that can thrive in these waters. Retreating glaciers reduce the amount of glacial ice melt available in warmer months that kept streams and lakes cold, even in late summer.

== Attractions ==
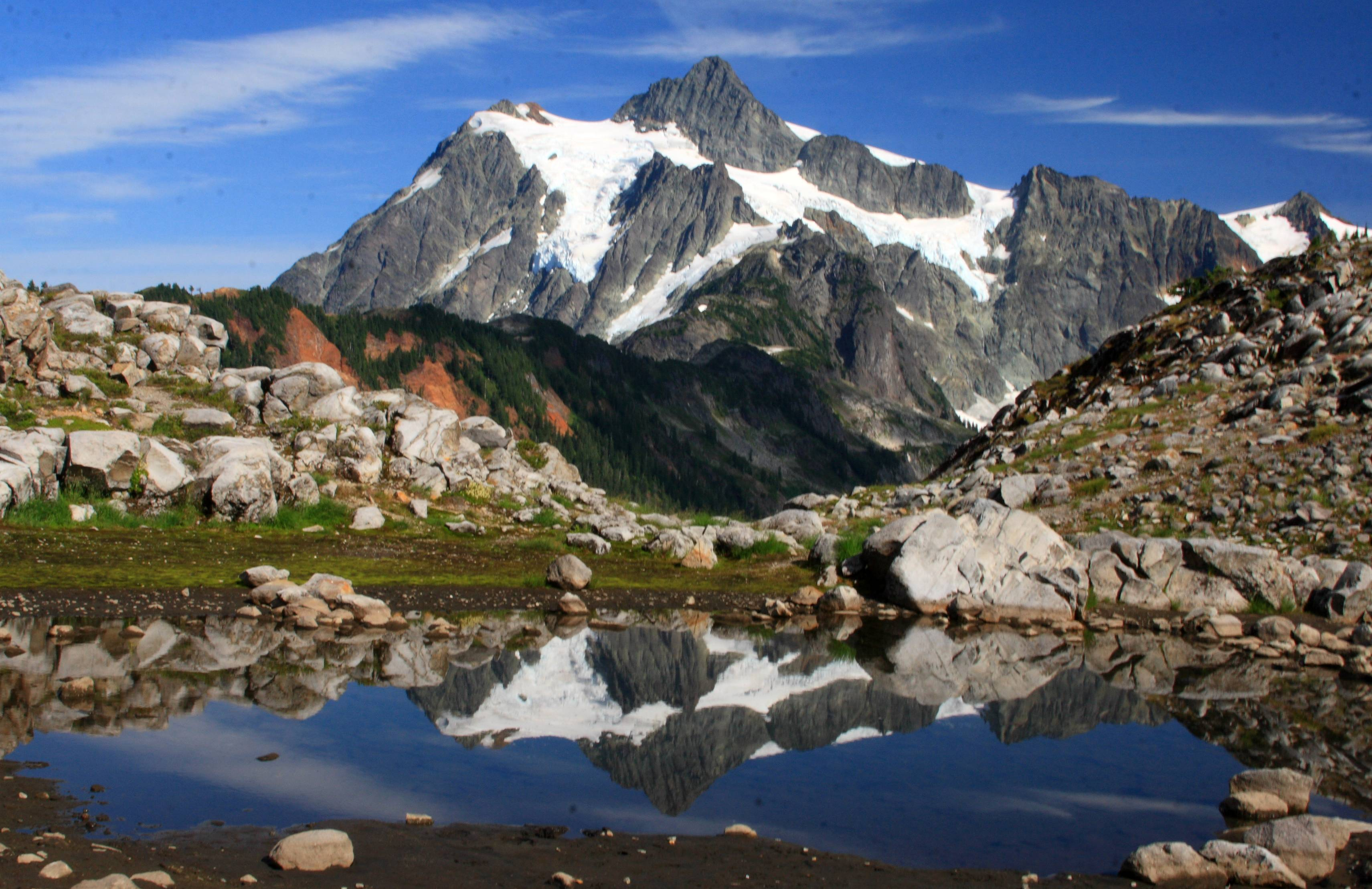
Mount Shuksan

North Cascades National Park is approximately 100 mi (160 km) northeast of Seattle. Nearly all of the national park is protected as the Stephen Mather Wilderness and it is "one of the premier wilderness parks" in the lower-48 states". Unlike some national parks, there is no entrance fee at North Cascades, and hiking trailheads accessed by vehicle do not require a parking pass; trailheads on some national forest properties adjacent to the park may require a pass. Mount Shuksan, in the northwest corner of the park, is often photographed, and at 9,131 ft (2,783 m) is the second highest peak in the park.

=== Camping, hiking and bicycling ===
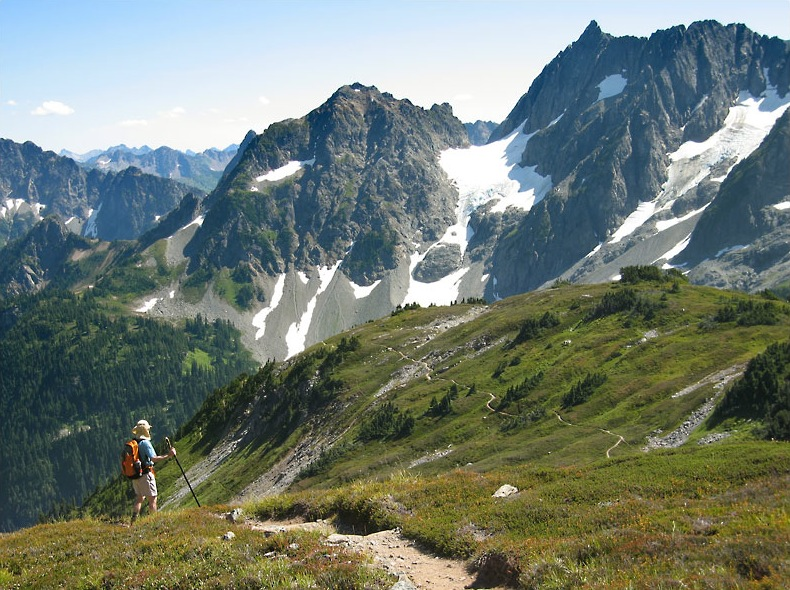
Hiking at Sahale Arm near Cascade Pass

Hikers and backpackers often visit Cascade Pass in the southwestern section of the southern unit of the park, which was used as a travel route by Native Americans. The pass can be reached by a 3.7-mile (6.0 km) hiking trail accessed from a parking lot at the end of a gravel road that starts at Marblemount. There are nearly 400 mi (640 km) of hiking trails in the park. Hikers can also access two National Scenic Trails including 18 mi (29 km) of the Pacific Crest Trail in the southern unit of the park and 63 mi (101 km) of the Pacific Northwest Trail that passes through the northern unit. The north and south Picket Ranges, Mount Triumph, Eldorado Peak and Boston Peak regions are popular backcountry camping zones.

Unlike most US national parks, there are no places within North Cascades National Park where one can drive to a campground. There are many vehicular access camp grounds in Ross Lake National Recreation Area and in surrounding national forests. All overnight camping is considered backcountry camping and camping areas are protected to prevent overcrowding. Backcountry camping spots can be reserved in early spring only; walk-up permits can be obtained at the Wilderness Information Center near Marblemount. Since the vast majority of the park is designated wilderness, the goal is to ensure all hikers and backcountry travelers enjoy the opportunities for solitude. Group sizes are limited to parties of less than a dozen on what are known as trail and camping corridors, and in more remote areas off trails, groups larger than six are not permitted.

Bicycles are allowed in the park but only on the same roads that vehicles are allowed on. No mountain bike access is allowed on hiking trails. Hiker/biker camping is available at Newhalem Campground, Colonial Creek, and near Stehekin.

=== Mountaineering ===
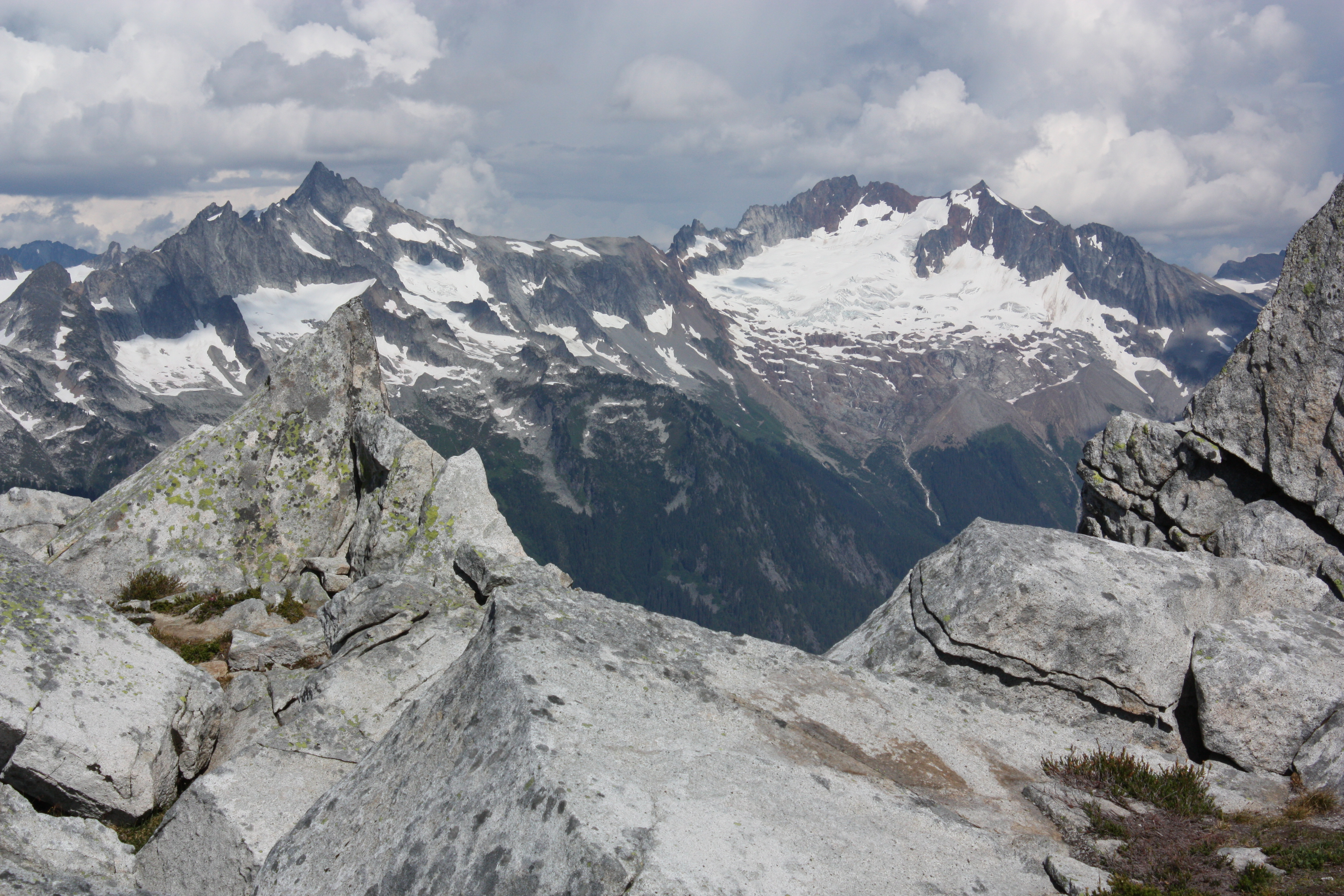
Pyramidal Forbidden Peak (left) is one of the Fifty Classic Climbs of North America. Quien Sabe Glacier shrouds the west face of Boston Peak (right) below extensive cliffs.

High quality climbing routes on the numerous cliffs, ice and other challenges make the park a favorite destination for many mountaineering enthusiasts. While some peaks and cliffs can be accessed fairly easily, the most remote ones entail a multi-day excursion, challenging for even experienced mountaineers. The park has banned the installation of any new fixed anchors such as pitons, and only removable anchors such as chocks and cams are permitted. This clean climbing has been implemented to help protect the resource, since fixed point anchors deface the rock and are considered intrusive.

With much of the rock climbing and mountaineering done above the tree line, the effort to protect alpine ecosystems is of paramount importance. Leave No Trace policies are strictly enforced and encouraged, such as camping only on bare rock, using only a camp stove, storing food safely where animals cannot get to it, and carrying out or properly burying human waste as necessary. Mountaineering in the North Cascades was first popularized by Fred Beckey; at age 15 he was the first to reach the summit of Sinister Peak in 1938, in 1939 he was the first atop Mount Despair, and the following year he was the first to climb Forbidden Peak. Beckey was the first to summit at least two dozen peaks in the North Cascades, and his exhaustive three-volume Cascade Alpine Guide books, first published in the early 1970s, have been called the "Beckey Bible".

== See also ==
- List of national parks of the United States
- National Register of Historic Places listings in North Cascades National Park
