= Depot Glacier (Washington) =

Glacier in the state of Washington

- Depot Glacier (center left) and West Depot Glacier (center right) are separated by a ridge on the north slope of Mount Redoubt.

- Location within Washington (state)
- Type: Mountain glacier
- Location: Whatcom County, Washington, U.S.
- Coordinates: 48°57′29″N 121°18′06″W
- Length: .65 mi (1.05 km)
- Terminus: Barren rock and icefall
- Status: Retreating

Depot Glacier is in North Cascades National Park in the U.S. state of Washington, on the northeast slopes of Mount Redoubt. Depot Glacier descends from the 7,400 to 6,000 ft (2,300 to 1,800 m). Melt from the glacier feeds into Depot Creek which flows into Chilliwack Lake. The Redoubt Glacier lies to the east while the West Depot Glacier is separated from Depot Glacier by a ridge.

== See also ==
- List of glaciers in the United States
