= West Depot Glacier =

Glacier in the state of Washington

- Depot Glacier (center left) and West Depot Glacier (center right) are separated by a ridge on the north slope of Mount Redoubt.

- Location within Washington (state)
- Type: Mountain glacier
- Location: Whatcom County, Washington, U.S.
- Coordinates: 48°57′29″N 121°18′06″W
- Length: .70 mi (1.13 km)
- Terminus: Barren rock and icefall
- Status: Retreating

West Depot Glacier is in North Cascades National Park in the U.S. state of Washington, on the north slopes of Mount Redoubt. Depot Glacier descends from 7,400 to 5,900 ft (2,300 to 1,800 m). Melt from the glacier feeds into Depot Creek which flows into Chilliwack Lake. A ridge separates West Depot Glacier from Depot Glacier to the east.

== See also ==
- List of glaciers in the United States
