= Mount Lindeman =

Mountain in the country of Canada

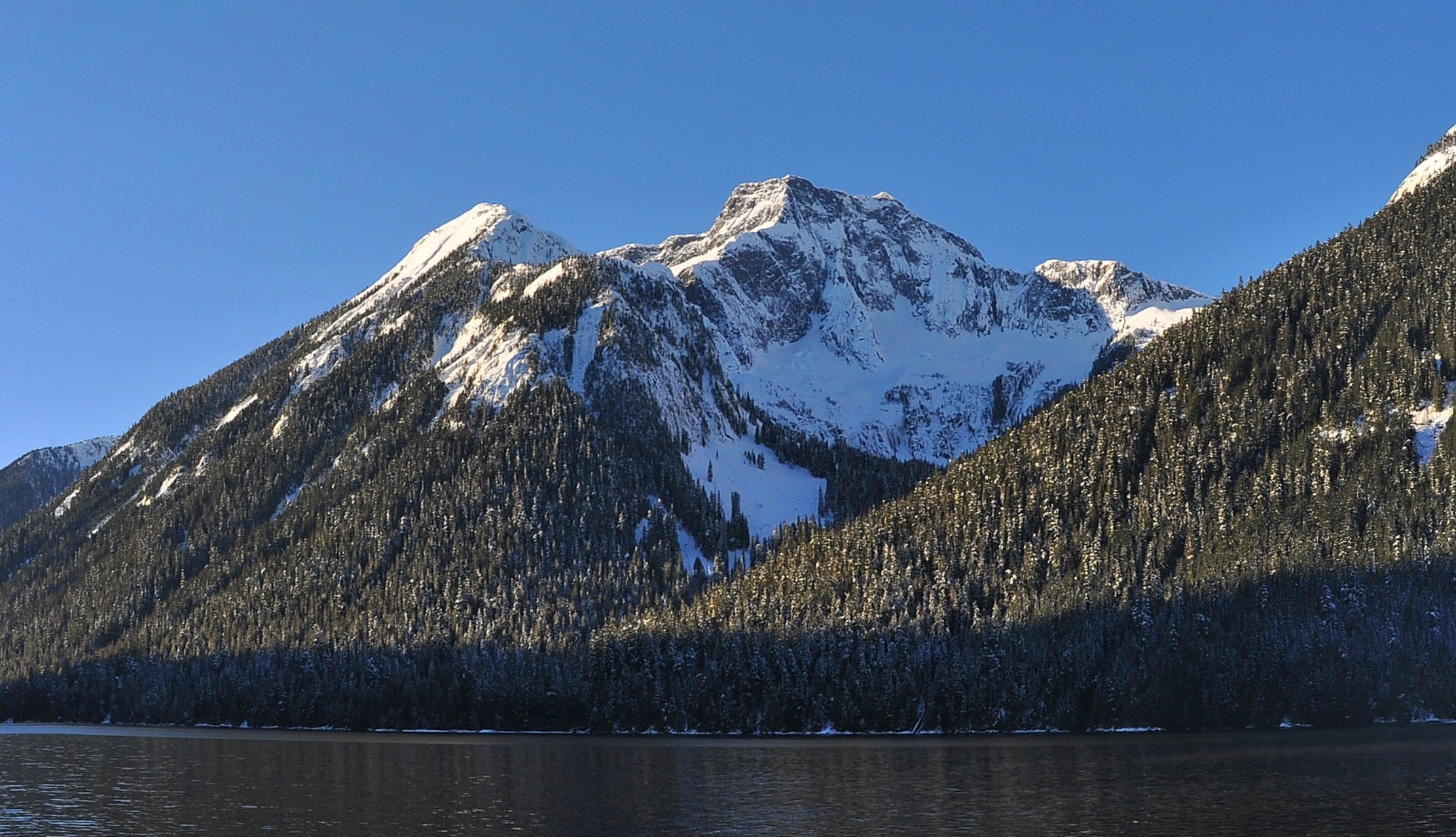
- Northeast aspect, from Chilliwack Lake

Highest point
- Elevation: 2,312 m (7,585 ft)
- Prominence: 462 m (1,516 ft)
- Parent peak: Mount Rexford (2,329 m)
- Isolation: 5.6 km (3.5 mi)
- Listing: Mountains of British Columbia
- Coordinates: 49°00′48″N 121°27′14″W

Naming
- Etymology: Charles Lindeman

Geography
- Location within British Columbia Location within Canada
- Interactive map of Mount Lindeman
- Country: Canada
- Province: British Columbia
- District: Yale Division Yale Land District
- Parent range: Cascade Range; North Cascades
- Topo map: NTS 92H3 Skagit River

Geology
- Mountain type: Fault block
- Rock type: Granitic

Climbing
- First ascent: 1859
- Easiest route: Scrambling via SW route

Mount Lindeman is a 2,312-meter-elevation (7,585-foot) mountain summit located in the North Cascades in British Columbia, Canada.

== Description ==
Mount Lindeman is set 1.6 km (0.99 mi) north of the Canada–United States border and is the highest peak within Sx̱ótsaqel/Chilliwack Lake Provincial Park. This sharp peak is situated immediately north of Hanging Lake, west of the southern tip of Chilliwack Lake, and 2.6 km (1.6 mi) northeast of Middle Peak. The nearest higher neighbor is Mount Rexford, 5.6 km (3 mi) to the northwest. Other peaks which can be seen from the summit include Mount Baker, Mount Shuksan, Mount Redoubt, Mount Challenger, Slesse, and many more. Mount Lindeman is more notable for its steep rise above local terrain than for its absolute elevation. Topographic relief is significant as the summit rises 1,700 meters (5,600 feet) above Chilliwack Lake in three kilometers (1.9 miles). Precipitation runoff from this mountain drains into the lake and Centre Creek which are both within the Chilliwack River watershed.

== Climbing history ==
The first ascent of the summit was possibly made in July 1859 by surveyor Henry Custer and George Gibbs, but cannot be verified. The steep north face was first climbed in October 1971 by Alice Purdey, Dick Culbert and Fred Douglas. The first winter ascent was made by Don Serl, Robert Tomlich and Herb Haberl in January 1980. Bruce Fairley and John Manuel were first to climb the east ridge in September 1982. The North Couloir was first climbed by Rob Freeman, Tim Hudson, John Petroske and Ken Johnson on November 14, 1986.

== Etymology ==
The mountain was named after Charles Otto Lindeman (1869–1943), a trapper and prospector in this Chilliwack Lake area for 30 years from 1911 to 1942. The toponym was officially adopted January 17, 1951, by the Geographical Names Board of Canada. Lindeman Lake, north of Chilliwack Lake, is also named for this same reclusive trapper who lived here.

== Climate ==
Mount Lindeman is located in the marine west coast climate zone of western North America. Most weather fronts originate in the Pacific Ocean, and travel northeast toward the Cascade Mountains. As fronts approach the North Cascades, they are forced upward by the peaks of the Cascade Range (Orographic lift), causing them to drop their moisture in the form of rain or snowfall onto the Cascades. As a result, the west side of the North Cascades experiences high precipitation, especially during the winter months in the form of snowfall. Due to its temperate climate and proximity to the Pacific Ocean, areas west of the Cascade Crest very rarely experience temperatures below 0 °F (−18 °C) or above 80 °F (27 °C). During winter months, weather is usually cloudy, but due to high pressure systems over the Pacific Ocean that intensify during summer months, there is often little or no cloud cover during the summer. Because of maritime influence, snow tends to be wet and heavy, resulting in high avalanche danger. This climate supports small glacial remnants on the north slope. The months July through September offer the most favorable weather for viewing or climbing this peak.

== Geology ==
The North Cascades feature some of the most rugged topography in the Cascade Range with craggy peaks, ridges, and deep glacial valleys. Geological events occurring many years ago created the diverse topography and drastic elevation changes over the Cascade Range leading to various climate differences.

The history of the formation of the Cascade Mountains dates back millions of years ago to the late Eocene Epoch. With the North American Plate overriding the Pacific Plate, episodes of volcanic igneous activity persisted. In addition, small fragments of the oceanic and continental lithosphere called terranes created the North Cascades about 50 million years ago.

During the Pleistocene period dating back over two million years ago, glaciation advancing and retreating repeatedly scoured the landscape leaving deposits of rock debris. The U-shaped cross section of the river valleys is a result of recent glaciation. Uplift and faulting in combination with glaciation have been the dominant processes which have created the tall peaks and deep valleys of the North Cascades area.

== Gallery ==
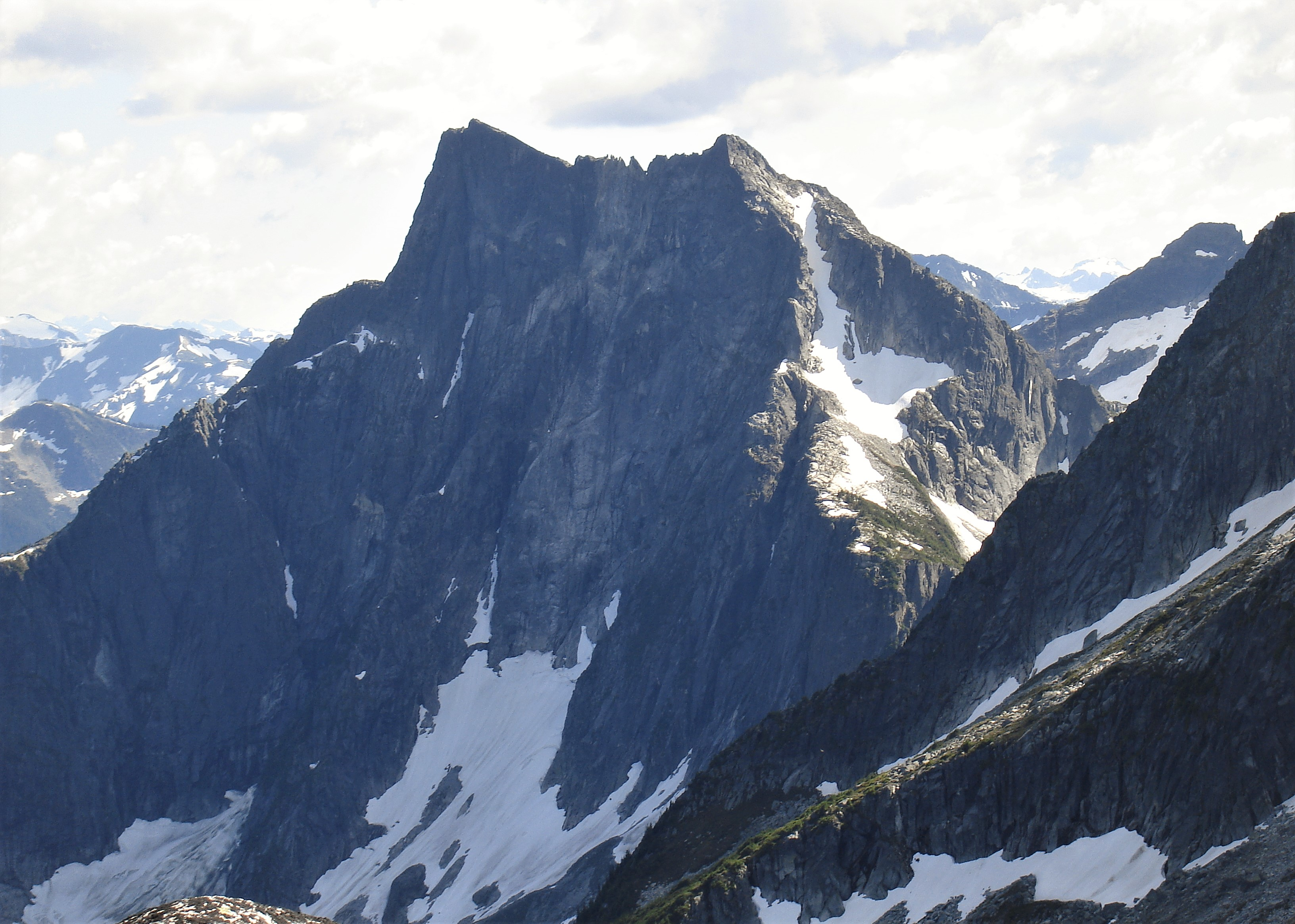
Lindeman's north face

== See also ==
- Geography of the North Cascades
