= Silver Lake (North Cascades) =

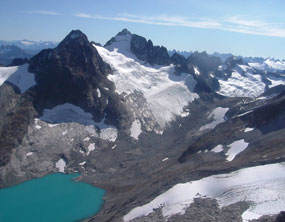
- Silver Lake below Silver Glacier in background

- Location within Washington (state) Location within the United States
- Location: North Cascades National Park, Whatcom County, Washington, United States
- Coordinates: 48°59′15″N 121°13′56″W
- Type: Lake
- Primary outflows: Silver Creek
- Basin countries: United States
- Surface area: 0.26 km^{2} (0.10 sq mi)
- Max. depth: 525 feet (160 m)
- Surface elevation: 6,763 ft (2,061 m)

Silver Lake is a small, deep alpine lake in northwestern Washington, United States, within the northeastern portion of North Cascades National Park, near the border with the Canadian province of British Columbia. It is located within a high-altitude cirque and is primarily fed by Silver Glacier on the slopes of Mount Spickard, and drains through Silver Creek, ultimately into Ross Lake. It was first documented in 1905 and declared a Research Natural Area in 1974.

== Description ==
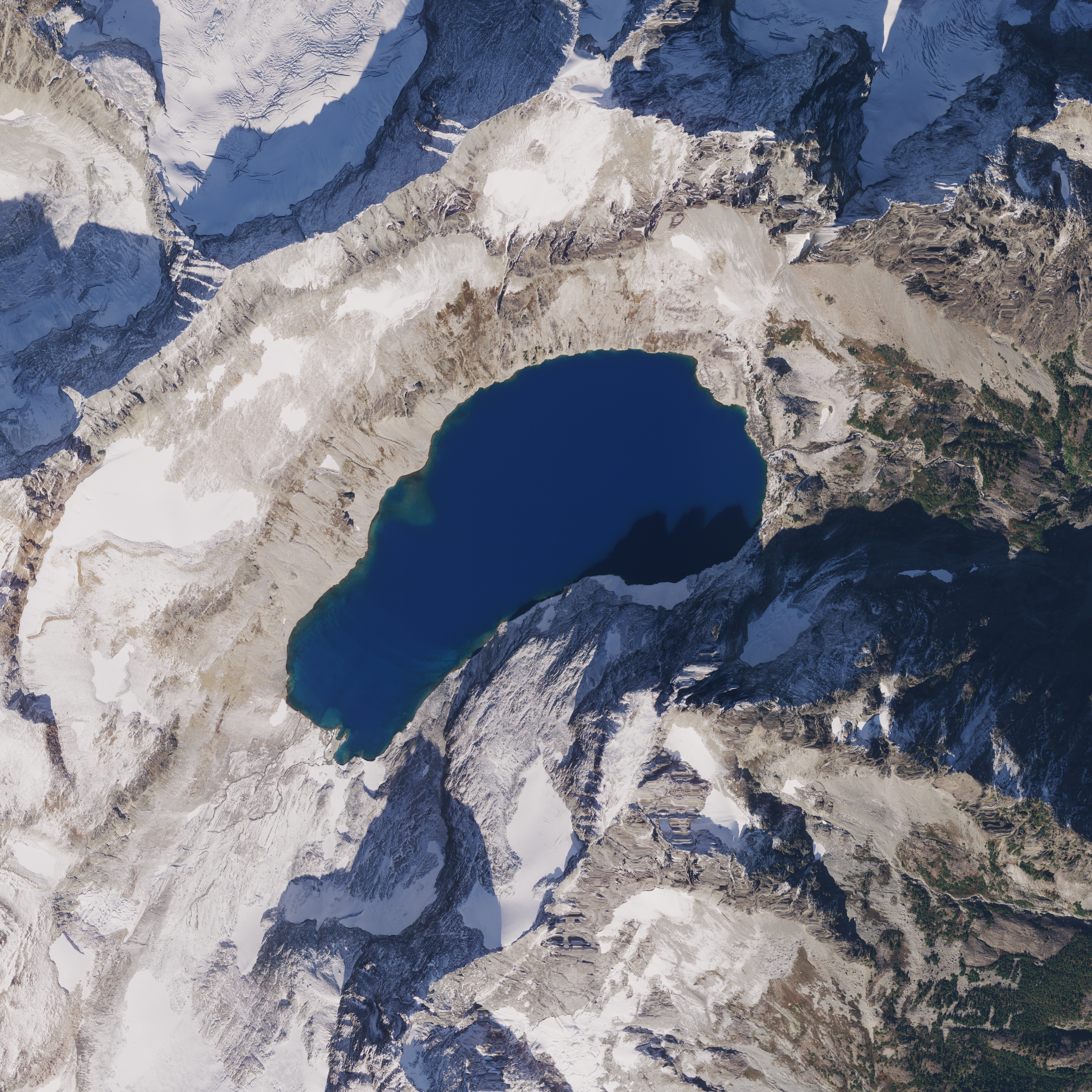
Silver Lake from above (2017)

Silver Lake is an alpine cirque lake in the Cascade Range of Washington state, U.S. It is situated in the northeastern corner of the North Cascades National Park, about 0.6 mi (1 km) south of the border with the Canadian province of British Columbia. It lies within the Silver Lake Research Natural Area (RNA), a 1,687-acre (683 ha) area under strict ecological protection for research purposes. The cirque is bound by the Custer Ridge to the northwest and Mount Spickard to the southwest. Although only 0.26 square miles (0.67 km^{2}) in area, it is extremely deep for its size, reaching a maximum depth of 525 feet (160 m). It is one of the highest lakes in the national park, with a surface elevation of 6,763 ft (2,061 m).

The lake is primarily fed by Silver Glacier (also known as Silver Creek Glacier), a 121-acre (0.49 km^{2}) glacier on the northeastern slope of Mount Spickard. Eleven other active glaciers are located in the surrounding Research National Area. Its inlet stream lake flows over patches of rock and gravel and drains into the southwestern portion of the lake. The lake is drained by Silver Creek, a fast-flowing stream which drops steeply from the edge of the cirque into a narrow valley. It flows east-southeast into Ross Lake, a reservoir of the Skagit River which itself drains into the Puget Sound. The high-altitude alpine climate of the area surrounding the lake experiences dry summers and frequent precipitation throughout the rest of the year. It mostly falls as snow and sleet during the autumn and winter, but rains during the spring. Measurements from August 1979 give a surface temperature of 46.9 °F (8.3 °C), estimated to fall to 39.2 °F (4.0 °C) at the lake's bottom.

=== Biology ===
The lake basin mainly consists of talus slopes (extending to around a 1,000 ft (300 m) above the lake's surface in some areas), steep cliffs, and outcroppings of rock alongside glaciers and snowfields. Due to erosion and avalanches, there is very little vegetation in much of the lake basin. To the northwest of the lake, mats of plants such as Salix cascadensis (Cascade willow) occur on outcrops, while Chamaenerion latifolium (dwarf fireweed) is common along ephemeral seepages on the talus slopes. Meadows of Dasiphora fruticosa (shrubby cinquefoil) are found on plateaus in the basin. Much of the eastern rim of the lake around the outlet of Silver Creek has sparse vegetation, with some communities of heather in pockets within barren terrain.

The lake was stocked with golden trout in 1961 as part of fish stocking efforts throughout the North Cascades during the early 20th century. These efforts did not seem to result in a permanent population, and it is currently believed to be fishless. There is little sign of disturbance in the lake basin by either humans or animals.

=== History ===
The cirque basin the lake lies in was formed from repeated scouring from the Cordilleran ice sheet during the Quaternary glaciation and subsequent bouts of neoglaciation over the course of the Holocene. The geologist Reginald Daly mapped the area in 1904–1905, but did not include the lake on his map. Instead, ice is shown occupying what would be the northeast corner of the lake. However, in 1905, the surveyor Thomas Riggs commented on a "lake of indigo" featuring free-floating ice that he had discovered while searching for an ascent route for Mount Spickard. A United States Geological Survey map published in 1913 shows the lake (labeled "Glacier Lake"), with the Silver Creek glacier encroaching on about a third of its present surface area. The glacier retreated considerably over the course of the 20th century, and a portion the terminus of the glacier calved into the lake in 1970.

The lake basin was declared a Research Natural Area in March 1974, as it was seen as a useful model for alpine cirque lakes in the region. A 1984 report noted that it was accessible only by helicopter or by a 2–3 day cross-country hike, with no trails leading to the lake.
