= Middle Peak (Washington) =

Mountain in Washington (state), United States

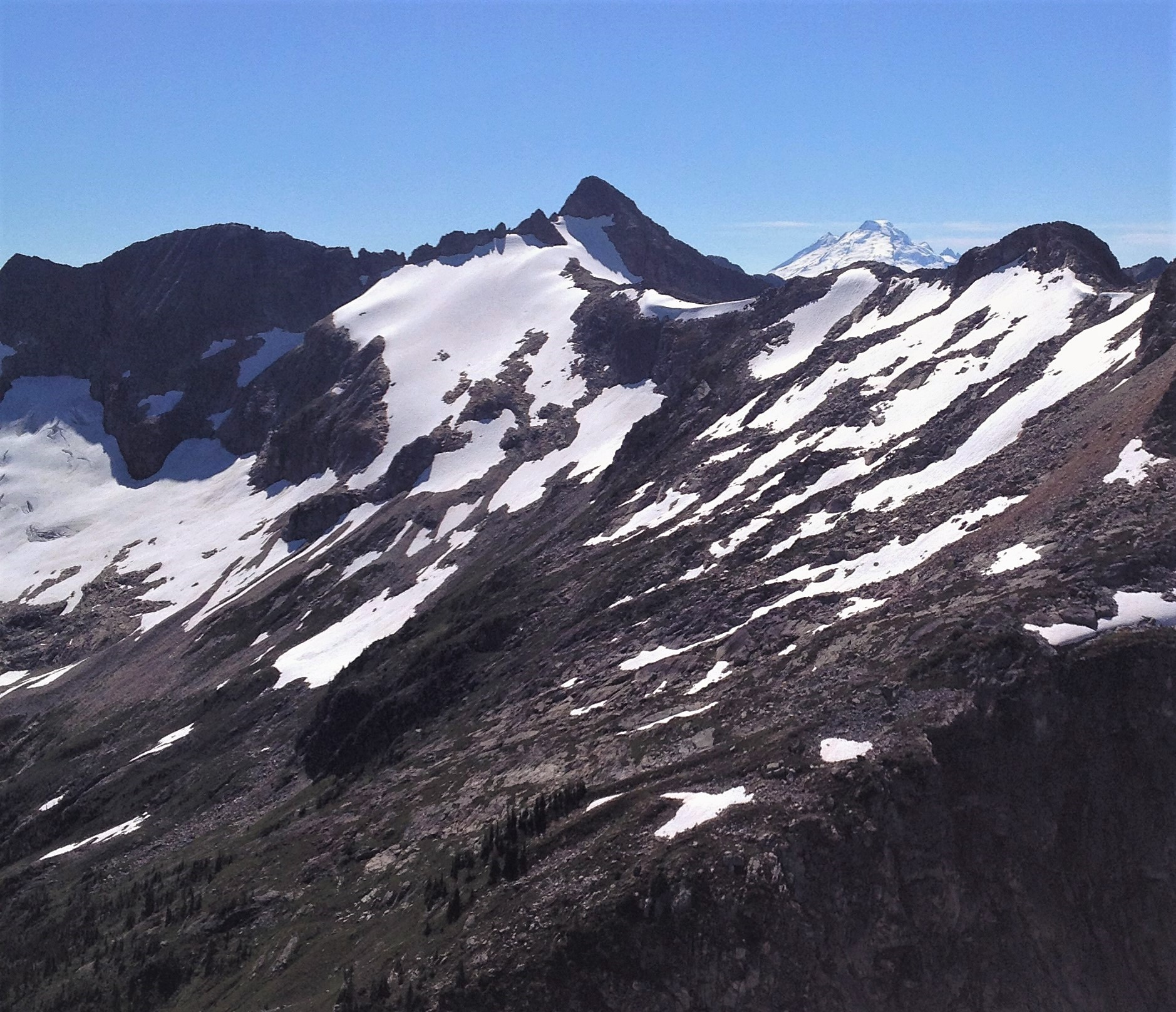
- Northeast aspect

Highest point
- Elevation: 7,464 ft (2,275 m)
- Prominence: 870 ft (265 m)
- Parent peak: Mount Lindeman (7,585 ft)
- Isolation: 1.61 mi (2.59 km)
- Coordinates: 48°59′43″N 121°28′39″W

Geography
- Location within Washington (state) Location within the United States
- Interactive map of Middle Peak
- Country: United States
- State: Washington
- County: Whatcom
- Protected area: North Cascades National Park
- Parent range: Cascade Range; North Cascades
- Topo map: USGS Copper Mountain

Climbing
- First ascent: 1908

Middle Peak is a 7,464-foot-elevation (2,275-meter) mountain summit located in the North Cascades in Whatcom County of Washington state, United States.

== Description ==
Middle Peak is set one-third mile south of the Canada–United States border near Boundary Monument No. 60. It is within North Cascades National Park and Stephen Mather Wilderness. This sharp peak is situated immediately west of Hanging Lake, four miles southwest of the southern tip of Chilliwack Lake, and 3.4 mi (5.5 km) southeast of Mount Rexford. The nearest higher neighbor is Mount Lindeman, 1.6 mi (2.6 km) to the northeast, and Mount Redoubt is 8.1 mi (13.0 km) to the southeast. Other peaks which can be seen from the summit include Mount Baker, Mount Shuksan, Mount Challenger, Copper Mountain, and many more. Middle Peak is more notable for its steep rise above local terrain than for its absolute elevation. Topographic relief is significant as the summit rises 4,000 feet above the Little Chilliwack River in two miles. Precipitation runoff from this mountain drains into the Little Chilliwack and headwaters of Centre Creek which are both tributaries of the Chilliwack River.

== History ==
The first ascent of the peak's 7,160-foot-elevation southwest summit was made July 8, 1859, by surveyor Henry Custer and party during a reconnaissance. The first ascent of Middle Peak was made June 30, 1908, by James J. McArthur, a Canadian surveyor of the International Boundary Commission. Paragliders have lifted off from the summit and landed at the upper end of Chilliwack Lake.

== Climate ==
Middle Peak is located in the marine west coast climate zone of western North America. Most weather fronts originating in the Pacific Ocean travel northeast toward the Cascade Mountains. As fronts approach the North Cascades, they are forced upward by the peaks of the Cascade Range (orographic lift), causing them to drop their moisture in the form of rain or snowfall onto the Cascades. As a result, the west side of the North Cascades experiences high precipitation, especially during the winter months in the form of snowfall. Because of maritime influence, snow tends to be wet and heavy, resulting in high avalanche danger. During winter months, weather is usually cloudy, but due to high pressure systems over the Pacific Ocean that intensify during summer months, there is often little or no cloud cover during the summer. Due to its temperate climate and proximity to the Pacific Ocean, areas west of the Cascade Crest very rarely experience temperatures below 0 °F (−18 °C) or above 80 °F (27 °C). This climate supports small glacial remnants on the north slope above Hanging Lake. The months July through September offer the most favorable weather for viewing or climbing this peak.

== Geology ==
The North Cascades feature some of the most rugged topography in the Cascade Range with craggy peaks, ridges, and deep glacial valleys. Geological events occurring many years ago created the diverse topography and drastic elevation changes over the Cascade Range leading to various climate differences.

The history of the formation of the Cascade Mountains dates back millions of years ago to the late Eocene Epoch. With the North American Plate overriding the Pacific Plate, episodes of volcanic igneous activity persisted. In addition, small fragments of the oceanic and continental lithosphere called terranes created the North Cascades about 50 million years ago.

During the Pleistocene period dating back over two million years ago, glaciation advancing and retreating repeatedly scoured the landscape leaving deposits of rock debris. The U-shaped cross section of the river valleys is a result of recent glaciation. Uplift and faulting in combination with glaciation have been the dominant processes which have created the tall peaks and deep valleys of the North Cascades area.

== Gallery ==
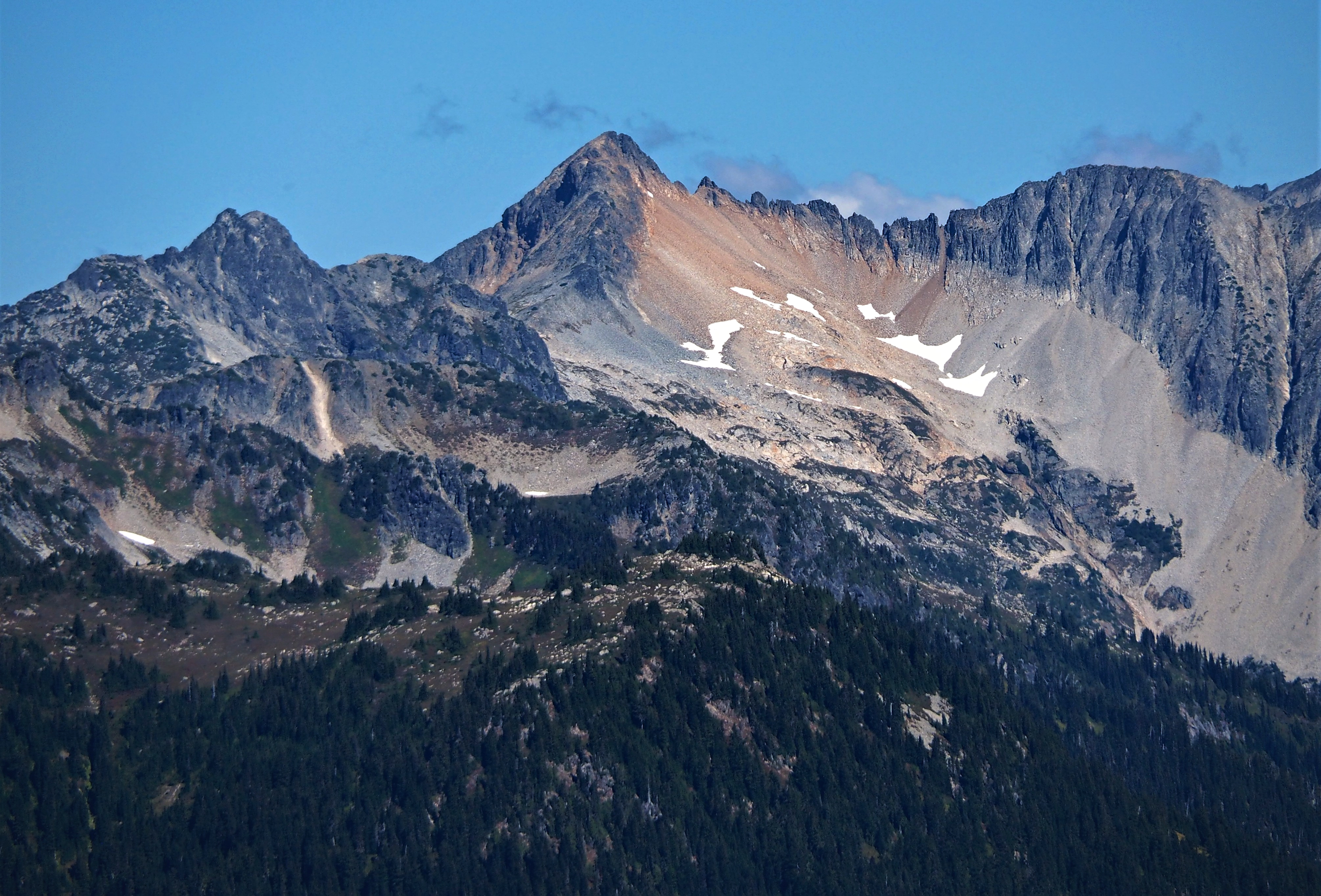
South aspect

== See also ==
- Geology of the Pacific Northwest
- Geography of the North Cascades
