= Mount Webb (British Columbia) =

Mountain in the North Cascades, British Columbia, Canada

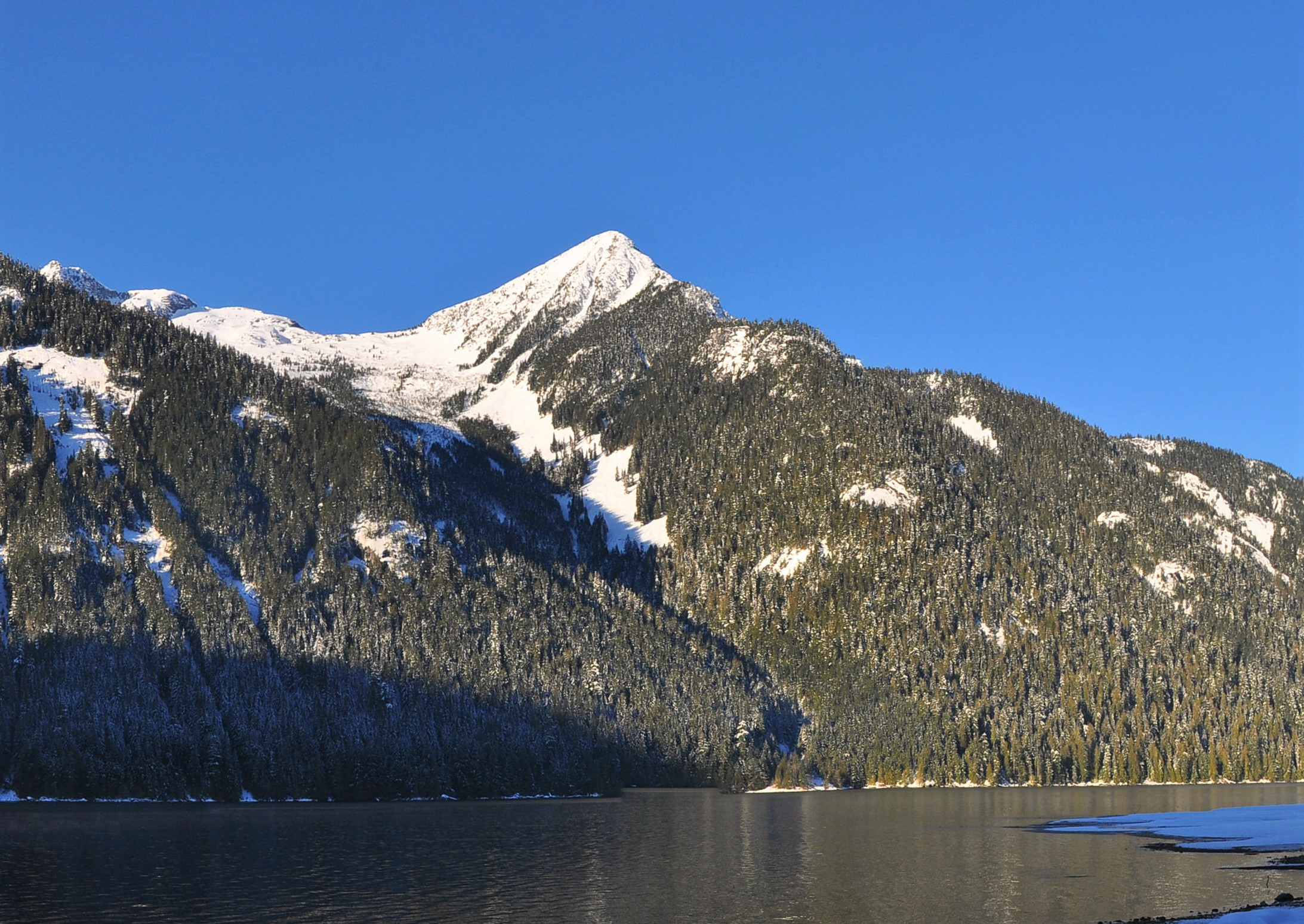
- East aspect, from Chilliwack Lake

Highest point
- Elevation: 2,164 m (7,100 ft)
- Prominence: 254 m (833 ft)
- Parent peak: Macdonald Peak (2,247 m)
- Isolation: 1.52 km (0.94 mi)
- Listing: Mountains of British Columbia
- Coordinates: 49°03′04″N 121°27′24″W

Geography
- Location within British Columbia Location within Canada
- Interactive map of Mount Webb
- Country: Canada
- Province: British Columbia
- District: Yale Division Yale Land District
- Parent range: Cascade Range; North Cascades
- Topo map: NTS 92H3 Skagit River

Geology
- Mountain type: Fault block

Climbing
- First ascent: 1859
- Easiest route: Scrambling

Mount Webb is a 2,164-meter-elevation (7,100-foot) mountain summit located in the North Cascades in British Columbia, Canada.

== Description ==
Mount Webb is set 5 km (3.1 mi) north of the Canada–United States border and is within Sx̱ótsaqel/Chilliwack Lake Provincial Park. This peak is situated immediately west of Chilliwack Lake, and 2.6 km (1.6 mi) north of Mount Lindeman. Mount Webb is more notable for its steep rise above local terrain than for its absolute elevation. Topographic relief is significant as the summit rises 1,560 meters (5,120 feet) above Chilliwack Lake in two kilometers (1.2 miles). Precipitation runoff from this mountain drains east into the lake and west into Radium Creek which are both within the Chilliwack River watershed. The nearest higher neighbor is Macdonald Peak, 1.6 km (1 mi) to the south.

== Climbing history ==
The first ascent of the summit was possibly made in August 1859 by surveyor Henry Custer and George Gibbs, but cannot be verified. The first ascent via the west face was made July 1984 by Kevin Haberl and Anders Ourom. The Northeast Buttress was first climbed September 1997 by Doug Wilm, Drew Brayshaw, Eric Hutton and Carl Fleet.

== Etymology ==
The mountain was named after Christopher E. Webb, a consulting engineer with Federal Water Resources and later senior hydroelectric engineer for BC Electric Company. He first visited this area in 1916, while searching for the headwaters of Chilliwack River and a potential source of hydroelectric power for lower mainland communities. He and his wife purchased property at the north end of Chilliwack Lake in 1927, and built a one-room log cabin there in 1929. The toponym was officially adopted February 24, 1975, by the Geographical Names Board of Canada.

== Climate ==
Mount Webb is located in the marine west coast climate zone of western North America. Most weather fronts originate in the Pacific Ocean, and travel northeast toward the Cascade Mountains. As fronts approach the North Cascades, they are forced upward by the peaks of the Cascade Range (Orographic lift), causing them to drop their moisture in the form of rain or snowfall onto the Cascades. As a result, the west side of the North Cascades experiences high precipitation, especially during the winter months in the form of snowfall. Due to its temperate climate and proximity to the Pacific Ocean, areas west of the Cascade Crest very rarely experience temperatures below 0 °F (−18 °C) or above 80 °F (27 °C). During winter months, weather is usually cloudy, but due to high pressure systems over the Pacific Ocean that intensify during summer months, there is often little or no cloud cover during the summer. Because of maritime influence, snow tends to be wet and heavy, resulting in high avalanche danger. The months July through September offer the most favorable weather for viewing or climbing this peak.

== Geology ==
The North Cascades feature some of the most rugged topography in the Cascade Range with craggy peaks, ridges, and deep glacial valleys. Geological events occurring many years ago created the diverse topography and drastic elevation changes over the Cascade Range leading to various climate differences.

The history of the formation of the Cascade Mountains dates back millions of years ago to the late Eocene Epoch. With the North American Plate overriding the Pacific Plate, episodes of volcanic igneous activity persisted. In addition, small fragments of the oceanic and continental lithosphere called terranes created the North Cascades about 50 million years ago.

During the Pleistocene period dating back over two million years ago, glaciation advancing and retreating repeatedly scoured the landscape leaving deposits of rock debris. The U-shaped cross section of the river valleys is a result of recent glaciation. Uplift and faulting in combination with glaciation have been the dominant processes which have created the tall peaks and deep valleys of the North Cascades area.

== Gallery ==
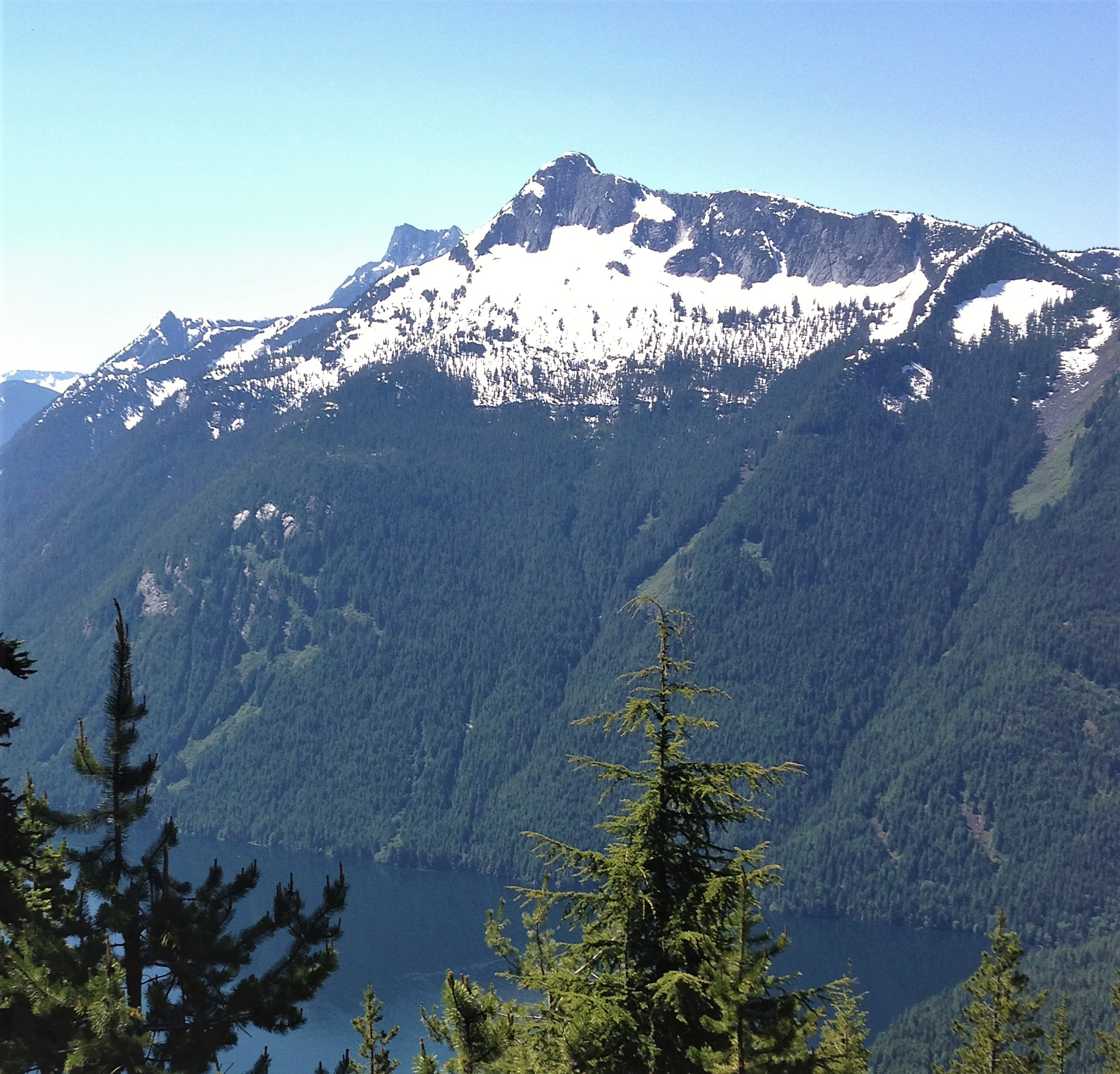
North aspect of Mount Webb seen from Flora Peak

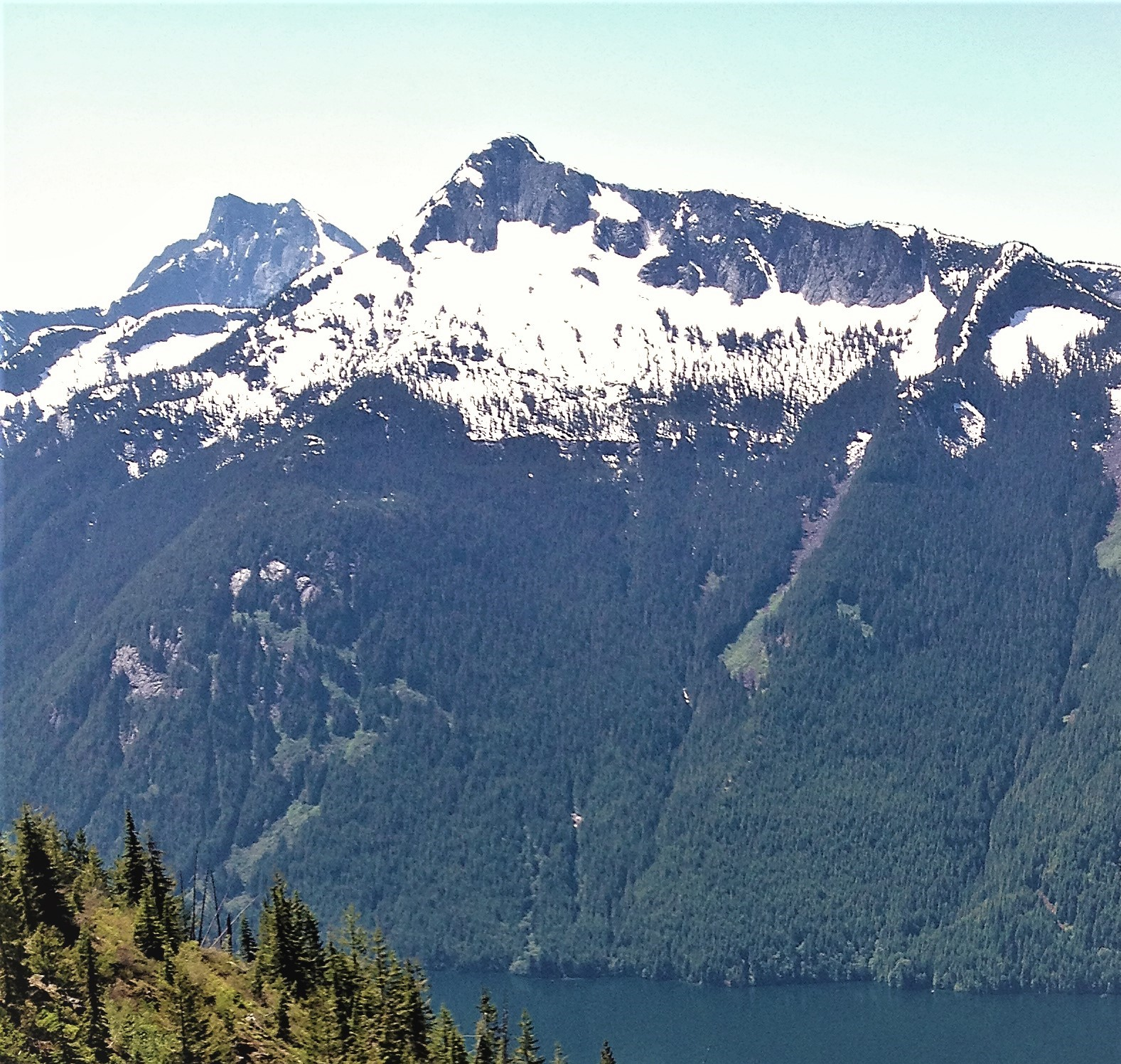
North aspect of Mount Webb seen from Flora Peak.
(Mount Lindeman behind to the left.)

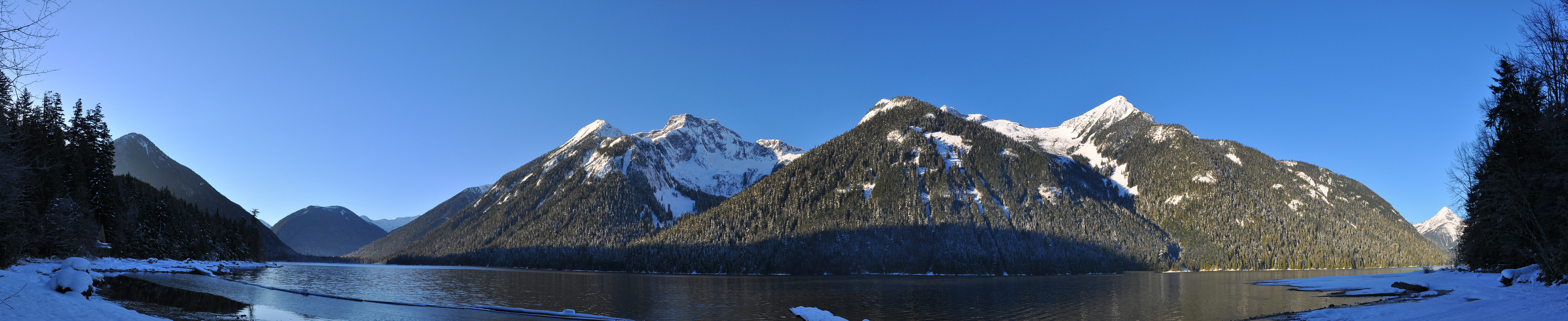
Mount Lindeman (left) and Mt. Webb (right) from Chilliwack lake

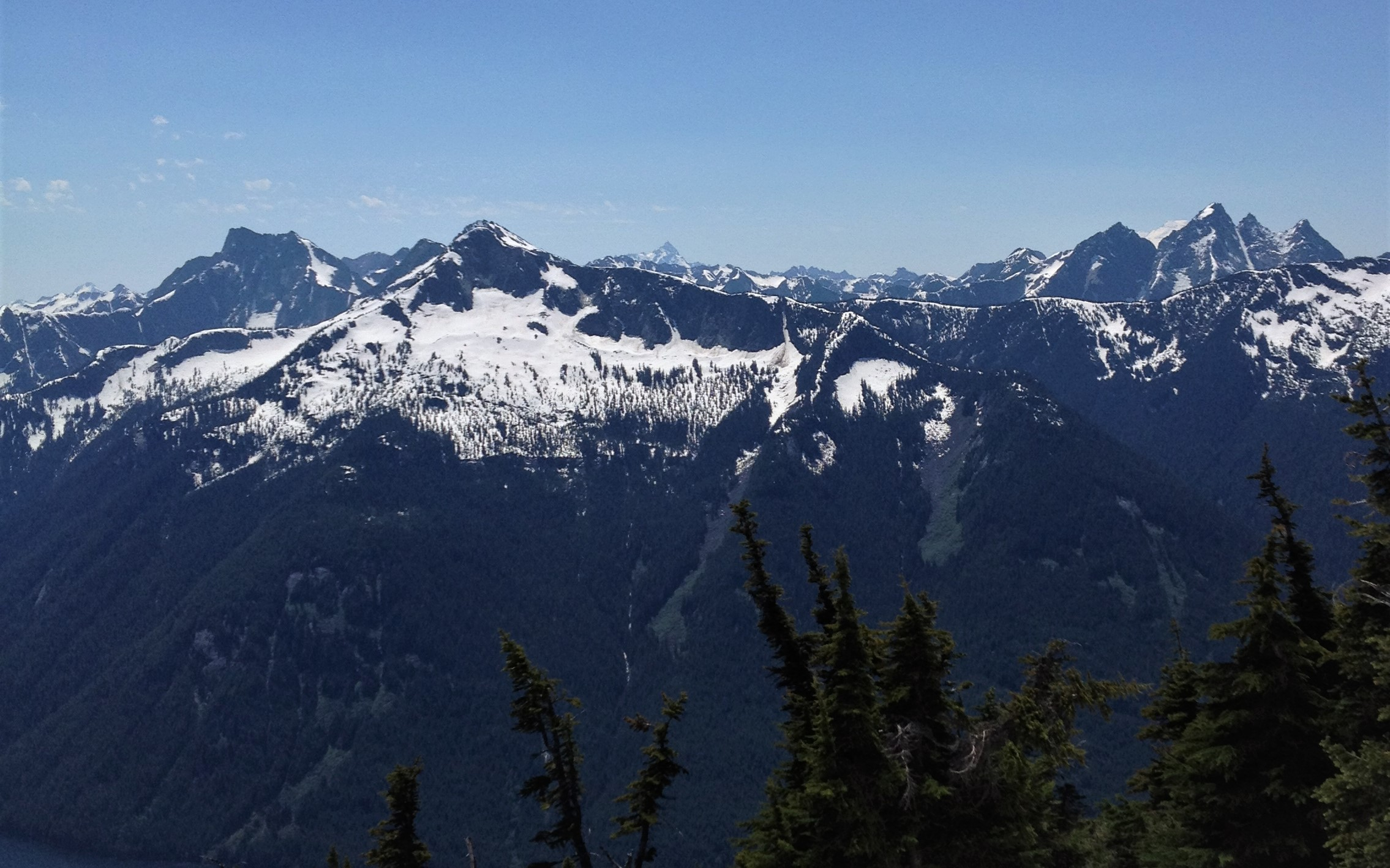
Mt. Lindeman, Mt. Webb, Mt. Rexford seen from Flora Peak.

== See also ==
- Geography of the North Cascades
