= Redoubt Glacier =

Glacier in the state of Washington

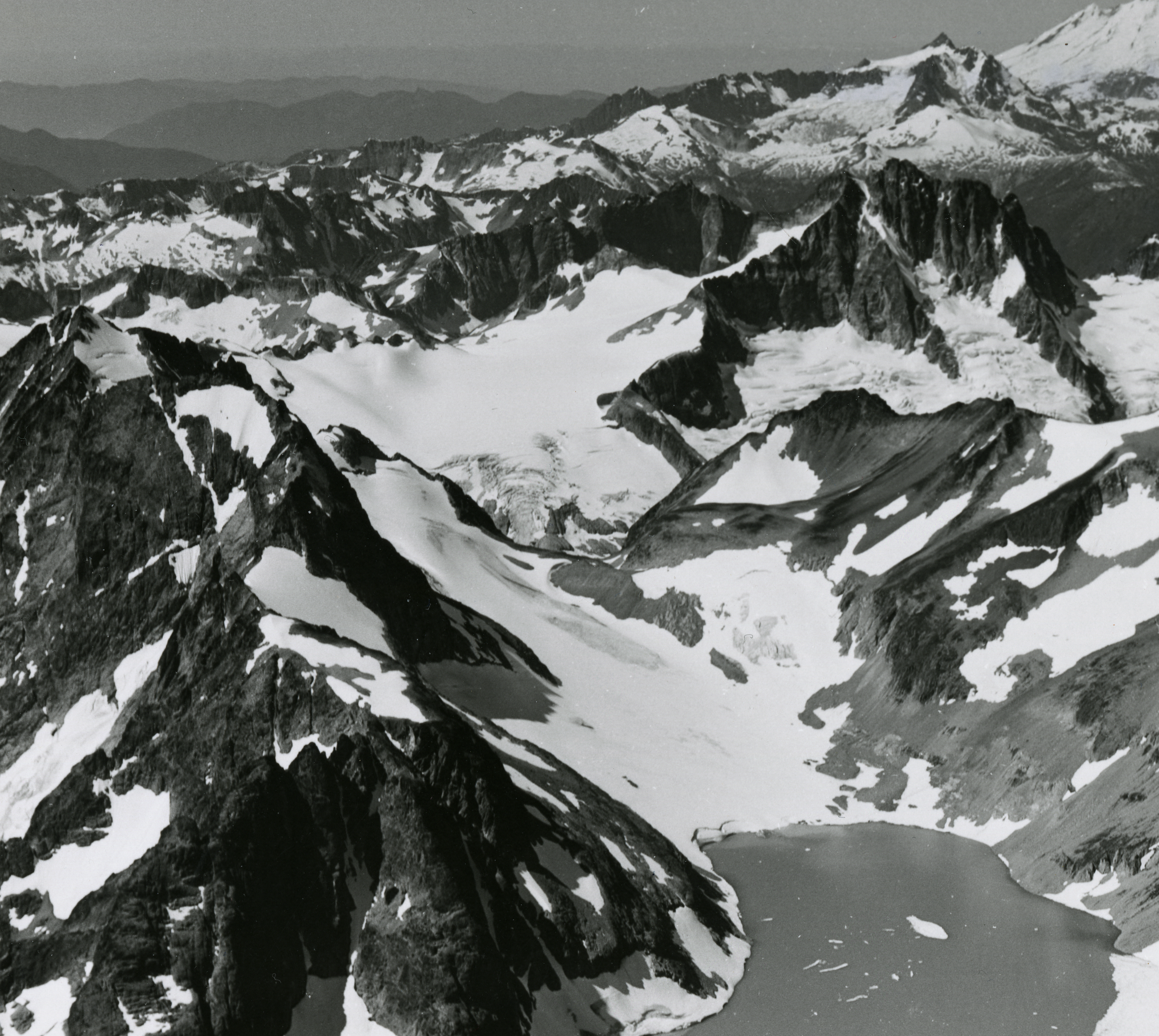
- Redoubt Glacier (upper center) on the shoulder of Mount Redoubt (upper right)

- Location within Washington (state)
- Type: Mountain glacier
- Location: Whatcom County, Washington, U.S.
- Coordinates: 48°57′18″N 121°16′34″W
- Length: 1.5 mi (2.4 km)
- Terminus: Barren rock and icefall
- Status: Retreating

Redoubt Glacier is in North Cascades National Park in the U.S. state of Washington, on the east slopes of Mount Redoubt. Redoubt Glacier descends from the 8,400-foot (2,600 m) point on the east slope of Mount Redoubt then has a south terminus near 7,200 ft (2,200 m). The glacier then has a shallow gradient for most of its course before descending north on a wide 1.5 mi (2.4 km) front to 6,500 ft (2,000 m). Melt from the glacier feeds into Depot Creek which flows into Chilliwack Lake. The Depot Glacier lies to the west of Redoubt Glacier.

== See also ==
- List of glaciers in the United States
