= Lindeman Lake (Chilliwack) =

Lake in British Columbia, Canada

Coordinates: 49°6′51.7″N 121°27′27.95″W

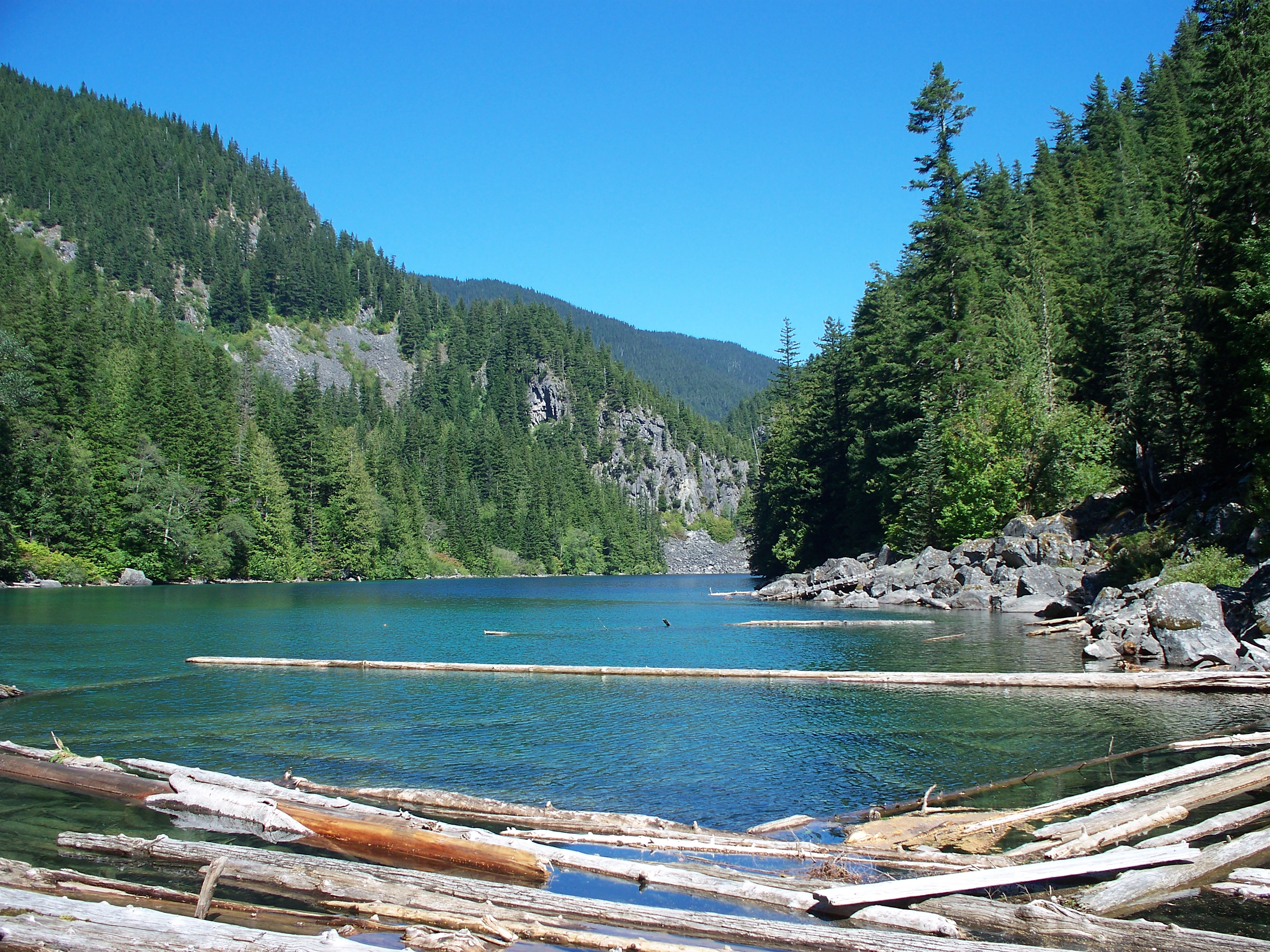
- (August 2008)

- Location within British Columbia
- Location: British Columbia, Canada
- Primary outflows: Post Creek
- Average depth: 8 m (26 ft)
- Max. depth: 20 m (66 ft)
- Surface elevation: 838 m (2,749 ft)

Lindeman Lake is a small lake in Chilliwack Lake Provincial Park, British Columbia, Canada. Located at the end of a 3.4 km trail, it is a popular hiking destination. A variety of fish inhabit this lake, including brook trout, cutthroat trout, rainbow trout, steelhead. Lindeman lake can be found by driving 40.5 km from Vedder Crossing along Chilliwack Lake road. Lindeman lake trail can be found on the left hand side of the road prior to Chilliwack Lake Provincial Park.

== See also ==
- List of lakes of British Columbia
