= Nodoubt Peak =

Mountain in Washington (state), United States

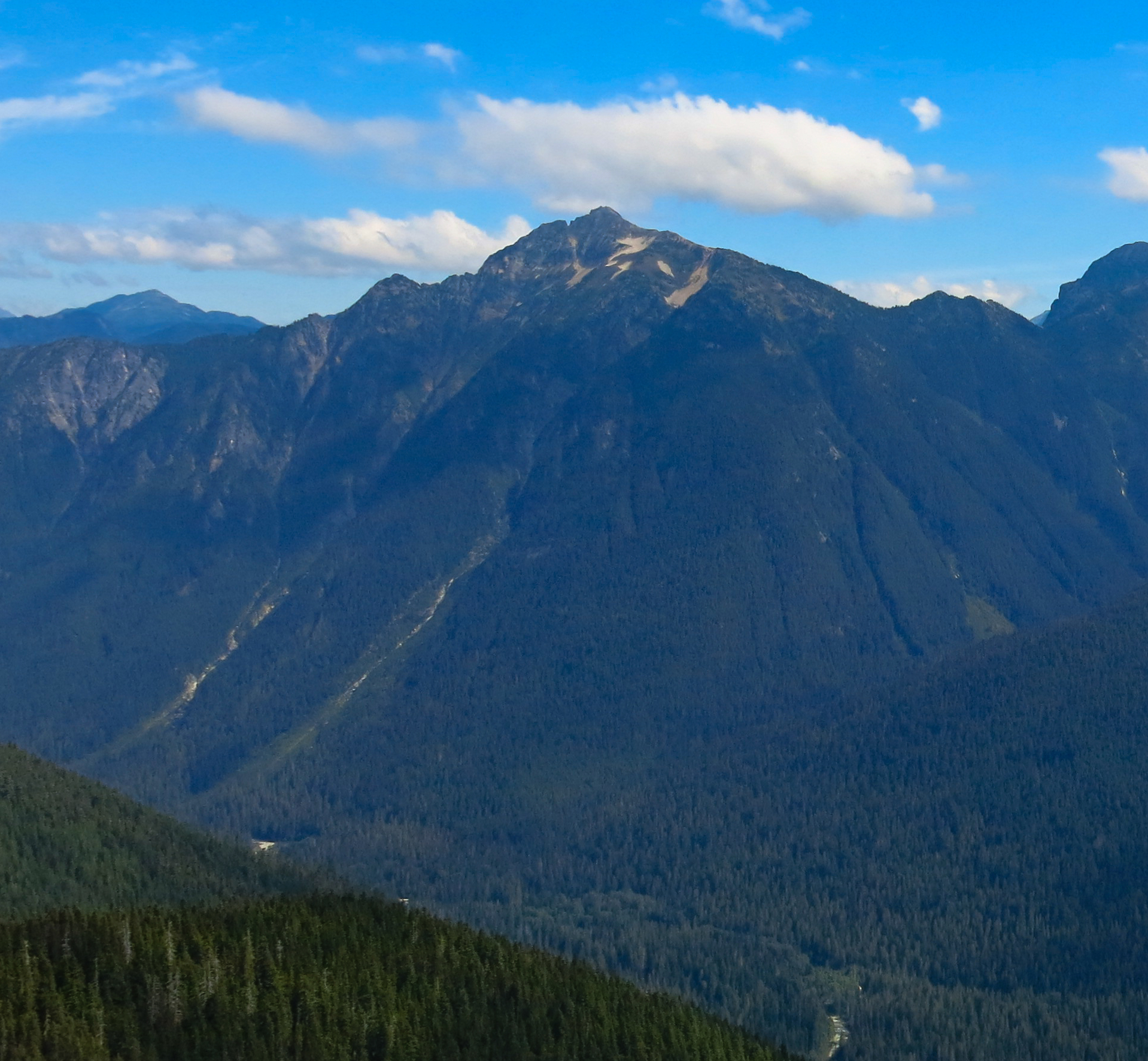
- Nodoubt Peak seen from Copper Ridge

Highest point
- Elevation: 7,290 ft (2,220 m)
- Prominence: 1,250 ft (380 m)
- Isolation: 1.43 mi (2.30 km)
- Coordinates: 48°58′54″N 121°21′22″W

Geography
- Location within Washington (state) Location within the United States
- Interactive map of Nodoubt Peak
- Country: United States
- State: Washington
- County: Whatcom
- Protected area: North Cascades National Park
- Parent range: Skagit Range; North Cascades; Cascade Range
- Topo map: USGS Mount Redoubt

Geology
- Rock age: 26 to 29 million years
- Rock type(s): Skagit gneiss and granodiorite

Climbing
- First ascent: 1859 by Francis Herbst

Nodoubt Peak is a remote 7,290-foot (2,220-metre) mountain summit in the Skagit Range of the North Cascades of Washington state. Nodoubt Peak is situated in North Cascades National Park, 2.2 kilometres south of the Canada–United States border. The nearest higher peak is Canuck Peak, 1.43 mi (2.30 km) to the southeast, and Mount Redoubt rises 3.04 mi (4.89 km) also to the southeast of Nodoubt. Nodoubt Peak was named by a group of geologists who climbed the peak in 1967. The toponym is a word play on Mount Redoubt's name. Precipitation runoff from Nodoubt Peak drains into tributaries of the Chilliwack River.

== Climate ==
Nodoubt Peak is located in the marine west coast climate zone of western North America. Weather fronts originating in the Pacific Ocean move northeast toward the Cascade Mountains. As fronts approach the North Cascades, they are forced upward by the peaks of the Cascade Range (orographic lift), causing them to drop their moisture in the form of rain or snowfall onto the Cascades. As a result, the west side of the North Cascades experiences high precipitation, especially during the winter months in the form of snowfall. Because of maritime influence, snow tends to be wet and heavy, resulting in high avalanche danger. During winter months, weather is usually cloudy, but, due to high pressure systems over the Pacific Ocean that intensify during summer months, there is often little or no cloud cover during the summer.

== Geology ==
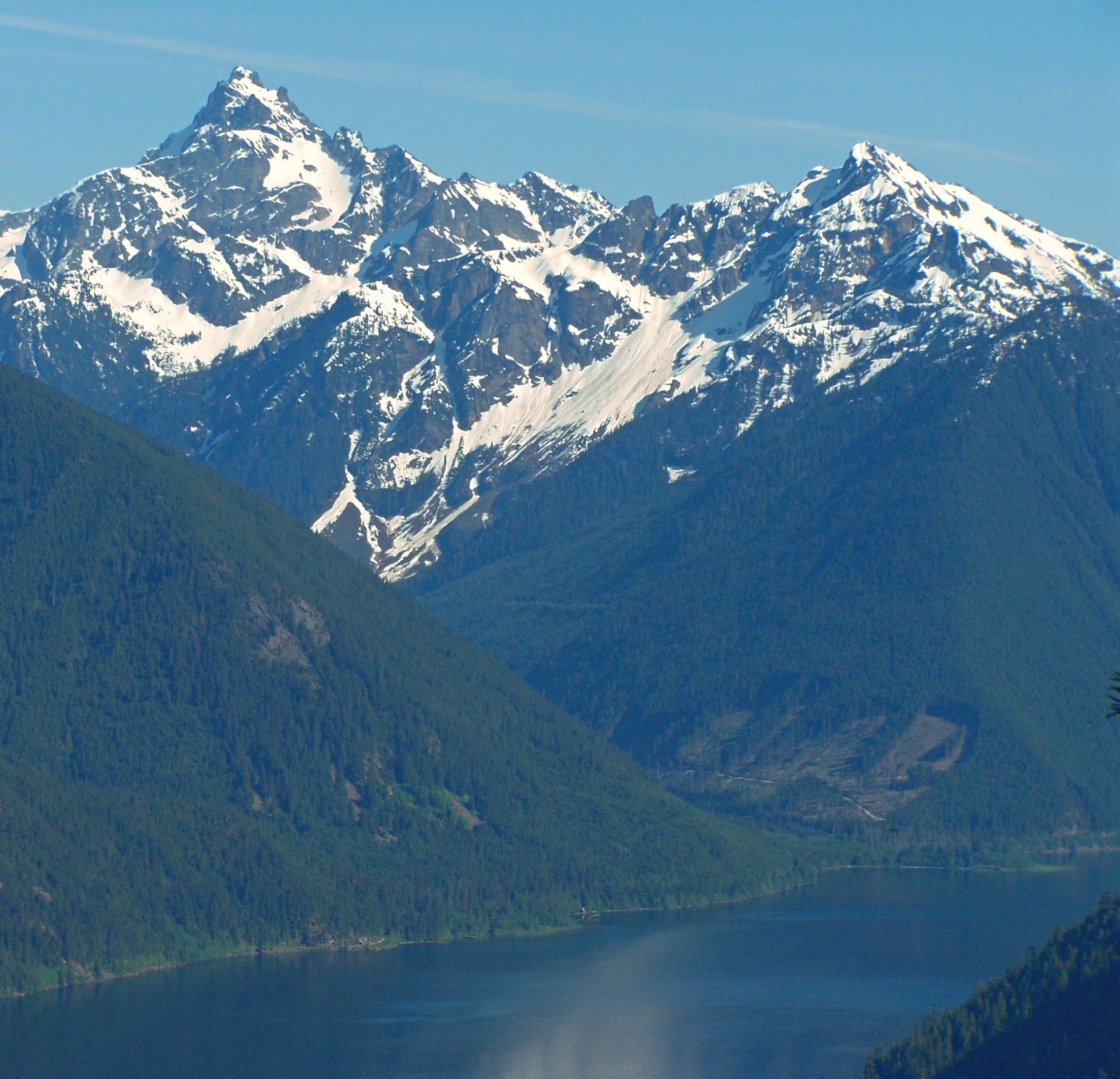
Mt. Redoubt (left) and Nodoubt (right) beyond Chilliwack Lake

The North Cascades features some of the most rugged topography in the Cascade Range with craggy peaks, ridges, and deep glacial valleys. Geological events occurring many years ago created the diverse topography and drastic elevation changes over the Cascade Range leading to various climate differences.

The history of the formation of the Cascade Mountains dates back millions of years ago to the late Eocene Epoch. With the North American Plate overriding the Pacific Plate, episodes of volcanic igneous activity persisted. In addition, small fragments of the oceanic and continental lithosphere called terranes created the North Cascades about 50 million years ago.

During the Pleistocene period dating back over two million years ago, glaciation advancing and retreating repeatedly scoured and shaped the landscape. The U-shaped cross section of the river valleys is a result of recent glaciation. Uplift and faulting in combination with glaciation have been the dominant processes which have created the tall peaks and deep valleys of the North Cascades area.

== See also ==
- Geography of the North Cascades
