= Depot Creek Falls =

Waterfall in Washington (state), United States

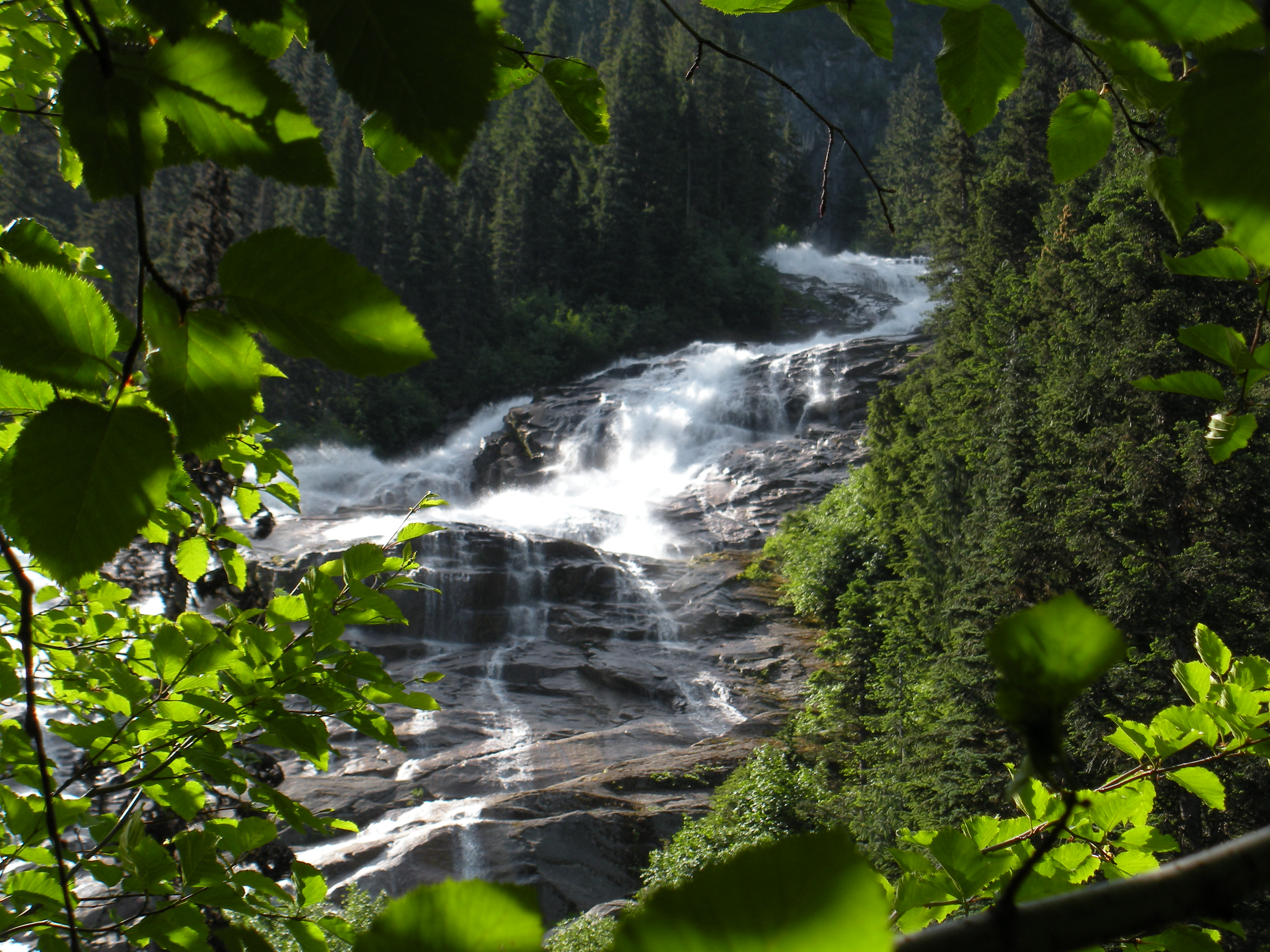

- Location within Washington (state)
- Location: Whatcom County, Washington, U.S.
- Coordinates: 48°58′40″N 121°17′05″W
- Type: Cascade
- Total height: 967 feet (295 m)
- Number of drops: 1
- Total width: 125 feet (38 m)
- Watercourse: Depot Creek

Depot Creek Falls is a 967-foot (295 m)-high waterfall in the North Cascades National Park, Whatcom County, Washington.

The falls occur where Depot Creek drops over a headwall. The creek starts off by plunging 200 feet (61 m). After that is a long slide of 767 feet (234 m) to the bottom of the valley. Spray at the falls' base is immense. The average volume of the falls is 300-500 cubic feet per second of water, which flows over a nearly 1,000-foot (300 m) high cliff as a 125-foot (38 m)-wide river.

Reaching the falls is challenging. One has to drive up Depot Creek FSR from the Canadian side, which is in poor condition, before hiking about 8 miles (13 km) to the falls. This is one reason the falls are seldom visited.

== Nearby waterfalls ==
- Depot Valley Falls (400 ft)
- Lake Fork Falls (400 ft)
- Spickard Falls (600 ft)
- Silver Lake Falls (2,128 ft)

== See also ==
- List of waterfalls
