= Depot Valley Falls =

Waterfall in Washington (state), United States

- Location within Washington (state)
- Location: Whatcom County, Washington, U.S.
- Coordinates: 48°58′48″N 121°16′52″W
- Type: Cascade
- Total height: 400 feet (120 m)
- Number of drops: 1

Depot Valley Falls is a 400-foot (120 m) waterfall on the Custer Fork Depot Creek that shares the same cliff as the nearby, much larger Depot Creek Falls, both in Whatcom County, Washington, United States. It is 100 feet (30 m) wide.

== Naming ==
The Custer Fork Depot Creek is an informal name for the actually unnamed stream. This name refers to the stream's source, Mount Custer.

== See also ==
- List of waterfalls
