= Greendrop Lake =

Lake in British Columbia, Canada

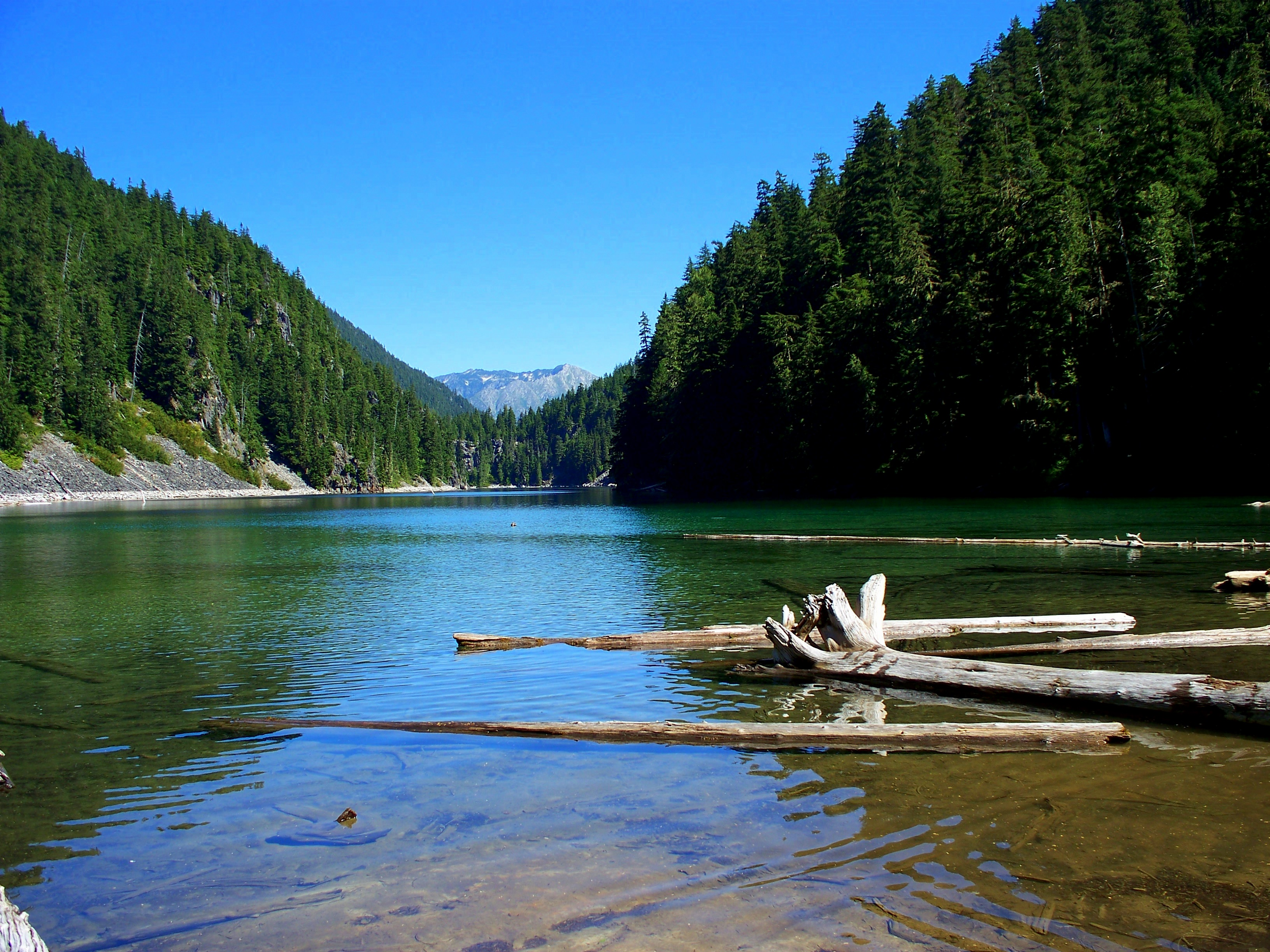
- (August 2010)

- Location within British Columbia
- Location: British Columbia, Canada
- Coordinates: 49°8′21″N 121°26′4″W
- Average depth: 18 m (59 ft)
- Max. depth: 48 m (157 ft)
- Surface elevation: 1,021 m (3,350 ft)

Greendrop Lake is a small lake in Chilliwack Lake Provincial Park, British Columbia, Canada. It can only be accessed by hiking trails, the shortest of which is 5.3 km in length.

== See also ==
- List of lakes of British Columbia
