= Hanging Lake (British Columbia–Washington) =

- Location within Washington (state) Location within British Columbia Location within the United States Location within Canada
- Location: North Cascades National Park, Whatcom County, Washington, United States; Chilliwack Lake Provincial Park, British Columbia, Canada
- Coordinates: 48°59′54″N 121°27′09″W
- Lake type: Cirque Lake
- Basin countries: United States/Canada
- Max. length: .50 mi (0.80 km)
- Max. width: .35 mi (0.56 km)
- Surface elevation: 4,524 ft (1,379 m)

Hanging Lake straddles the international border between the United States and Canada. Most of the lake is located in North Cascades National Park, Washington, but the northern section of the lake as well as the drainage are in Chilliwack Lake Provincial Park, British Columbia. Hanging Lake is less than 1 mi (1.6 km) ENE of Middle Peak.
