= Mount Spickard =

Mountain in Washington state, USA

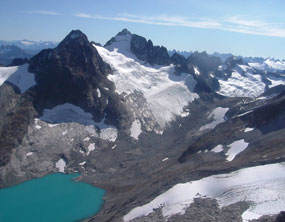
- Mount Spickard with Silver Glacier and Silver Lake

Highest point
- Elevation: 8,980 ft (2,737 m) NAVD 88
- Prominence: 4,779 ft (1,457 m)
- Coordinates: 48°58′11″N 121°14′26″W

Geography
- Location within Washington (state)
- Interactive map of Mount Spickard
- Location: North Cascades National Park, Whatcom County, Washington, U.S.
- Parent range: North Cascades, Skagit Range

Geology
- Rock age: Tertiary

Climbing
- First ascent: 1904 by Walter Raeburn

Mount Spickard (pronounced SPICK' erd) is a 8,980-foot (2,740 m) mountain peak in the North Cascades, a mountain range in the U.S. state of Washington. Located 2 miles (3.2 km) south of the Canada–US border, it is part of the Chilliwack Group, a subrange of the Skagit Range which is part of the North Cascades. It is composed mainly of gneiss and is part of two major drainage basins: that of the Skagit River and Fraser River.

With a topographic prominence of over 4,700 feet (1,400 m), Mount Spickard is one of the most prominent peaks in the state, and has two minor summits. It was named for Dr. Warren J. Spickard Jr., a climber who fell to his death while ascending another nearby mountain peak. The first to ascend it was Walter B. Reaburn, in 1904.

== Description ==
Mount Spickard rises to 8,980 feet (2,740 m) in the northernmost extreme of North Cascades National Park, making it the 5th highest peak in the park and the 16th highest in the state. Its prominence of 4,779 feet (1,457 m) is the ninth-greatest in the state and makes it the 70th-most prominent peak in the United States. It is located 19 miles (31 km) northwest of Jack Mountain, the nearest higher peak.

The main summit of Spickard has two sub-peaks. The taller of the two is a 8,824-foot (2,690 m) summit, with a prominence of 304 feet (93 m), 0.3 miles (0.48 km) to the northeast of the true summit. The shorter is located 0.5 miles (0.80 km) southwest of the main peak and rises to 8,405 feet (2,562 m), but has 364 feet (111 m) of prominence. In his popular climbing guide, Fred Beckey uses the name "Peak 8824" for the northeast sub-peak.

High ridges connect Mount Spickard to other peaks. A ridge to the southwest connects Spickard with Twin Spires (also called Mox Peaks) and the Ridge of Gendarmes. The high ridges to the southeast of Mount Spickard are somewhat broken up by glacier-couloirs but connect Spickard with summits known as Tombstone Peak and Peak 7153. Another high ridge extends to the northeast. The ridge to the northwest is broken by a saddle point but otherwise extends several miles, curving north and east, around Silver Lake to Mount Custer Ridge, Mount Rahm, and Devils Tongue.

== Hydrology ==
There are many glaciers on Mount Spickard's slopes and neighboring ridges. Silver Glacier extends over a mile from Spickard's summit north through a large cirque to Silver Lake. The high terrain southwest of Mount Spickard is intensely glaciated, with numerous glaciers, some very large, extending over 3 mi (4.8 km) to Mount Redoubt.

There are four main drainage basins reaching to the slopes of Mount Spickard. Depot Creek flows west and northwest to join the Chilliwack River and, ultimately, the Fraser River, which flows into the Pacific Ocean in British Columbia. On the south side of Spickard are some headstreams of Perry Creek, which flows east to Little Beaver Creek and, via Ross Lake, the Skagit River. To the north Silver Lake Glacier sends meltwater into Silver Lake. Meltwater streams from glaciers on the east side of Mount Spickard join the outflow, Silver Creek, which flows east from Silver Lake to Ross Lake.

Access to the mountain is difficult due to the remote and rugged nature of the area. The easiest approach is from British Columbia via Chilliwack Lake and Depot Creek. There are two common approaches within Washington, both via water taxi on Ross Lake.

== History ==
The geologist Reginald A. Daly studied the Spickard area in 1902 and 1906. He described Mount Spickard (then called Glacier Peak) and its neighbors as the most inaccessible summits of the entire U.S.–Canada border region west of the Flathead River of the Rocky Mountains. The first ascent was made in 1904 by Walter B. Reaburn. A second ascent was made the following year by Thomas Riggs Jr., George Neuner Jr., and J. Beall. In 1906, Noel J. Ogilvie and a Canadian party climbed Mount Spickard.

Mount Spickard was called Glacier Peak until 1963, when it was renamed in memory of Warren Spickard. Spickard was a distinguished mountaineer, who died in 1961 while climbing the nearby Northwest Twin Spires (also called Northwest Mox Peak or Northwest Mox). He had climbed Mount Spickard in 1955.

== See also ==
- Mount Redoubt
- Stephen Mather Wilderness
- List of highest mountain peaks in Washington
