= Mount Rexford =

Mountain in British Columbia, Canada

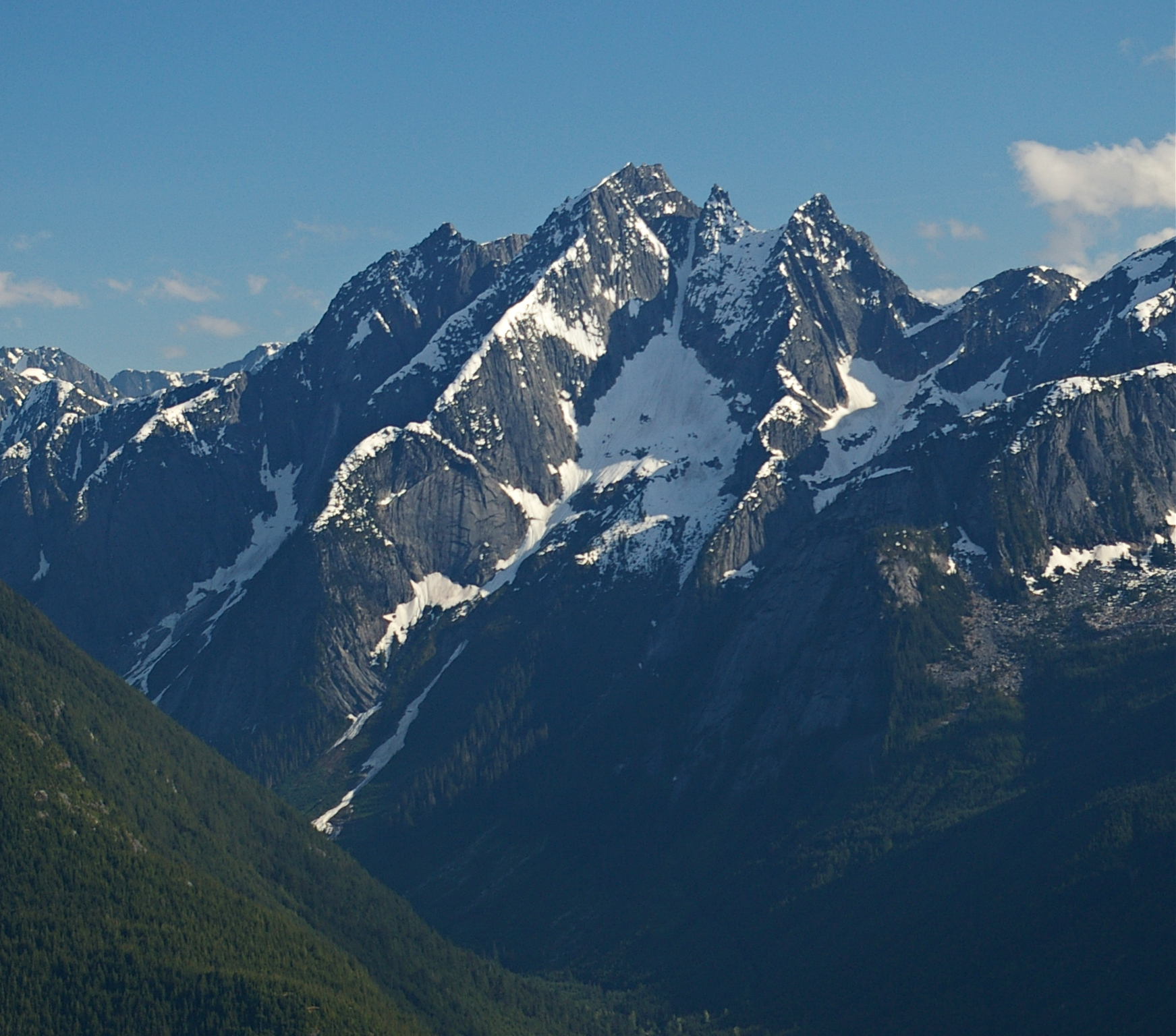
- Mount Rexford, north aspect

Highest point
- Elevation: 2,329 m (7,641 ft)
- Prominence: 555 m (1,821 ft)
- Parent peak: Slesse Mountain (2429 m)
- Isolation: 5.34 km (3.32 mi)
- Listing: Mountains of British Columbia
- Coordinates: 49°02′00″N 121°31′27″W

Geography
- Location within British Columbia Location within Canada
- Interactive map of Mount Rexford
- Location: British Columbia, Canada
- District: Yale Division Yale Land District
- Parent range: Skagit Range; North Cascades
- Topo map: NTS 92H4 Chilliwack

Geology
- Mountain type: Intrusive
- Rock type: Granodiorite
- Volcanic belt: Pemberton Volcanic Belt

Climbing
- First ascent: 1951 by Herman Genschorek and Walt Sparling
- Easiest route: Scramble

Mount Rexford is a prominent 2,329-metre (7,641-foot) mountain summit located in the Cascade Mountains of southwestern British Columbia, Canada. It is situated 3.5 km (2 mi) north of the Canada–United States border, 7 km (4 mi) west of Chilliwack Lake, and 5.5 km (3 mi) east of Slesse Mountain, which is its nearest higher neighbor. Precipitation runoff from the peak drains into Nesakwatch and Centre Creeks, both tributaries of the Chilliwack River. Originally known as Ensawkwatch, the mountain was named for an early settler in the area, Rexford, who had a cabin near Slesse Creek and had trap lines in the vicinity. The mountain has two subsidiary peaks known as the Nesakwatch Spires. The mountain's name was officially adopted on June 2, 1950, by the Geographical Names Board of Canada. Mount Rexford was first climbed in July 1951 by Herman Genschorek and Walt Sparling via the South Face. The popular West Ridge was first climbed by Gordon Dunham, Peter Thompson, and Bob and Glenn Woodsworth; Sept 16, 1962.

== Geology ==
Mount Rexford is composed of granitic rock related to the Chilliwack batholith, which intruded the region 26 to 29 million years ago after the major orogenic episodes in the region. This is part of the Pemberton Volcanic Belt, an eroded volcanic belt that formed as a result of subduction of the Farallon Plate starting 29 million years ago.

During the Pleistocene period dating back over two million years ago, glaciation advancing and retreating repeatedly scoured the landscape leaving deposits of rock debris. The U-shaped cross section of the river valleys is a result of recent glaciation. Uplift and faulting in combination with glaciation have been the dominant processes which have created the tall peaks and deep valleys of the North Cascades area.

The North Cascades features some of the most rugged topography in the Cascade Range with craggy peaks and ridges, deep glacial valleys, and granite spires. Geological events occurring many years ago created the diverse topography and drastic elevation changes over the Cascade Range leading to various climate differences which lead to vegetation variety defining the ecoregions in this area.

== Climate ==
Based on the Köppen climate classification, Mount Rexford is located in the marine west coast climate zone of western North America. Most weather fronts originate in the Pacific Ocean, and travel east toward the Cascade Range where they are forced upward by the range (Orographic lift), causing them to drop their moisture in the form of rain or snowfall. As a result, the Cascade Mountains experience high precipitation, especially during the winter months in the form of snowfall. Winter temperatures can drop below −20 °C with wind chill factors below −30 °C. The months July through September offer the most favorable weather for climbing Rexford.

== Climbing Routes ==
Established rock climbing routes on Mount Rexford:

- West Ridge - class 4 First Ascent 1962
- Northeast Ridge - class 5 FA 1969
- The Priest-Coupe (NE couloir) - class 5 FA 1970
- East Ridge - class 5.7 FA 1973
- South Ridge - class 4 FA 1981
- Southwest Flank - class 3-4 FA 1951
- Southeast Arete - class 3-4

== Gallery ==
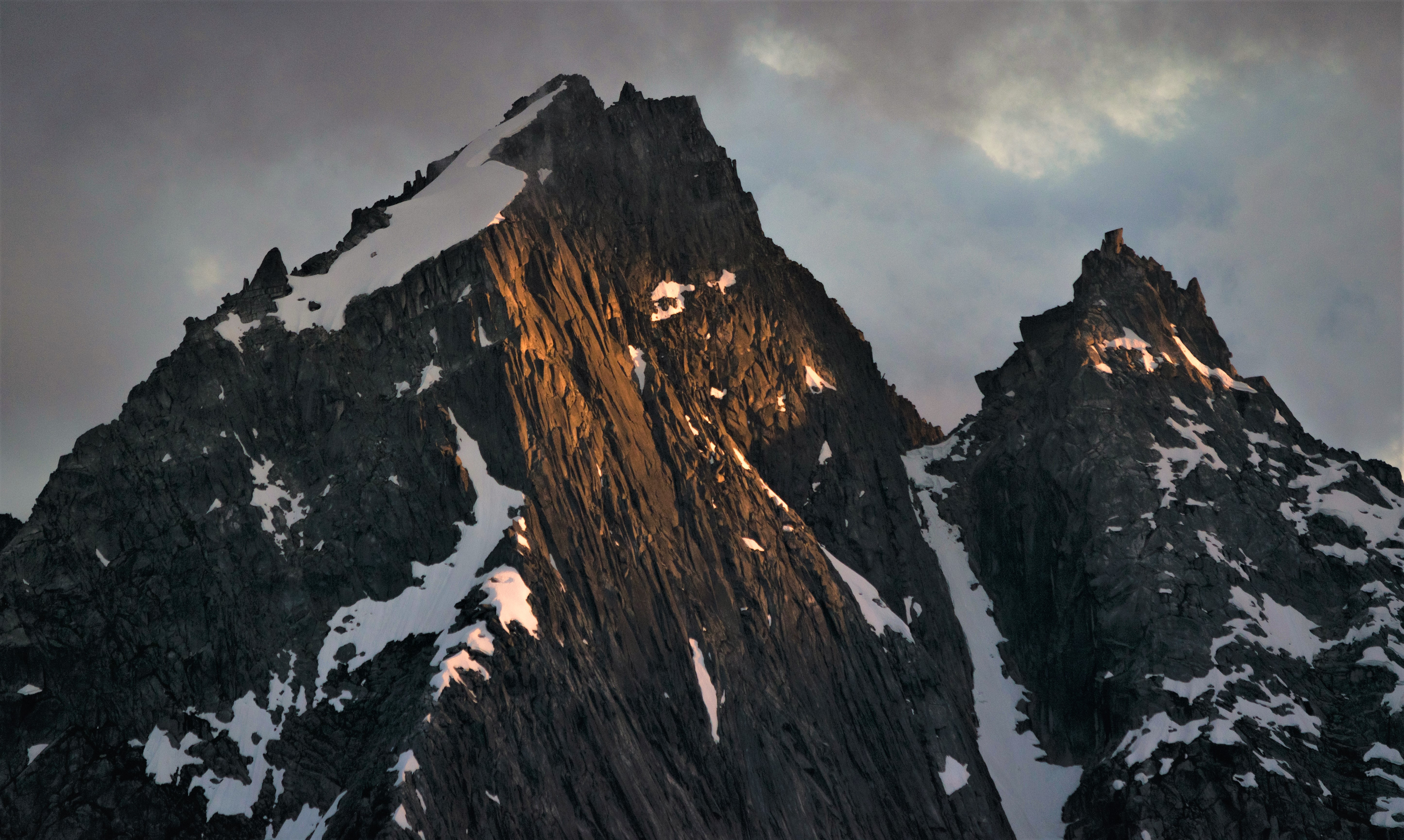
Summit detail, northeast aspect

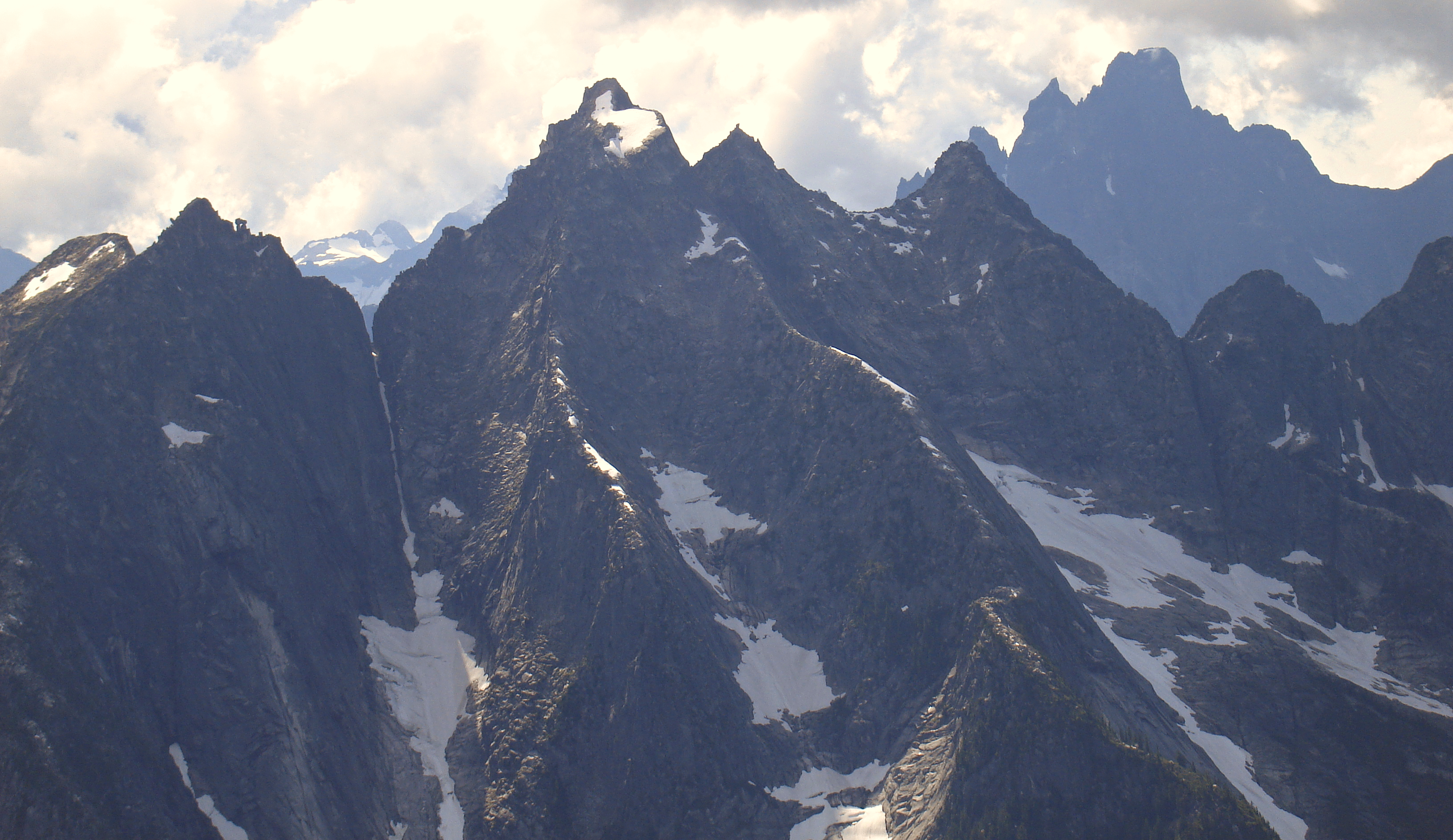
Mount Rexford with Slesse (upper right)

== See also ==
- Geography of British Columbia
- Geology of British Columbia
