= Silver Glacier =

Glacier in the state of Washington

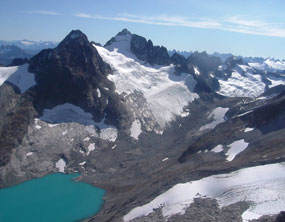
- Silver Glacier lies between the two main peaks of Mount Spickard

- Location within Washington (state)
- Type: Cirque glacier
- Location: Whatcom County, Washington, U.S.
- Coordinates: 48°58′10″N 121°14′25″W
- Length: .45 mi (0.72 km)
- Terminus: Icefall
- Status: Retreating

Silver Glacier is in North Cascades National Park in the U.S. state of Washington and descends to the northwest from near the summit of Mount Spickard. Silver Glacier descends from 8,700 to 7,200 ft (2,700 to 2,200 m), and Silver Lake lies .50 mi (0.80 km) below the current terminus of the glacier. In 1993, Silver Glacier had an area of .49 km^{2}. The National Park Service is currently studying Silver Glacier as part of their glacier monitoring project. Between 1993 (when monitoring began) and 2013 the glacier had lost ~8 m of thickness.

== See also ==
- List of glaciers in the United States
