= Depot Creek (Chilliwack River tributary) =

Stream in Canada and the United States

- Location of the mouth of Depot Creek in British Columbia

Location
- Country: Canada, United States
- Province/ State: British Columbia, Washington

Physical characteristics
- Source: Unnamed lake
  - location: Whatcom County, Washington State, United States
  - coordinates: 48°57′52″N 121°15′53″W
  - elevation: 1,725 m (5,659 ft)
- Mouth: Chilliwack Lake
  - location: British Columbia, Canada
  - coordinates: 49°01′46″N 121°24′07″W
  - elevation: 622 m (2,041 ft)

Basin features
- River system: Pacific Ocean drainage basin

Depot Creek, also known as Brown Creek and Kokanee Creek, is a large creek in south-central British Columbia, Canada and Whatcom County, Washington, United States. It is in the Pacific Ocean drainage basin, and is located in the North Cascades. A waterfall along its course, known as Depot Creek Falls, is a notable feature.

== Name origin ==
Although a book on waterfalls says it was named after an old trading post near its mouth, hence the name "Depot", the British Columbia Names Office provides an alternative explanation. It state that, since the creek is also known as Brown Creek after a US Army colonel who drowned in Chilliwack Lake in 1858 and was buried next to the creek, it was probably located near a supply depot of the Boundary Commission, which was active from 1858 to 1861. The Canadian Department of Fisheries and Oceans files on this creek, say that in addition to Brown Creek, it is also known as Kokanee Creek, for a species of land-locked sockeye common in the Pacific Northwest.

== Course ==
Depot Creek begins at an unnamed lake Whatcom County, Washington State, United States, located in a cirque between Mount Redoubt and Mount Spickard. The creek exits the lake and flows northwest into a large, swamp-like area at the top of Depot Creek Falls. The creek then drops over the falls and reaches the bottom of the valley. From here the creek flows northwest, passes into British Columbia, Canada, and reaches its mouth at Chilliwack Lake near the lake's south end. Chilliwack Lake flows via the Chilliwack River and the Fraser River to the Pacific Ocean. The portion of the creek in the United States is in North Cascades National Park; the lower creek and creek mouth in Canada are within Chilliwack Lake Provincial Park.

== See also ==
- List of rivers in Washington
- List of rivers of British Columbia
