= Mount Redoubt (Washington) =

Mountain in Washington (state), United States

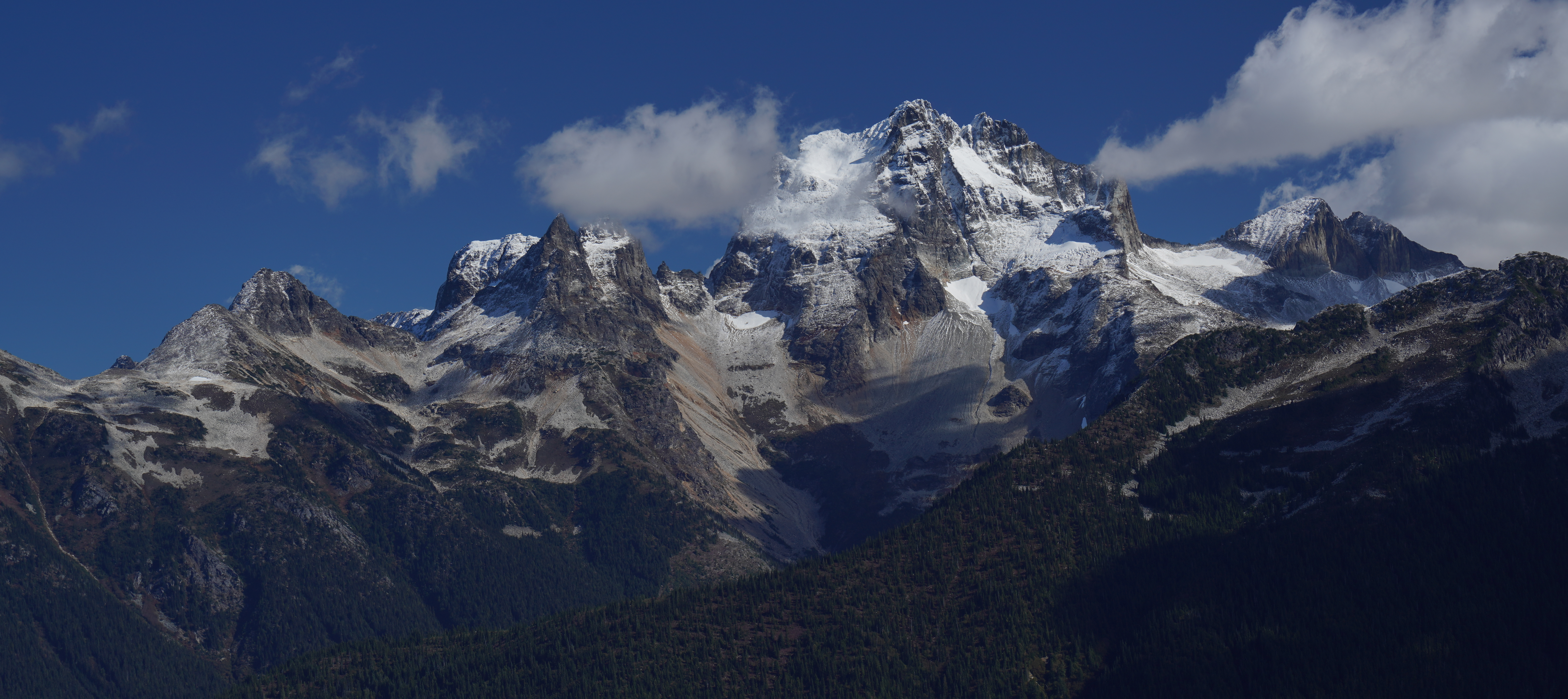
- Mount Redoubt seen from Copper Ridge

Highest point
- Elevation: 8,969 ft (2,734 m)
- Prominence: 1,649 ft (503 m)
- Coordinates: 48°57′29″N 121°18′06″W

Geography
- Location within Washington (state) Location within the United States
- Interactive map of Mount Redoubt
- Location: North Cascades National Park, Whatcom County, Washington, U.S.
- Parent range: North Cascades, Skagit Range

Geology
- Rock type: Skagit gneiss

Climbing
- First ascent: 1930 by Jimmy Cherry and Bob Ross

Mount Redoubt is a mountain in the North Cascades range in Whatcom County, Washington state. The peak is located 3.0 miles (5 km) from the Canada–US border, 16.3 miles (26 km) east-northeast of Mount Shuksan. It is the 21st highest peak in the state, with a height of 8,956 feet (2,730 m) and a prominence of 1,649 feet (503 m). Redoubt is in the Skagit Range, a sub-range of the North Cascades, in the Custer-Chilliwack Group which includes Mount Spickard, Mount Redoubt, Mount Custer and Mox Peaks, among others. Redoubt, Bear, and Depot creeks drain off the mountain, which is composed of Skagit gneiss. Mount Redoubt is listed as one of the "Classic Eight Peaks" in the North Cascades.

The mountain lies within the Stephen Mather Wilderness of North Cascades National Park, in remote terrain far from human settlement and difficult to access. It was first climbed in 1930, by Jimmy Cherry and Bob Ross. The nearest higher peak is Mount Spickard, (8,979 ft or 2,737 m), which is 2.9 miles (4.7 km) to the east-northeast. Spickard's prominence is much greater than Redoubt's. The Redoubt Glacier lies on the eastern slopes of the peak and smaller unnamed glaciers lie to the north.

There is a smaller mountain 2.9 miles (4.7 km) northwest of Mount Redoubt called Nodoubt Peak, whose name is a play on the larger mountain's name. Nodoubt Peak was named by a group of geologists who climbed the peak in 1967.

== Climate ==
Mount Redoubt is located in the marine west coast climate zone of western North America. Most weather fronts originate in the Pacific Ocean, and travel northeast toward the Cascade Mountains. As fronts approach the North Cascades, they are forced upward by the peaks of the Cascade Range, causing them to drop their moisture in the form of rain or snowfall onto the Cascades (Orographic lift). As a result, the west side of the North Cascades experiences high precipitation, especially during the winter months in the form of snowfall. During winter months, weather is usually cloudy, but, due to high pressure systems over the Pacific Ocean that intensify during summer months, there is often little or no cloud cover during the summer. Because of maritime influence, snow tends to be wet and heavy, resulting in high avalanche danger.

== Geology ==
The North Cascades features some of the most rugged topography in the Cascade Range with craggy peaks, spires, ridges, and deep glacial valleys. Geological events occurring many years ago created the diverse topography and drastic elevation changes over the Cascade Range leading to the various climate differences.

The history of the formation of the Cascade Mountains dates back millions of years ago to the late Eocene Epoch. With the North American Plate overriding the Pacific Plate, episodes of volcanic igneous activity persisted. In addition, small fragments of the oceanic and continental lithosphere called terranes created the North Cascades about 50 million years ago.

During the Pleistocene period dating back over two million years ago, glaciation advancing and retreating repeatedly scoured the landscape leaving deposits of rock debris. The U-shaped cross section of the river valleys is a result of recent glaciation. Uplift and faulting in combination with glaciation have been the dominant processes which have created the tall peaks and deep valleys of the North Cascades area.

== Gallery ==
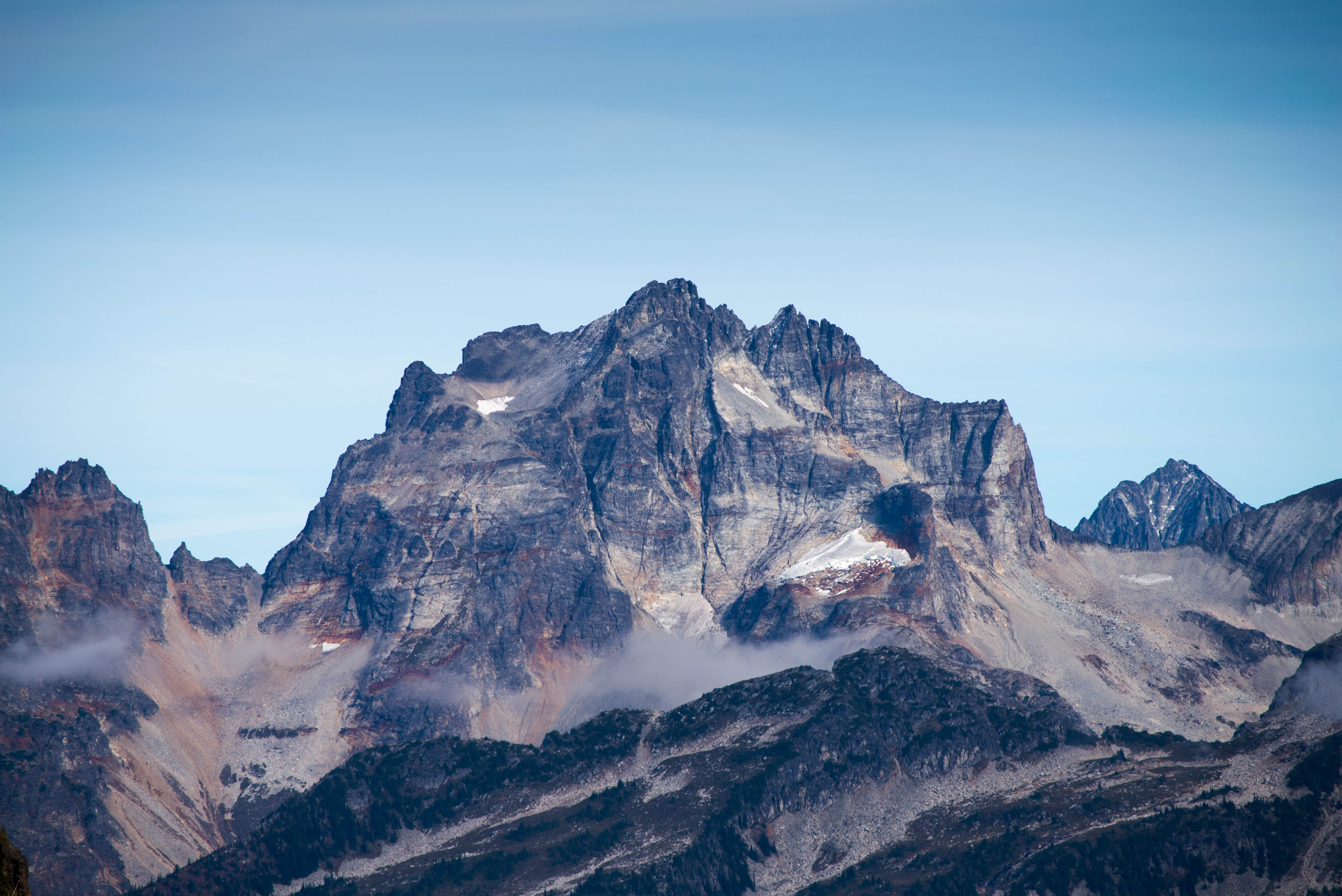
Mount Redoubt from Copper Ridge

== See also ==
- Mount Prophet
- Mount Spickard
- List of mountains by elevation
