= Sx̱ótsaqel/Chilliwack Lake Provincial Park =

Provincial park in British Columbia, Canada

- IUCN category II (national park)
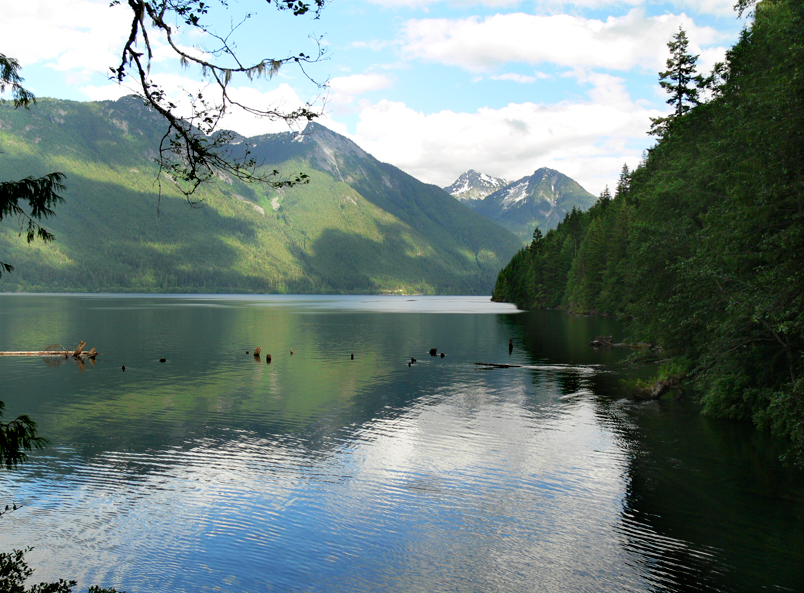
- Chilliwack Lake in the summer of 2007

- Location within British Columbia Location within Fraser Valley Regional District
- Interactive map of Sx̱ótsaqel/Chilliwack Lake Provincial Park
- Location: Fraser Valley, British Columbia, Canada
- Nearest city: Chilliwack
- Coordinates: 49°04′20″N 121°26′25″W
- Area: 9,258 hectares (22,880 acres)
- Established: July 23, 1973
- Governing body: BC Parks
- Website: bcparks.ca/sxotsaqel-chilliwack-lake-park/

Sx̱ótsaqel/Chilliwack Lake Provincial Park is a provincial park in British Columbia, Canada. Covering 92.58 km^{2}, the park is located 150 km east of Vancouver in the Chilliwack River Valley.

== History ==
A trail was first cut to the Chilliwack River in 1855 by the Hudson's Bay Company. This trail was an improvement to the “Indian Trail”, an ancient trail that joined nine Indigenous villages between Vedder Crossing and Chilliwack Lake. In the early part of the 20th century, logging began in the valley. By the 1920s the logging industry here had grown considerably. A railroad logging was set up. The railroad was destroyed by a huge fire in 1938. Subsequently, the railroad logging was stopped and supplanted by truck logging. In 1942 an army base was set up in Chilliwack and rifle ranges established on the road to Chilliwack Lake. .

Chilliwack Lake Provincial Park gets its name from the Chilliwack Lake, a valley-bottom lake. The valley is a U-shaped glacial valley. The topography of the park is a picturesque blend of old-growth forested slopes and sub-alpine and alpine ridges.

The park was first established in 1973 comprising 384 hectares. It was expanded in 1974 and again in 1997, now comprising approximately 9,258 hectares. The name of the park was changed to "Sx̱ótsaqel/Chilliwack Lake Park" in 2021. Sx̱ótsaqel means "sacred lake" in Halkomelem and the area is the ancestral homeland of the Ts’elxwéyeqw Tribe.

== Facilities and features ==
A total of 40 kilometers of trails offer hiking, bird watching and wildlife viewing opportunities for visitors. There are also plenty of activities that can be done without getting into the water. There is a large playground in the park. The park has a total of 146 frontcountry campsites. There are backcountry camps in Greendrop, Lindeman, Flora, and Radium Lakes.

Chilliwack Lake is suitable for boating, canoeing, swimming and fishing. The park also features several trails, including a trail to Lindeman Lake (1.5 km), Greendrop Lake (5.5 km), Flora Lake (7 km) and Radium Lake (6.5 km). All the hikes at the North end of the Park are considered strenuous mountain trails.

As of 2013, the park recommends avoiding Hanging Lake as the trail is unmaintained and there are no safe river crossings across the Chilliwack River.

=== Flora Lake ===
Flora Lake is one of several small lakes within the boundaries of Chilliwack Lake Provincial Park. The only access to Flora Lake is by a steep, rough and overgrown trail through slides, creeks, washouts and alpine meadows. Only experienced and well equipped hikers with path finding experience should attempt this trail. It is strongly recommended that one be prepared to spend the night, as the trip up can take several hours in both directions.

== Gallery ==
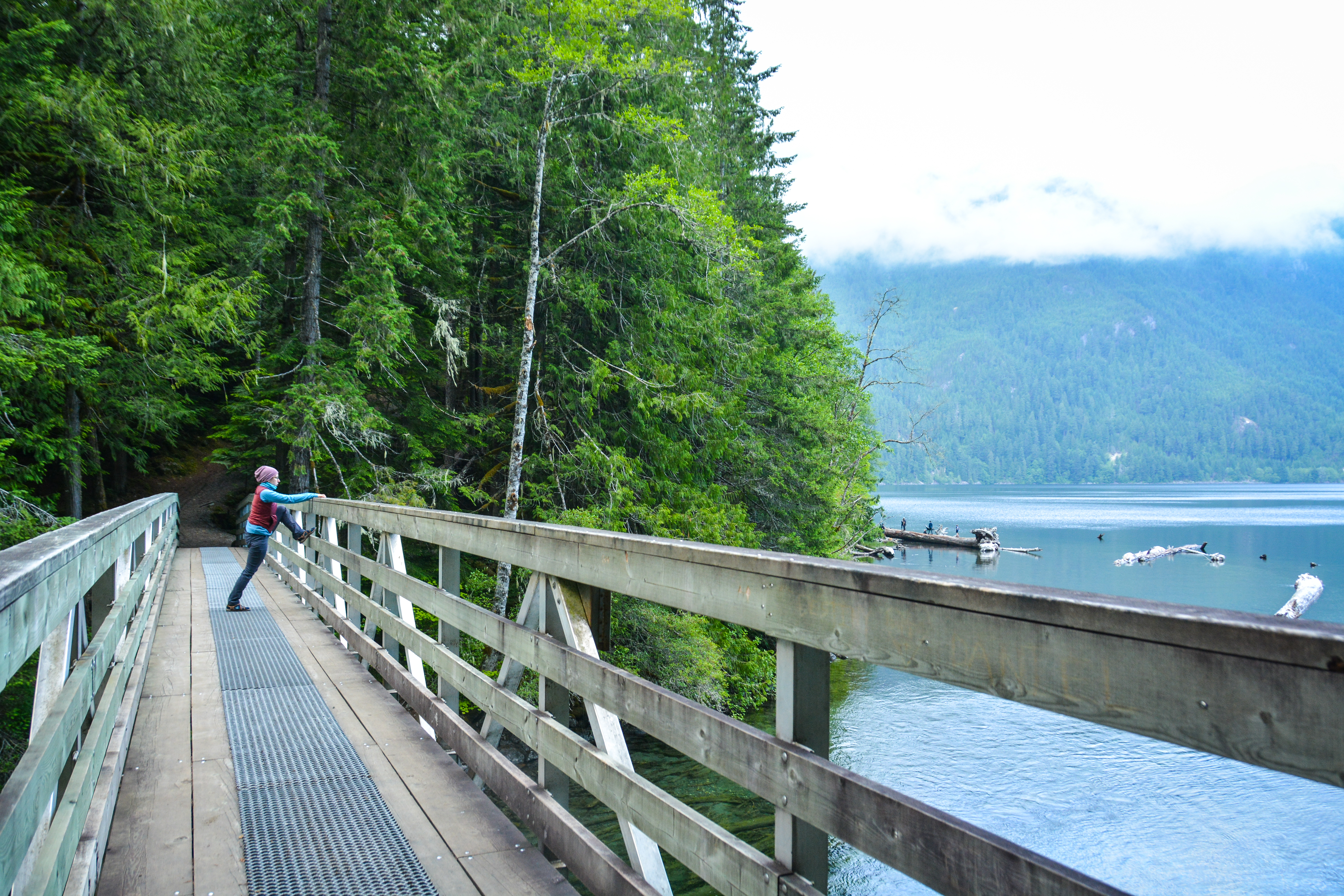
Trans Canada Trail at Chilliwack Lake

== See also ==
- Cultus Lake Provincial Park
- Skagit Valley Provincial Park
