= Chilliwack Lake =

Lake in British Columbia, Canada

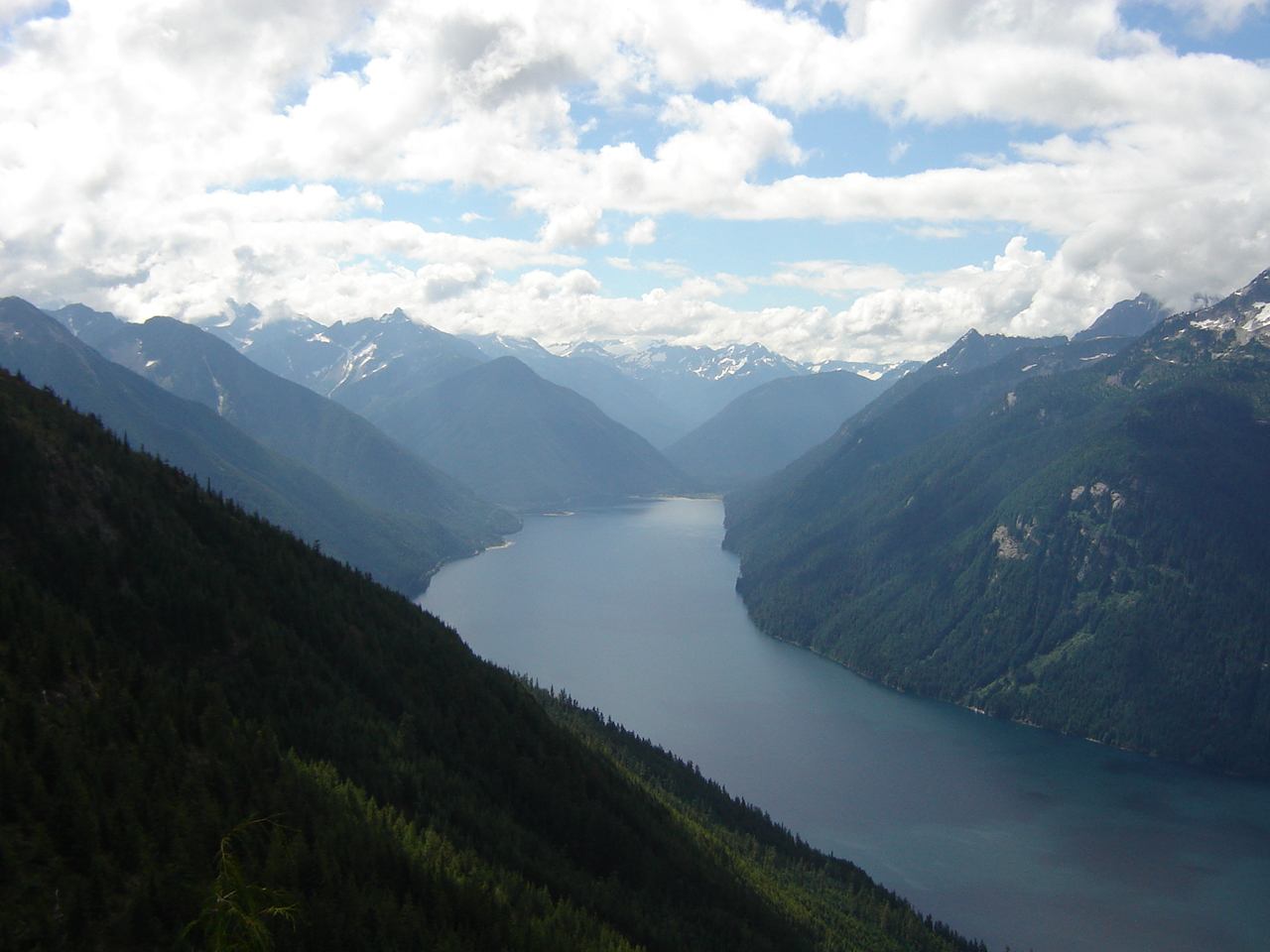
- Chilliwack Lake

- Location in British Columbia
- Location: British Columbia, Washington
- Coordinates: 49°03′25″N 121°24′50″W
- Part of: Pacific Ocean drainage basin
- Primary inflows: Chilliwack River, Paleface Creek, Depot Creek
- Primary outflows: Chilliwack River
- Basin countries: Canada, United States

Chilliwack Lake is a lake in the upper basin of the Chilliwack River southeast of the city of the same name in the Lower Mainland of British Columbia, Canada. The lake, while entirely within Canada, is located just north of the border between British Columbia and the state of Washington and is both fed and drained by the Chilliwack River, which has its source in the North Cascades of Washington state and Canada, which surround the lake on all sides.

== Parks and recreation ==
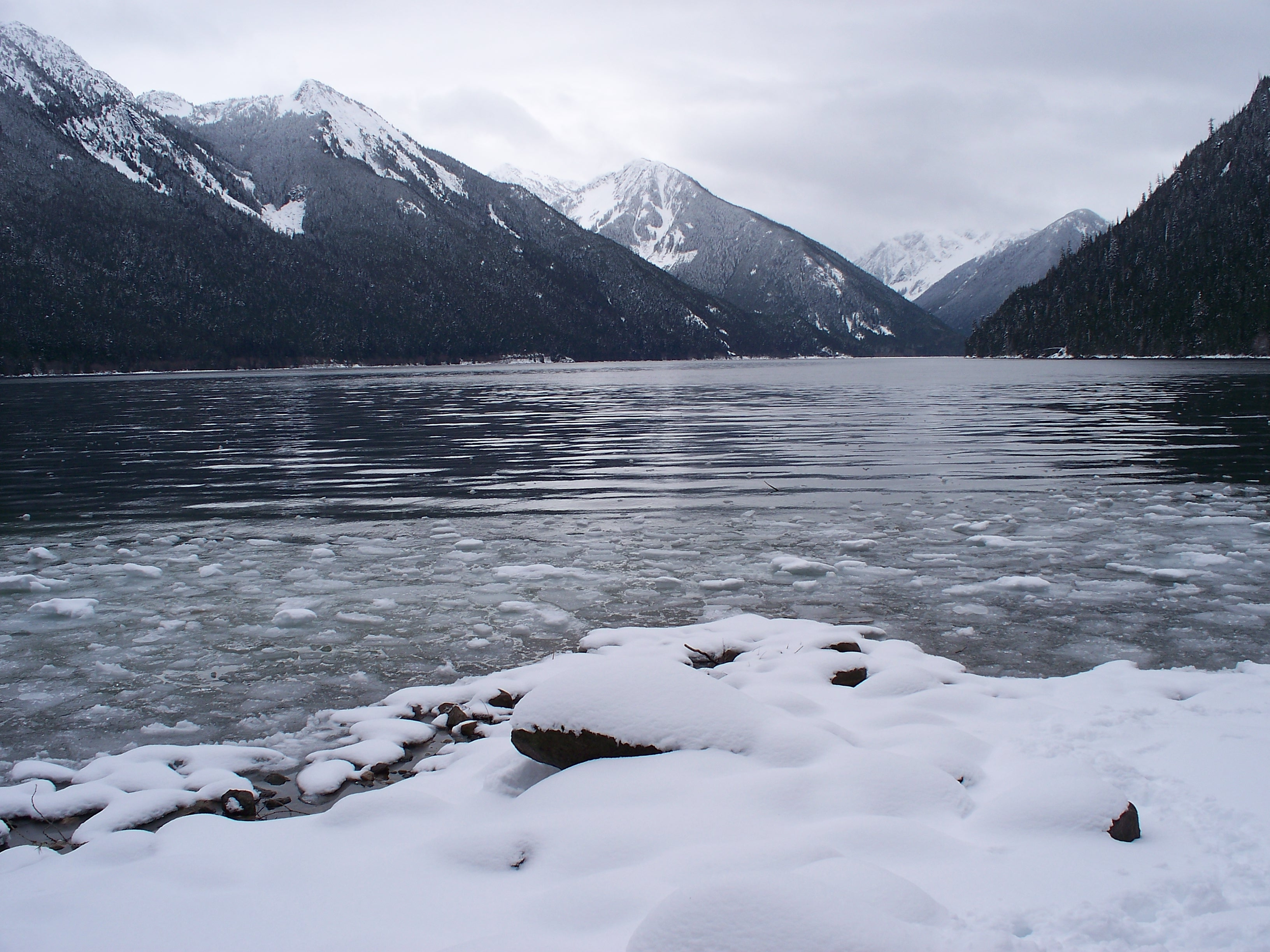
Chilliwack Lake in the winter (2009)

Chilliwack Lake Provincial Park is located on the lake's shores on the Canadian end of the lake. At the south end of the lake, there is a large beach, often a partying location, where the at-this-point-slough-like Chilliwack River enters the far end of the lake. There is also a trail that leads into an old growth forest along the river above the lake. It starts near the lake's far end. If you head off trail and ford the river, you can find the difficult trail to Hanging Lake.

=== Boating ===
Chilliwack Lake can be ideal for canoeing, kayaking, paddle-boarding and small motorized boats. It is important to understand local conditions prior to departure as strong afternoon winds can strand unsuspecting people on the east end of this alpine lake. Also note that dangerous currents exist on the north-west corner of the lake where the water flows into the Chilliwack River.

There is a boat launch that is suitable for boats under 20 feet in length at the west end of the lake. Water levels fluctuate throughout the year and the boat launch can become unusable due to either high water completely submerging it, or low water exposing jagged rocks - use at your own risk.

== Climate ==
Chilliwack Lake has an oceanic climate (Köppen climate type Cfb).

Climate data for Chilliack Lake (Chilliwack R Hatchery) (Elevation: 225m) 1981−2010
| Month | Jan | Feb | Mar | Apr | May | Jun | Jul | Aug | Sep | Oct | Nov | Dec | Year |
|---|---|---|---|---|---|---|---|---|---|---|---|---|---|
| Record high °C (°F) | 18.5 (65.3) | 19.0 (66.2) | 26.5 (79.7) | 30.5 (86.9) | 36.0 (96.8) | 33.5 (92.3) | 37.0 (98.6) | 34.0 (93.2) | 36.0 (96.8) | 27.0 (80.6) | 17.0 (62.6) | 15.0 (59.0) | 37.0 (98.6) |
| Mean daily maximum °C (°F) | 4.3 (39.7) | 7.2 (45.0) | 10.4 (50.7) | 14.0 (57.2) | 17.2 (63.0) | 19.8 (67.6) | 23.2 (73.8) | 23.5 (74.3) | 20.4 (68.7) | 13.9 (57.0) | 7.2 (45.0) | 3.7 (38.7) | 13.7 (56.7) |
| Daily mean °C (°F) | 1.8 (35.2) | 3.5 (38.3) | 6.0 (42.8) | 9.0 (48.2) | 12.0 (53.6) | 14.7 (58.5) | 17.5 (63.5) | 17.7 (63.9) | 14.6 (58.3) | 9.6 (49.3) | 4.5 (40.1) | 1.6 (34.9) | 9.4 (48.9) |
| Mean daily minimum °C (°F) | −0.7 (30.7) | −0.3 (31.5) | 1.5 (34.7) | 3.9 (39.0) | 6.8 (44.2) | 9.6 (49.3) | 11.7 (53.1) | 11.8 (53.2) | 8.8 (47.8) | 5.4 (41.7) | 1.8 (35.2) | −0.6 (30.9) | 5.0 (41.0) |
| Record low °C (°F) | −15.0 (5.0) | −17.0 (1.4) | −10.5 (13.1) | −2.0 (28.4) | −0.5 (31.1) | 2.0 (35.6) | 6.0 (42.8) | 5.5 (41.9) | 1.5 (34.7) | −7.0 (19.4) | −18.5 (−1.3) | −16.0 (3.2) | −18.5 (−1.3) |
| Average precipitation mm (inches) | 180.8 (7.12) | 127.9 (5.04) | 132.5 (5.22) | 113.0 (4.45) | 92.9 (3.66) | 89.0 (3.50) | 54.0 (2.13) | 52.8 (2.08) | 70.3 (2.77) | 162.4 (6.39) | 244.9 (9.64) | 182.5 (7.19) | 1,502.9 (59.17) |
| Average rainfall mm (inches) | 159.0 (6.26) | 113.2 (4.46) | 123.5 (4.86) | 112.2 (4.42) | 92.9 (3.66) | 88.9 (3.50) | 54.0 (2.13) | 52.8 (2.08) | 70.3 (2.77) | 162.1 (6.38) | 235.4 (9.27) | 164.3 (6.47) | 1,428.4 (56.24) |
| Average snowfall cm (inches) | 21.8 (8.6) | 14.8 (5.8) | 9.0 (3.5) | 0.8 (0.3) | 0.0 (0.0) | 0.0 (0.0) | 0.0 (0.0) | 0.0 (0.0) | 0.0 (0.0) | 0.3 (0.1) | 9.4 (3.7) | 18.3 (7.2) | 74.5 (29.3) |
| Average precipitation days (≥ 0.2 mm) | 18.9 | 15.4 | 18.9 | 17.9 | 16.8 | 14.6 | 8.8 | 8.2 | 10.7 | 17.6 | 21.0 | 18.4 | 187.1 |
| Average rainy days (≥ 0.2 mm) | 16.9 | 14 | 18.2 | 17.9 | 16.8 | 14.6 | 8.8 | 8.2 | 10.7 | 17.6 | 20.2 | 16.7 | 180.6 |
| Average snowy days (≥ 0.2 cm) | 3.9 | 2.6 | 1.4 | 0 | 0.04 | 0.0 | 0.0 | 0.0 | 0.0 | 0.12 | 1.7 | 3.6 | 13.36 |
Source: Environment Canada (normals, 1981−2010)

== Road closures ==
The road on the east side of the lake leading to its far end has been closed off to all but regular vehicles. ATVs and dirtbikes are not permitted on the road beyond the south boundary of Chilliwack Lake Provincial Park. In addition to that, the road has been decommissioned.

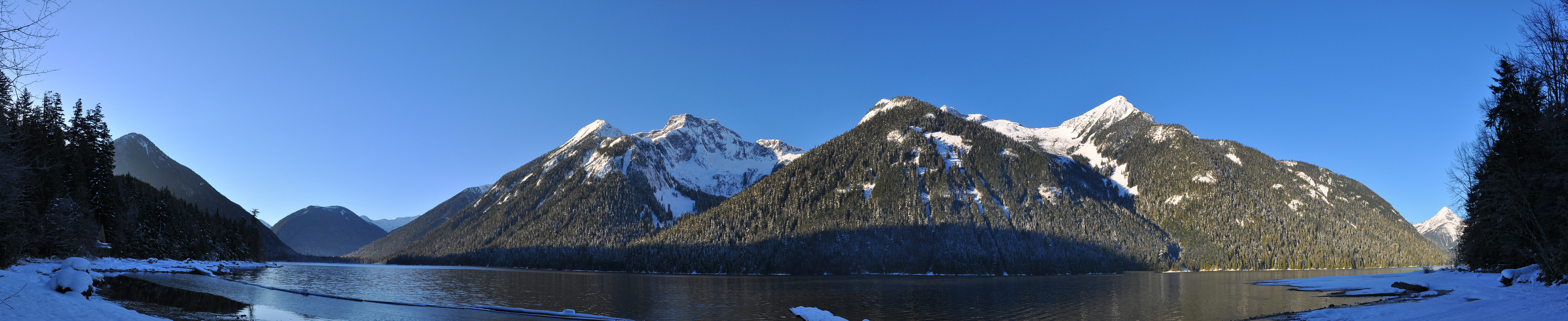
Mount Lindeman (left) and Mount Webb from east shore of Chilliwack Lake

== See also ==
- List of lakes of British Columbia
