= National Register of Historic Places listings in Chelan County, Washington =

Location of Chelan County in Washington

This is a list of the National Register of Historic Places listings in Chelan County, Washington.

This is intended to be a complete list of the properties and districts on the National Register of Historic Places in Chelan County, Washington, United States. Latitude and longitude coordinates are provided for many National Register properties and districts; these locations may be seen together in a map.

There are 48 properties and districts listed on the National Register in the county. Another property was once listed but has been removed.

This National Park Service list is complete through NPS recent listings posted October 30, 2026.

== Current listings ==
	Name on the Register	Image	Date listed	Location	City or town	Description
1	Black Warrior Mine		October 15, 1974 (#74000914)	At end of Horseshoe Basin Trail, about 20.5 miles (33.0 km) northwest of Stehekin, in North Cascades National Park; 48°28′47″N 121°01′29″W	Stehekin	
2	Blewett Arrastra	Blewett Arrastra	September 17, 1974 (#74001941)	About 11.2 miles (18.0 km) southwest of Cashmere, in Wenatchee National Forest; 47°25′21″N 120°39′34″W	Cashmere	
3	Bridge Creek Cabin-Ranger Station		February 10, 1989 (#88003458)	In Bridge Creek Campground, southwest of Stehekin Valley Trail, about 13 miles (21 km) northwest of Stehekin, in North Cascades National Park; 48°25′47″N 120°52′22″W	Stehekin	
4	Bridge Creek Shelter	Bridge Creek Shelter	February 10, 1989 (#88003445)	In Bridge Creek Campground, north of Stehekin Valley Trail, about 12.8 miles (20.6 km) northwest of Stehekin, in North Cascades National Park; 48°25′48″N 120°52′05″W	Stehekin	
5	Brown's First Addition Historic District	Brown's First Addition Historic District	March 29, 2021 (#100006343)	900 blk. of South Highland Dr. 47°24′40″N 120°18′55″W	Wenatchee	
6	Buckner Cabin	Buckner Cabin	May 17, 1974 (#74000912)	End of Rainbow Lane, about 2.6 miles (4.2 km) northwest of Stehekin, Washington, in Lake Chelan National Recreation Area; 48°20′05″N 120°42′04″W	Stehekin	Also a contributing property to Buckner Homestead Historic District.
7	Buckner Homestead Historic District	Buckner Homestead Historic District	February 10, 1989 (#88003441)	Along Rainbow Lane, about 2.6 miles (4.2 km) northwest of Stehekin, Washington, in Lake Chelan National Recreation Area; 48°20′08″N 120°42′03″W	Stehekin	Originally Address restricted, location was disclosed in 2016.
8	Burbank Homestead Waterwheel	Burbank Homestead Waterwheel	June 19, 1973 (#73002277)	In Cashmere Pioneer Village, 600 Cotlets Way, shortly south of Wenatchee bridge 47°31′13″N 120°27′25″W	Cashmere	
9	Burke-Hill Apartments	Burke-Hill Apartments	August 9, 2021 (#100006805)	119 South Okanogan Ave. 47°25′16″N 120°18′50″W	Wenatchee	
10	Chatter Creek Guard Station	Chatter Creek Guard Station	April 8, 1986 (#86000812)	Along Icicle Gorge Loop Trail, Wenatchee National Forest, about 10.5 miles (16.9 km) west of Leavenworth; 47°36′27″N 120°53′04″W	Leavenworth	
11	Chelan Butte Lookout	Chelan Butte Lookout	December 27, 1990 (#90001912)	Columbia Breaks Fire Interpretive Center, along US-97, about 1.2 miles (1.9 km) north of Entiat; 47°41′41″N 120°12′39″W	Entiat	Originally located on the summit of Chelan Butte mountain (47°48′24″N 120°02′04″W), it was removed in 1995 and relocated to Entiat in 1996.
12	Columbia River Bridge	Columbia River Bridge	July 16, 1982 (#82004198)	Spans Columbia River between Bridge Street, Wenatchee and 9th Street NE, East Wenatchee; 47°24′53″N 120°17′50″W	Wenatchee	
13	Columbia River Bridge at Wenatchee	Columbia River Bridge at Wenatchee	May 24, 1995 (#95000623)	Spans Columbia River on US-2, between Stevens Street, Wenatchee and 5th Street NE, East Wenatchee; 47°24′35″N 120°17′44″W	Wenatchee	
14	Cottage Avenue Historic District	Cottage Avenue Historic District	December 26, 2002 (#02001617)	208-509 Cottage Avenue, 103 Maple Street, 107 Parkhill Street; 47°31′15″N 120°27′47″W	Cashmere	52 contributing properties in 12.47 acres (5.05 ha), located at 208-509 Cottage Avenue, 103 Maple Street and 107 Parkhill Street.
15	Courtney Cabin	Courtney Cabin	May 31, 1974 (#74000910)	End of Company Creek Road, about 5.7 miles (9.2 km) northwest of Stehekin, Washington, in Lake Chelan National Recreation Area; 48°21′54″N 120°45′03″W	Stehekin	
16	Downtown Wenatchee Historic District	Downtown Wenatchee Historic District	December 17, 2008 (#08001200)	Roughly bounded by North and South Columbia Street, Mission Street, First Street, and Kittitas Street; 47°25′24″N 120°18′38″W	Wenatchee	
17	Flick Creek Shelter	Flick Creek Shelter	February 10, 1989 (#88003444)	East side of Lake Chelan, south of Flick Creek, about 3.2 miles (5.1 km) southeast of Stehekin, in Lake Chelan National Recreation Area; 48°16′11″N 120°37′23″W	Stehekin	
18	Golden West Lodge Historic District	Golden West Lodge Historic District	February 10, 1989 (#88003442)	End of Stehekin Valley Road, in Lake Chelan National Recreation Area; 48°18′31″N 120°39′23″W	Stehekin	
19	High Bridge Ranger Station Historic District	High Bridge Ranger Station Historic District	February 10, 1989 (#88003443)	Along Stehekin Valley Road, about 9.6 miles (15.4 km) northwest of Stehekin, in Lake Chelan National Recreation Area; 48°22′48″N 120°50′16″W	Stehekin	
20	High Bridge Shelter	High Bridge Shelter	February 10, 1989 (#88003461)	In High Bridge Campground, off Stehekin Valley Road, about 9.7 miles (15.6 km) northwest of Stehekin, in North Cascades National Park; 48°22′52″N 120°50′21″W	Stehekin	
21	Michael Horan House	Michael Horan House	March 31, 1992 (#92000281)	2 Horan Road; 47°27′34″N 120°20′05″W	Wenatchee	Demolished in 2019.
22	Lake Chelan Hydroelectric Power Plant	Lake Chelan Hydroelectric Power Plant	December 15, 1988 (#88002739)	Southwestern end of Lake Chelan to Columbia River; 47°49′36″N 120°00′11″W	Chelan	
23	Lake Wenatchee Residence No. 1200	Lake Wenatchee Residence No. 1200	March 6, 1991 (#91000158)	Along Lake Wenatchee Highway, north shore of Lake Wenatchee, about 18 miles (29 km) northwest of Leavenworth, in Wenatchee National Forest; 47°50′13″N 120°47′55″W	Leavenworth	
24	Leavenworth National Fish Hatchery	Leavenworth National Fish Hatchery	July 27, 1998 (#98000847)	12790 Fish Hatchery Road, about 2.7 miles (4.3 km) south of Leavenworth; 47°33′31″N 120°40′30″W	Leavenworth	
25	Leavenworth Ranger Station	Leavenworth Ranger Station	April 11, 1986 (#86000840)	600 Sherbourne Street; 47°35′55″N 120°39′27″W	Leavenworth	
26	Leavenworth Ski Hill Historic District	Leavenworth Ski Hill Historic District	July 17, 2013 (#13000505)	10701 Ski Hill Drive, inside the Wenatchee National Forest; 47°36′51″N 120°40′13″W	Leavenworth	
27	Richard Hinton Lord House	Richard Hinton Lord House	March 25, 1999 (#99000404)	121 East Highland Avenue; 47°50′45″N 120°01′03″W	Chelan	
28	Lucas Homestead	Lucas Homestead	December 14, 1978 (#78002734)	South of Downie Canyon Road, about 4.8 miles (7.7 km) southwest of Chelan; 47°48′13″N 120°06′21″W	Chelan	
29	Lucerne Guard Station	Lucerne Guard Station	March 6, 1991 (#91000160)	Southern shore of Lake Chelan, in Wenatchee National Forest; 48°12′08″N 120°35′25″W	Lucerne	
30	George Miller House	George Miller House	February 10, 1989 (#88003464)	Shortly east of Stehekin Valley Road, in Lake Chelan National Recreation Area; 48°18′41″N 120°39′24″W	Stehekin	
31	Penstock Bridge	Penstock Bridge	July 16, 1982 (#82004196)	Spans Wenatchee River, near the Old Pipeline Bed Trailhead, about 2.3 miles (3.7 km) west of Leavenworth, in Wenatchee National Forest; 47°35′17″N 120°42′33″W	Leavenworth	
32	Purple Point-Stehekin Ranger Station House	Purple Point-Stehekin Ranger Station House	February 10, 1989 (#88003460)	Along Stehekin Valley Road, in Lake Chelan National Recreation Area; 48°18′27″N 120°39′19″W	Stehekin	
33	Rock Island Railroad Bridge	Rock Island Railroad Bridge	July 30, 1975 (#75001842)	Spans Columbia River about 0.7 miles (1.1 km) southwest of Rock Island; 47°22′01″N 120°09′14″W	Rock Island	
34	Ruby Theatre	Ruby Theatre	October 7, 1991 (#91001495)	135 East Woodin Avenue; 47°50′25″N 120°01′03″W	Chelan	
35	St. Andrews Episcopal Church	St. Andrews Episcopal Church	March 31, 1992 (#92000283)	120 East Woodin Avenue; 47°50′23″N 120°01′06″W	Chelan	
36	Stehekin School	Stehekin School	May 31, 1974 (#74000913)	Along Stehekin Valley Road, about 0.25 miles (0.40 km) east of Rainbow Falls road junction, in Lake Chelan National Recreation Area; 48°20′27″N 120°41′52″W	Stehekin	
37	Steliko Ranger Station	Steliko Ranger Station	March 6, 1991 (#91000159)	Along Entiat River Road, about 0.6 miles (0.97 km) east of Ardenvoir, in Wenatchee National Forest; 47°44′36″N 120°21′40″W	Ardenvoir	Five contributing buildings in a 3.27 acres (1.32 ha) area. Some of the buildings are no more standing. Included in the USDA Forest Service Administrative Buildings in Oregon and Washington Built by the CCC MPS.
38	Stevens Pass Guard Station	Stevens Pass Guard Station	March 6, 1991 (#91000156)	Along US Highway 2, at Stevens Pass, about 13 miles (21 km) east of Skykomish, in Wenatchee National Forest; 47°44′44″N 121°05′18″W	Skykomish	
39	Stevens Pass Historic District	Stevens Pass Historic District	October 22, 1976 (#76001884)	About 22 miles (35 km) from Martin Creek Tunnel in the west to Cascade Tunnel in the east, across Stevens Pass, in Wenatchee National Forest; 47°46′15″N 121°00′06″W	Berne	
40	Sugarloaf Peak Lookout	Sugarloaf Peak Lookout	December 27, 1990 (#90001914)	End of Entiat Summit Road, on the summit of Sugarloaf Peak, about 12.7 miles (20.4 km) northwest of Leavenworth, in Wenatchee National Forest; 47°45′25″N 120°31′41″W	Leavenworth	
41	Sulphide-Frisco Cabin	Sulphide-Frisco Cabin	February 10, 1989 (#88003459)	Along Bridge Creek Trail, about 11.5 miles (18.5 km) north of Stehekin, in North Cascades National Park; 48°28′20″N 120°42′46″W	Stehekin	
42	Tyee Mountain Lookout		December 27, 1990 (#90001913)	Summit of Tyee Mountain, about 18 miles (29 km) northwest of Entiat, in Wenatchee National Forest; 47°51′51″N 120°28′17″W	Entiat	
43	U.S. Post Office and Annex	U.S. Post Office and Annex	May 27, 1977 (#77001331)	127 South Mission Street; 47°25′21″N 120°18′39″W	Wenatchee	Also contributing properties to Downtown Wenatchee Historic District
44	Wells House	Wells House	June 4, 1973 (#73001865)	1300 5th Street; 47°25′53″N 120°20′01″W	Wenatchee	
45	Wenatchee Carnegie Library	Wenatchee Carnegie Library	August 3, 1982 (#82004199)	2 South Chelan Avenue; 47°25′24″N 120°18′50″W	Wenatchee	
46	Wenatchee Fire Station #1	Wenatchee Fire Station #1	September 10, 2004 (#04000953)	136 South Chelan Avenue; 47°25′17″N 120°18′44″W	Wenatchee	
47	Wenatchee Flat Site		August 14, 1973 (#73001866)	Address restricted	Wenatchee	
48	West Monitor Bridge	West Monitor Bridge	July 16, 1982 (#82004197)	Spans Wenatchee River on Old Monitor Road; 47°30′04″N 120°25′32″W	Monitor	

== Former listing ==
	Name on the Register	Image	Date listed	Date removed	Location	City or town	Description
1	Centennial Flour Mill	Centennial Flour Mill	December 12, 1976 (#76001877)	July 16, 1990	701 South Wenatchee Avenue; 47°24′56″N 120°18′10″W	Wenatchee	

== See also ==
- List of National Historic Landmarks in Washington (state)
- National Register of Historic Places listings in Washington state
