= Buckner House =

Buckner House and variations may refer to:

in the United States (by state then city)

- Buckner House (Greensburg, Kentucky), listed on the National Register of Historic Places in Green County, Kentucky
- Walker Buckner House, Paris, Kentucky, listed on the National Register of Historic Places in Bourbon County, Kentucky
- Buckner House (Marshall, Missouri), listed on the National Register of Historic Places in Saline County, Missouri
- Dr. Philip Buckner House and Barn, Georgetown, Ohio, listed on the National Register of Historic Places in Brown County, Ohio
- Buckner Cabin, Stehekin, Washington, listed on the NRHP in Washington
- Buckner Homestead Historic District, Stehekin, Washington, listed on the NRHP in Washington
