= Golden West Visitor Center =

Coordinates: 48.3084°N 120.6564°W

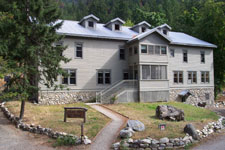
Golden West Visitor Center, formerly the Golden West Lodge

The Golden West Visitor Center is located at the southeast unit of North Cascades National Park Complex in the Lake Chelan National Recreation Area. It sits at the southern end of the small town of Stehekin, Washington and is the only National Park Service visitor center in the southeast unit of the Park Complex. It is the main ranger station for all traffic in and out from the south end of the park via boat, seaplane or by foot from the many hiking trails linking the Stehekin River Valley to the outside world.

== Services ==
The visitor center is open daily during the busier summer months of June–September. During the slower winter season (November through May); however, the Golden West is open intermittently. Due to lack of roads in or out of Stehekin, the majority of traffic to the Golden West/Stehekin area is by boat, seaplane or foot traffic. Hikers come on foot from the different trails that connect to Stehekin. During the peak summer months, the Golden West is host to a wide range of activities, events and presentations. The Visitor Center has a small gift shop, bookstore and information about local cultural and natural history. There is also updated trail information, local maps of the area and an art gallery. During the summer months, Park Service employees present naturalist talks, evening presentations and interpretive tours at the 312 foot (95 metre) tall Rainbow Falls.

== History ==
The Golden West Visitor Center was originally a lodge. Prior to the opening of what would be called the Golden West Lodge, "the Argonaut" provided the main lodging accommodations for visitors to Stehekin. The Argonaut began as a rough edifice in the early 1890s as a boarding house for miners. It eventually evolved over time into the elegant Hotel Field, owned and operated by the early entrepreneur Merritt Field. In 1926, the hotel's time came to an end when a dam was built in Chelan raising the lake to a level that would eventually flood the ground where the hotel stood. Jack Blankenship was the last manager at the Hotel Field. Foreseeing the end of the Hotel Field, Blankenship saved essential parts of the doomed hotel and brought them to higher ground across the lake, erecting a new resort, the Golden West Lodge in 1926. For much of its life, the Golden West Lodge operated through difficult economic times: the Great Depression, World War II, and the beginning of the automobile tourism, not ideal for a destination like Stehekin. The Lodge passed through the hands of seven different owners until it closed in the 1970s and was repurposed as North Cascades National Park's Golden West Visitor Center.

The Visitor Center is now registered as a National Historic Site and is part of the Golden West Lodge Historic District.
