= George Miller House (Stehekin, Washington) =

Historic house in Washington, United States

- U.S. National Register of Historic Places
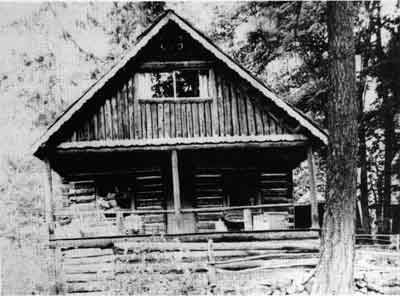

- Location within Washington (state)
- Location: Shortly east of Stehekin Valley Road, Stehekin, Washington, in Lake Chelan National Recreation Area
- Coordinates: 48°18′41″N 120°39′24″W
- Built: c.1938-c.1942
- Architect: Blankenship, Jack
- MPS: North Cascades National Park Service Complex MRA
- NRHP reference No.: 88003464
- Added to NRHP: February 10, 1989

The George Miller House is a rustic log cabin near Stehekin, Washington, United States, in Lake Chelan National Recreation Area. The cabin was built in 1938 and continues to function as a residence.

It is a one-and-a-half-story log house 22 by 32 feet (6.7 m × 9.8 m) in plan with a shed-roofed addition for a kitchen on one side. It is built on a rock foundation and has a brick chimney in the addition.

It was built Jack Blankenship in c.1938-c.1942, and was lived in by Guy "Dad Imus" Imus, Sr., during 1945–46. It was purchased by George Miller in the late 1940s.
