= Ruby Theater =

Ruby Theater or Ruby Theatre may refer to:

- Ruby Theater (Chelan, Washington), listed on the NRHP in Washington
- Ruby Theatre (Singapore), a former theatre that was located in Balestier, Singapore
- Ruby Theatre (Three Forks, Montana), listed on the NRHP in Montana
