= Ranger station =

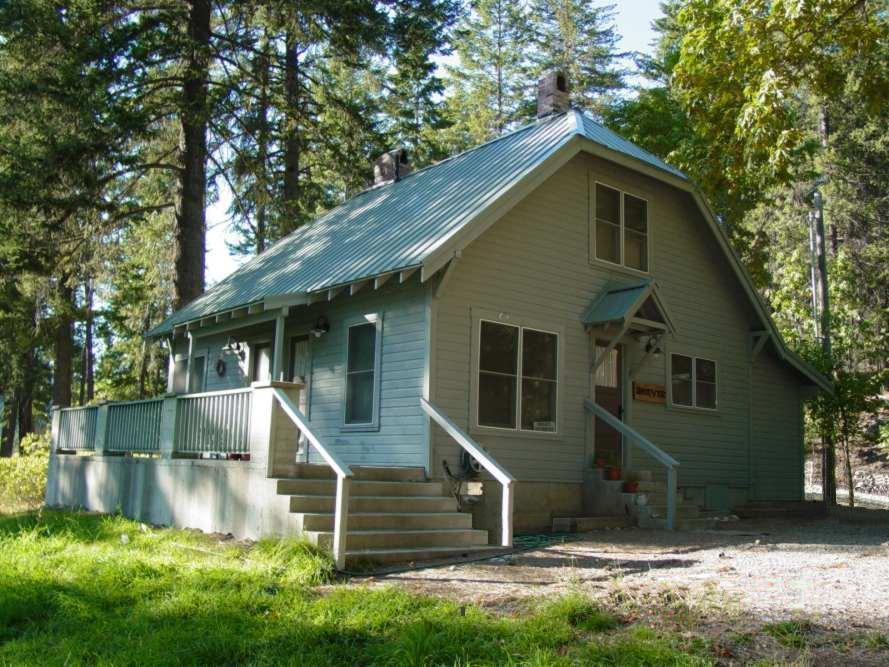
Purple Point-Stehekin Ranger Station House in Chelan County, Washington

A ranger station is a building complex typically including a dwelling and outbuildings which support a ranger or other guardian of a wilderness or national forest area.

For example, the Cold Meadows Guard Station in Idaho County, Idaho, United States, is a complex of six buildings and structures in the Payette National Forest.
