= Golden West Lodge Historic District =

Historic district in Washington, United States

- U.S. National Register of Historic Places
- U.S. Historic district
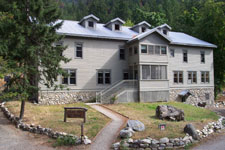

- Location within Washington (state)
- Location: End of Stehekin Valley Road, Stehekin, Washington, in Lake Chelan National Recreation Area
- Coordinates: 48°18′31″N 120°39′23″W
- Area: 4 acres (1.6 ha)
- Architect: Jack Blankenship
- MPS: North Cascades National Park Service Complex MRA
- NRHP reference No.: 88003442
- Added to NRHP: February 10, 1989

The Golden West Lodge Historic District includes the Golden West Lodge (now the Golden West Visitor Center) and six log cabins around it in Stehekin, Washington. Built in 1926, the lodge used salvaged portions of the Field Hotel, demolished the same year when the level of Lake Chelan was raised. Located in Lake Chelan National Recreation Area, the lodge was rehabilitated to function as the National Park Service Stehekin District Headquarters and Visitor Center in 2002.

The district was added to the National Register of Historic Places in 1989.

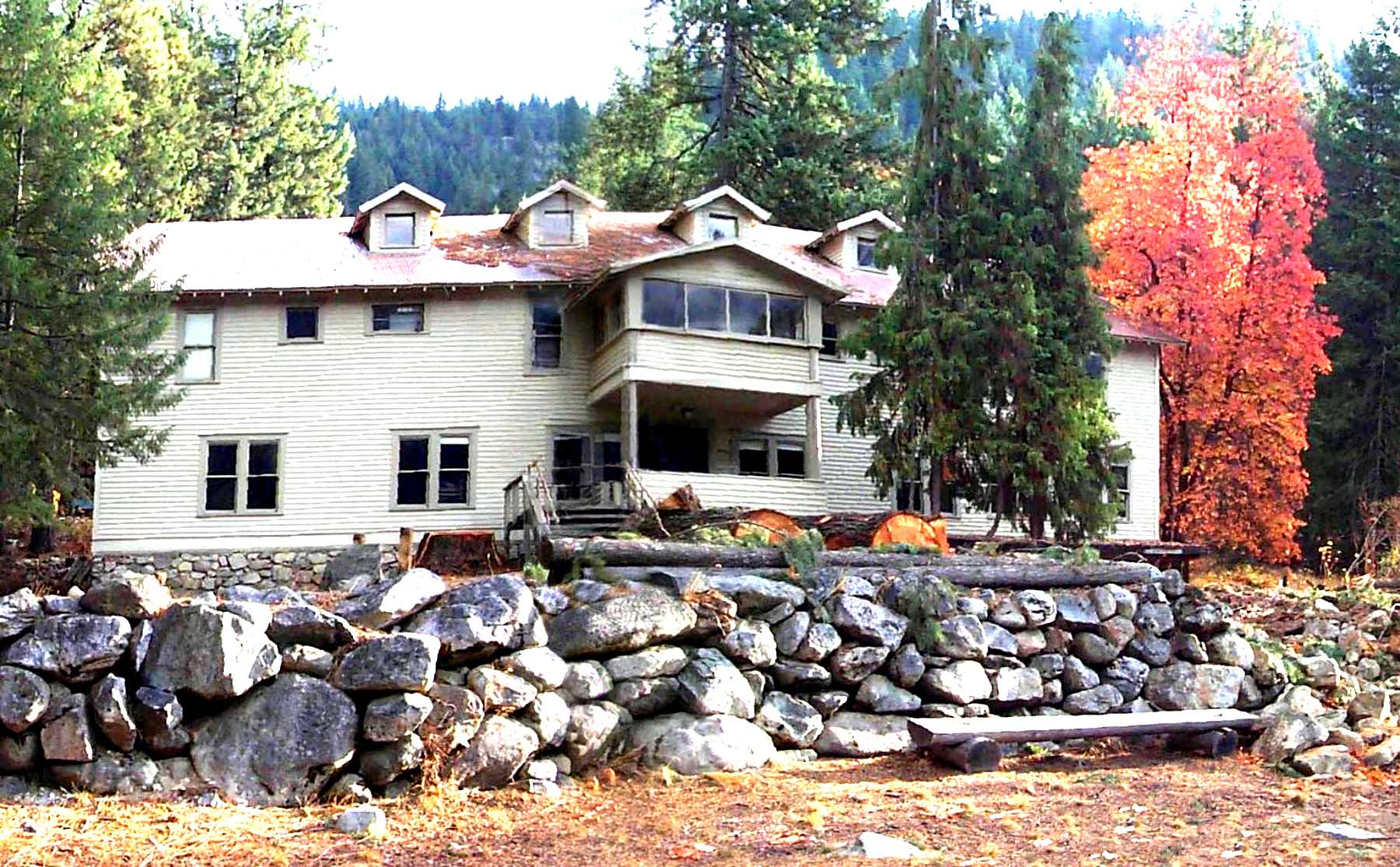
Golden West Lodge prior to renovation

== See also ==
- Purple Point-Stehekin Ranger Station House, also listed on the National Register of Historic Places and located just south of the historic district.
