= Sulphide–Frisco Cabin =

Historic house in Washington, United States

- U.S. National Register of Historic Places
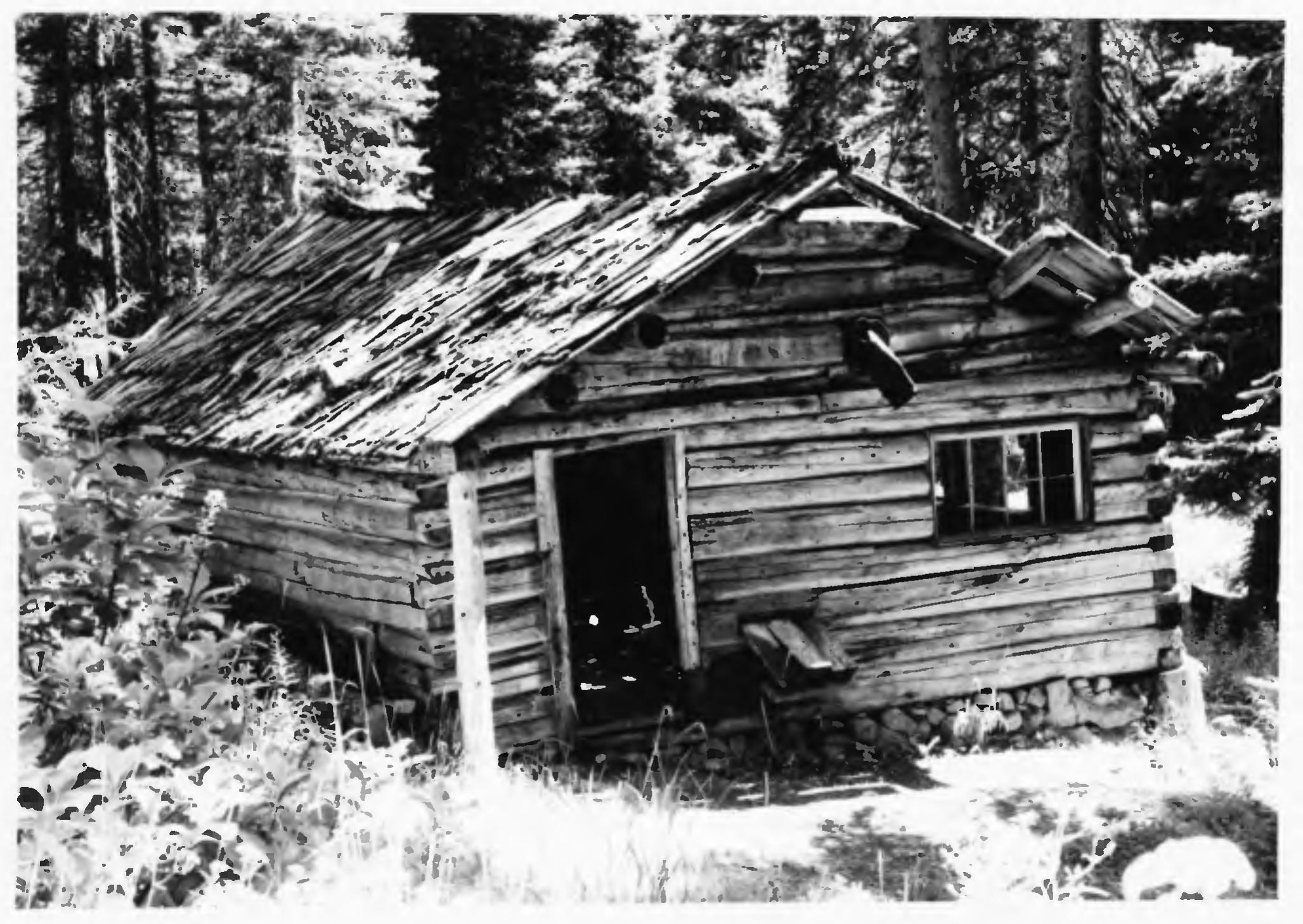
- Sulphide Frisco Cabin

- Location within Washington (state)
- Location: Along Bridge Creek Trail, about 11.5 miles (18.5 km) north of Stehekin, in North Cascades National Park
- Nearest city: Stehekin, Washington
- Coordinates: 48°28′20″N 120°42′46″W
- Area: less than one acre
- Built: 1929
- MPS: North Cascades National Park Service Complex MRA
- NRHP reference No.: 88003459
- Added to NRHP: February 10, 1989

The Sulphide Cabin, also known as the Frisco Cabin, is a log cabin located along Bridge Creek Trail in North Cascades National Park, in the U.S. state of Washington. Constructed sometime in the 1920s by A.H. Peterson and his nephew, the cabin was a warm season residence used while Peterson worked his mining claim. The cabin was constructed plainly of rounded hewn logs, half notched at the corners. The cabin has two rooms and is 18 by 25 ft (5.5 by 7.6 m) with a door at each of the two shorter ends above which rises a gable roof which is wood shingled. Sulphide–Frisco Cabin was placed on the National Register of Historic Places in 1989 as it is the only remaining residence associated with mining in the Stehekin region of the park.
