= Buckner Cabin =

Historic house in Washington, United States

- U.S. National Register of Historic Places
- U.S. Historic district – Contributing property
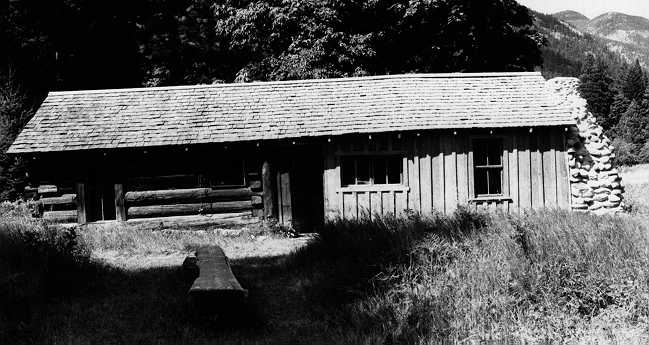

- Location within Washington (state) Location within the United States
- Location: End of Rainbow Lane, about 2.6 miles (4.2 km) northwest of Stehekin, Washington, in Lake Chelan National Recreation Area
- Coordinates: 48°20′05″N 120°42′04″W
- Area: 1.1 acres (0.45 ha)
- Built: 1889
- Built by: William Buzzard
- Part of: Buckner Homestead Historic District (ID88003441)
- NRHP reference No.: 74000912

Significant dates
- Added to NRHP: May 17, 1974
- Designated CP: February 10, 1989

The Buckner Cabin, also known as William Buzzard's Cabin, located about 2.6 miles (4.2 km) northwest of Stehekin, Washington in Lake Chelan National Recreation Area of North Cascades National Park Complex, is one of a group of structures relating to the theme of early settlement in the Lake Chelan area. The original cabin, listed individually as the Buckner Cabin on the National Register of Historic Places, was built in 1889 by Willam Buzzard and altered in 1911 by William and Harry Buckner. The surrounding structures are included in the Buckner Homestead Historic District.

The cabin has been added to the National Register of Historic Placesin 1974 and has been included in the Buckner Homestead Historic District in 1989.
