= Lucerne, Washington =

Unincorporated community in Washington, United States

- Unincorporated community
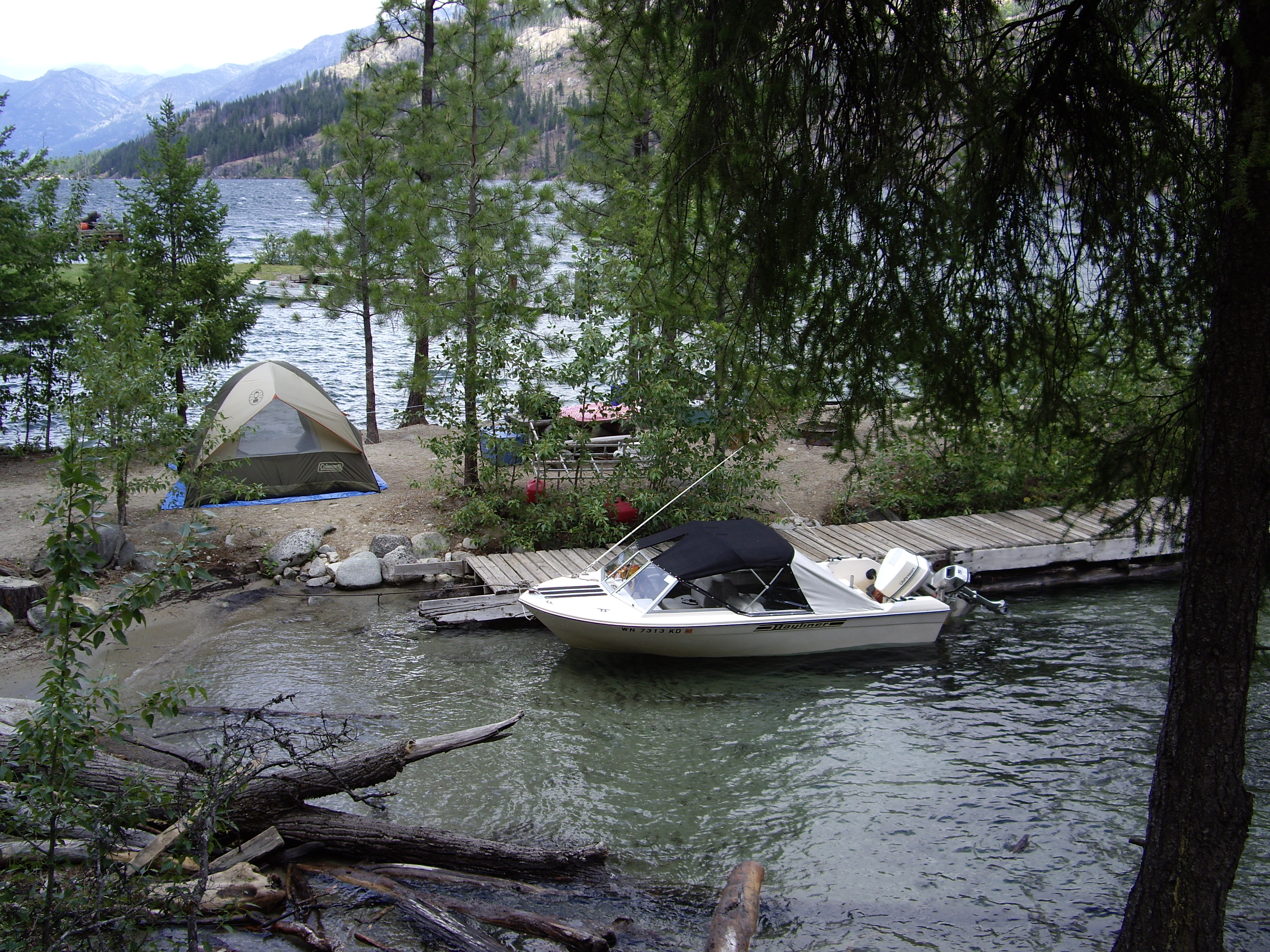
- Campsite at Lucerne

- Location within Washington (state)
- Coordinates: 48°12′08″N 120°35′28″W
- Country: United States
- State: Washington
- County: Chelan
- Elevation: 1,109 ft (338 m)
- Time zone: UTC-8 (Pacific (PST))
  - Summer (DST): UTC-7 (PDT)
- ZIP code: 98816
- Area code: 509
- GNIS feature ID: 1522558

Lucerne is an unincorporated community in Chelan County, Washington, United States. Lucerne is assigned the ZIP code 98816.

A post office was in operation at Lucerne from 1909 until 1930. The community was named after Lake Lucerne, in Switzerland, the native home of an early settler.

== Geography ==
The community is located along the shore of Lake Chelan at the mouth of Railroad Creek at an elevation of approximately 1,109 feet above sea level. The surrounding terrain is rugged and mountainous, with steep slopes rising to heights over 4,000 feet above the lake in the immediate vicinity of Lucerne. The community is located within the Wenatchee National Forest. There are two boat-in campgrounds operated by the U.S. Forest Service in Lucerne. There is no road access into Lucerne, though a commercial ferry connects the community with Stehekin at the northern end of the lake and the city of Chelan at the southern end.
