= Rainbow Falls (Chelan County) =

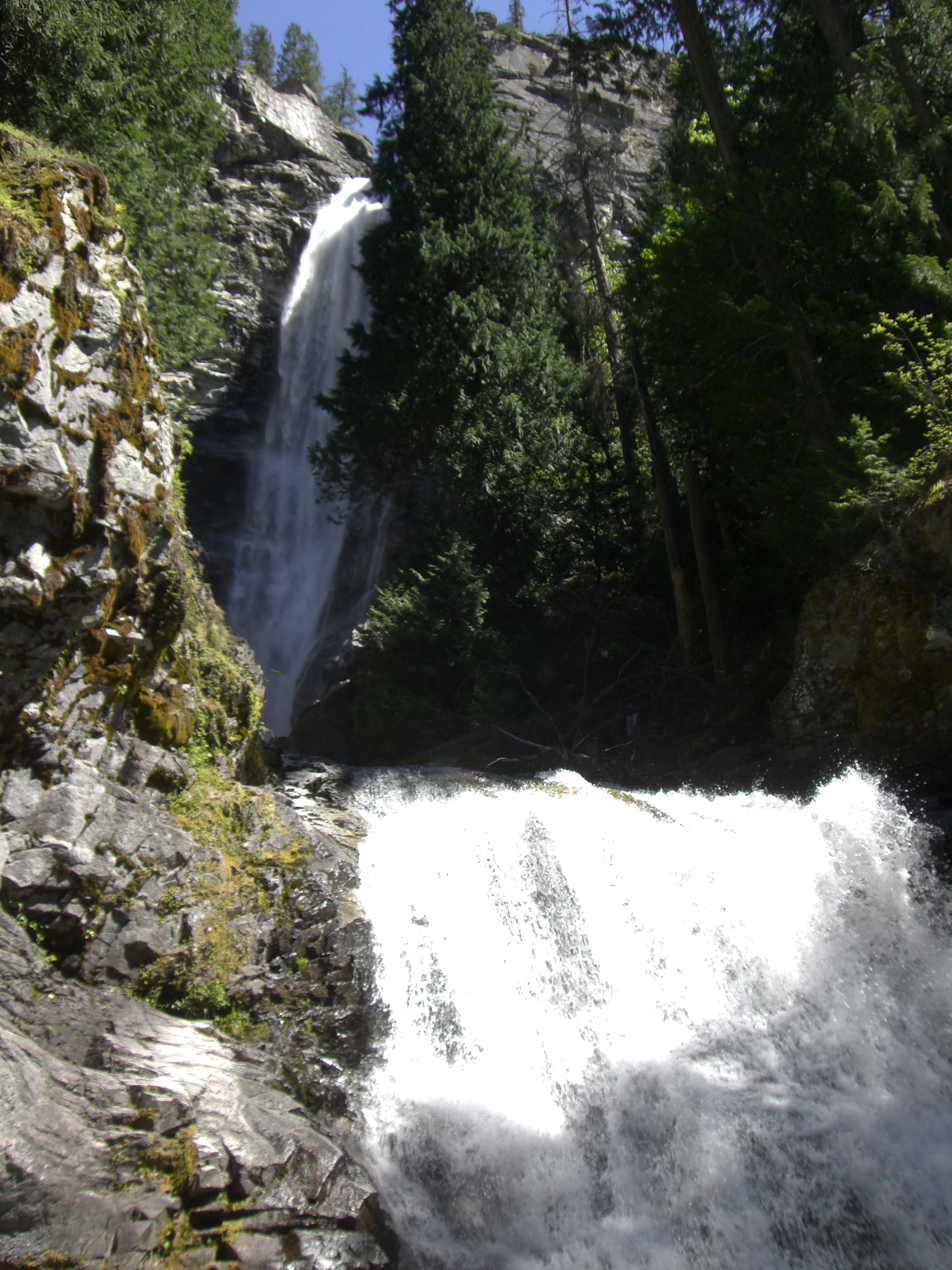
- Rainbow Falls with moderate flow viewed from bottom on north shore
- Interactive map of Rainbow Falls
- Location: Chelan County, Washington, United States
- Coordinates: 48.344°N 120.699°W
- Type: Tiered
- Total height: 392 feet (119.5 m)
- Number of drops: 2
- Longest drop: 312 feet (95.1 m)
- Total width: 15 feet (4.6 m)
- Watercourse: Rainbow Creek

Rainbow Falls is a waterfall on Rainbow Creek in the U.S. state of Washington. The waterfall is located inside the Lake Chelan National Recreation Area in the North Cascades National Park, and is near Stehekin. The falls drops 392 feet (119.5 m) in two tiers. The uppermost tier falls 312 feet (95.1 m) to a basin.

The waterfall is accessible from a series of trails maintained by the National Park Service and is easily visible from the Stehekin Valley Road. During the summer months a National Park Service shuttle provides regular transport from the Stehekin dock to Rainbow Falls.

== See also ==
- List of waterfalls
