= Downtown Wenatchee Historic District =

Historic district in Washington, United States

- U.S. National Register of Historic Places
- U.S. Historic district
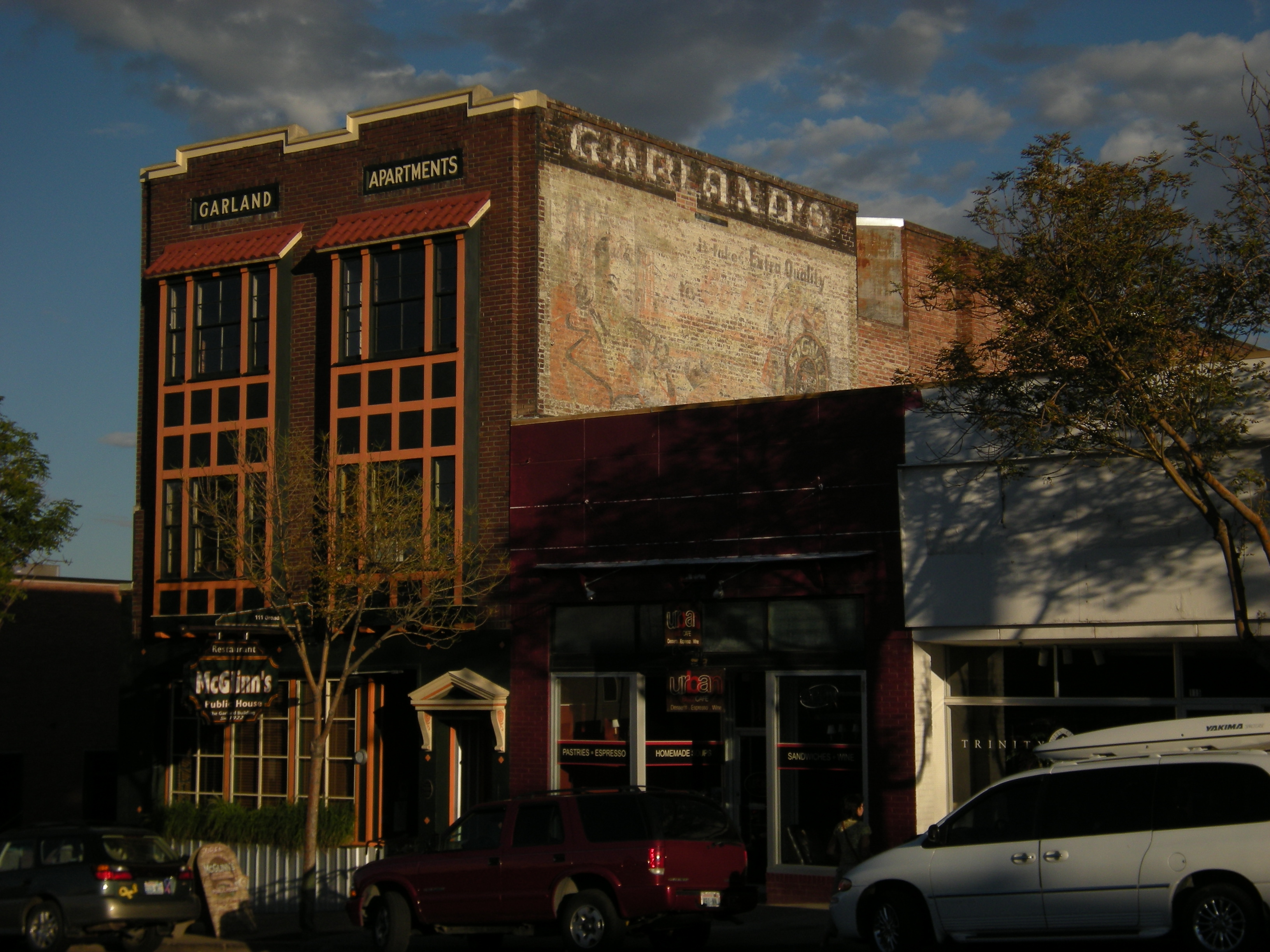
- Garland Building, 111 Orondo Avenue, in 2008

- Location within Washington (state)

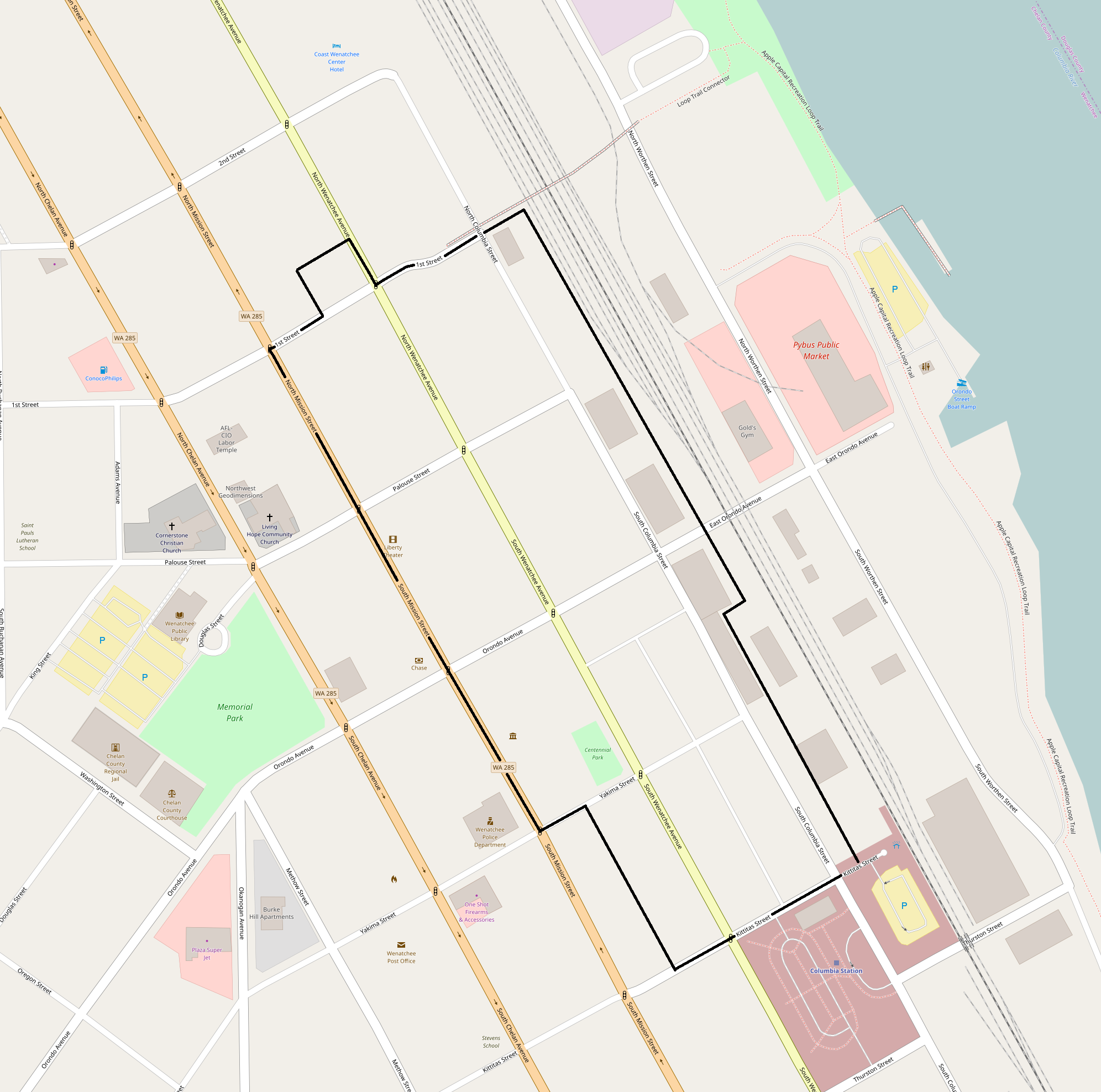
- Location: Roughly bounded by North and South Columbia Street, Mission Street, First Street, and Kittitas Street, Wenatchee, Washington
- Coordinates: 47°25′24″N 120°18′38″W
- Area: 34 acres (14 ha)
- Architect: Bebb & Mendel; Et al.
- Architectural style: Late 19th and Early 20th Century American Movements; Early Commercial Style
- NRHP reference No.: 08001200
- Added to NRHP: December 17, 2008

The Downtown Wenatchee Historic District, located in Wenatchee, Washington, United States, is a historic district listed on the National Register of Historic Places. The district, encompassing 34 acres (14 ha), is a collection of commercial, mixed-used, and warehouse buildings located in the central business district of Wenatchee downtown. It contains a total of 57 contributing and 32 noncontributing properties.

The district was added to the National Register of Historic Places in 2008. The Old Post Office Building and the Old Post Office Annex had also been previously listed in the National Register as a single individual property in 1977.

== Contributing Properties ==
The historical district contains a total of 57 contributing properties, built between 1902 and 1955:

- Old Stone Warehouse Building, 29 North Columbia Street, 47°25′34″N 120°18′39″W, built c. 1906
- Dow Fruit Company, 101 South Columbia Street, 47°25′25″N 120°18′32″W, built c. 1920
- Wells and Wade, 231 South Columbia Street, 47°25′19″N 120°18′27″W, built 1928
- Eagle Transfer, 234 South Columbia Street, 47°25′17″N 120°18′28″W, built 1922
- Wells and Wade Machine Works Shop, 200-204 South Columbia Street, 47°25′20″N 120°18′30″W, built c. 1948
- Hamilton Cold Storage, 138 South Columbia Street, 47°25′22″N 120°18′31″W, built 1925
- Wenatchee Cold Storage, also known as Wells and Wade Hardware, 122 South Columbia Street, 47°25′23″N 120°18′32″W, built c. 1940s
- Pybus, 3 Orondo Avenue, 47°25′25″N 120°18′34″W, built c. 1918
- Holland Machine Shop, formerly part of Pybus, 5 Orondo Avenue, 47°25′24″N 120°18′34″W, built c. 1921
- Building at 13 Orondo Avenue, 47°25′24″N 120°18′35″W, built c. 1928
- Building at 12 South Columbia Street, 47°25′28″N 120°18′37″W, built c. 1909
- Fruit Growers Service Building, 10 South Columbia Street, 47°25′29″N 120°18′37″W, built c. 1926
- Coca-Cola Company Building, now hosting the North Central Regional Library, 16 North Columbia Street, 47°25′32″N 120°18′40″W, built 1939
- Central Building, 25 North Wenatchee Avenue, 47°25′33″N 120°18′43″W, built 1912
- Weister Building, 21 North Wenatchee Avenue, 47°25′32″N 120°18′42″W, built 1906
- J.S. Mooney Building, 19 North Wenatchee Avenue, 47°25′32″N 120°18′42″W, built 1906
- Public Farmers Market, 9 North Wenatchee Avenue, 47°25′31″N 120°18′41″W, built 1922
- Doneen Building, 5 North Wenatchee Avenue, 47°25′30″N 120°18′41″W, built 1929
- Wenatchee Federal Savings & Loan, 5 South Wenatchee Avenue, 47°25′29″N 120°18′40″W, built 1926
- Rialto Theatre, 7 South Wenatchee Avenue, 47°25′28″N 120°18′39″W, built 1921
- Building at 9 South Wenatchee Avenue, 47°25′28″N 120°18′39″W, built 1922
- Wells Morris Hardware, 13 South Wenatchee Avenue, 47°25′28″N 120°18′39″W, built c. 1902
- Building at 15-17 South Wenatchee Avenue, 47°25′27″N 120°18′38″W, built 1920
- Morris Hardware, 21 South Wenatchee Avenue, 47°25′27″N 120°18′38″W, built 1920
- Morris Hardware, 23 South Wenatchee Avenue, 47°25′27″N 120°18′38″W, built c. 1910
- Halbert Block, 29 South Wenatchee Avenue, 47°25′26″N 120°18′37″W, built 1910
- Wenatchee Hotel Building, 107 South Wenatchee Avenue, 47°25′24″N 120°18′36″W, built 1910
- Montgomery Ward, 123 South Wenatchee Avenue, 47°25′23″N 120°18′35″W, built 1929
- Northwestern Fruit Exchange, also known as Midway Motors, 131 South Wenatchee Avenue, 47°25′21″N 120°18′33″W, built 1913
- Wells & Wade Hardware Building #1, 201 South Wenatchee Avenue, 47°25′19″N 120°18′32″W, built 1920
- Wells & Wade Building #2, 221 South Wenatchee Avenue, 47°25′18″N 120°18′31″W, built 1925
- Wells & Wade Building #3, 223 South Wenatchee Avenue, 47°25′18″N 120°18′31″W, built 1925
- Wells & Wade Building #4, 225 South Wenatchee Avenue, 47°25′17″N 120°18′30″W, built 1925
- Columbia Brewing Company, 14 Kittitas Street, 47°25′17″N 120°18′29″W, built c. 1928
- Old City Jail Building, 238 South Wenatchee Avenue, 47°25′16″N 120°18′33″W, built 1910
- Wenatchee Cycle Building, 224 South Wenatchee Avenue, 47°25′17″N 120°18′33″W, built 1929
- B.A. Thayer Building, 222 South Wenatchee Avenue, 47°25′17″N 120°18′33″W, built 1925
- B.A. Thayer Building, 220 South Wenatchee Avenue, 47°25′17″N 120°18′34″W, built 1925
- Warren Building, 200-204 South Wenatchee Avenue, 47°25′19″N 120°18′35″W, built 1920
- Seattle First Bank Building, now hosting Washington Federal Bank, 30 South Wenatchee Avenue, 47°25′25″N 120°18′39″W, built 1955
- S.H. Kress Building, 22 South Wenatchee Avenue, 47°25′26″N 120°18′41″W, built 1929
- Building at 16 South Wenatchee Avenue, 47°25′27″N 120°18′41″W, built 1922
- Building at 12 South Wenatchee Avenue, 47°25′27″N 120°18′41″W, built 1926
- Mills Brothers Building, 10 South Wenatchee Avenue, 47°25′27″N 120°18′42″W, built 1906
- Fuller Quigg Building, 103 Palouse Street, 47°25′28″N 120°18′42″W, built 1913
- Olympia Hotel Building, 2 North Wenatchee Avenue, 47°25′29″N 120°18′43″W, built 1908
- O.B. Fuller Building, 10 North Wenatchee Avenue, 47°25′30″N 120°18′44″W, built 1909
- Ellis Forde Building, 14 North Wenatchee Avenue, 47°25′30″N 120°18′44″W, built 1905
- Classen Drugs, 18 North Wenatchee Avenue, 47°25′31″N 120°18′44″W, built 1908
- Cascadian Hotel, 102 North Wenatchee Avenue, 47°25′33″N 120°18′47″W, built 1929
- Bennet's Cascadian Garage, 33-35 North Mission Street, 47°25′31″N 120°18′48″W, built 1927
- Liberty Theatre, 1 South Mission Street, 47°25′27″N 120°18′44″W, built 1920 (received significant damage in 2025)
- Eagles Lodge Building, 13-15 South Mission Street, 47°25′26″N 120°18′43″W, built 1927
- World Hotel, 23 South Mission Street, 47°25′25″N 120°18′42″W, built 1910
- Garland Building, 111 Orondo Avenue, 47°25′23″N 120°18′39″W, built 1922
- Old Post Office Building, now hosting the Wenatchee Valley Museum & Cultural Center, 127 South Mission Street, 47°25′21″N 120°18′39″W, built 1938, also individually listed as U.S. Post Office and Annex
- Old Post Office Annex, 127 South Mission Street, 47°25′19″N 120°18′38″W, built 1918, also individually listed as U.S. Post Office and Annex

== See also ==
- National Register of Historic Places listings in Washington
