= Stehekin School =

- U.S. National Register of Historic Places
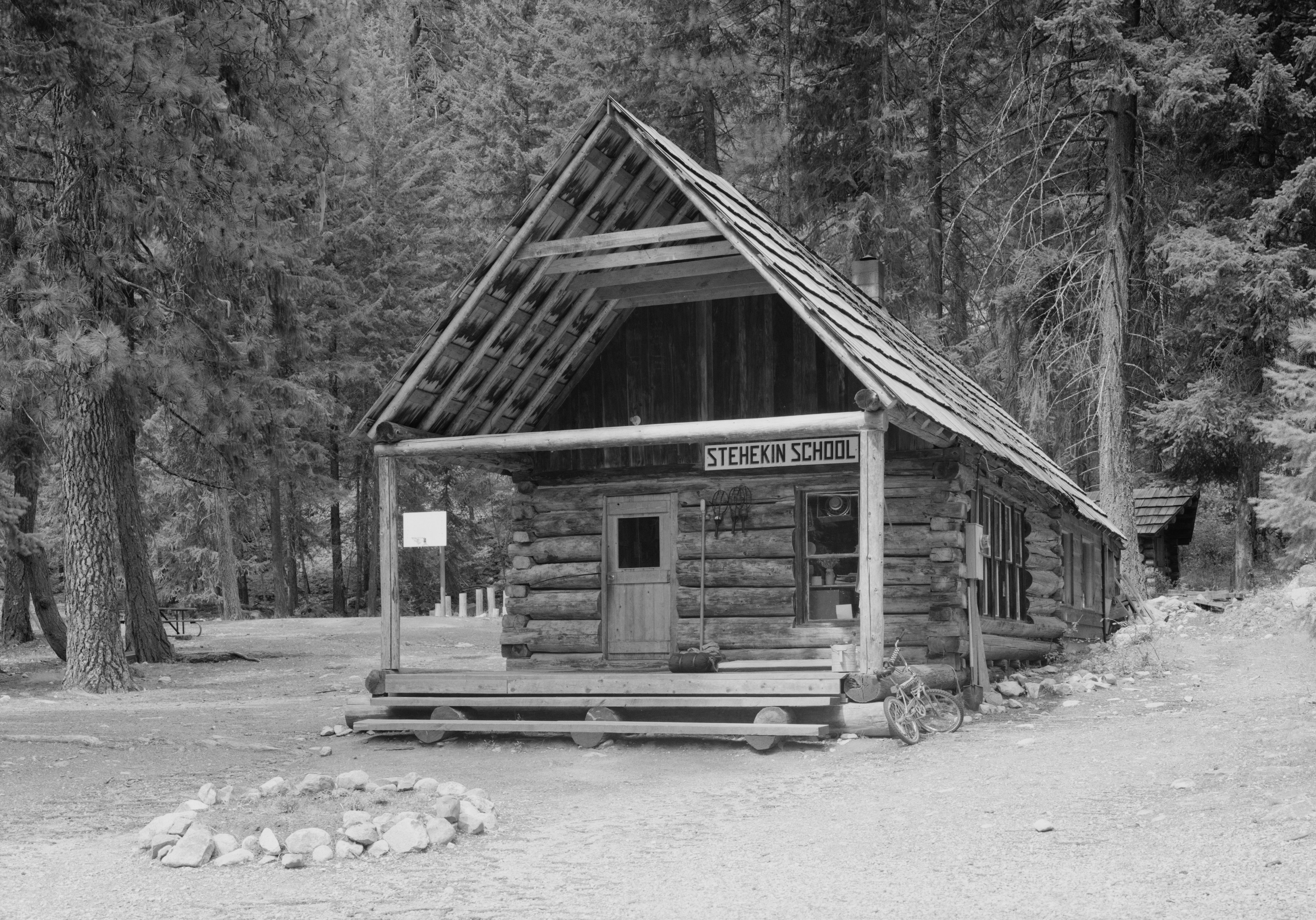

- Location within Washington (state)
- Location: Along Stehekin Valley Road, about 0.25 miles (0.40 km) east of Rainbow Falls road junction, in Lake Chelan National Recreation Area
- Nearest city: Stehekin, Washington
- Coordinates: 48°20′27″N 120°41′52″W
- Built: 1921
- NRHP reference No.: 74000913
- Added to NRHP: May 31, 1974

The Stehekin School is a log structure built in 1921 as a school for the community of Stehekin, Washington. The property includes two outhouses and a separate kindergarten cabin. The school was used from 1921 to 1988, when a new school was built.

Stehekin School was added to the National Register of Historic Places in 1974.
