= Buckner House (Marshall, Missouri) =

Historic house in Missouri, United States

- U.S. National Register of Historic Places
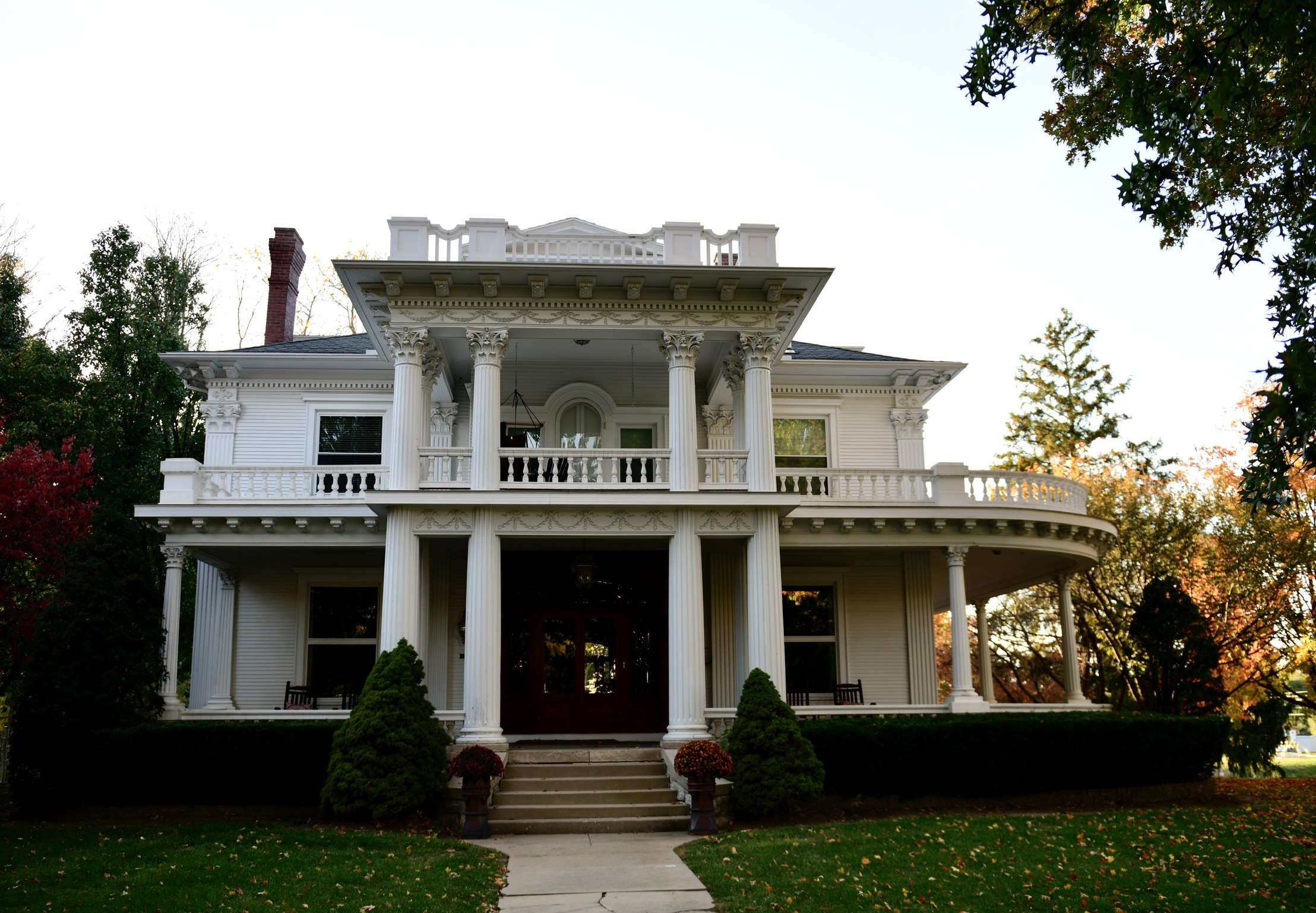

- Location within Missouri Location within the United States
- Location: 125 N. Brunswick Ave. Marshall, Missouri
- Coordinates: 39°7′22″N 93°11′25″W
- Area: less than one acre
- Built: 1906
- Built by: Ed. R. Page, Sr.
- Architect: Carman, George
- Architectural style: Classical Revival
- NRHP reference No.: 84002581
- Added to NRHP: April 19, 1984

Buckner House is a historic home located at Marshall, Saline County, Missouri. It was built in 1906, and is a two-story, three-bay, Classical Revival style frame dwelling with a hipped roof. It measures 48 feet by 48 feet and rests on a cut stone and concrete foundation. The front facade features an elaborate double porch.

It was added to the National Register of Historic Places in 1984.
