= Blewett Arrastra =

- U.S. National Register of Historic Places
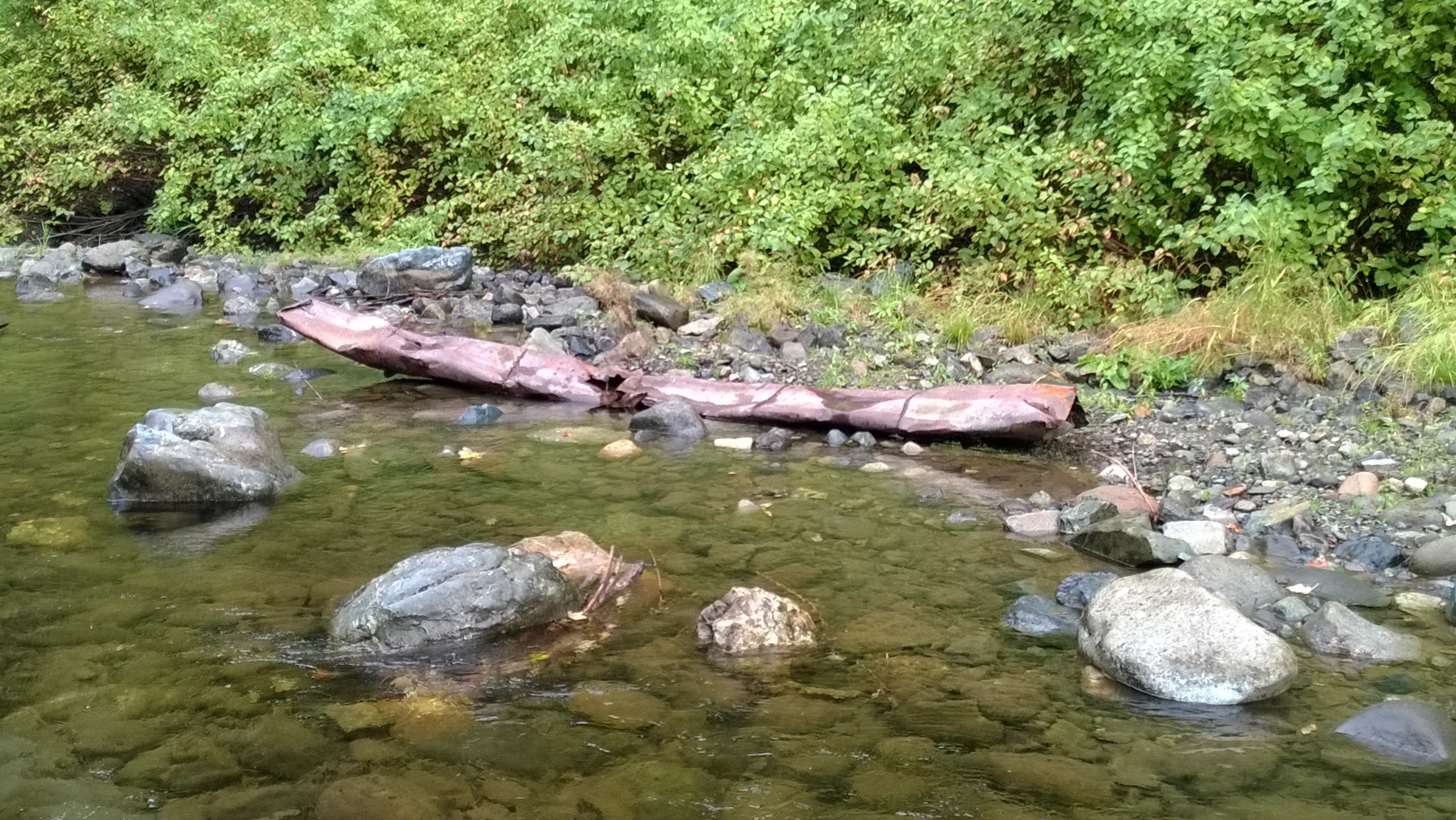
- Rusted mining equipment lines the shore of Peshastin Creek near the site of the historic Blewett arrastra.

- Location within Washington (state)
- Nearest city: Cashmere, Washington
- Coordinates: 47°25′37″N 120°39′25″W
- Area: less than one acre
- Built: 1863
- Architectural style: Arrastra
- NRHP reference No.: 74001941
- Added to NRHP: September 17, 1974

The Blewett Arrastra is a historic site near Cashmere, Washington, United States. The Blewett Arrastra is in the steep and narrow valley of Peshastin Creek. A roadside pullout on U.S. Route 97, in the Wenatchee National Forest. The arrastra is adjacent to the fast-running creek From as early as 1860 until the early 20th century, the gold mining town of Blewett occupied this section of the valley. Up the hill to the northwest a few hundred yards (meters) there are the abandoned shafts, and the remains of a stamp mill, and the stone arrastra. Many of the structures and buildings were destroyed, particularly when the highway was improved. The arrastra was cut into the bedrock and is about 8 feet (2.4 m) across. Only the base in the bedrock remains. The rocks used to crush the ore against the base are missing. These rocks were often worn down and replaced. Along the track, there are three such drag stones from other arrastras. The process used here to drag these crushing stones is unknown.

== Location ==
The Blewett or Peshastin Mining District is on the eastside of the Cascade Range in the Peshastin Valley between Cle Elum and Cashmere. U.S. Route 97 crosses linking these cities over Blewett Pass. The mine workings are along

== History ==
When gold was discovered in the 1860s and 1870s in Washington, California miners came with many others to the Cascade Mountains of Washington Territory. John Shafer located first quartz claim in 1874 near the head of Culver gulch. Shortly after, the Pole Pick, and the Hummingbird, were begun. Soon the Bobtail, John Olden and Peter Wilder the Fraction, and the Little Culver were begun. Following the same lead eastward the Peshastin and Blackjack claims were located. On the east side of Peshastin creek, the Golden Chariot and Tiptop claims were established. West of Culver gulch, down into Etienne (Negro creek at the time) creek, were the Shafer, Vancouver and Seattle mines of Marshall Blinn. These were purchased by the Cascade Mining Company. Additionally, locations on the Pole Pick and the North Star ledges defined an east-west mineralized zone.

The area was served by a trail until 1879 when a wagon road was built from Cle Elum, over Blewett Pass. The ore came from a quartz, which being oxidized required only milling to separate the gold. Initially, arrastras were built for crushing the ores. Two remained in used and ceased operation before 1911. Late in the seventies a six-stamp mill was built that operated by waterpower. This mill served the upper Culver gulch tunnels for eight years. In 1891 a ten-stamp mill was erected by the Culver Mining Company. The Blewett Mining Company bought it in 1892 and resold it in 1896 to Thomas Johnson. This mill served the Pole Pick, Tip Top, Blackjack, Peshastin, and claims on the ridge between Culver and Culver Springs gulches. By 1896, Blewett Mining built the twenty-stamp mill at the mouth of Culver gulch and began a systematic underground development of the property. From 1894 to 1897 Blewett Minning would leasing portions of the mines for a royalty fee, opening the upper portion of the gulch. In 1896 the Warrior General Company was organized and purchased Blewett Minning Companies property for $35,000. Warrior General reorganized and became the Chelan Mining and Milling Company. At time the Peshastin ore was being accessed by driving a series of south crosscuts from Culver gulch. These rich ore bodies increased the activity of the Blewett district. In 1905 this and the La Rica joined as the Washington Meteor Company. The mines remained active through 1911.

== Description ==
The Blewett Arrastra is in the steep and narrow valley of Peshastin Creek and adjacent to a roadside pullout on U.S. Route 97 in the Wenatchee National Forest. The arrastra is adjacent to the fast-running creek From as early as 1860 until the early 20th century, the gold-mining town of Blewett occupied this section of the valley. Up the hill to the northwest a few hundred yards (meters) there are the abandoned shafts, and the remains of a stamp mill, and the stone arrastra. Many of the structures and buildings were destroyed, particularly when the highway was improved. The arrastra was cut into the bedrock and is about 8 feet (2.4 m) across. Only the base in the bedrock remains. The rocks used to crush the ore against the base are missing. These rocks were often worn down and replaced. Along the track, there are three such drag stones from other arrastras. The process used here to drag these crushing stones is unknown.

== Bibliography ==
- Hodges, L.K., ed. Mining in the Pacific Northwest. Seattle, 1897.
- Paul, Rodman W. California Gold; The Beginning of Mining in the Far West. Lincoln: University of Nebraska Press, 1947, pp. 134–40.
- Trimble, William J. The Mining Advance Into the Inland Empire.; Madison Bulletin of the University of Wisconsin, No. 638, 1914, pp. 93–96.
