= Stevens Pass Historic District =

Historic district in Washington, United States

- U.S. National Register of Historic Places
- U.S. Historic district
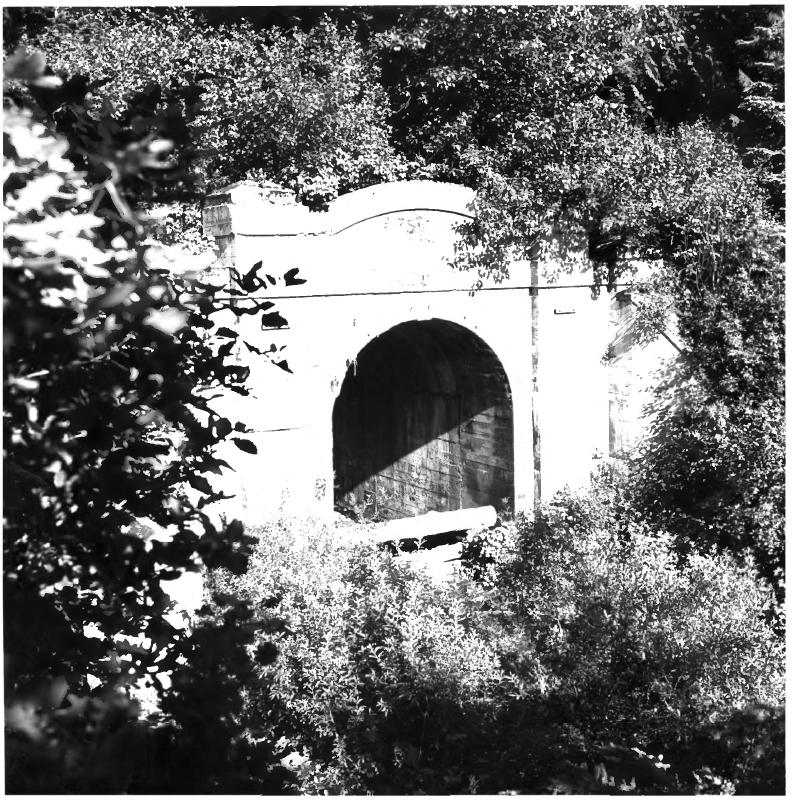
- Stevens Pass First tunnel for railroad route

- Location within Washington (state)
- Location: Martin Creek Tunnel to Cascade Tunnel across Stevens Pass
- Nearest city: Berne, Washington
- Coordinates: 47°46′15″N 121°00′06″W
- Area: 13,000 acres (5,300 ha)
- Built: 1897
- Built by: Great Northern Railway
- NRHP reference No.: 76001884
- Added to NRHP: October 22, 1976

The Stevens Pass Historic District is an area within a large rectangle 3.2 by 18.2 miles (5.1 by 29.3 km) and extends from the Martin Creek Tunnel on the western slope of the crest to the eastern portal of the present Cascade Tunnel above Nason Creek on the eastern slope. The area is ruggedly mountainous and the terrain is covered with timber and granitic outcroppings. The Cascade Range interfered with the Great Northern Railway effort to develop a deep water western terminus in Puget Sound. A gap in the Cascade Range, at Stevens Pass, was found suitable at an elevation slightly in excess of 4,000 feet (1,200 m) about 45 miles (72 km) east of Seattle. The first effort an elaborate switchback system, replaced by a tunnel which was itself replaced by a second tunnel.

Stevens Pass Historic District was added to the National Register of Historic Places in 1976.

== Switchbacks ==
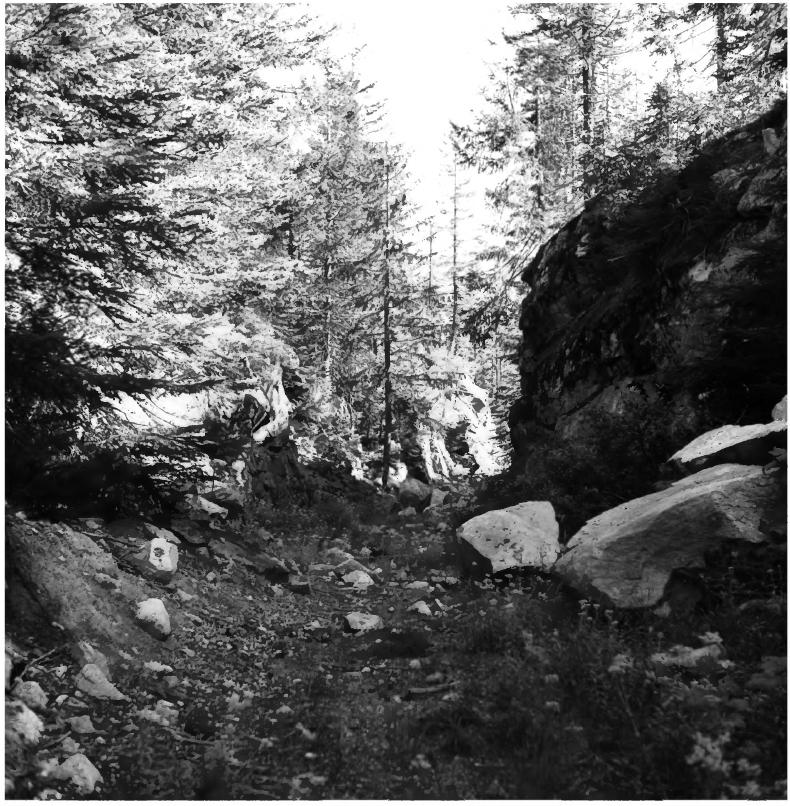
Stevens Pass switchback for railroad route, King County, Washington.

A survey was made in 1890 and 1891. A complex route over Stevens Pass was devised using a set of switchbacks. Benches were cut into the mountainside. Timber trestles were used to span small valleys. Three lettered switchbacks were built on the eastern slope and five on the steeper western slope; the approach grade to each was a maximum of 2.2% although the grade increased within the switchback system itself to a maximum of 3.5% on the east and 4.0% on the west. Trains traversing the route entered a spur about 1000 feet long at the end of each switchback, the track was switched and the train moved out again to the next leg, a tedious process of going forward and then in reverse until the Cascade Range was crossed.

The switchback route was complicated and time consuming. Thirteen miles (21 km) of track were needed to connect two points three miles apart. Winter snows and slides made the passage slow and not practical for extended use. By 1897, a better route and method was needed to cross the range. A tunnel was begun in 1897, which would by-pass the switchbacks.

== First Tunnel ==
The tunnel as completed in 1900 was 13,283 feet (4.049 km) long with a 1.7% grade descending to the west. The eastern portal was at elevation 3,347 feet (1,020 m) and the western at elevation 3,123 feet (952 m). Both portals have a concrete facing with two pilasters flanking the tunnel mouth and a pyramidal cap. The entire length of the tunnel is lined with concrete. Prior to the Wellington Disaster in 1910, the pass was protected by 17 snow sheds for a total length of 7,593 feet (2,314 m). The structures were added over time, as the need became apparent. The sheds did not block the slides but carried the debris over the right of way. Additions to the snow shed protection totaled construction of 5,411 feet (1,649 m) in length, located at 26 points from 29 miles (47 km) east of the Cascade Tunnel to 9.5 miles (15.3 km) west. A double-track reinforced concrete snow shed 3,900 feet (1,200 m) long was built in Wellington. Believed to be the first double-track shed built. With the increase in traffic over the line made possible by the improvements, interruptions increased as heavier snows blocked exposed portions of the track. In 1913, the Railway began a series of improvements on the west slope of the Cascade. As a result of these endeavors, eight of the twelve miles of track between the Cascade Tunnel and Scenic were covered by tunnels or snow sheds. Included in this construction was the Windy Point Tunnel, some 1,200 feet (370 m) long, which permitted the double tracking of the line along an almost vertical cliff. A second tunnel of note in the route was the Martins Creek tunnel, located immediately west of Martin Creek. Tracks approached the tunnel portal on a bridge and the tunnel turned about 170 degrees in a rising curve, the tracks crossing over Martin Creek again on a second bridge. The tunnel, built in 1911, was an unusual solution to a difficult problem and it was aptly called the Horseshoe Tunnel. The snow sheds added during this period were combination structures of wood and concrete. Reinforced or mass concrete was used for the back wall and timber formed the roof and supporting pillars; the largest shed constructed in this series was 4,100 feet (1,200 m) long. The maintenance of the sheds was expensive. Electrification of the line began in 1909. A simplified route was needed.

Diagram of railroad paths across Stevens Pass WA.

== Frank Stevens ==
Probably no one was so firmly connected with James J. Hill's route over Stevens Pass than John Frank Stevens, after whom the pass is named. Stevens was born in 1853 and raised on a farm in Maine. Like many engineers of the time, he had no formal education but went to work for the railroad, first surveying in Maine and then moving west, working as a rodman in Minneapolis and a section hand in Texas. Before going to work for Hill in 1889, he had laid out the lines for half a dozen western railroads including the Canadian Pacific. He had gained an enviable reputation by dint of competent hard work and in his travels "he had been treed by wolves, chased by Indians, struck down by Mexican fevers, marooned by blizzards, given up for lost on more than one occasion (and) had developed a robust physique that seemed impervious to climate". The Great Northern was recognized as the best engineered railroad in the country and to Stevens must go much of the credit. In 1905 he was appointed by Theodore Roosevelt as Chief Engineer to the "graveyard of reputations", the Panama Canal, which he pulled out of inaction and placed on the road to completion. He went back to work for Hill in 1909 and then worked as a consulting engineer in New York. In 1917, he was asked by Woodrow Wilson to go to Russia as head of the American Railway Commission; at the request of the Russians, he stayed as an adviser until 1922. In 1927, he was elected president of the American Society of Civil Engineers and in 1937, at the age of 83, he flew to the Panama Canal in a Pan American clipper. He died on June 2, 1943.

== Bibliography ==
- Anderson, Eva G. Rails Across the Cascades. Wenatchee Wenatchee World Publishing Company, 1952 (?)
- Hult, Ruby El. Northwest Disaster: Avalanche and Fire; Portland: Binfords & Mort, 1960
- Sandstrom, Gosta. Tunnels. New York: Holt, Rinehart and Winston, 1963.
- "Concrete and Timber Snowsheds on the Great Northern Railway". Engineering News, Vol. 36 No. 24 (December 15, 1910).
- "Tunnels and Snowsheds in the Cascades: Great Northern Railways". Engineering News, Vol. 71 No. 23 (June 4, 1914).
