= Purple Point-Stehekin Ranger Station House =

- Purple Point-Stehekin Ranger Station
- U.S. National Register of Historic Places
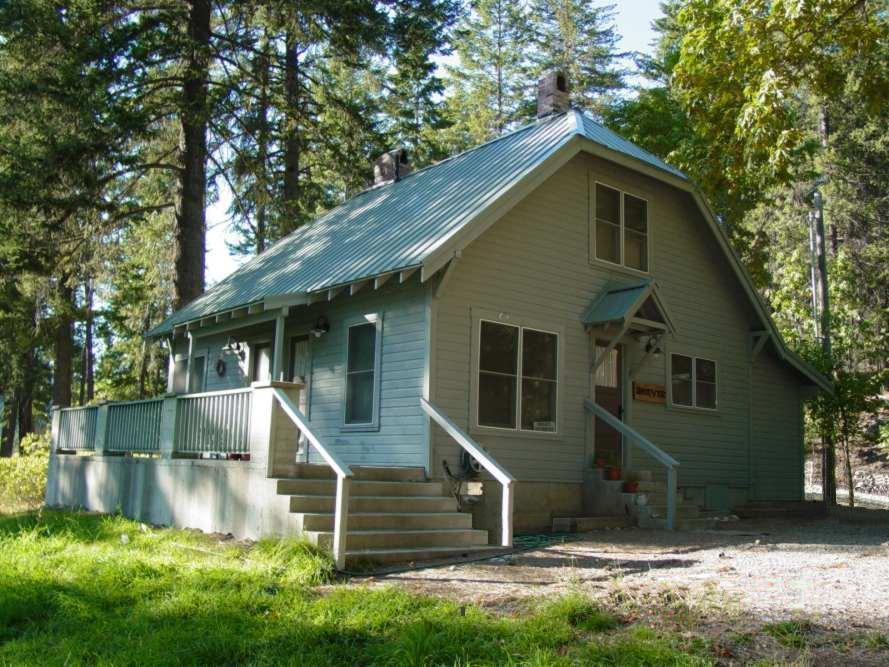
- Stehekin Ranger Residence, 2002
- Location: Along Stehekin Valley Road, Stehekin, Washington, in Lake Chelan National Recreation Area
- Nearest city: Stehekin, Washington, USA
- Coordinates: 48°18′27″N 120°39′19″W
- Built: 1926
- Architectural style: Simple wood-frame
- MPS: North Cascades National Park Service Complex MRA
- NRHP reference No.: 88003460
- Added to NRHP: February 10, 1989

The Purple Point-Stehekin Ranger Station House is a National Park Service ranger residence located in the Lake Chelan National Recreation Area of northern Washington. The building was built at Purple Point above Lake Chelan in the small, unincorporated community of Stehekin, Washington. It was originally constructed by the United States Forest Service to serve as the residence for the Stehekin District ranger. The Forest Service later converted it into a summer guard station. The building was transferred to the National Park Service in 1968 when the Lake Chelan National Recreation Area was established. The Purple Point-Stehekin Ranger Station House is listed on the National Register of Historic Places.

== History ==
The Chelan National Forest was established in 1908. It was the largest of the twenty national forests in the Pacific Northwest Region. To facilitate work in the forest, the Forest Service built ranger stations at strategic locations in the northern Cascade Mountains to house full-time employees and provide logistics support to fire patrols and project crews working at remote forest sites. One of those ranger stations was located in the small, unincorporated community of Stehekin at the head of Lake Chelan. Stehekin was particularly isolated, having no connection to the outside world except by horse trail or a fifty-mile boat ride up the length of Lake Chelan.

The Stehekin ranger station was established in 1910 as part of the Chelan National Forest. Originally, it was located north of the Field Hotel at the head of Lake Chelan. The first ranger station had two buildings. The first building, the office, was a simple log cabin, 22 feet (6.7 m) by 22 feet (6.7 m). The other building was an 18 by 22-foot (6.7 m) horse barn. This ranger station was abandoned in 1927 because of rising lake waters. A new ranger station was built at Purple Point well above the lake near Stehekin's boat landing. The Purple Point ranger station served as the headquarters for the Stehekin Ranger District until the early 1940s, when the Stehekin District was merged into the Chelan District.

The Stehekin District's first ranger was E.O. (Jack) Blankenship. He arrived in 1910 and served as ranger until 1920, when he resigned from the Forest Service to become general manager of the Golden West resort hotel in Stehekin. Blankenship was replaced by George Wright who filled the ranger position until 1926. He was, in turn, replaced by Roy L. Weeman. During Weeman's long tour as district ranger, the Forest Service enjoyed a particularly good relationship with the Stehekin community. In 1931, the Chelan National Forest Supervisor's Inspection Report on the Stehekin Ranger District credited Weeman with "maintaining good relations with his public," who were noted in the same report as being particularly "hard to handle." Horace G. Cooper replaced Weeman in 1935 as ranger, and served for one year. In 1936, Richard P. Bottcher arrived. He also stayed only one year. Bottcher was followed by William O. Shambaugh in 1937 and then Bob Foote in the early 1940s. Foote was the last district ranger to live full-time in the Purple Point ranger residence.

In the early 1940s, the Stehekin Ranger District was merged into the Chelan District. As a result, there was no longer a need for a full-time ranger station at Stehekin, and the district ranger was reassigned to the town of Chelan, Washington at the south end of Lake Chelan, where the headquarters of the combined district was located.

While the district headquarters moved to Chelan, the Purple Point facilities and the surrounding forest lands remained under the stewardship of the Forest Service for nearly three more decades. That changed in 1968 when the United States Congress established the North Cascades National Park and the Lake Chelan National Recreation Area. As a result of this action, the Purple Point ranger station and the forest land around Stehekin were transferred to the National Park Service.

== Structure ==
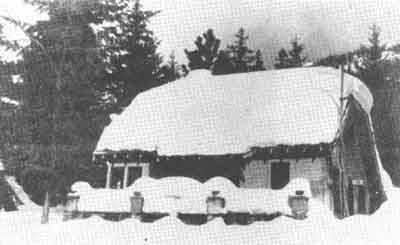
Winter view of Purple Point Ranger Station, c. 1930

The existing ranger residence was built in 1926 by the Forest Service to serve as the district ranger's home and office. Roy Weeman and his family were the first to live in the house. After the Weemans left, the house was occupied by four more full-time rangers. The last Forest Service family to occupy the house left in the early 1940s.

The Purple Point ranger residence is a wood-frame structure with a concrete foundation and metal roof. The house is a 1 1/2-story structure with a 26-by-30-foot footprint. The house has a jerkin-head gable roof and two brick chimneys. There is a large porch running the full length of the building's west side where the main entrance overlooks Lake Chelan. The back door is located on the south side of the building, and is covered by a small shed roof. The exterior is covered with a weatherboard. The building is painted light green with light green trim so that it blends into the surrounding forest landscape. The residence has 1,170 square feet (109 m^{2}) of interior space. The National Park Service renovated the building in 1975, 1991, and again in 1995.

In 1928, a combined warehouse, garage, and office was built across the road, southeast of the ranger residence. In 1934, the warehouse was enlarged. At the same time, a bunkhouse for summer fire crews was built across the road and up a slope to the east. In the late 1930s, a small, temporary Civilian Conservation Corps camp was established in Stehekin. In 1939, the Civilian Conservation Corps crew built a barn and a gas and oil house for the ranger station. Both of these structures were later demolished by the Forest Service.

Because of the building's distinctive architecture and its unique historic value as an early Forest Service ranger residence, the Purple Point-Stehekin Ranger Station House was listed on the National Register of Historic Places in 1989. The ranger station's warehouse and crew barracks still exist as well; however, both structures have lost their historic significance as a result of numerous alterations.
