= Ruby Theater (Chelan, Washington) =

- U.S. National Register of Historic Places
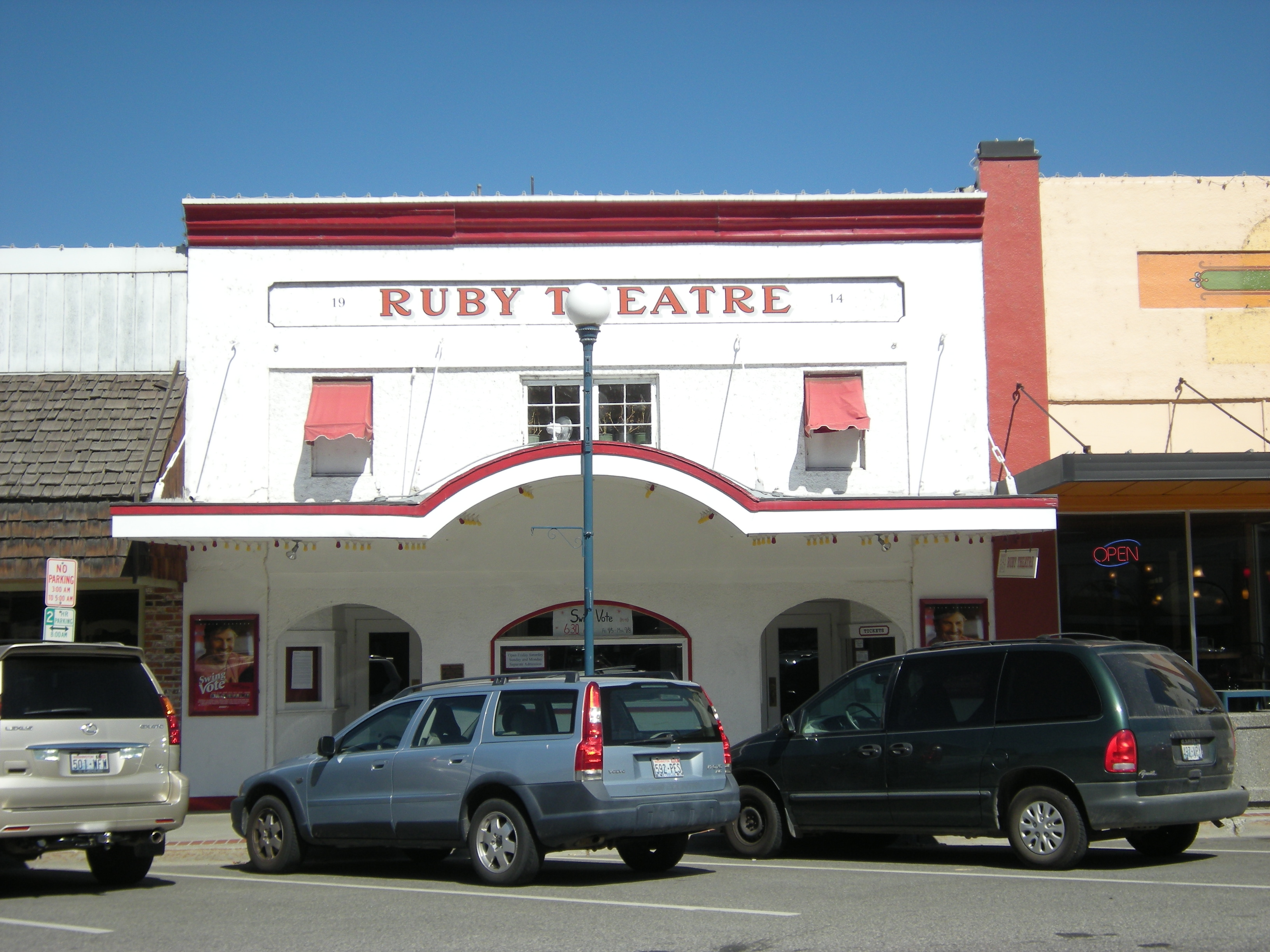

- Location within Washington (state) Location within the United States
- Location: 135 East Woodin Avenue, Chelan, Washington
- Coordinates: 47°50′25″N 120°01′03″W
- Area: less than one acre
- Built by: Herbert R. Kingman
- Architectural style: Late 19th And 20th Century Revivals, Renaissance Revival
- MPS: Movie Theaters in Washington State MPS
- NRHP reference No.: 91001495
- Added to NRHP: October 7, 1991

The Ruby Theater is a small movie theater located in Chelan, Washington. Built in 1914, it was named after Ruby Potter, the step-daughter of its manager, Frank Potter. The original owners were Herbert R. Kingman and Morrison M. Kingman. Original seating capacity was 225 on the main level and 125 in the balcony. The theater was equipped as a cinema and as a vaudeville house. With the exception of 1972-1974, the Ruby has been showing movies for over ninety years, and is one of the oldest movie theaters in Washington.

== History ==
Frank Potter moved his operation from the storefront Gem Theater to the Kingmans' new Ruby when the Kingmans' purpose-built theater opened. Competition initially came from the Auditorium, which burned shortly after the Ruby opened in 1914. Potter committed a murder/suicide in 1919, killing his wife and leaving behind 15-year-old Ruby. That year the Kingmans sold the theater to a barber named Kelsey from Omak. The Kelseys operated the theater themselves until 1937, then leased it to operators through 1972. The theater reopened in 1974.

== Description ==
The Ruby theater is located in the central business district of Chelan. The facade is stuccoed, with a central snack bar window flanked by recessed arched entries. The entries are sheltered by a prominent projecting marquee guyed from the facade, lit with bare electric light bulbs. The marquee spans the width of the building, with a shallow central arch. The upper level of the facade features a pair of windows flanked by single sash windows in a slightly recessed bay, with a prominent RUBY THEATRE above. The original entrance was in the center. The lobby spans the width of the building with entries into the house on either side of the shallow space. The house is a narrow rectangular space with a small horseshoe-shaped balcony over the last few rows of seats. The twelve-foot-deep stage is elevated and features a gilded plaster proscenium. Additional depth is provided by a non-historic thrust stage extension, about 12 feet (3.7 m) deep. The stage retains its trap doors and lighting, as well as storerooms and ventilation equipment under the stage. The projection room is on the upper level behind the balcony, as are the toilets.

The Ruby Theater was placed on the National Register of Historic Places on October 7, 1991.
