= Buckner Homestead Historic District =

Historic district in Washington, United States

- U.S. National Register of Historic Places
- U.S. Historic district
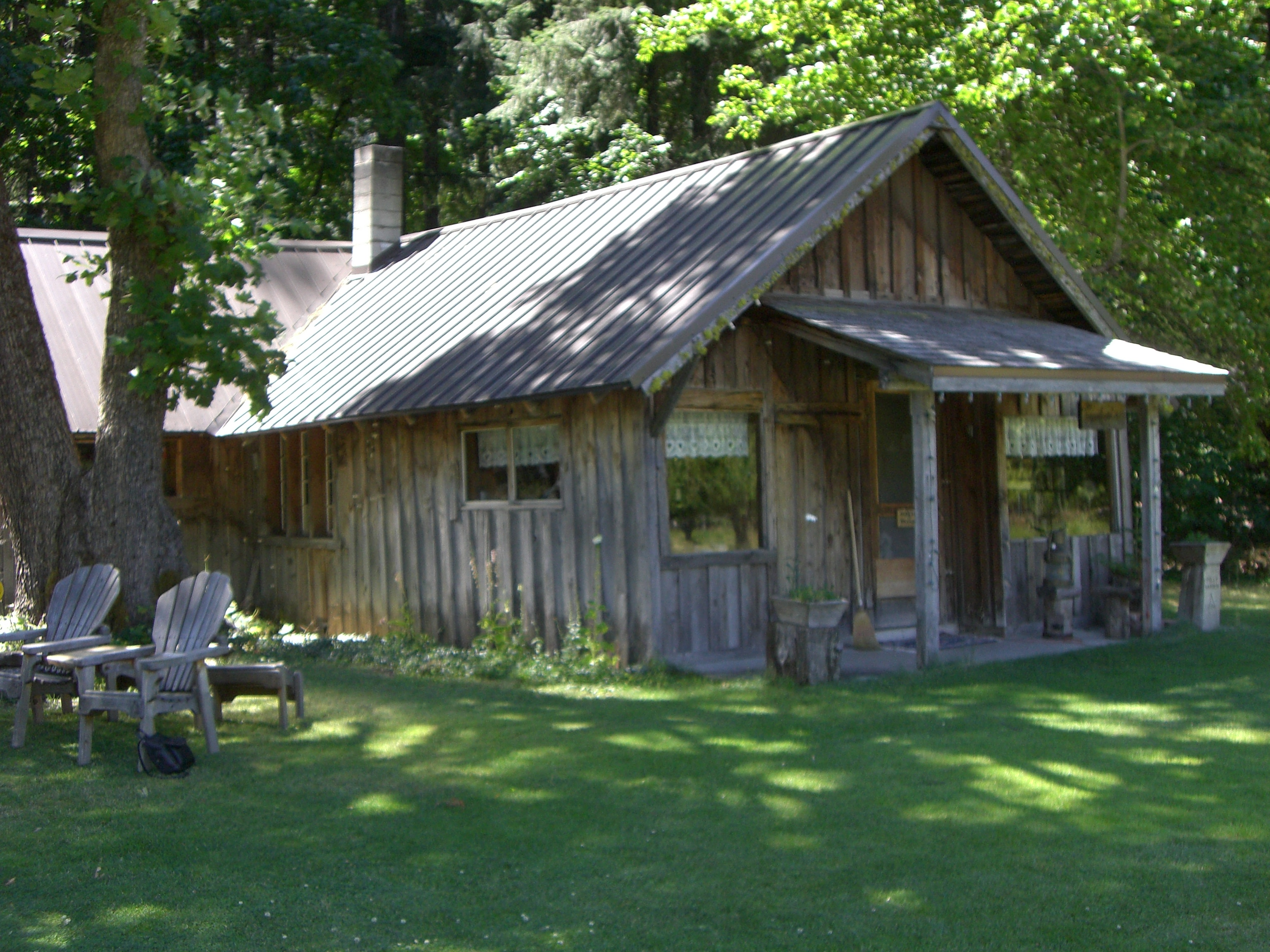
- Buckner family's main house

- Location within Washington (state)

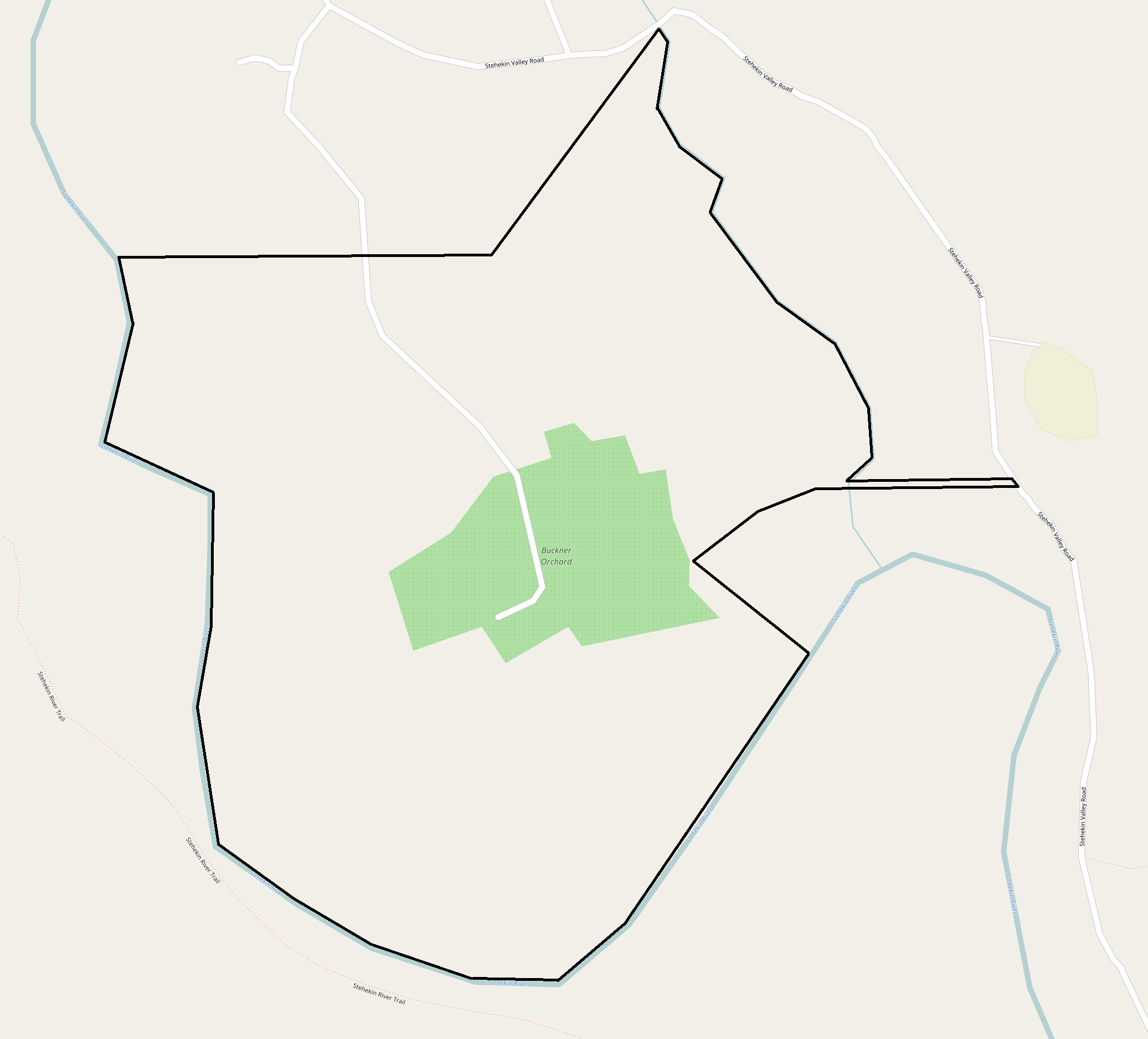
- Location: Along Rainbow Lane, about 2.6 miles (4.2 km) northwest of Stehekin, in Lake Chelan National Recreation Area (Note: Originally Address restricted, location was disclosed in 2016)
- Nearest city: Stehekin, Washington, USA
- Coordinates: 48°20′08″N 120°42′03″W
- Area: 105.5 acres (42.7 ha)
- Built: 1889-1950
- Architectural style: Log and wood-frame
- MPS: North Cascades National Park Service Complex MRA
- NRHP reference No.: 88003441
- Added to NRHP: February 10, 1989

The Buckner Homestead Historic District, near Stehekin, Washington in Lake Chelan National Recreation Area incorporates a group of structures relating to the theme of early settlement in the Lake Chelan area. Representing a time period of over six decades, from 1889 to the 1950s, the district comprises 15 buildings, landscape structures and ruins, and over 50 acres (200,000 m^{2}) of land planted in orchard and criss-crossed by hand-dug irrigation ditches. The oldest building on the farm is a cabin built in 1889. The Buckner family bought the farm in 1910 and remained there until 1970, when the property was sold to the National Park Service. The Buckner Cabin was listed on the National Register of Historic Places in 1974. The rest of the Buckner farm became a historic district in 1989. Today, the National Park Service maintains the Buckner homestead and farm as an interpretive center to give visitors a glimpse at pioneer farm life in the Stehekin Valley.

== Bill Buzzard ==
The property that became the Buckner farm was originally settled by William (Bill) Buzzard. It is located several miles north of Lake Chelan along the Stehekin River. When Buzzard arrived in 1889, his 160-acre (0.65 km^{2}) parcel was the farthest homestead from the Stehekin settlement at the head of the lake. Buzzard built a one-story log cabin on the site, and cleared some land for pasture and cultivation. In 1892, Buzzard shipped 1,000 pounds of potatoes 50 miles (80 km) down Lake Chelan to the town of Chelan, Washington and sold the rest of his crop to local miners. By 1895, Buzzard had planted a small apple orchard and was growing cabbages as well as potatoes. Buzzard also cut cordwood on his property and sold it to the steamboat company that operated on Lake Chelan. According to a 1902 United States Forest Service report on "agricultural settlement" in the Stehekin area, William Buzzard had a three-room house, log barn, and 25 acres (100,000 m^{2}) of cultivated land. On 9 November 1903, Buzzard officially purchased his homestead from the United States Government. He later sold 11 acres (45,000 m^{2}) to a neighbor.

== Buckner family ==
In 1910, Buzzard sold his remaining property to a Californian named William Buckner for $5,000. Instead of a lump-sum payment, Buzzard wanted $50 per month until the total amount was paid. After selling the property, Buzzard moved to Chelan where he lived until his death in 1919. When Buzzard died, Buckner was only one payment short of completing the agreement so he used the final $50 payment to purchase a headstone for Buzzard, who was buried in the Old Fraternal Cemetery in Chelan.

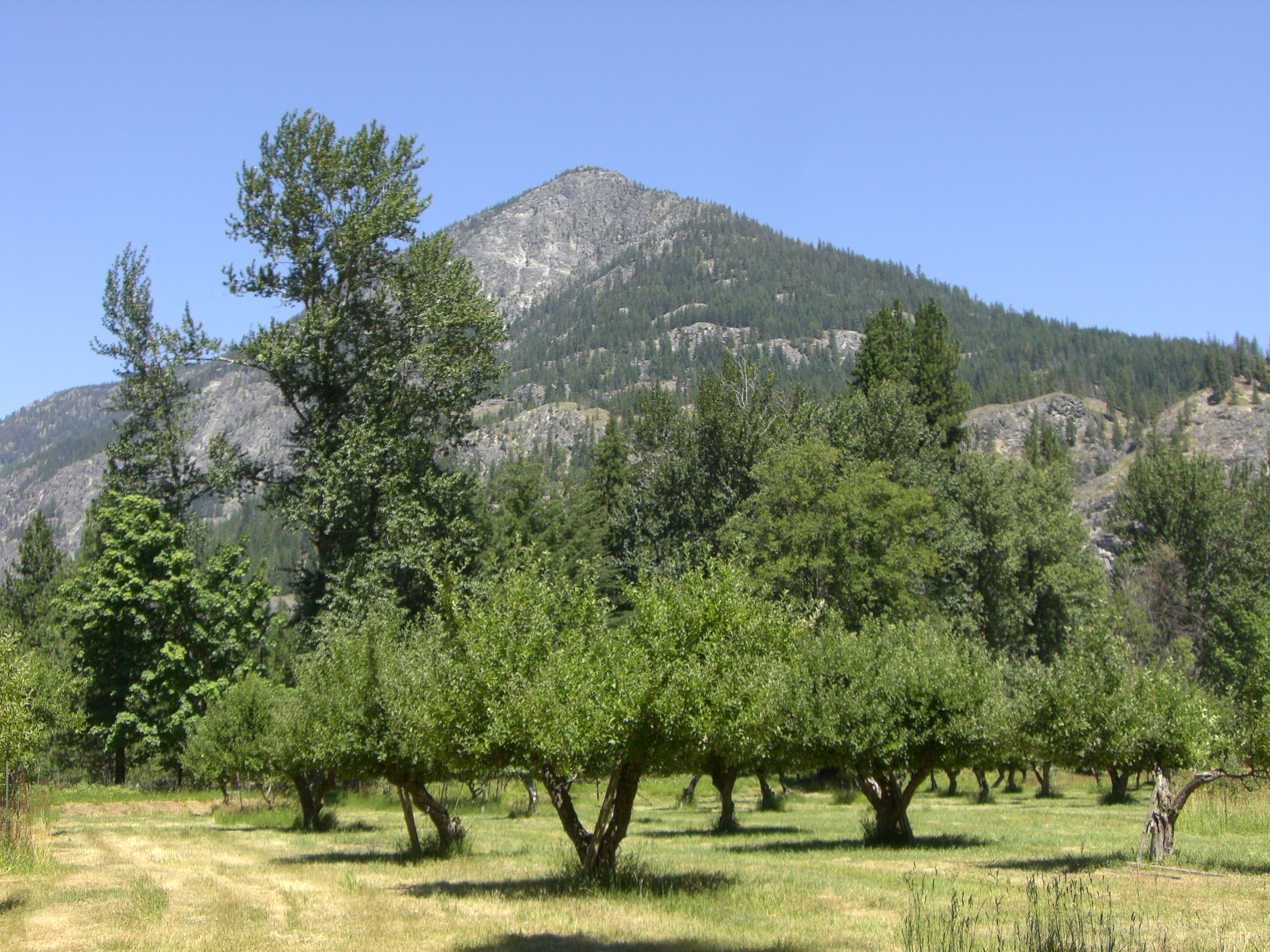
Buckner apple orchard below Rainbow Mountain

In 1911, Buckner brought his wife and three sons to the farm (also call the "Buckner ranch"). Upon arrival, the family found most of the land covered with stumps because the timber had been cut and sold by the previous owner. Over the next several years, the family cleared enough stumps to plant a 50-acre (200,000 m^{2}) apple orchard. The Buckners also designed an irrigation system that diverted water from Rainbow Creek to their orchard. The main irrigation canal and watering ditches, totaling over four miles (6 km), were all dug by hand during the summer of 1911.

Initially, the Buckner family only lived on the ranch during the summer, moving back to California in the fall to avoid Stehekin's harsh winters. However the family returned each spring to work their farm. Over the next few years, they constructed a variety of buildings for protecting animals, sheltering farm equipment, and preserving food. Eventually, the Buckner ranch had more than a dozen structures including a barn, workshop, milk house, smokehouse, root cellar, chicken coop, outhouse, sleeping cabins for guests or hired hands, and several general-purpose sheds. They also built a mile of wooden fence to enclose their entire property.

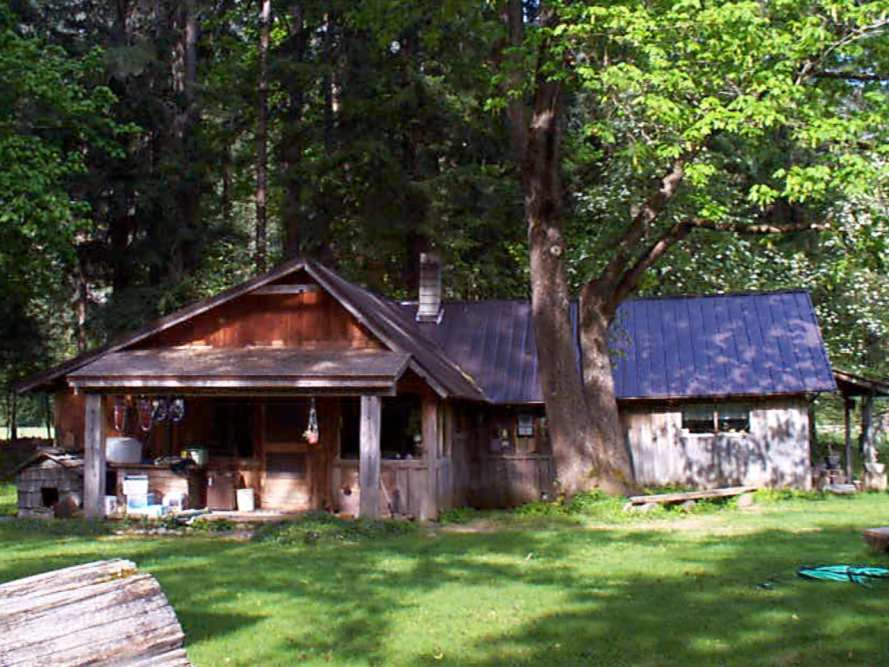
Buckner's main house built between 1914 and 1925

In 1915, Harry Buckner, one of William's sons, took up permanent residence at the ranch. In 1919 Harry married Olive, a young lady from Stehekin, and she joined him at the ranch. Since William Buckner and his wife continued to live in Bill Buzzard's log cabin during the summer months until 1924, Harry expanded one of sleeping cabins into a home for himself and his new wife. Harry and Olive worked hard to make the farm a comfortable place to live. They raised pigs, cows and chickens. The family grew vegetables in their garden, and planted large flower beds. When the family decided they wanted electric lights, Harry converted a smokehouse into a power generator house. Harry also built a play house for his three young daughters; and when the girls were older, he constructed a concrete swimming pool, fed by farm's irrigation system.

In 1922, the Buckners built a large packing shed to protect their apple harvest. In the 1930s and 1940s, the farm produced between 4,000 and 5,000 crates of apple each season. That was enough fruit to fill their 40-foot (12 m) by 100-foot (30 m) packing shed. This was the peak of the farm's production.

Olive Buckner died in 1948. Harry continued to live on the ranch and eventually remarried. In 1953, the packing shed roof collapsed under a heavy winter snow load. In 1956, Buckner retired from farming and became Stehekin's postmaster. In 1970, Buckner sold the homestead and most of his property to the National Park Service, retaining a parcel of land for his retirement home. He lived there until his death in 1976.

== National Park Service ==
After purchasing the Buckner property, the National Park Service incorporated it into the Lake Chelan National Recreation Area. The Buckner homestead and farm has been preserved, and is used by the National Park Service as an interpretive center to show visitors what pioneer life was like in the Stehekin Valley. Although it is no longer a commercial farm, horses still graze in the Buckner's pasture, water still flows through the irrigation ditches, and apples are still harvested from the orchard in the fall. While some changes have been made to the building in order to preserve them, many of the structures are still in use for their intended purpose, including the main house which is now home for a National Park Service employee.

Because of its unique historic value as an original settler's homestead, the Buckner Cabin (originally built by William Buzzard) was listed on the National Register of Historic Places in 1974 (NRHP #74000912). In 1989, the remaining elements of the Buckner farm were joined with the cabin to create the Buckner Homestead Historic District.

== Historic structures ==
The Buckner Homestead Historic District comprises 15 buildings, various landscape features, some old structural ruins, and approximately 50 acres (200,000 m^{2}) of apple orchard which is irrigated by hand-dug ditches.

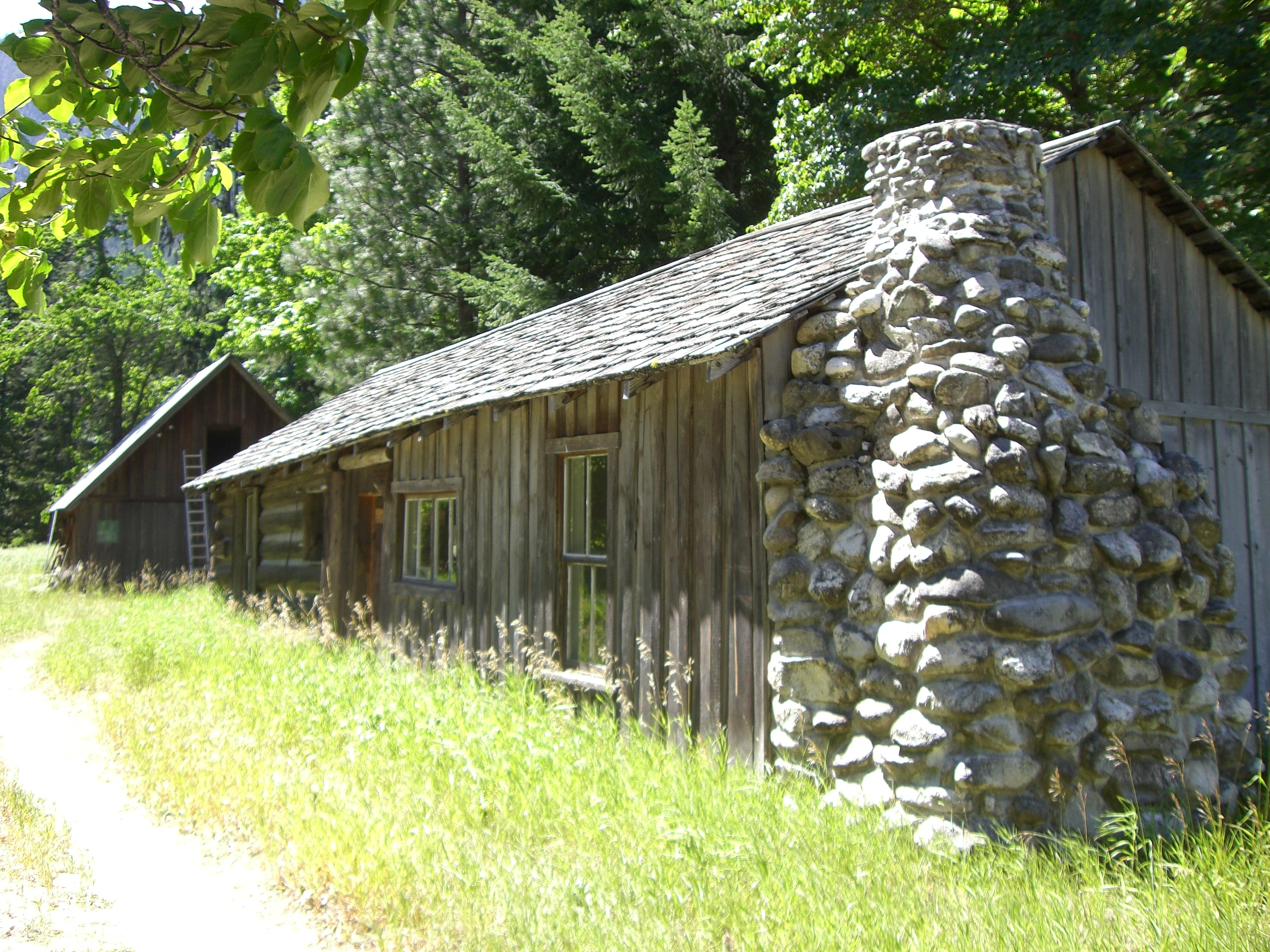
Buzzard-Buckner cabin built in 1889 near Stehekin

- The original William Buzzard Cabin was built in 1889. It was a one-story log cabin measuring 16 feet (4.9 m) by 18 feet (5.5 m). In 1910, Buzzard added over 23 feet (7.0 m) to the length of the cabin, making it 16 feet (4.9 m) by 42 feet (13 m). After purchasing the homestead, Buckner added a massive river-stone fireplace and chimney in 1911. The cabin has a stone and concrete floor, log walls, and a wood shake roof. The Buckner's used the cabin as a primary residence until 1924, when it became a guest house. The National Park Service renovated the cabin in 1980, and stabilized the structure in 1999. The cabin is listed on the National Register of Historic Places as the Buckner Cabin.
- The Buckner homestead's main residence was originally built in 1914 as a 12-foot (3.7 m) by 18-foot (5.5 m) summer sleeping cabin. The Buckner family added a 16-foot (4.9 m) by 18-foot (5.5 m) living room in 1915, and another bedroom and a large fireplace in 1921. A third bedroom and a kitchen were added in 1925. The National Park Service added a porch in 1983, and re-roofed the house 1975 and again in 1999. It is a wood-frame house on a stone and concrete foundation; the walls are weatherboard, and it has a metal roof.
- The Buckner homestead hay barn and workshop was built in 1949. It is a two-story building with a large hay loft and gable roof. The building's footprint measures 21 feet (6.4 m) by 24 feet (7.3 m). It is a wood-frame structure on a concrete foundation with weatherboard siding and a metal roof. The main entrance is a large wood-panel sliding door on the north side of the building.
- The Buckner's Milk House was built in 1916. It is a 6-foot (1.8 m) by 8-foot (2.4 m) one-story, wood-frame structure on a raised concrete foundation with an overhanging gable roof. The National Park Service rehabilitated the building in 1979.
- The "Delco House" provided electricity for the farm. Originally, built as a smokehouse in 1915, it was converted to house the Delco power generator in 1925. It is a one-story, wood-frame structure on a 4-foot (1.2 m) by 8-foot (2.4 m) concrete foundation. The building has weatherboard siding and a wooden shake roof.
- The farm's wood and harness shed was built in 1950. It is a one-story, log-frame structure on a concrete foundation with a wooden gabled roof. The building measure 12 feet (3.7 m) by 20 feet (6.1 m). The National Park Service replaced the shed roof in 1980, and accomplished addition preservation work in 2005.

Other buildings on the Buckner farm include a sleeping house, tool and equipment sheds, root cellar, chicken coops, outhouse, and a children's play house. The Buckner's swimming pool is included on the National Park Services inventory of structures, however, it is kept empty for safety reasons. Old farm equipment, like the Buckner's 1911 Hercules Stump Puller and several farm trucks, are also on display. The National Park Service maintains the Buckner's orchard, harvesting its apples every fall.
