= Lake Chelan National Recreation Area =

National recreation area in Chelan County

- IUCN category V (protected landscape/seascape)
- Location within Washington (state) Location within the United States
- Interactive map of Lake Chelan National Recreation Area
- Location: Chelan County, Washington, United States
- Nearest city: Chelan, Washington
- Coordinates: 48°19′19″N 120°40′42″W
- Area: 61,958 acres (250.74 km^{2})
- Established: October 2, 1968
- Visitors: 38,207 (in 2022)
- Governing body: National Park Service
- Website: Lake Chelan National Recreation Area

Lake Chelan National Recreation Area is a national recreation area located about 35 miles (56 km) south of the Canada–US border in Chelan County, Washington. It encompasses an area of 61,958 acres (25,074 ha) including the northern end of Lake Chelan and the surrounding area of the Stehekin Valley and the Stehekin River. The area is managed by the U.S. National Park Service as part of the North Cascades National Park Service Complex.

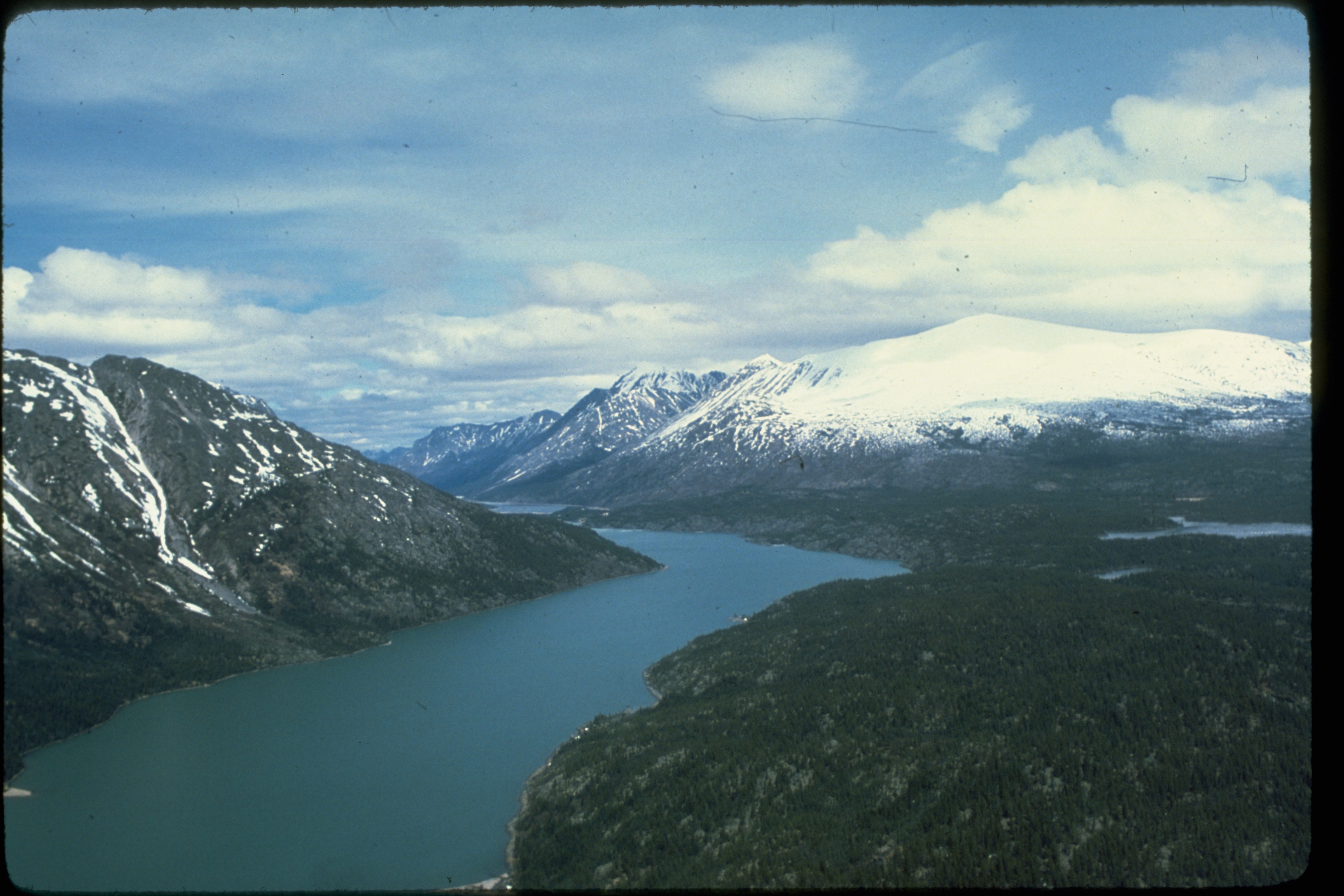
Lake Chelan

Lake Chelan NRA is adjacent to the North Cascades National Park South Unit. There are no roads that lead into Lake Chelan NRA. The recreation area and Stehekin, a small town in the park with fewer than 100 permanent residents, are accessible only by floatplane or passenger ferry from the south end of Lake Chelan near the town of Chelan, Washington. The area can also be accessed by hiking trails through the Cascade Range during the summer months. During the summer, an off-road bus service operated by the NPS carries weary hikers to the town from the Pacific Crest Trail.

Visitors to Lake Chelan NRA can get general information about the area at the Golden West Visitor Center located near the ferry landing. The Buckner Homestead Historic District, Purple Point-Stehekin Ranger Station House, and the one-room Stehekin School are in the Lake Chelan NRA. They are all listed on the National Register of Historic Places.

The recreational areas most notable place of interest is Lake Chelan, which is one of the deepest lakes in the US reaching a 1,500-foot depth, and spans over 50 miles. The lake brings in thousands of visitors to do anything from fishing, boating, hiking, or even camping, and it is one of the few ways to get to the remote town of Stehekin.

== Stehekin ==
The area of Stehekin got its name from the Salish speaking people who lived there and named it the Salishan word for "the way through". Stehekin received its name because it acts like a passageway for both humans and animals alike to the northern Cascade Mountains region.

== Recreational emphasis ==
While zoning this area for recreational use, the National Park Service had to factor in the residents that lived here year-round. Because of this, instead of becoming a site of preservation, they decided to make the primary focus one of recreation in order to not disrupt the lives of the residents. Due to these permanent residents living in what is now part of a national recreation area, the National Park Service doesn't have full control over it like other national parks. The state of Washington kept its authority over the area, and the National Park Service has proprietary rather than exclusive jurisdiction.

Visitors can either camp in designated campgrounds or at dispersed sites more than half a mile away from any trails and one mile away for a campground.

== See also ==
- Ecology of the North Cascades
