= Stehekin, Washington =

Unincorporated community in Washington, United States

Stehekin
- Unincorporated community
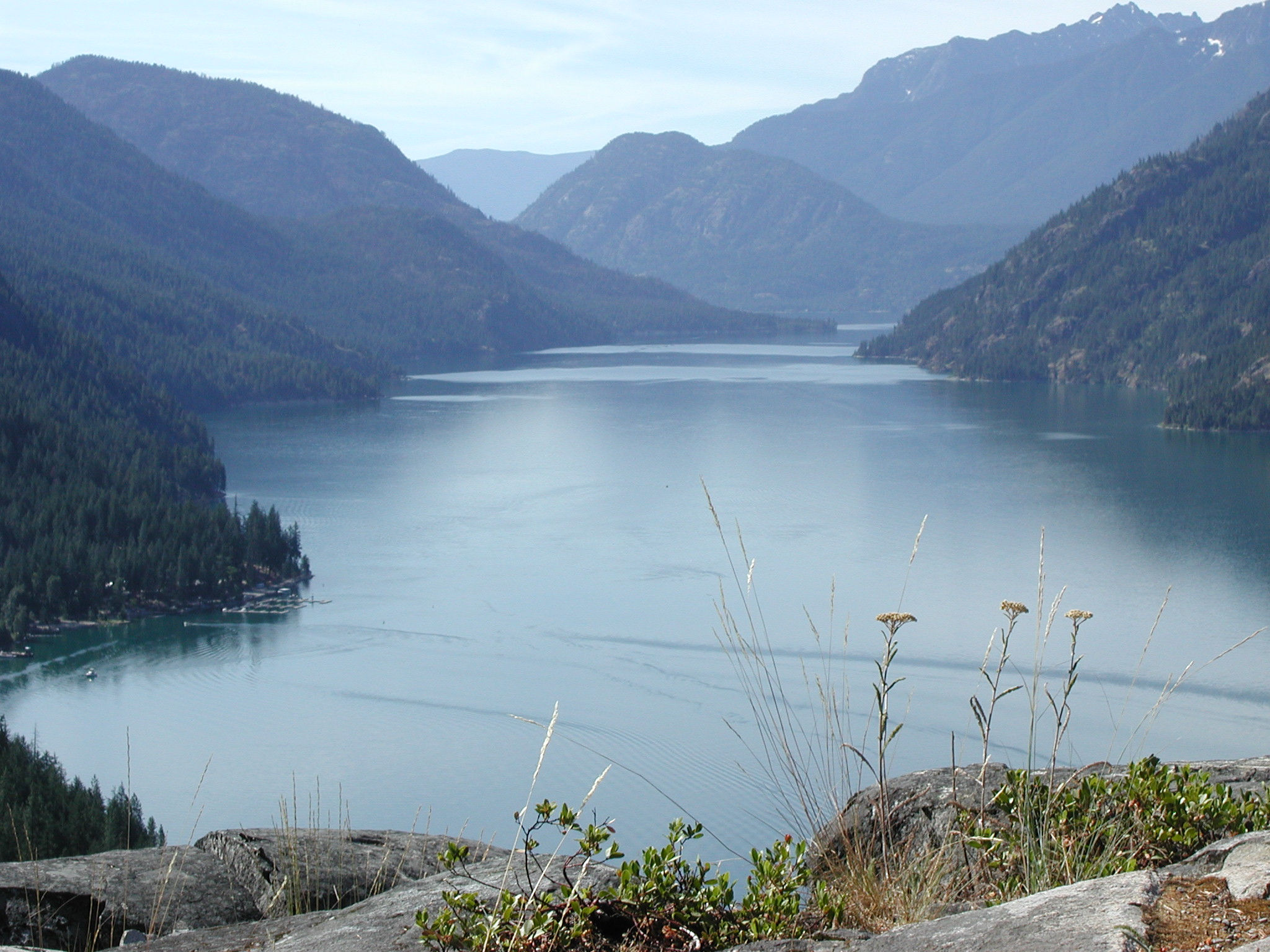
- View of Stehekin and the north end of Lake Chelan.

- Location within the state of Washington
- Coordinates: 48°18′34″N 120°39′19″W
- Country: United States
- State: Washington
- County: Chelan

Population (2024)
  - Total: 85 (year-round)
- Time zone: UTC-8 (Pacific (PST))
  - Summer (DST): UTC-7 (PDT)
- ZIP code: 98852
- Area code: 509

Stehekin /stəˈhiːkən/ is a small unincorporated community in Chelan County, Washington. The name "Stehekin" comes from a word in the Salishan language that means "the way through". Stehekin has 85 year-round residents, but vacationers and seasonal workers increase its population during the summer.

Stehekin is part of Wenatchee–East Wenatchee Metropolitan Statistical Area. Located at the northwest end of Lake Chelan, the town lies just south of the North Cascades National Park. Stehekin is within the Lake Chelan National Recreation Area, a unit administered by the National Park Service (NPS). The Glacier Peak Wilderness Area lies to the northwest of Stehekin.

== History ==
The upper end of Lake Chelan was part of a major east–west corridor for Native Americans for at least 9,000 years connecting communities on either side of the Cascade Range. In the 1800s, Native Americans in the Lake Chelan and Upper Skagit Valley referred to the pass between them as Stehekin meaning "the way through". Natives would store canoes at the head of the lake. White settlement began around 1875 when prospectors began searching for minerals in and around the Stehekin Valley. Mining activity increased in the 1880s with significant ore discoveries through 1891. A small gold rush occurred in the area.

Difficulty in accessing the community created problems for miners attempting to get their product to markets. Numerous proposals for wagon roads, railroads, and later vehicle highways were created in the late 19th and early 20th centuries, but none were brought to fruition and the village remains disconnected from the North American road and railroad networks. A road was built connecting the original dock on the south side of the Stehekin River to mining areas up the valley in the 1890s. This route was abandoned within a few years when a new dock was built on the north side of the river.

William Buzzard homesteaded and cleared a 160 acres (65 ha) area and planted a small garden in 1889. This was sold in 1911 to the Buckner family, who developed it into a small farm and orchard that they operated into the 1940s. A post office was established in Stehekin in 1892.

The Stehekin Valley Road was included in Washington's inventory of state highways during the first half of the 20th century before passing into the hands of Chelan County and later the federal government. The last extension of the road was in 1949, from which point mining interest stopped proposing extensions due to the high cost of construction and maintenance. Sections were abandoned after flood damage in 1995 and 2003.

Stehekin has experienced several forest fires that have endangered the town, including in 1993, 2006, and 2015. An evacuation order urging Stehekin residents to leave was issued in late July 2024 during the Pioneer Fire. A week after the evacuation order, most residents remained though a Red Cross shelter was established in Chelan. Firefighters prepared the town in advance of the encroaching flames, wrapping fire-resistant protective foil around several buildings, including the NPS cabin and several historical buildings. In case of a catastrophic necessity, the fire crews also built a floating dock on the lake to assist in a last-minute evacuation. Stehekin reopened in late August after the evacuation order was withdrawn. There were no reported injuries nor loss of any building in the community.

== Tourism ==
Stehekin is visited by hikers and bikers in the summer, and snowshoers and skiers in the winter, as well as photographers year-round. Sights and attractions in Stehekin include the Buckner Homestead Historic District, The Golden West Visitor Center, the Stehekin Pastry Company, the one-room Stehekin School, the 312-foot (95 m) Rainbow Falls, Harlequin Bridge, and the CCC-constructed National Park Service cabin at High Bridge. Trout and sockeye salmon are popular targets for fishing in Stehekin.

== Transportation ==
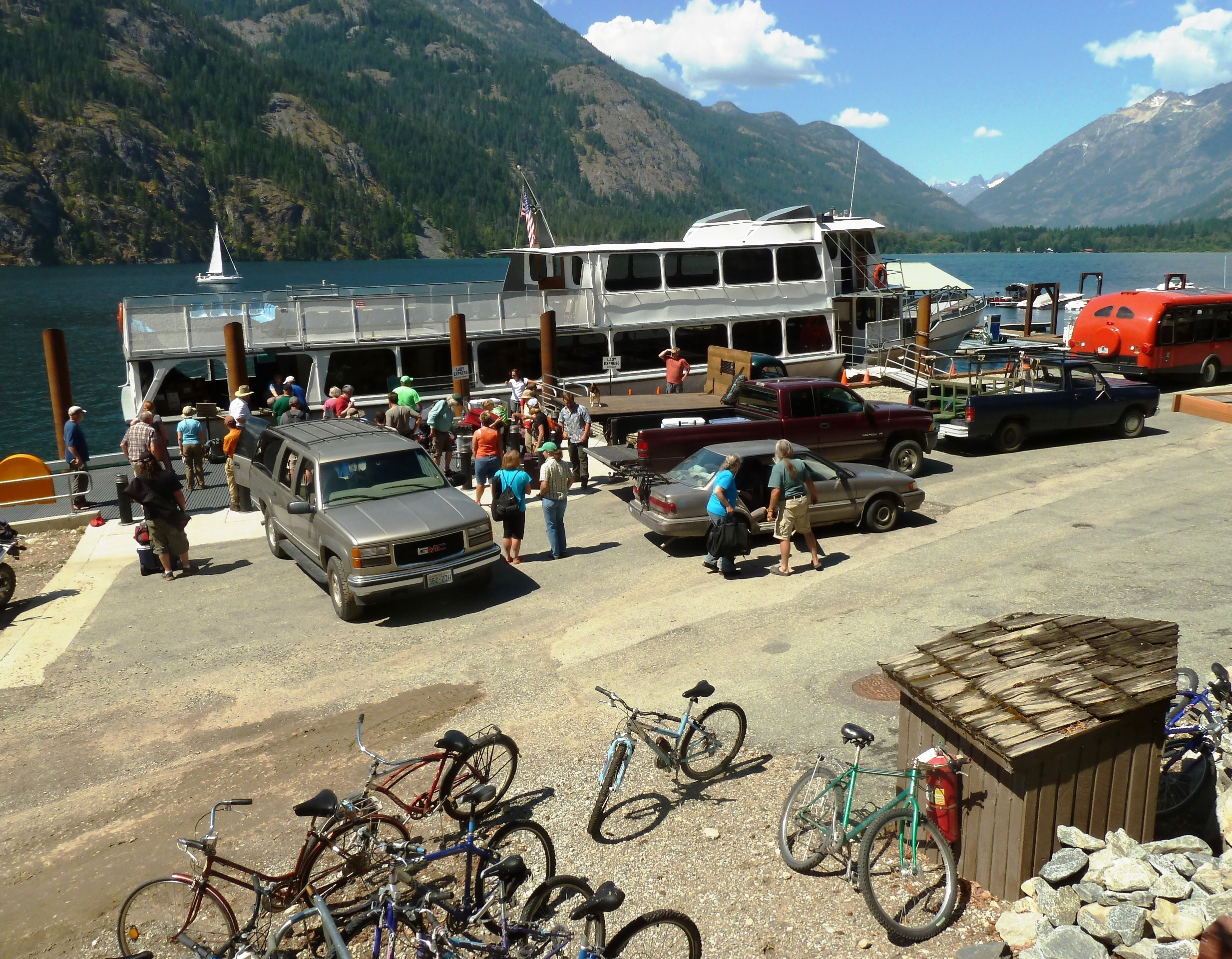
Ferry at Stehekin

There is no road access to Stehekin, although roughly 10 miles (16 km) of road exist in the Stehekin Valley. The town is accessible by passenger ferries operated by the Lake Chelan Boat Company, by private boat from Chelan, by foot over Cascade Pass, by floatplane, or by small aircraft that land on a turf airstrip open from June through September. Vehicles in Stehekin are barged up Lake Chelan. The Stehekin State Airport is noted by the Washington State Department of Transportation as being one of the state's most challenging. While only 1,230 ft (370 m) in elevation, there are mountains on the sides and trees at each end of the 2,630 ft (800 m) runway. The airport is often used as a base for firefighting, at which times it is closed to the public.

In addition to these means of access, visitors come to Stehekin by horseback and hiking. In 2003, much of the upper (northern) half of the Stehekin Valley Road was washed out by the nearby Stehekin River. Thus, access via Cascade Pass has become more difficult, adding as much as 10 miles (16 km) to the already strenuous trek. Stehekin is also accessible from Washington Pass via the Pacific Crest Trail (PCT). As well, the PCT can be used to access Stehekin from the Suiattle River Valley, although the hike is longer than that from Washington Pass.

A network of trails through the mountains east of Stehekin provide access by foot from the Methow Valley area. The Chelan Summit trail starts near the nexus of Grade Creek Road northwest of Chelan and provides a continuous trail all the way into Stehekin. The Lake Shore Trail, which leads into Stehekin from Prince Creek. The Lady of the Lake ferry services this trail head.

== Climate ==
Stehekin has a dry-summer continental climate (Köppen Dsb) with warm to hot summers and heavy winter snowfall. The precipitation pattern closely resembles a Mediterranean climate and using the lower 26 °F (−3 °C) isotherm for the coldest month, Stehekin may be described as a highly unusual mediterranean climate. Winter temperatures are much colder than those encountered on the windward side of the Cascades, but are still moderate compared to areas further east. The overall temperature span has ranged from 107 °F (42 °C) in summer to −18 °F (−28 °C) in winter. The coldest daily maximum measured was 0 °F (−18 °C) in December 1968. During the series of normals spanning from 1991 to 2020 the coldest annual maximum averaged a lot closer to the average with 19 °F (−7 °C). Summer nights can occasionally be very warm, with a record of 77 °F (25 °C) from July 1907, as well as a reading of 74 °F (23 °C) measured in 2015. In a normal year, the warmest low is 67 °F (19 °C).

Climate data for Stehekin, Washington (1991–2020 normals, extremes since 1906)
Month	Jan	Feb	Mar	Apr	May	Jun	Jul	Aug	Sep	Oct	Nov	Dec	Year
Record high °F (°C)	55 (13)	59 (15)	70 (21)	85 (29)	101 (38)	103 (39)	107 (42)	105 (41)	98 (37)	88 (31)	67 (19)	62 (17)	107 (42)
Mean maximum °F (°C)	42 (6)	48 (9)	59 (15)	74 (23)	86 (30)	92 (33)	99 (37)	98 (37)	89 (32)	72 (22)	52 (11)	42 (6)	100 (38)
Mean daily maximum °F (°C)	32.3 (0.2)	37.8 (3.2)	46.5 (8.1)	57.5 (14.2)	68.6 (20.3)	74.4 (23.6)	84.3 (29.1)	83.3 (28.5)	72.5 (22.5)	55.8 (13.2)	40.0 (4.4)	32.3 (0.2)	57.1 (13.9)
Daily mean °F (°C)	28.5 (−1.9)	31.9 (−0.1)	38.1 (3.4)	46.6 (8.1)	56.2 (13.4)	62.2 (16.8)	70.1 (21.2)	69.3 (20.7)	60.2 (15.7)	46.8 (8.2)	35.2 (1.8)	29.0 (−1.7)	47.8 (8.8)
Mean daily minimum °F (°C)	24.8 (−4.0)	26.0 (−3.3)	29.8 (−1.2)	35.8 (2.1)	43.8 (6.6)	49.9 (9.9)	55.9 (13.3)	55.2 (12.9)	47.8 (8.8)	37.8 (3.2)	30.4 (−0.9)	25.6 (−3.6)	38.6 (3.7)
Mean minimum °F (°C)	12 (−11)	15 (−9)	22 (−6)	28 (−2)	34 (1)	41 (5)	47 (8)	46 (8)	38 (3)	27 (−3)	21 (−6)	12 (−11)	8 (−13)
Record low °F (°C)	−18 (−28)	−16 (−27)	−5 (−21)	19 (−7)	25 (−4)	28 (−2)	36 (2)	30 (−1)	22 (−6)	16 (−9)	0 (−18)	−11 (−24)	−18 (−28)
Average precipitation inches (mm)	6.75 (171)	3.72 (94)	3.60 (91)	1.44 (37)	1.07 (27)	0.75 (19)	0.46 (12)	0.49 (12)	1.05 (27)	3.66 (93)	6.73 (171)	7.16 (182)	36.88 (936)
Average snowfall inches (cm)	41.4 (105)	18.5 (47)	9.1 (23)	0.2 (0.51)	0.0 (0.0)	0.0 (0.0)	0.0 (0.0)	0.0 (0.0)	0.0 (0.0)	0.2 (0.51)	9.7 (25)	50.6 (129)	129.7 (330.02)
Average extreme snow depth inches (cm)	36 (91)	33 (84)	24 (61)	6 (15)	0 (0)	0 (0)	0 (0)	0 (0)	0 (0)	0 (0)	6 (15)	27 (69)	41 (100)
Average precipitation days (≥ 0.01 in)	17	11	11	8	6	6	3	3	6	11	16	16	114
Average snowy days (≥ 0.01 in)	11	5	3	0	0	0	0	0	0	0	3	11	33
Source: NOAA

== Telephone service ==
Between March 15 and 28 of 2007, WeavTel, a telecommunications company based in Chelan, at the southern end of the lake, began normal operations of standard-delivery residential and business telephone service, joining Stehekin to the Washington State telephone grid after decades of isolation. With no cell phone reception, Stehekin had previously only been served by highly expensive satellite and radio telephones. Although the move was not widely accepted amongst residents, business owners found benefit in having normal telephone service.

The WeavTel service is currently limited to the Lower Stehekin Valley, around Stehekin Landing and the village proper, but WeavTel has applied for permits to extend the service into the Upper Valley using underground fiber-optic cables. The move was made possible under federal and state grants that provided support for any telecommunications company willing to extend service to rural areas. Although most other areas of North Central Washington have standard service, areas outside the city of Wenatchee have benefited from the grants as well. One of the first test phone calls was placed from Stehekin's Silver Bay Resort.

== See also ==
- Holden Village
