= Green Lake (North Cascades National Park) =

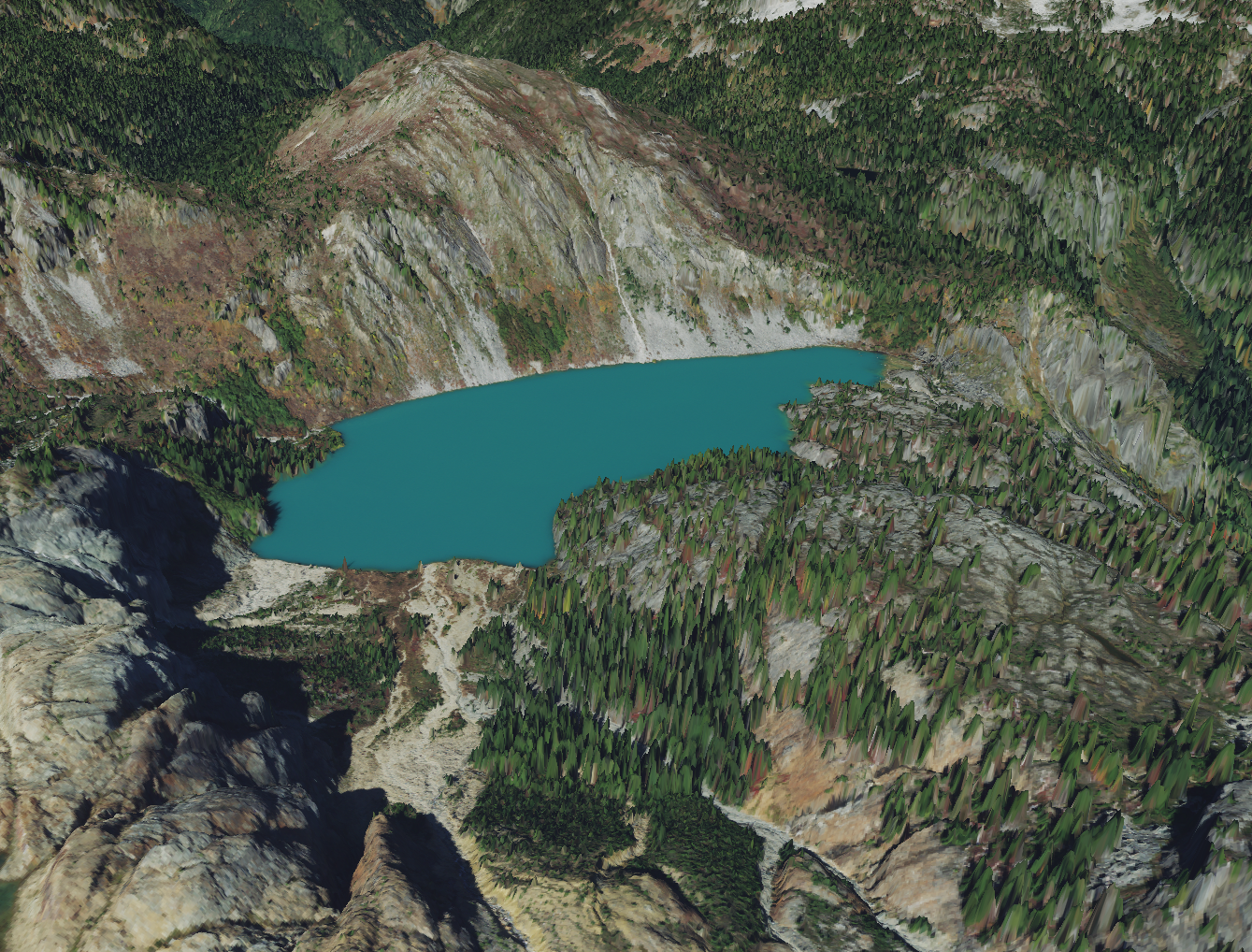
- A render of Green Lake

- Location within Washington (state) Location within the United States
- Location: North Cascades National Park, Whatcom County, Washington, United States
- Coordinates: 48°41′29″N 121°30′15″W
- Lake type: Cirque Lake
- Primary outflows: Bacon Creek
- Basin countries: United States
- Max. length: .65 mi (1.05 km)
- Max. width: .25 mi (0.40 km)
- Surface elevation: 4,265 ft (1,300 m)

Green Lake is located in North Cascades National Park, in the U. S. state of Washington. Situated 1.5 mi (2.4 km) northeast of Bacon Peak, Green Lake receives some runoff from Green Lake Glacier which empties into the lake after plunging 375 ft (114 m) over Bacon Lake Falls. Another series of waterfalls lie below Green Lake and are known as Green Lake Falls which drop another 979 ft (298 m).

The lake was named by a Forest Service officer for its coloration, which comes from glacial flour.
