= Electric Butte =

Mountain in Washington (state), United States

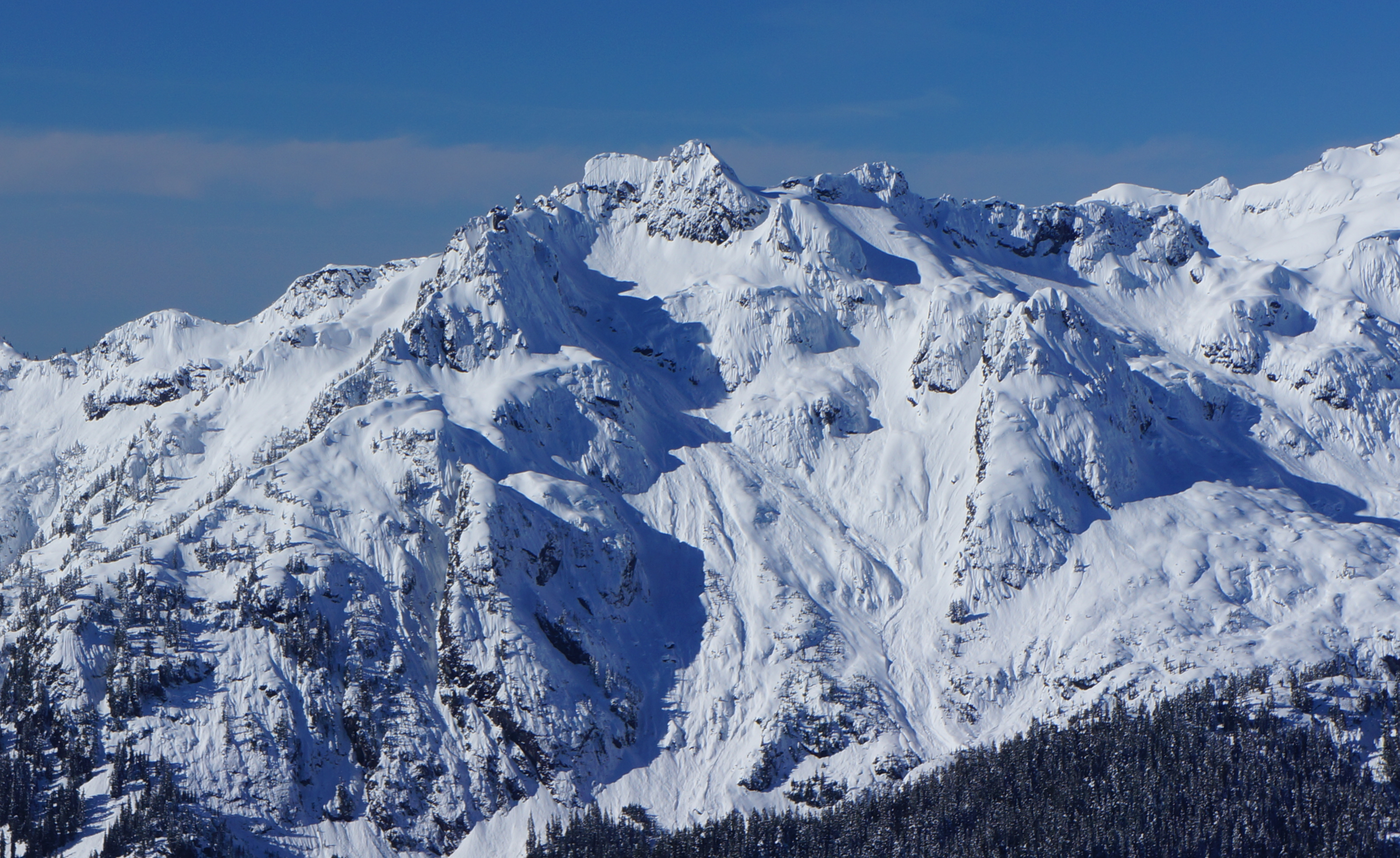
- Electric Butte seen from Oakes Peak

Highest point
- Elevation: 6,400+ ft (1,950+ m)
- Prominence: 720 ft (220 m)
- Parent peak: Bacon Peak 7061 ft (2152 m)
- Coordinates: 48°38′51″N 121°29′00″W

Geography
- Location within Washington (state) Location within the United States
- Country: United States
- State: Washington
- County: Whatcom
- Protected area: North Cascades National Park
- Parent range: North Cascades; Cascade Range
- Topo map: USGS Damnation Peak

Electric Butte is an unofficially named 6,400-foot (2,000-metre) mountain summit near the western edge of the North Cascades, in Whatcom County of Washington state. It is located north of Marblemount and Logger Butte, within North Cascades National Park. The nearest higher neighbor is Canadian Bacon, 1.44 mi (2.32 km) to the north, with Bacon Peak, 2.01 mi (3.23 km) to the northwest. Precipitation runoff from Electric Butte drains into tributaries of the Skagit River.

== Climate ==
Electric Butte is located in the marine west coast climate zone of western North America. Weather fronts originating in the Pacific Ocean travel east toward the Cascade Mountains. As fronts approach the North Cascades, they are forced upward by the peaks of the Cascade Range, causing them to drop their moisture in the form of rain or snow onto the Cascades. As a result, the west side of the North Cascades experiences high precipitation, especially during the winter months in the form of snowfall. Because of maritime influence, snow tends to be wet and heavy, resulting in avalanche danger. During winter months, weather is usually cloudy, but due to high pressure systems over the Pacific Ocean that intensify during summer months, there is often little or no cloud cover during the summer. Due to its temperate climate and proximity to the Pacific Ocean, areas west of the Cascade Crest very rarely experience temperatures below 0 °F (−18 °C) or above 80 °F (27 °C).>

== Geology ==
The North Cascades features some of the most rugged topography in the Cascade Range with craggy peaks, ridges, and deep glacial valleys. Geological events occurring many years ago created the diverse topography and drastic elevation changes over the Cascade Range leading to the various climate differences.

The history of the formation of the Cascade Mountains dates back millions of years ago to the late Eocene Epoch. With the North American Plate overriding the Pacific Plate, episodes of volcanic igneous activity persisted. In addition, small fragments of the oceanic and continental lithosphere called terranes created the North Cascades about 50 million years ago.

During the Pleistocene period dating back over two million years ago, glaciation advancing and retreating repeatedly scoured the landscape leaving deposits of rock debris. The U-shaped cross section of the river valleys is a result of recent glaciation. Uplift and faulting in combination with glaciation have been the dominant processes which have created the tall peaks and deep valleys of the North Cascades area.

== Gallery ==
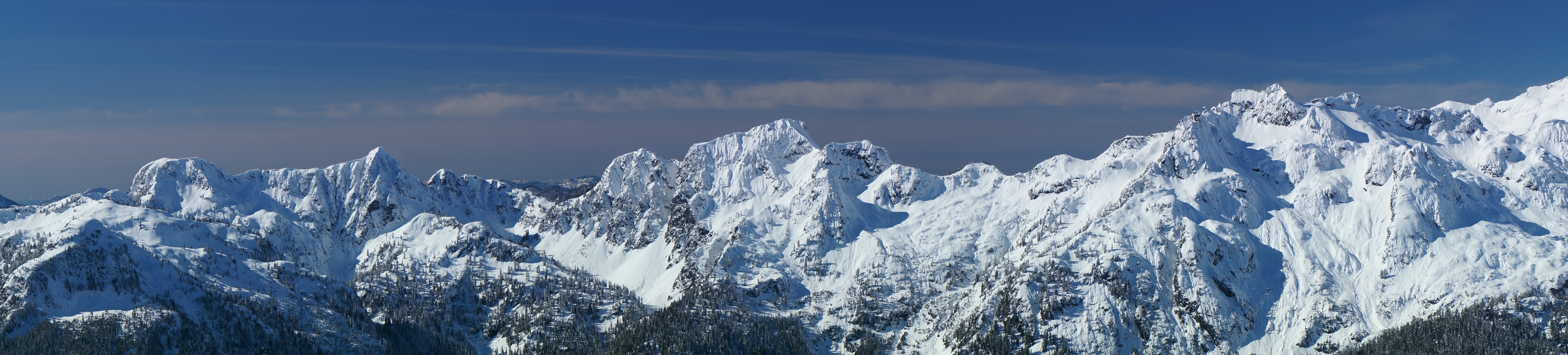
Panorama from Oakes Peak with Diobsud Buttes to left, Logger Butte centered, and Electric Butte to right

== See also ==
- Geology of the Pacific Northwest
