= Big Devil Peak =

Mountain in Washington (state), United States

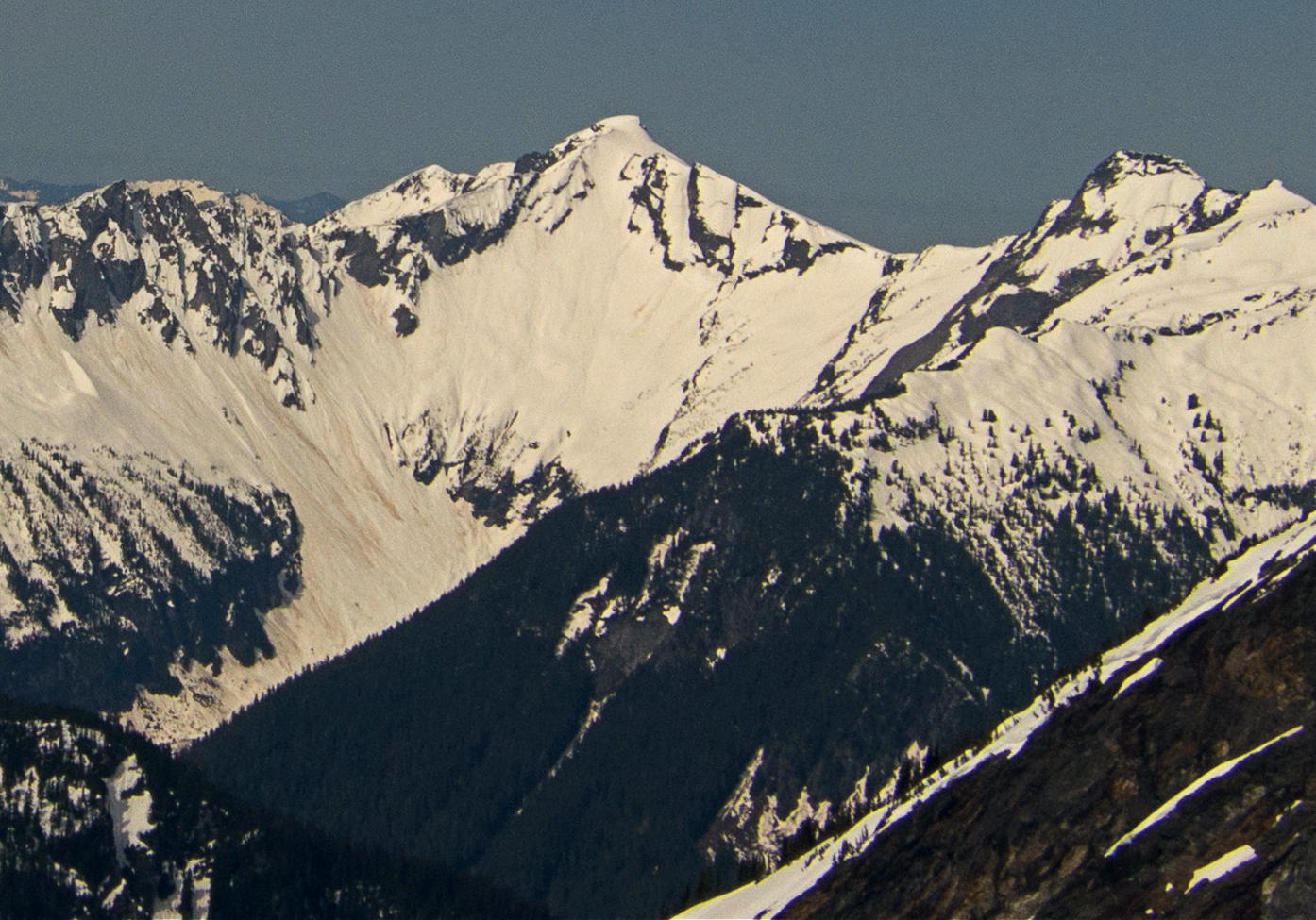
- Big Devil Peak from the northeast

Highest point
- Elevation: 7,055 ft (2,150 m)
- Prominence: 1,655 ft (504 m)
- Isolation: 5.32 mi (8.56 km)
- Coordinates: 48°36′16″N 121°17′37″W

Geography
- Location within Washington (state) Location within the United States
- Interactive map of Big Devil Peak
- Country: United States
- State: Washington
- County: Skagit
- Protected area: North Cascades National Park
- Parent range: North Cascades; Cascade Range
- Topo map: USGS Big Devil Peak

Geology
- Rock type(s): Gneiss, Schist

Climbing
- First ascent: 1963 J. Haggerty, J. Roper
- Easiest route: Climbing YDS 3

Big Devil Peak is a 7,055-foot-elevation (2,150-meter) mountain summit located in North Cascades National Park in Skagit County of Washington state. The peak lies midway between Marblemount and Newhalem and can be seen from the North Cascades Highway at the road pullout for Big Devil Falls. The peak rises 6,600+ feet above the valley floor at this viewing location in the valley. Big Devil is the highest peak of Teebone Ridge, and other peaks on this ridge include Little Devil Peak, Fallen Angel, and The Trapezoid. Precipitation runoff from the mountain drains into tributaries of the Skagit River.

== Climate ==
Big Devil Peak is located in the marine west coast climate zone of western North America. Most weather fronts originate in the Pacific Ocean, and travel northeast toward the Cascade Mountains. As fronts approach the North Cascades, they are forced upward by the peaks of the Cascade Range (orographic lift), causing them to drop their moisture in the form of rain or snowfall onto the Cascades. As a result, the west side of the North Cascades experiences high precipitation, especially during the winter months in the form of snowfall. Because of maritime influence, snow tends to be wet and heavy, resulting in high avalanche danger. During winter months, weather is usually cloudy, but due to high pressure systems over the Pacific Ocean that intensify during summer months, there is often little or no cloud cover during the summer.

== Geology ==
The North Cascades features some of the most rugged topography in the Cascade Range with craggy peaks, spires, ridges, and deep glacial valleys. Geological events occurring many years ago created the diverse topography and drastic elevation changes over the Cascade Range leading to the various climate differences.

The history of the formation of the Cascade Mountains dates back millions of years ago to the late Eocene Epoch. With the North American Plate overriding the Pacific Plate, episodes of volcanic igneous activity persisted. In addition, small fragments of the oceanic and continental lithosphere called terranes created the North Cascades about 50 million years ago.

During the Pleistocene period dating back over two million years ago, glaciation advancing and retreating repeatedly scoured the landscape leaving deposits of rock debris. The U-shaped cross section of the river valleys is a result of recent glaciation. Uplift and faulting in combination with glaciation have been the dominant processes which have created the tall peaks and deep valleys of the North Cascades area.

== Gallery ==
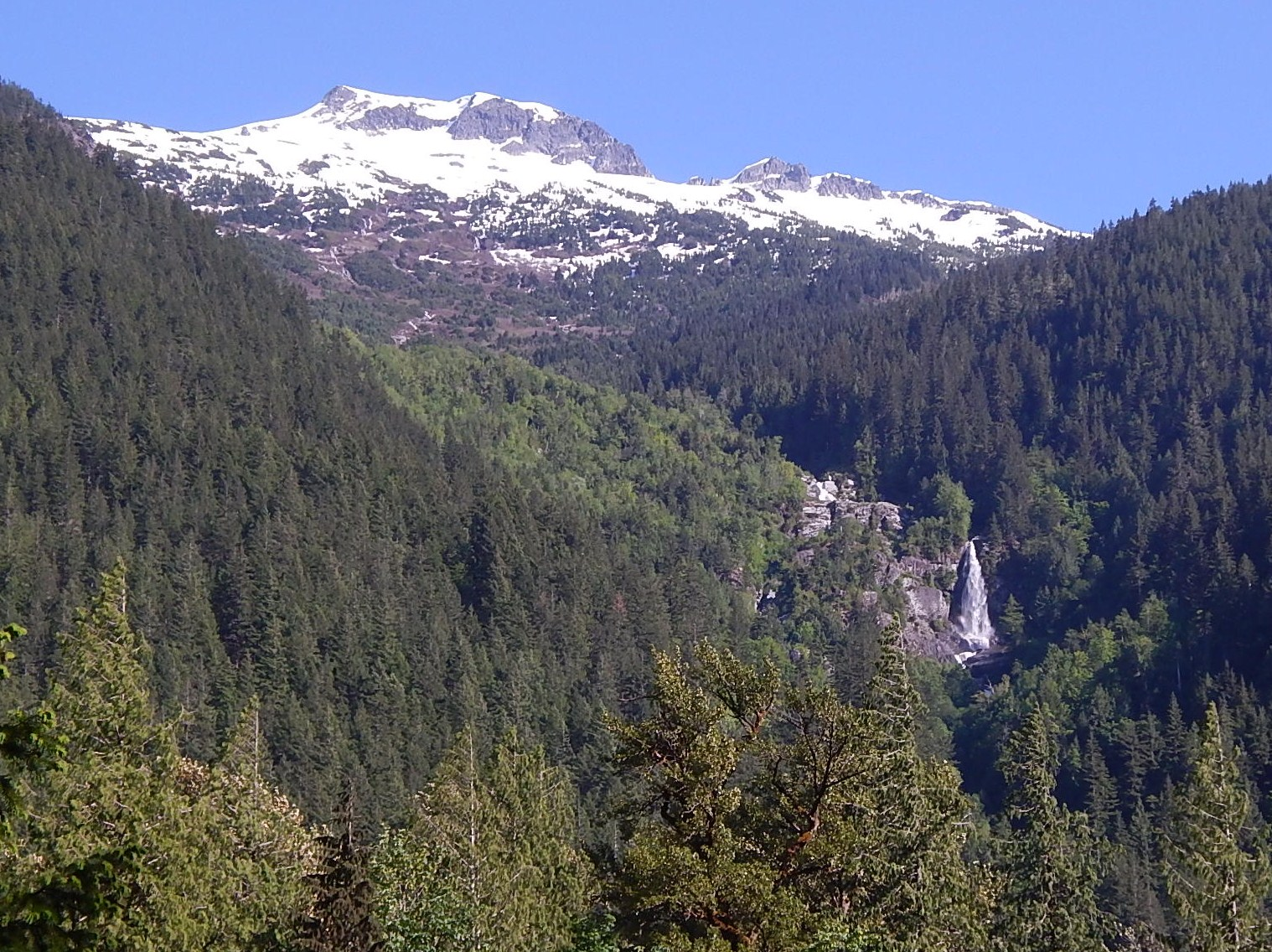
Big Devil Peak and Big Devil Falls seen from Highway 20

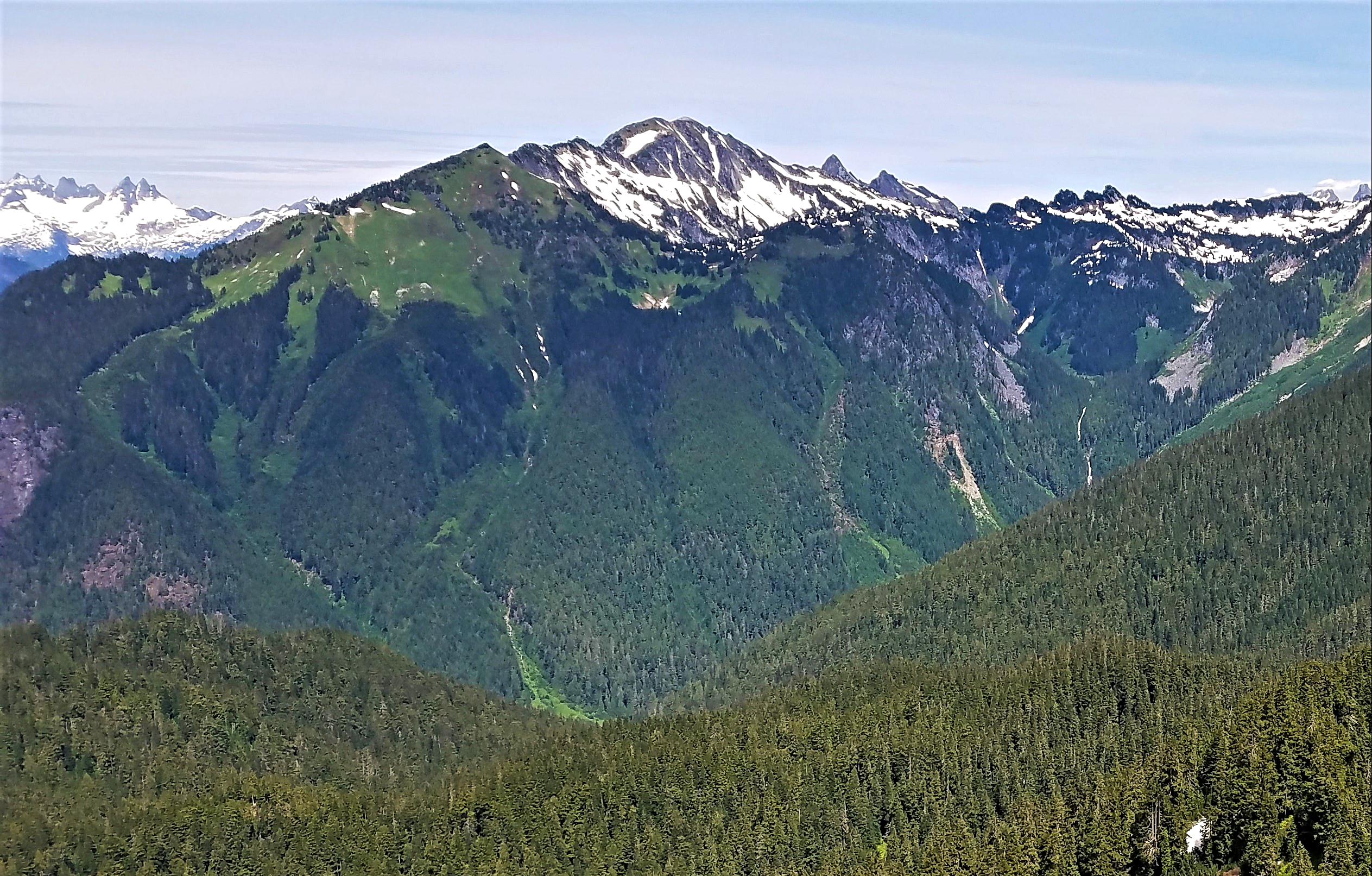
SSW aspect of Big Devil seen from the Lookout Mountain area

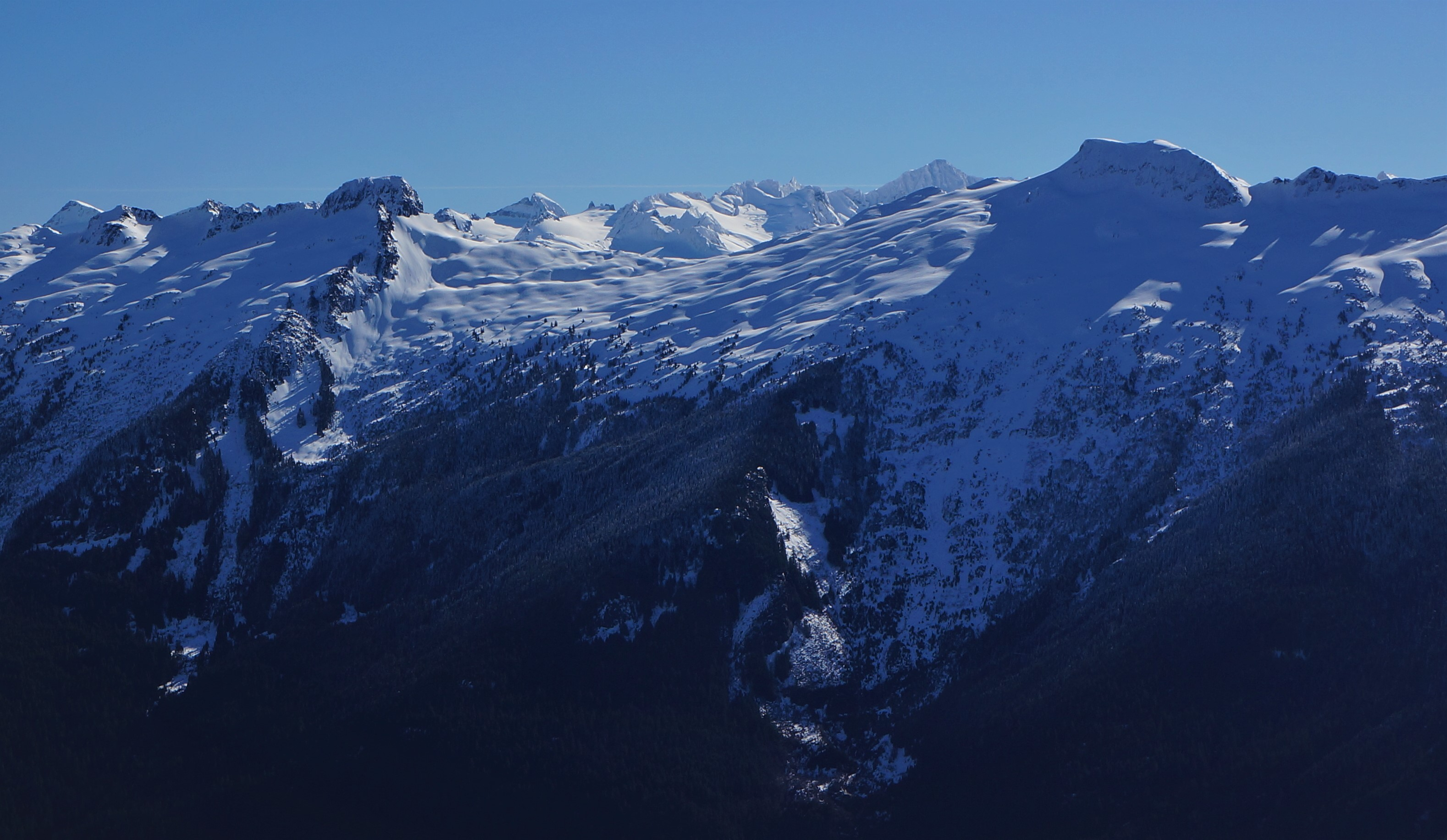
The Trapezoid (left) and Big Devil Peak (right) from the northwest

== See also ==
- Geography of the North Cascades
