= Noisy Creek Glacier =

Glacier in the state of Washington

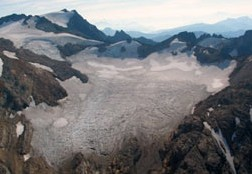
- Noisy Creek Glacier

- Location within Washington (state)
- Type: Cirque glacier
- Location: Whatcom County, Washington, U.S.
- Coordinates: 48°40′21″N 121°31′42″W
- Length: .55 mi (0.89 km)
- Terminus: Icefall
- Status: Retreating

Noisy Creek Glacier is in North Cascades National Park in the U.S. state of Washington, .50-mile (0.80 km) northwest of Bacon Peak. Noisy Creek Glacier has retreated and left behind a series of small proglacial lakes. Noisy Creek Glacier descends from 6,300 to 5,500 ft (1,900 to 1,700 m) and had an area of .58 km^{2} in 1993. A ridge separates Noisy Creek Glacier from Green Lake Glacier to the east. The National Park Service is currently studying Noisy Creek Glacier as part of their glacier monitoring project. Between 1993 (when monitoring began), and 2013 the glacier had lost ~8 m of thickness.

== See also ==
- List of glaciers in the United States
