= Backus-Marblemount Ranger Station House No. 1009 =

- U.S. National Register of Historic Places
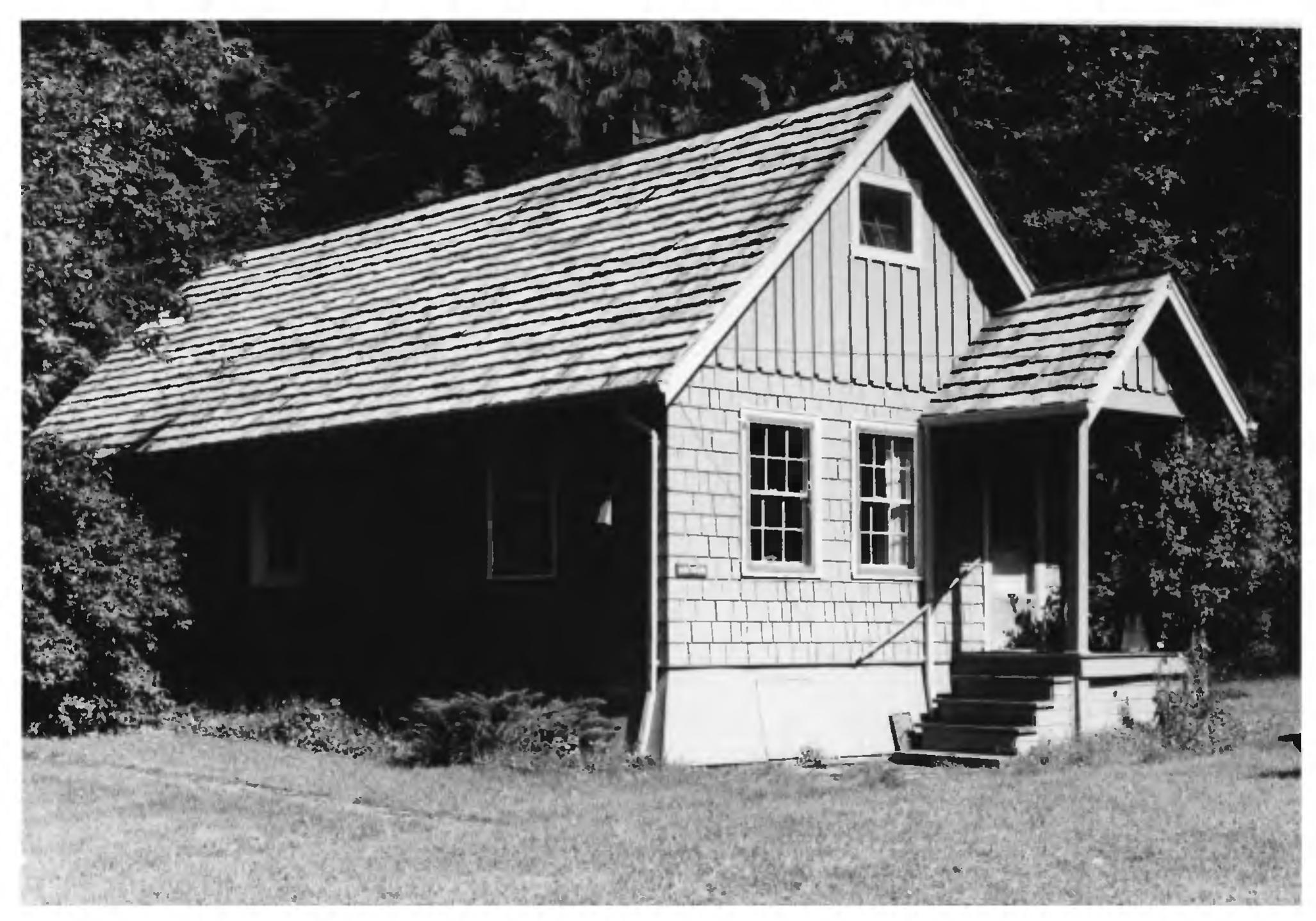
- Backus-Marblemount Ranger Station House No. 1009

- Location within Washington (state)
- Nearest city: Marblemount, Washington
- Coordinates: 48°32′26″N 121°26′55″W
- Area: less than one acre
- Built: 1932
- MPS: North Cascades National Park Service Complex MRA
- NRHP reference No.: 88003462
- Added to NRHP: February 10, 1989

The Backus-Marblemount Ranger Station House No. 1009 is in Mount Baker-Snoqualmie National Forest, in the U.S. state of Washington. Constructed by the United States Forest Service in 1932, the ranger station was inherited by the National Park Service when North Cascades National Park was dedicated in 1968. The ranger station was placed on the National Register of Historic Places in 1989.

Backus-Marblemount Ranger Station House No. 1009 is a wood-framed and -sided structure, 1 1/2-story tall that is 19 ft (5.8 m) wide and 40 ft (12 m) long. A small portico is at the entrance on the east side and the gable ends are sheathed in board and batten style siding. Backus-Marblemount Ranger Station House No. 1009 is less than 50 yd (46 m) southeast of Backus-Marblemount Ranger Station House No. 1010.
