= Canadian Bacon (mountain) =

Mountain in Washington (state), United States

Highest point
- Elevation: 6,600+ feet (2,010+ m)
- Prominence: 320 ft (100 m)
- Coordinates: 48°40′00″N 121°29′44″W

Geography
- Location: Whatcom County, Washington, U.S.
- Parent range: North Cascades
- Topo map: USGS Damnation Peak

Canadian Bacon, elevation 6,600+ feet (2,010+ m), is a peak in the Cascade Range in Washington state. This summit in North Cascades National Park has not been officially named by the U.S. Board on Geographic Names. It is 1.1 miles (1.8 km) east of Bacon Peak.

== Nearby peaks ==
- Electric Butte
- Mount Watson
- Logger Butte
- Bacon Peak
- Mount Despair
