= Backus-Marblemount Ranger Station House No. 1010 =

- U.S. National Register of Historic Places
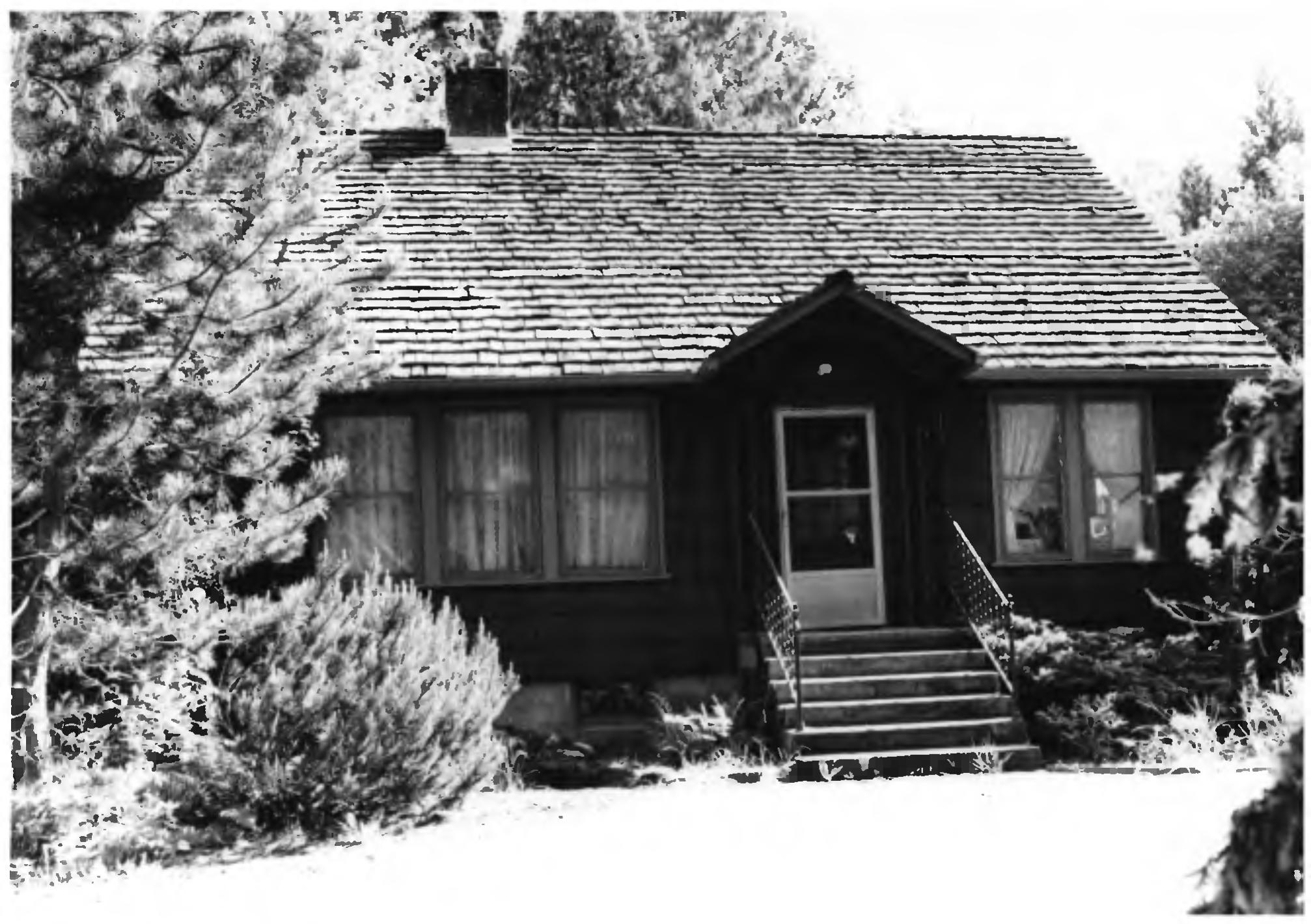
- Backus-Marblemount Ranger Station House No. 1010

- Location within Washington (state)
- Nearest city: Marblemount, Washington
- Coordinates: 48°32′27″N 121°26′57″W
- Area: less than one acre
- Built: 1933
- MPS: North Cascades National Park Service Complex MRA
- NRHP reference No.: 88003463
- Added to NRHP: February 10, 1989

The Backus-Marblemount Ranger Station House No. 1010 is in Mount Baker-Snoqualmie National Forest, in the U.S. state of Washington. Constructed by the United States Forest Service in 1933, the ranger station was inherited by the National Park Service when North Cascades National Park was dedicated in 1968. The ranger station was placed on the National Register of Historic Places in 1989.

Backus-Marblemount Ranger Station House No. 1010 is a wood framed and sided structure, one-and-a-half story tall that is 28 ft (8.5 m) wide at front and 34 ft (10 m) deep. The front entrance has a small, "gable-roofed entrance portico with arched stickwork in pediment, supported by wrought iron posts," while the north entrance also had a small gable supported by a king post truss. The gable ends to the east and west are sheathed in board and batten style siding. Backus-Marblemount Ranger Station House No. 1010 is less than 50 yd (46 m) northwest of Backus-Marblemount Ranger Station House No. 1009.
