= Canadian bacon (disambiguation) =

Canadian bacon is the American name for a form of back bacon that is cured, smoked and fully cooked, trimmed into cylindrical medallions, and thickly sliced.

Canadian bacon may also refer to:

- Canadian Bacon, a 1995 comedy film
- Canadian Bacon (mountain), a mountain in the U.S. state of Washington
- Peameal bacon, a type of Canadian bacon originating in Ontario, Canada
- Bacon, the product referred to as "bacon" in Canada
