= Green Lake Falls =

Waterfall in Washington (state), United States

- Interactive map of Green Lake Falls
- Location: Whatcom County, Washington
- Coordinates: 48°41′34″N 121°29′28″W
- Type: Tiered
- Total height: 979 ft (298 m)
- Number of drops: 3
- Longest drop: 500 ft (150 m)
- Total width: 150 ft (46 m)
- Average flow rate: 250 cu ft/s (7.1 m^{3}/s)
- World height ranking: 287

Green Lake Falls is a large, very difficult to access waterfall located a short distance below the outlet of remote Green Lake, in North Cascades National Park, Whatcom County, Washington. It is 979 feet (298 m) high & averages 150 feet (46 m) wide and flows year-round. It has several tiers, including a 300-foot (91 m) slide and a 500-foot (152 m) plunge.

There is another 175-foot (53 m) drop about a fifth of a mile upstream, and if this was included the total height would be close to 1,260 feet (380 m). Above that is Green Lake itself, which is fed by several large, glacial streams originating from the Green Lake Glacier. The largest one contains unofficially named Bacon Lake Falls.

== See also ==
- List of waterfalls
