= Watson Glacier =

Glacier in the state of Washington

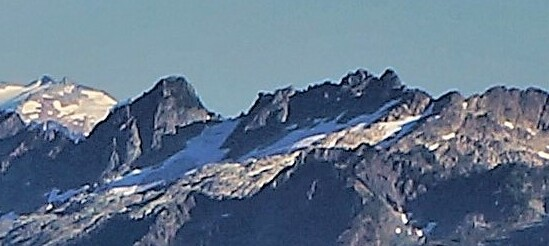
- Watson Glacier on the north slope of Mount Watson

- Location within Washington (state)
- Type: Mountain glacier
- Location: Whatcom County, Washington, U.S.
- Coordinates: 48°39′22″N 121°34′55″W
- Length: 1,150 ft (350 m)
- Terminus: Barren
- Status: Retreating

Watson Glacier is in Snoqualmie National Forest in the U.S. state of Washington, on the north slope of Mount Watson. Watson Glacier retreated 430 ft (130 m) between 1950 and 2007 and is now only 1,150 ft (350 m) in length. Watson Glacier descends from 6,000 to 5,700 ft (1,800 to 1,700 m).

== See also ==
- List of glaciers in the United States
