= Diobsud Creek Glacier =

Glacier in the state of Washington

- Location within Washington (state)
- Type: Alpine glacier
- Location: Whatcom County, Washington, U.S.
- Coordinates: 48°39′49″N 121°31′13″W
- Length: .80 mi (1.29 km)
- Terminus: Barren rock/icefall
- Status: Retreating

Diobsud Creek Glacier is in North Cascades National Park in the U.S. state of Washington and is on the east slopes of Bacon Peak. Diobsud Creek Glacier has a shallow gradient, descending to the east from 7,000 to 6,000 ft (2,100 to 1,800 m) for a distance of nearly 1 mi (1.6 km). The ridge is an arête which separates Diobsud Creek Glacier from Green Lake Glacier to the north.

== See also ==
- List of glaciers in the United States
