= Mount Watson (Washington) =

Mountain in Washington (state), United States

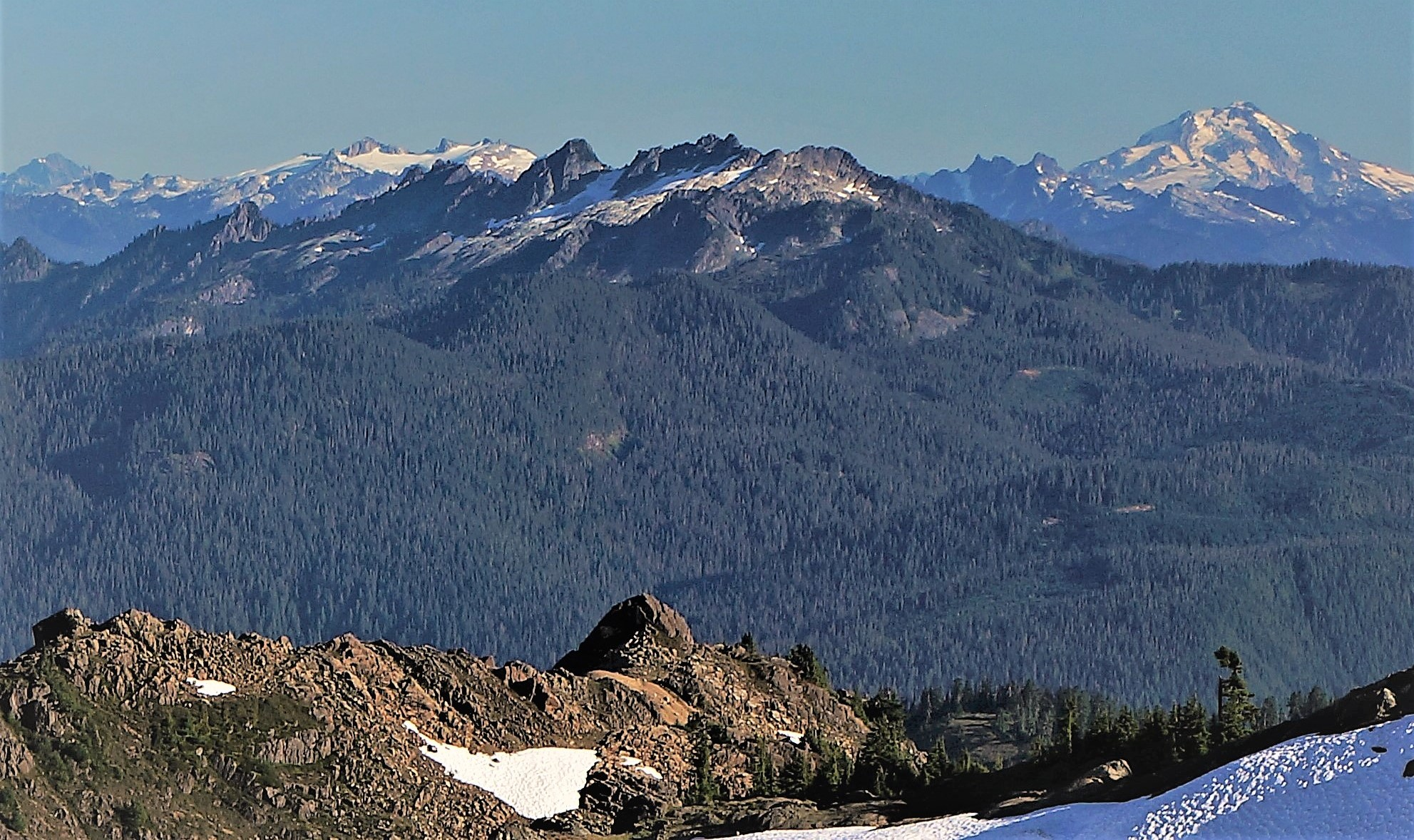
- Northwest aspect, centered

Highest point
- Elevation: 6,220 ft (1,896 m)
- Prominence: 1,300 ft (400 m)
- Parent peak: Bacon Peak (7,070 ft)
- Isolation: 2.30 mi (3.70 km)
- Coordinates: 48°39′20″N 121°34′37″W

Geography
- Location within Washington (state) Location within the United States
- Interactive map of Mount Watson
- Location: Whatcom County, Washington, U.S.
- Parent range: Cascade Range; North Cascades; Skagit Range
- Topo map: USGS Bacon Peak

Geology
- Rock age: Early Cretaceous
- Rock type: Greenschist

Climbing
- Easiest route: scrambling

Mount Watson is a 6,220-foot-elevation (1,900-meter) summit located in the North Cascades, in Whatcom County of Washington state.

== Description ==
Mount Watson is the highest point in the Noisy-Diobsud Wilderness, and is set on land managed by Mount Baker-Snoqualmie National Forest. Precipitation runoff from Mount Watson and meltwater from the Watson Glacier on the north slope drains into tributaries of the Skagit River. Topographic relief is significant as the summit rises nearly 2,800 feet (850 meters) above the head of Watson Creek in one mile. The nearest higher neighbor is Bacon Peak, 2.6 mi (4.2 km) to the east, and the nearest town is Concrete, Washington, 11 mi (18 km) to the southwest. This geographical feature's name has been reported in print since at least 1917, and was officially adopted by the U.S. Board on Geographic Names.

== Climate ==
Mount Watson is located in the marine west coast climate zone of western North America. Most weather fronts originate in the Pacific Ocean, and travel east toward the Cascade Mountains. As fronts approach the North Cascades, they are forced upward by the peaks of the Cascade Range, causing them to drop their moisture in the form of rain or snowfall onto the Cascades (Orographic lift). As a result, the west side of the North Cascades experiences high precipitation, especially during the winter months in the form of snowfall. Because of maritime influence, snow tends to be wet and heavy, resulting in avalanche danger. Due to its temperate climate and proximity to the Pacific Ocean, areas west of the Cascade Crest very rarely experience temperatures below 0 °F (−18 °C) or above 80 °F (27 °C). During winter months, weather is usually cloudy, but due to high pressure systems over the Pacific Ocean that intensify during summer months, there is often little or no cloud cover during the summer.

== Geology ==
The North Cascades features some of the most rugged topography in the Cascade Range with craggy peaks, ridges, and deep glacial valleys. Geological events occurring many years ago created the diverse topography and drastic elevation changes over the Cascade Range leading to the various climate differences. These climate differences lead to vegetation variety defining the ecoregions in this area.

The history of the formation of the Cascade Mountains dates back millions of years ago to the late Eocene Epoch. With the North American Plate overriding the Pacific Plate, episodes of volcanic igneous activity persisted. In addition, small fragments of the oceanic and continental lithosphere called terranes created the North Cascades about 50 million years ago.

During the Pleistocene period dating back over two million years ago, glaciation advancing and retreating repeatedly scoured the landscape leaving deposits of rock debris. The U-shaped cross section of the river valleys is a result of recent glaciation. Uplift and faulting in combination with glaciation have been the dominant processes which have created the tall peaks and deep valleys of the North Cascades area.

== Gallery ==
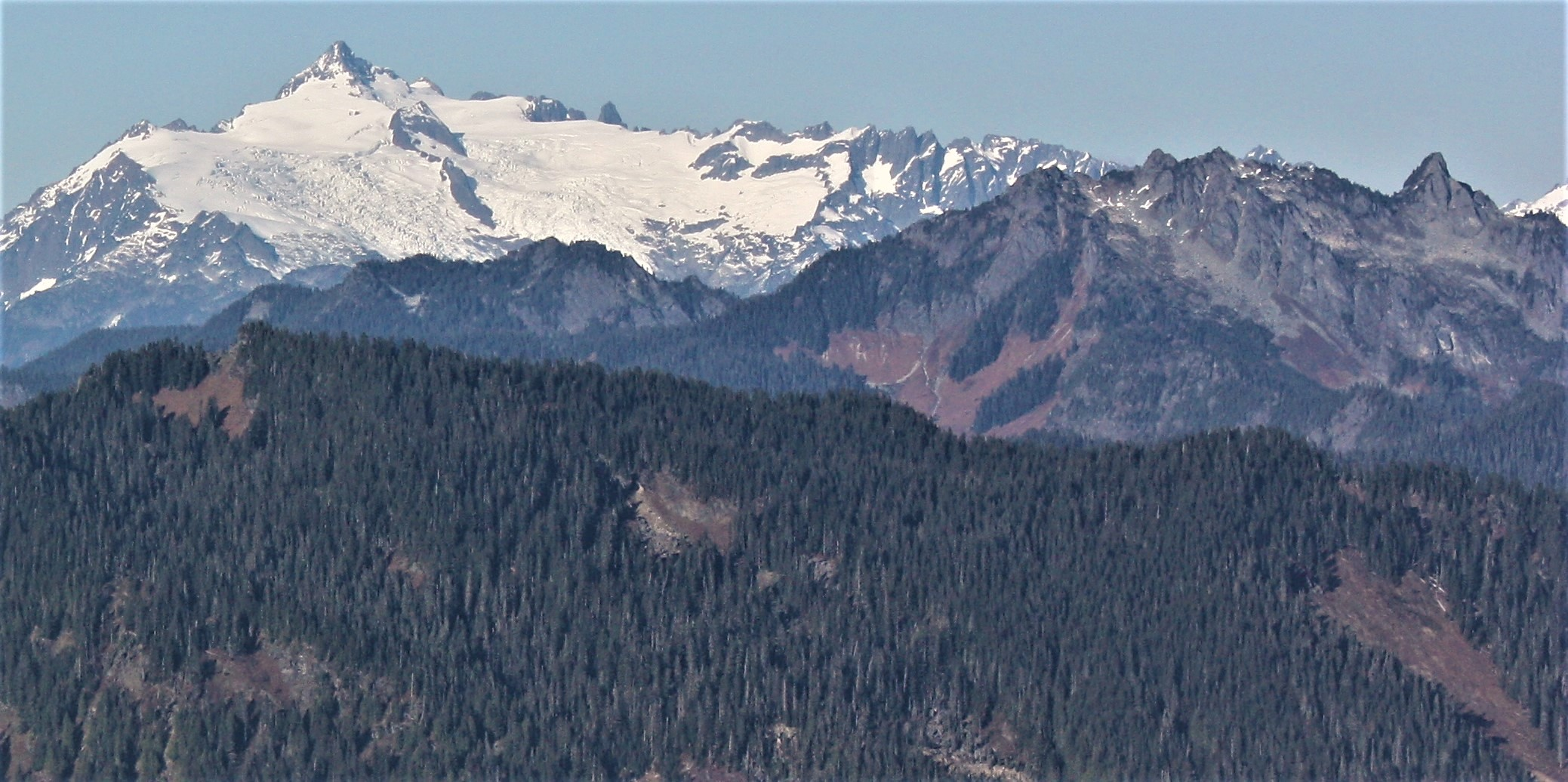
Mt. Shuksan (left) and Mt. Watson (right) seen from the south at Sauk Mountain

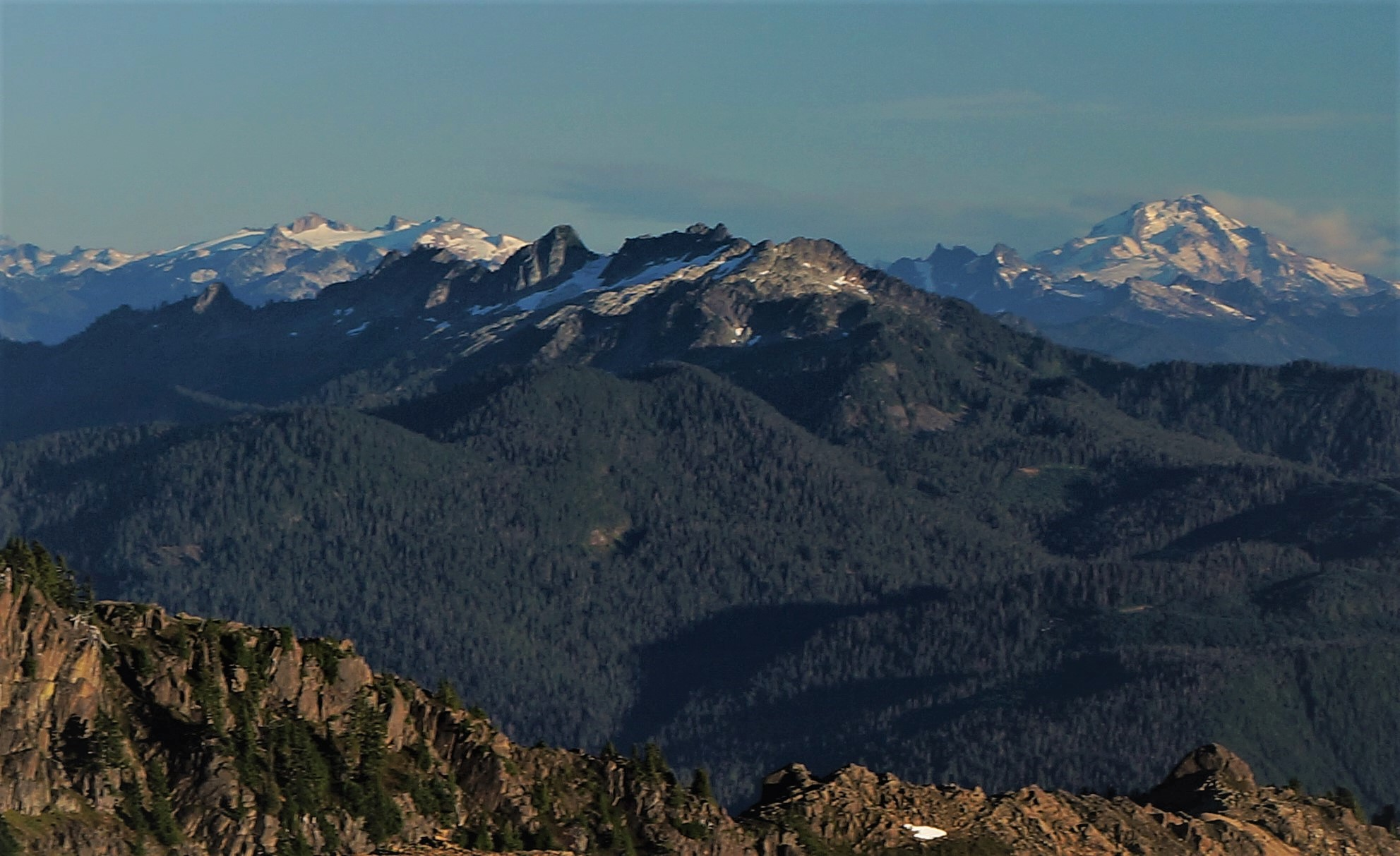
Northwest aspect of Mount Watson centered.
Glacier Peak distant right. Snowking distant left.

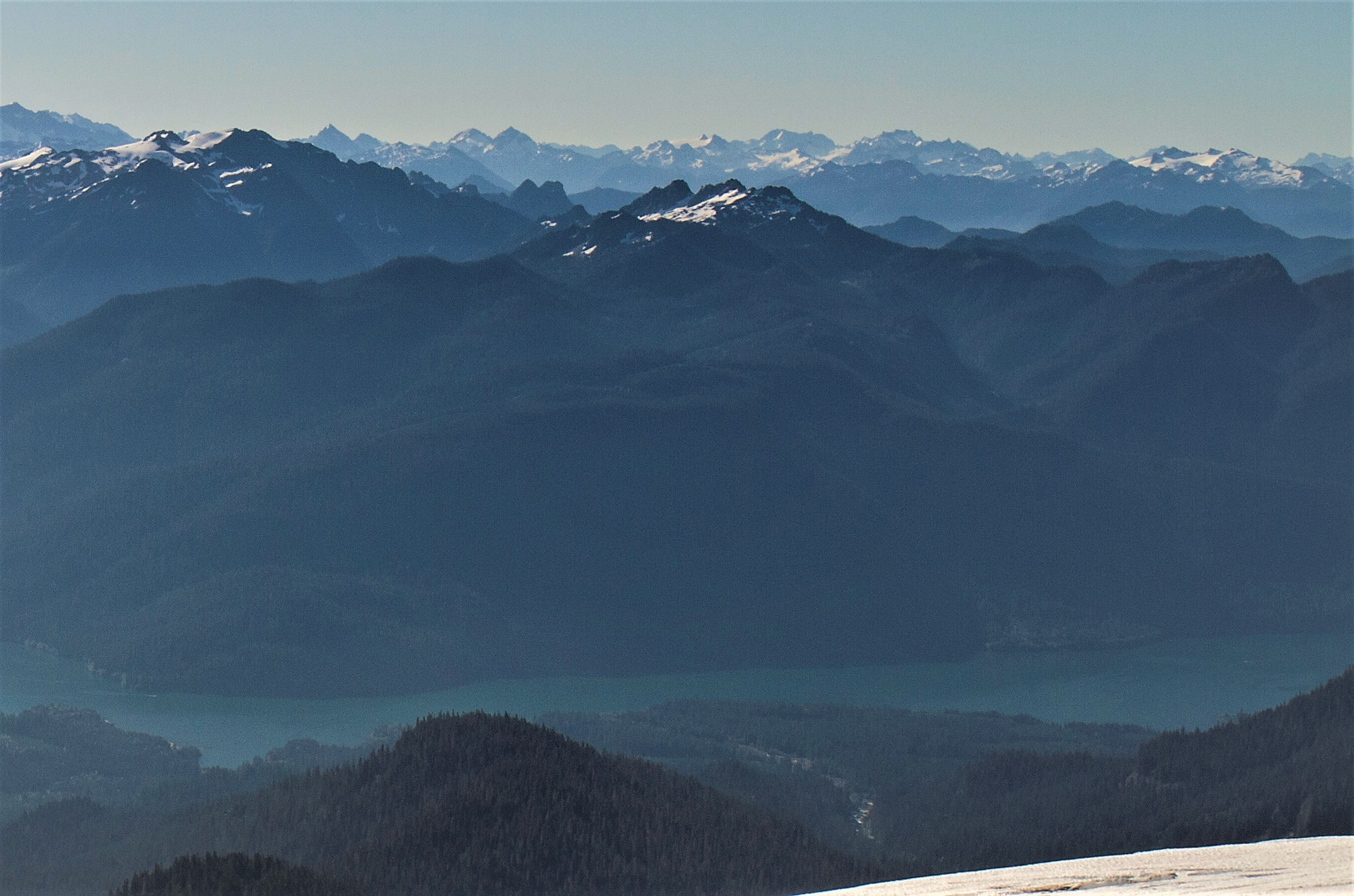
Mount Watson (centered) seen from the slopes of Mount Baker. Bacon Peak to left, Baker Lake at bottom of frame.

== See also ==
- Geography of the North Cascades
