= Little Devil Peak =

Mountain in Skagit County, Washington, United States

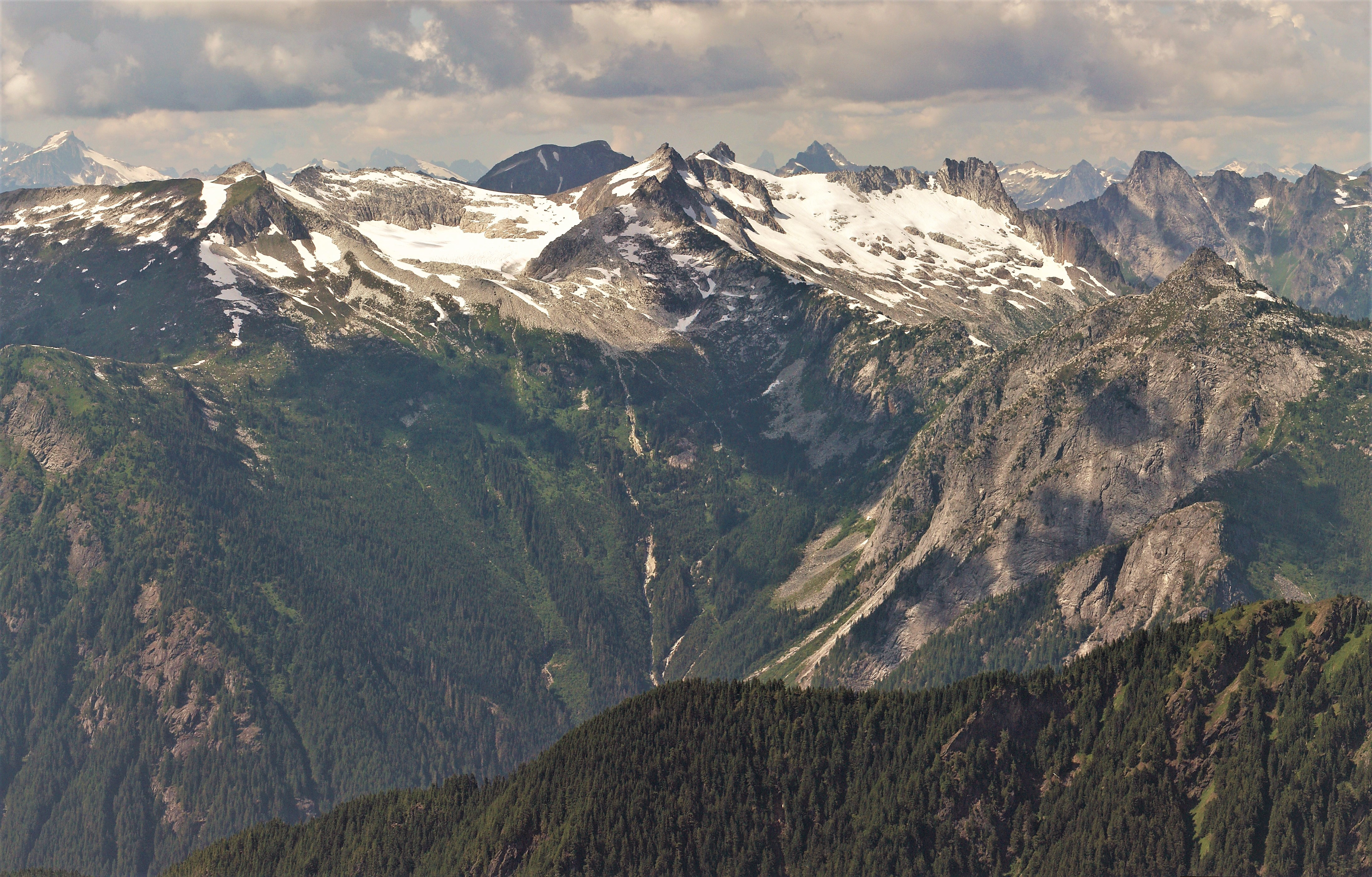
- Southeast aspect, seen from Hidden Lake Peaks

Highest point
- Elevation: 6,985 ft (2,129 m)
- Prominence: 1,024 ft (312 m)
- Parent peak: Big Devil Peak (7,055 ft)
- Isolation: 2.25 mi (3.62 km)
- Coordinates: 48°34′35″N 121°16′06″W

Geography
- Location within Washington (state) Location within the United States
- Interactive map of Little Devil Peak
- Location: North Cascades National Park; Skagit County, Washington
- Parent range: North Cascades; Cascade Range
- Topo map: USGS Big Devil Peak

Geology
- Rock type(s): schist, gneissic tonalite

Climbing
- First ascent: USGS, date unknown
- Easiest route: class 3

Little Devil Peak is a 6,985-foot-elevation (2,129 m) mountain summit located in Skagit County of Washington state. It is set within North Cascades National Park and Stephen Mather Wilderness, where it is situated 3.1 miles northeast of Lookout Mountain. Little Devil is the second-highest peak of Teebone Ridge, and other peaks on this ridge include line parent Big Devil Peak, Fallen Angel, and The Trapezoid. Precipitation runoff from the mountain drains into tributaries of the Skagit River. Like many North Cascades peaks, it is more notable for its large, steep rise above local terrain than for its absolute elevation. Topographic relief is significant as the south aspect rises 5,400 feet (1,600 meters) above Marble Creek in three miles, and the east aspect rises 4,200 feet (1,300 meters) above Newhalem Creek in approximately 1.5 mile.

== Climate ==
Little Devil Peak is located in the marine west coast climate zone of western North America. Most weather fronts originate in the Pacific Ocean, and travel east toward the Cascade Mountains. As fronts approach the North Cascades, they are forced upward by the peaks of the Cascade Range, causing them to drop their moisture in the form of rain or snowfall onto the Cascades (Orographic lift). As a result, the west side of the North Cascades experiences high precipitation, especially during the winter months in the form of snowfall. Because of maritime influence, snow tends to be wet and heavy, resulting in high avalanche danger. This climate supports a small glacier and glacierets on Little Devil's slopes. During winter months, weather is usually cloudy, but due to high pressure systems over the Pacific Ocean that intensify during summer months, there is often little or no cloud cover during the summer.

== Geology ==
The North Cascades features some of the most rugged topography in the Cascade Range with craggy peaks, spires, ridges, and deep glacial valleys. Geological events occurring many years ago created the diverse topography and drastic elevation changes over the Cascade Range leading to the various climate differences.

The history of the formation of the Cascade Mountains dates back millions of years ago to the late Eocene Epoch. With the North American Plate overriding the Pacific Plate, episodes of volcanic igneous activity persisted. In addition, small fragments of the oceanic and continental lithosphere called terranes created the North Cascades about 50 million years ago.

During the Pleistocene period dating back over two million years ago, glaciation advancing and retreating repeatedly scoured the landscape leaving deposits of rock debris. The U-shaped cross section of the river valleys is a result of recent glaciation. Uplift and faulting in combination with glaciation have been the dominant processes which have created the tall peaks and deep valleys of the North Cascades area.

== Gallery ==
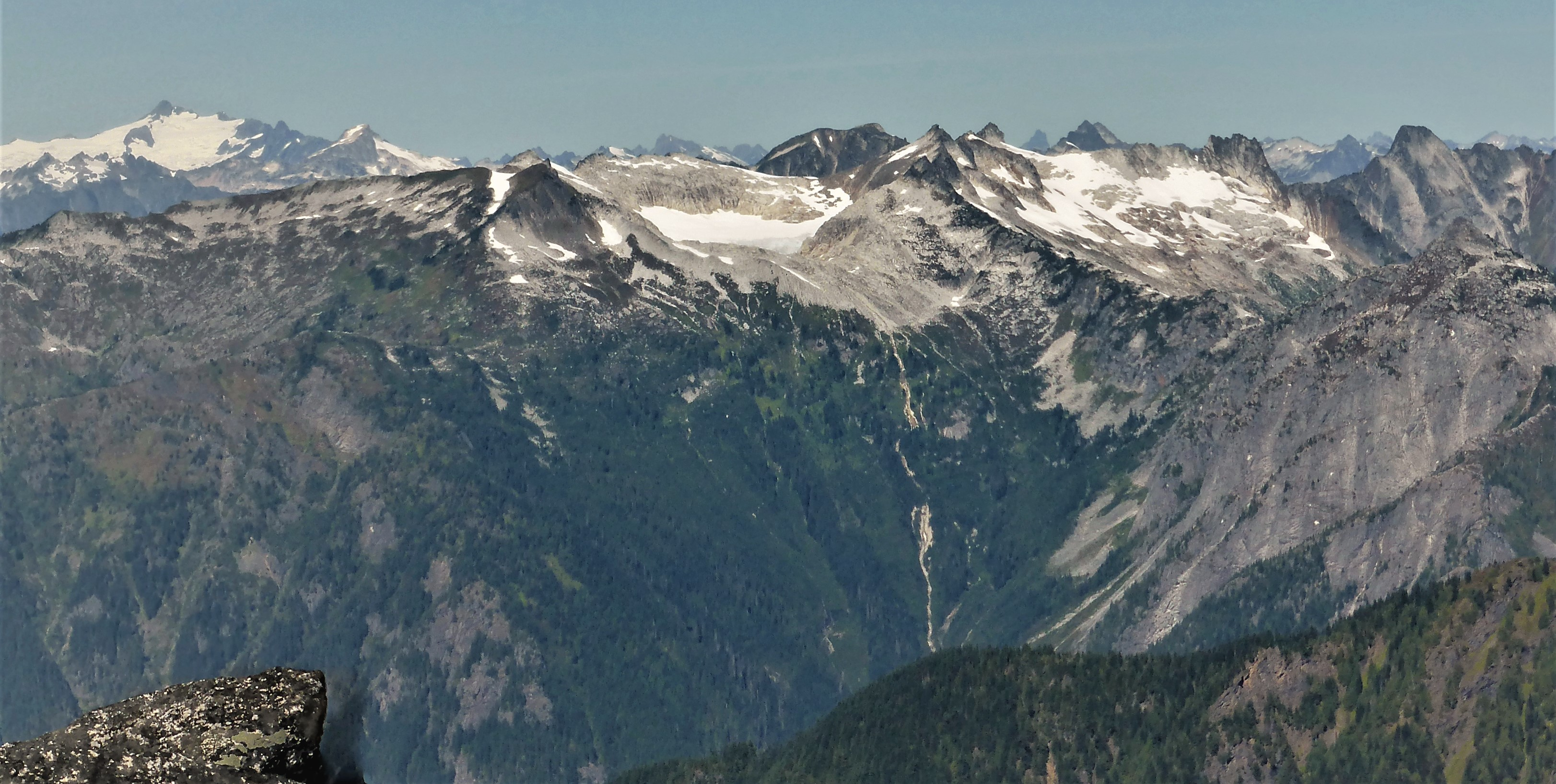
Little Devil Peak (right of center). Mount Shuksan in upper left corner, The Trapezoid in upper right corner.
