= Logger Butte =

Mountain in Washington (state), United States

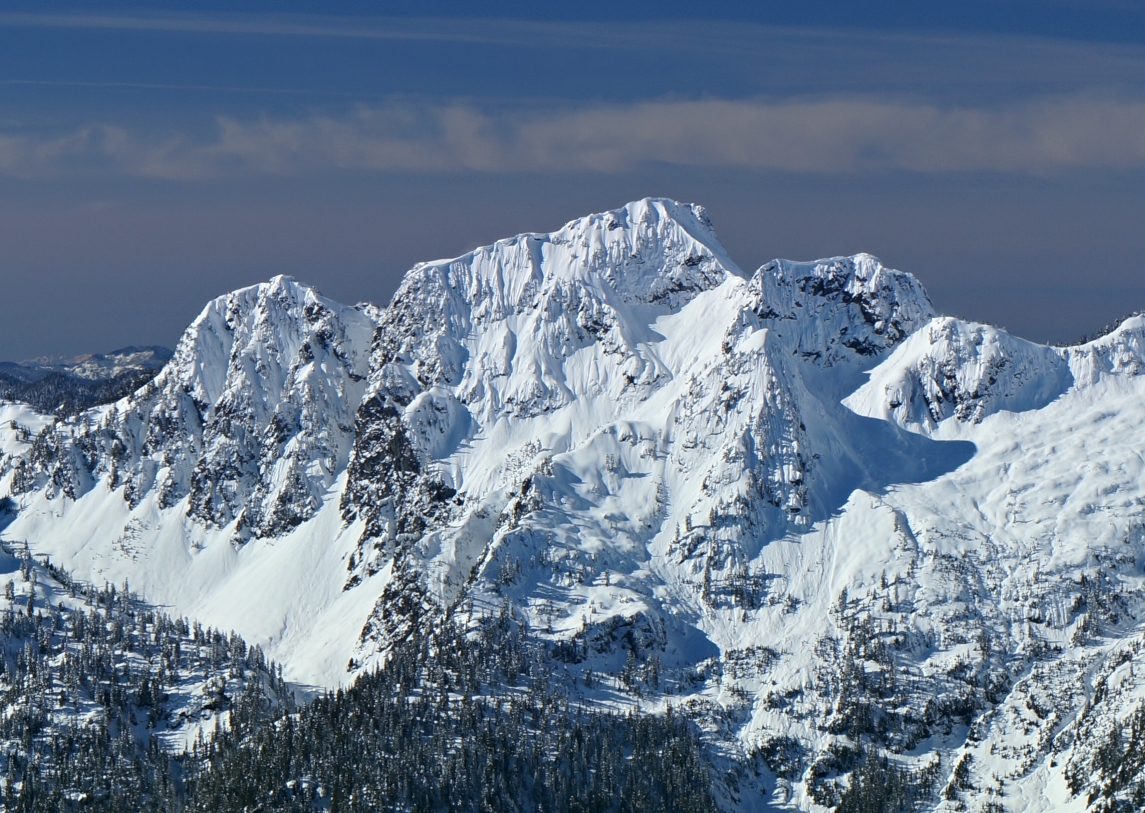
- Logger Butte seen from Oakes Peak

Highest point
- Elevation: 6,160 ft (1,878 m)
- Prominence: 720 ft (219 m)
- Parent peak: Electric Butte
- Isolation: 1.09 mi (1.75 km)
- Coordinates: 48°37′54″N 121°28′58″W

Geography
- Location within Washington (state) Location within the United States
- Country: United States
- State: Washington
- County: Skagit
- Protected area: North Cascades National Park; Noisy-Diobsud Wilderness
- Parent range: North Cascades; Cascade Range
- Topo map: USGS Damnation Peak

Logger Butte is a 6,160-foot (1,878-metre) mountain summit near the western edge of the North Cascades, in Skagit County of Washington state. It is located north of Marblemount and Diobsud Buttes, on the shared boundary of North Cascades National Park and the Noisy-Diobsud Wilderness. The nearest higher peak is Electric Butte, 1.0 mi (1.6 km) to the north. Precipitation runoff from Logger Butte drains into tributaries of the Skagit River.

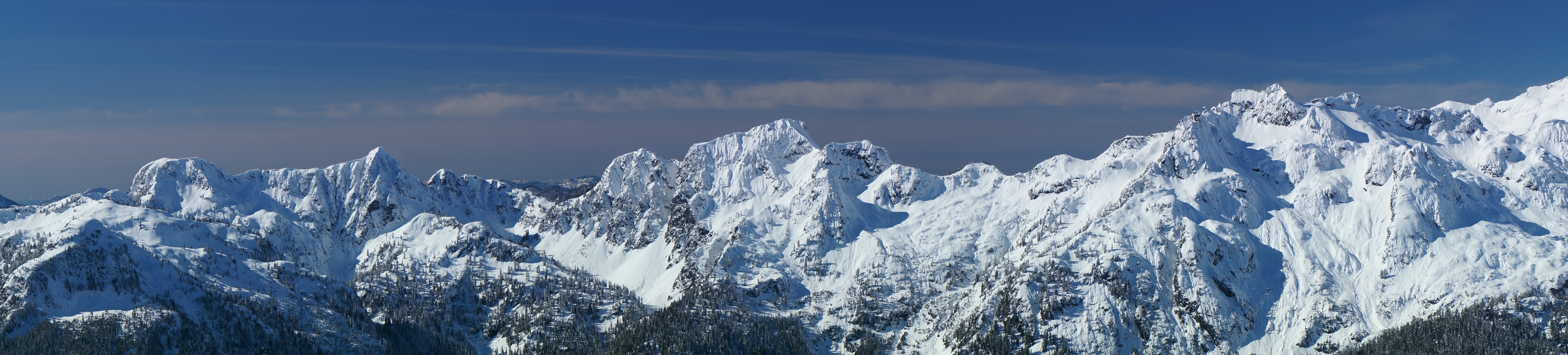
Panorama from Oakes Peak with Logger centered, Diobsud Buttes to left, and Electric Butte to right

== Climate ==
Logger Butte is located in the marine west coast climate zone of western North America. Weather fronts originating in the Pacific Ocean move northeast toward the Cascade Mountains. As fronts approach the North Cascades, they are forced upward by the peaks of the Cascade Range (orographic lift), causing them to drop their moisture in the form of rain or snowfall onto the Cascades. As a result, the west side of the North Cascades experiences high precipitation, especially during the winter months in the form of snowfall. Because of maritime influence, snow tends to be wet and heavy, resulting in high avalanche danger. During winter months, weather is usually cloudy, but due to high pressure systems over the Pacific Ocean that intensify during summer months, there is often little or no cloud cover during the summer. Due to its temperate climate and proximity to the Pacific Ocean, areas west of the Cascade Crest very rarely experience temperatures below 0 °F (−18 °C) or above 80 °F (27 °C).

== Geology ==
The North Cascades features some of the most rugged topography in the Cascade Range with craggy peaks, ridges, and deep glacial valleys. Geological events occurring many years ago created the diverse topography and drastic elevation changes over the Cascade Range leading to the various climate differences. These climate differences lead to vegetation variety defining the ecoregions in this area.

The history of the formation of the Cascade Mountains dates back millions of years ago to the late Eocene Epoch. With the North American Plate overriding the Pacific Plate, episodes of volcanic igneous activity persisted. In addition, small fragments of the oceanic and continental lithosphere called terranes created the North Cascades about 50 million years ago.

During the Pleistocene period dating back over two million years ago, glaciation advancing and retreating repeatedly scoured the landscape leaving deposits of rock debris. The U-shaped cross section of the river valleys is a result of recent glaciation. Uplift and faulting in combination with glaciation have been the dominant processes which have created the tall peaks and deep valleys of the North Cascades area.
