= Bacon Peak =

Mountain in Washington (state), United States

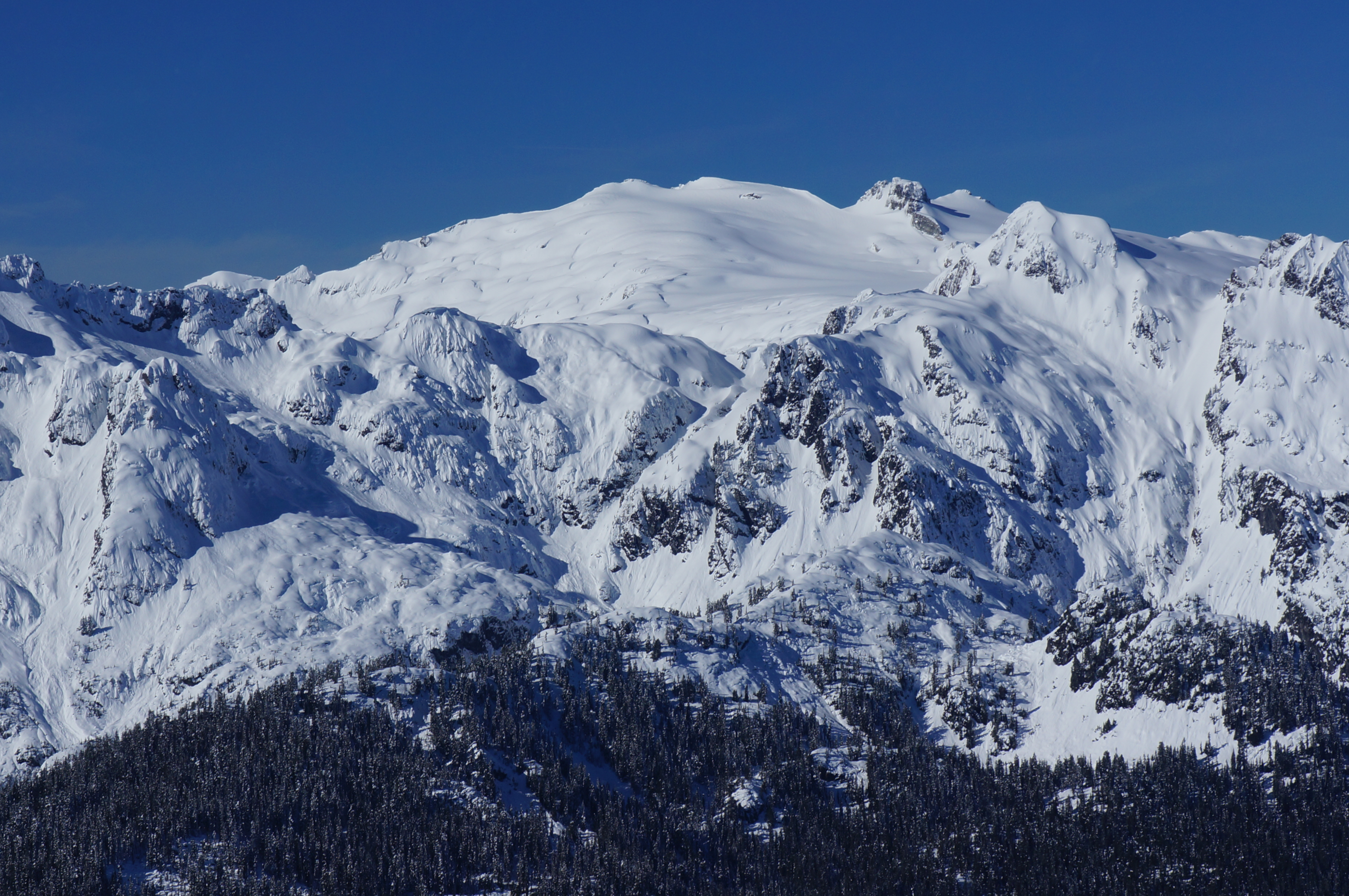
- Bacon Peak in winter seen from Oakes Peak

Highest point
- Elevation: 7,070 ft (2,155 m) NAVD 88
- Prominence: 2,505 ft (764 m)
- Coordinates: 48°39′46″N 121°31′14″W

Geography
- Location within Washington (state)
- Interactive map of Bacon Peak
- Location: North Cascades National Park; Whatcom County, Washington
- Parent range: North Cascades
- Topo map: USGS Bacon Peak

Climbing
- First ascent: R.B. Robertson, Eugene Logan (1905, possibly)

Bacon Peak is a mountain located in North Cascades National Park, in the Cascade Range in the U.S. state of Washington. Its glaciers cover 1.2 square miles (3.2 km^{2}); the three main glaciers are Diobsud Creek Glacier (southeast, 1.6 miles (2.5 km) wide), Green Lake Glacier (northeast, 1.3 miles (2.1 km) wide) and Noisy Creek Glacier (northwest, 0.9 miles (1.4 km) long).

== Climate ==
Bacon Peak is located in the marine west coast climate zone of western North America. Most weather fronts originate in the Pacific Ocean, and travel northeast toward the Cascade Mountains. As fronts approach the North Cascades, they are forced upward by the peaks of the Cascade Range, causing them to drop their moisture in the form of rain or snowfall onto the Cascades (Orographic lift). As a result, the west side of the North Cascades experiences high precipitation, especially during the winter months in the form of snowfall. During winter months, weather is usually cloudy, but, due to high pressure systems over the Pacific Ocean that intensify during summer months, there is often little or no cloud cover during the summer. Because of maritime influence, snow tends to be wet and heavy, resulting in high avalanche danger.

== Geology ==
The North Cascades features some of the most rugged topography in the Cascade Range with craggy peaks, spires, ridges, and deep glacial valleys. Geological events occurring many years ago created the diverse topography and drastic elevation changes over the Cascade Range leading to the various climate differences.

The history of the formation of the Cascade Mountains dates back millions of years ago to the late Eocene Epoch. With the North American Plate overriding the Pacific Plate, episodes of volcanic igneous activity persisted. In addition, small fragments of the oceanic and continental lithosphere called terranes created the North Cascades about 50 million years ago.

During the Pleistocene period dating back over two million years ago, glaciation advancing and retreating repeatedly scoured the landscape leaving deposits of rock debris. The U-shaped cross section of the river valleys is a result of recent glaciation. Uplift and faulting in combination with glaciation have been the dominant processes which have created the tall peaks and deep valleys of the North Cascades area.

== Nearby peaks ==
- Electric Butte
- Mount Watson
- Logger Butte
- Canadian Bacon
- Mount Despair

== Gallery ==
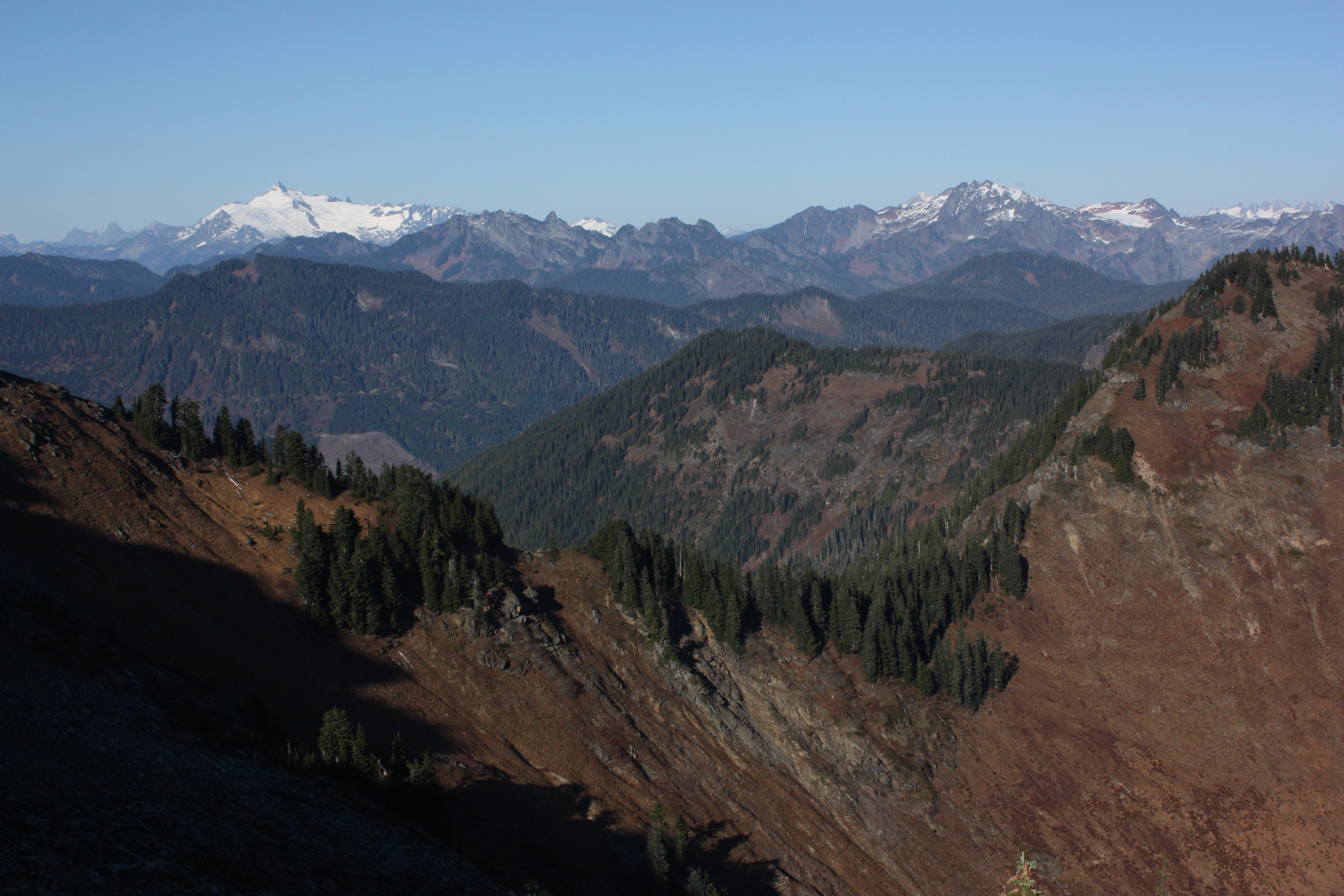
Bacon Peak (right skyline) and Mount Shuksan (left skyline)
