= Bacon Lake Falls =

Waterfall in Washington (state), United States

Coordinates: 48°41′04″N 121°30′25″W

Bacon Peak Falls is a 375-foot (114 m) unofficially-named waterfall on an unnamed stream that feeds remote Green Lake in North Cascades National Park, Whatcom County, in the U.S. state of Washington. It is fed by the largest meltwater stream from Green Lake Glacier. The meltwater from the glacier settles in a small tarn often known as "Bacon Lake" before dropping over the falls which flow almost directly into the far end of Green Lake.
