= Lookout Mountain (Washington) =

Mountain in Washington (state), United States

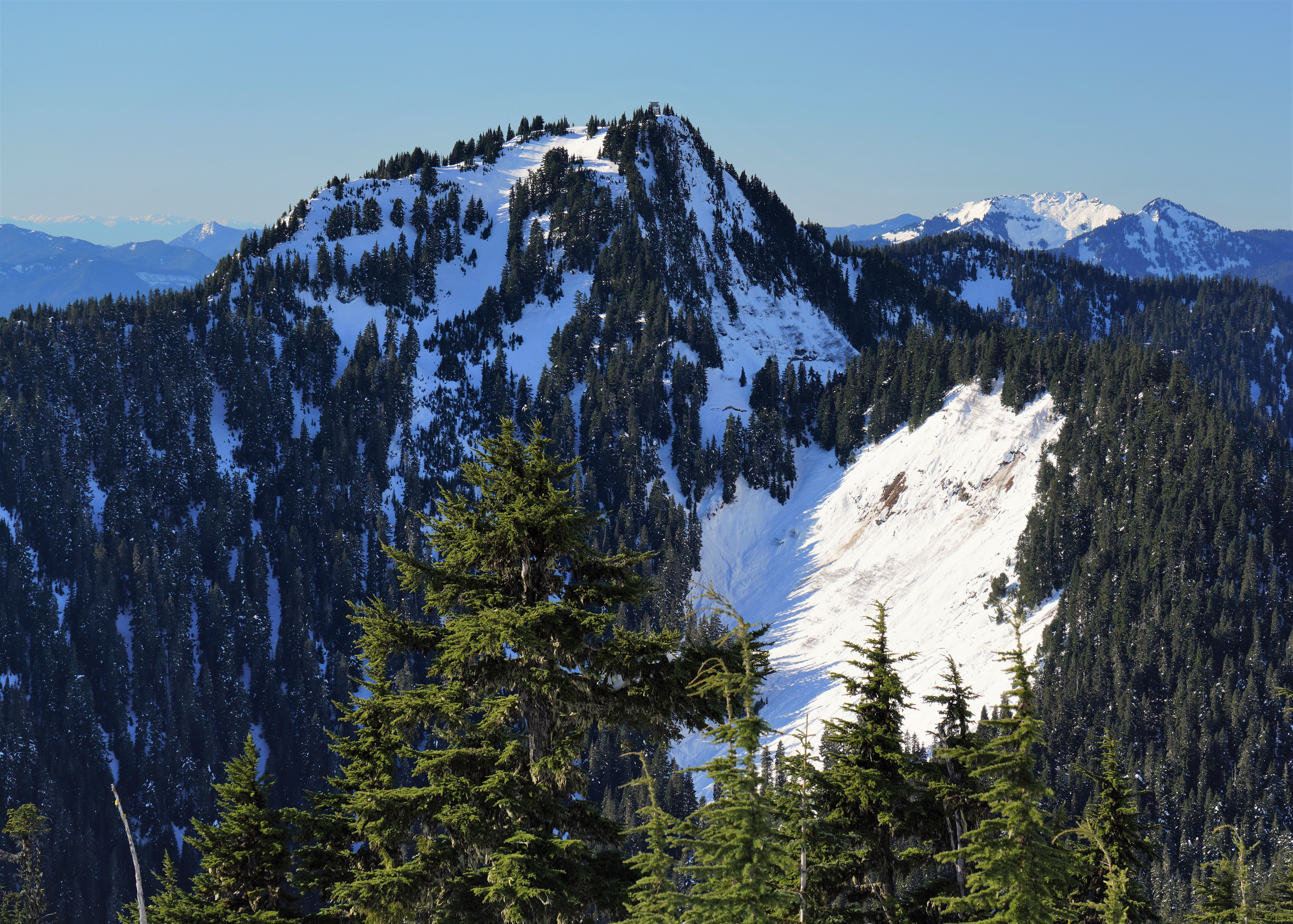
- Lookout Mountain, east aspect

Highest point
- Elevation: 5,699 ft (1,737 m)
- Prominence: 1,139 ft (347 m)
- Parent peak: Little Devil Peak (6,984 ft)
- Isolation: 3.17 mi (5.10 km)
- Coordinates: 48°33′07″N 121°19′46″W

Geography
- Location within Washington (state) Location within the United States
- Interactive map of Lookout Mountain
- Country: United States
- State: Washington
- County: Skagit
- Parent range: Cascade Range
- Topo map: USGS Big Devil Peak

Geology
- Rock type: meta-quartz diorite

Climbing
- Easiest route: Hiking trail

Lookout Mountain is a 5,699-foot (1,737 m) summit in the North Cascades, in Skagit County of Washington state. It is located five miles (8.0 km) east-northeast of the town of Marblemount, and set on land administered by the Mount Baker-Snoqualmie National Forest. The nearest higher neighbor is Teebone Ridge, two miles (3.2 km) to the east-northeast. At the top of Lookout Mountain is a historic US Forest Service lookout station that was built in 1962, which replaced a 1929 structure. Views from the top include Sauk Mountain to the west, with Eldorado Peak and the Picket Range in North Cascades National Park to the east and north respectively. The peak is just one mile outside the park boundary. Access is via a 4.7-mile (7.6 km) trail which gains over 4,400 feet (1,341 m) of elevation. Precipitation runoff from Lookout Mountain drains into tributaries of the Skagit River.

== Climate ==
Lookout Mountain is located in the marine west coast climate zone of western North America. Weather fronts originating in the Pacific Ocean move northeast toward the Cascade Mountains. As fronts approach the North Cascades, they are forced upward by the peaks of the Cascade Range (orographic lift), causing them to drop their moisture in the form of rain or snowfall onto the Cascades. As a result, the west side of the North Cascades experiences high precipitation, especially during the winter months in the form of snowfall. Because of maritime influence, snow tends to be wet and heavy, resulting in high avalanche danger. During winter months, weather is usually cloudy, but, due to high pressure systems over the Pacific Ocean that intensify during summer months, there is often little or no cloud cover during the summer. Due to its temperate climate and proximity to the Pacific Ocean, areas west of the Cascade Crest very rarely experience temperatures below 0 °F (−18 °C) or above 80 °F (27 °C).

== Geology ==
The North Cascades features some of the most rugged topography in the Cascade Range with craggy peaks, ridges, and deep glacial valleys. Geological events occurring many years ago created the diverse topography and drastic elevation changes over the Cascade Range leading to the various climate differences. These climate differences lead to vegetation variety defining the ecoregions in this area.

The history of the formation of the Cascade Mountains dates back millions of years ago to the late Eocene Epoch. With the North American Plate overriding the Pacific Plate, episodes of volcanic igneous activity persisted. In addition, small fragments of the oceanic and continental lithosphere called terranes created the North Cascades about 50 million years ago.

During the Pleistocene period dating back over two million years ago, glaciation advancing and retreating repeatedly scoured the landscape leaving deposits of rock debris. The U-shaped cross section of the river valleys is a result of recent glaciation. Uplift and faulting in combination with glaciation have been the dominant processes which have created the tall peaks and deep valleys of the North Cascades area.

== Gallery ==
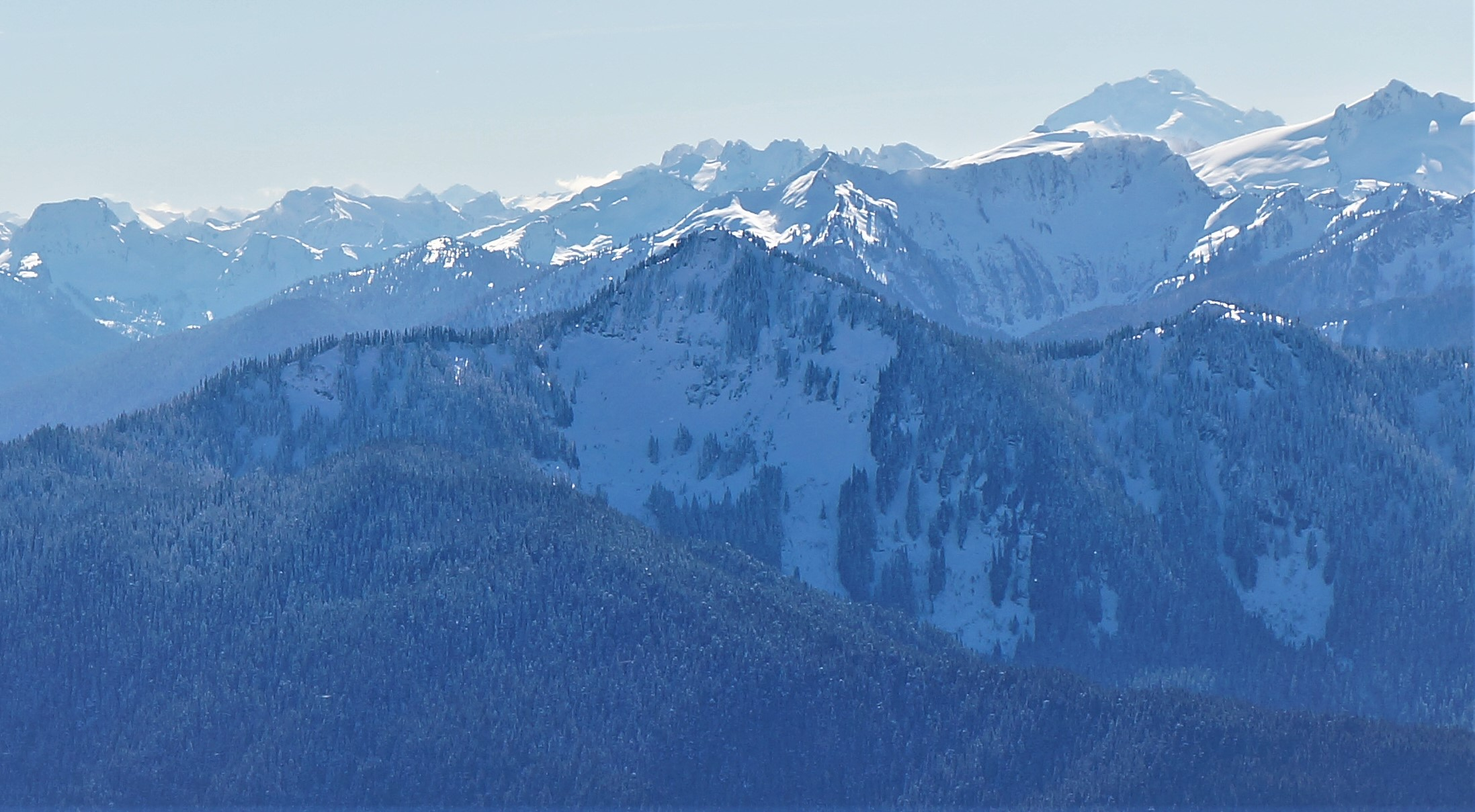
Lookout Mountain centered, north aspect

== See also ==
- Geography of the North Cascades
- Geology of the Pacific Northwest
