= Mount Despair (Washington) =

Mountain in Washington (state), United States

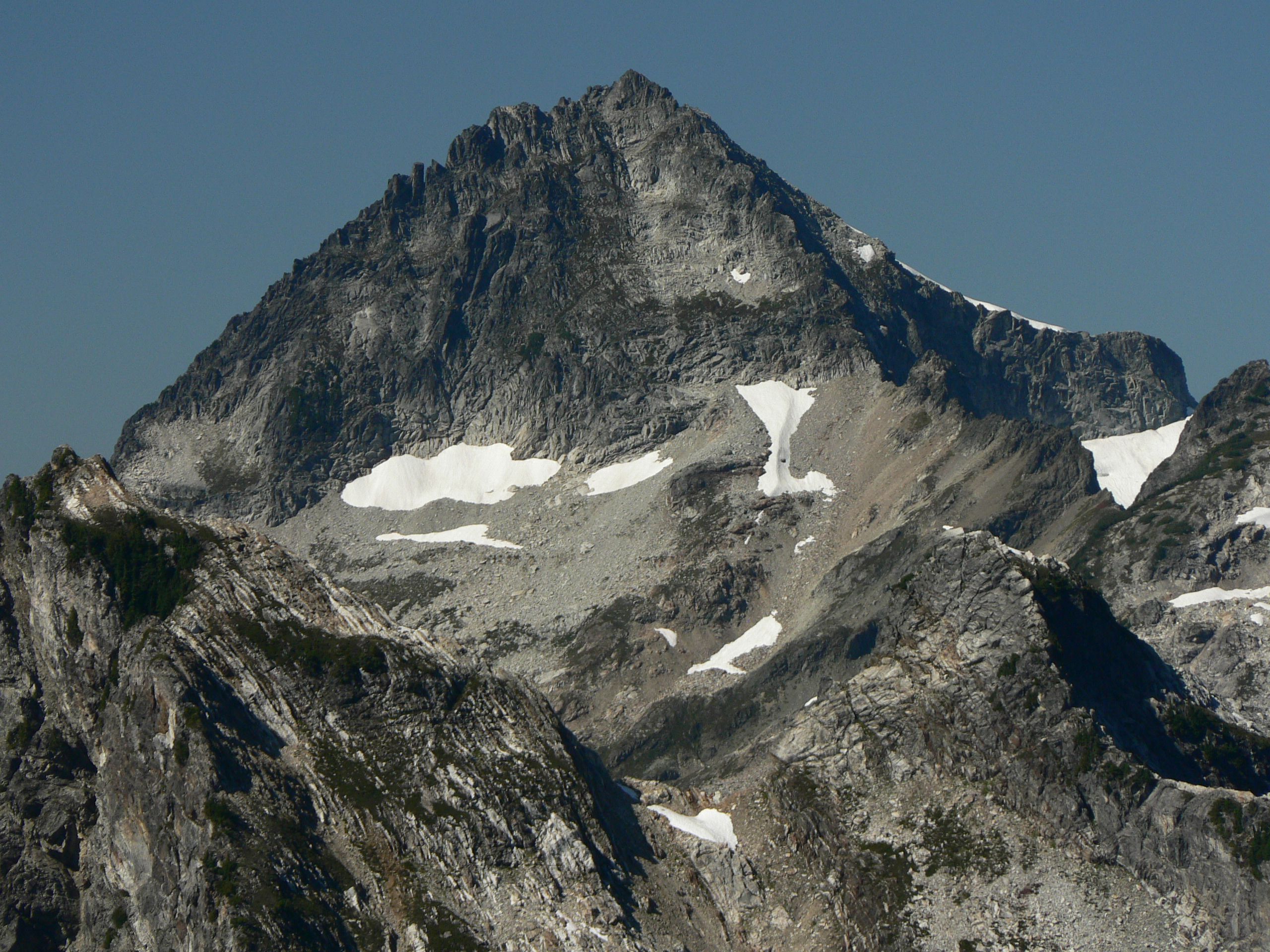

Highest point
- Elevation: 7,296 ft (2,224 m) NAVD 88
- Prominence: 1,852 ft (564 m)
- Coordinates: 48°44′14″N 121°22′36″W

Geography
- Location within Washington (state) Location within the United States
- Interactive map of Mount Despair
- Location: Whatcom County, Washington, U.S.
- Parent range: Cascade Range, North Cascades
- Topo map: USGS Damnation Peak

Climbing
- First ascent: Fred Beckey (1939)

Mount Despair is a rugged mountain in the North Unit of North Cascades National Park in Washington state. Northeast of Mount Despair lies the Picket Range.

The mountain's name was given by Lage Wernstedt of the U.S. Forest Service who mapped the region in the 1920s. The name Mount Despair first appeared on Forest Service maps in 1931.

== Climate ==
Mount Despair is located in the marine west coast climate zone of western North America. Most weather fronts originate in the Pacific Ocean, and travel northeast toward the Cascade Mountains.

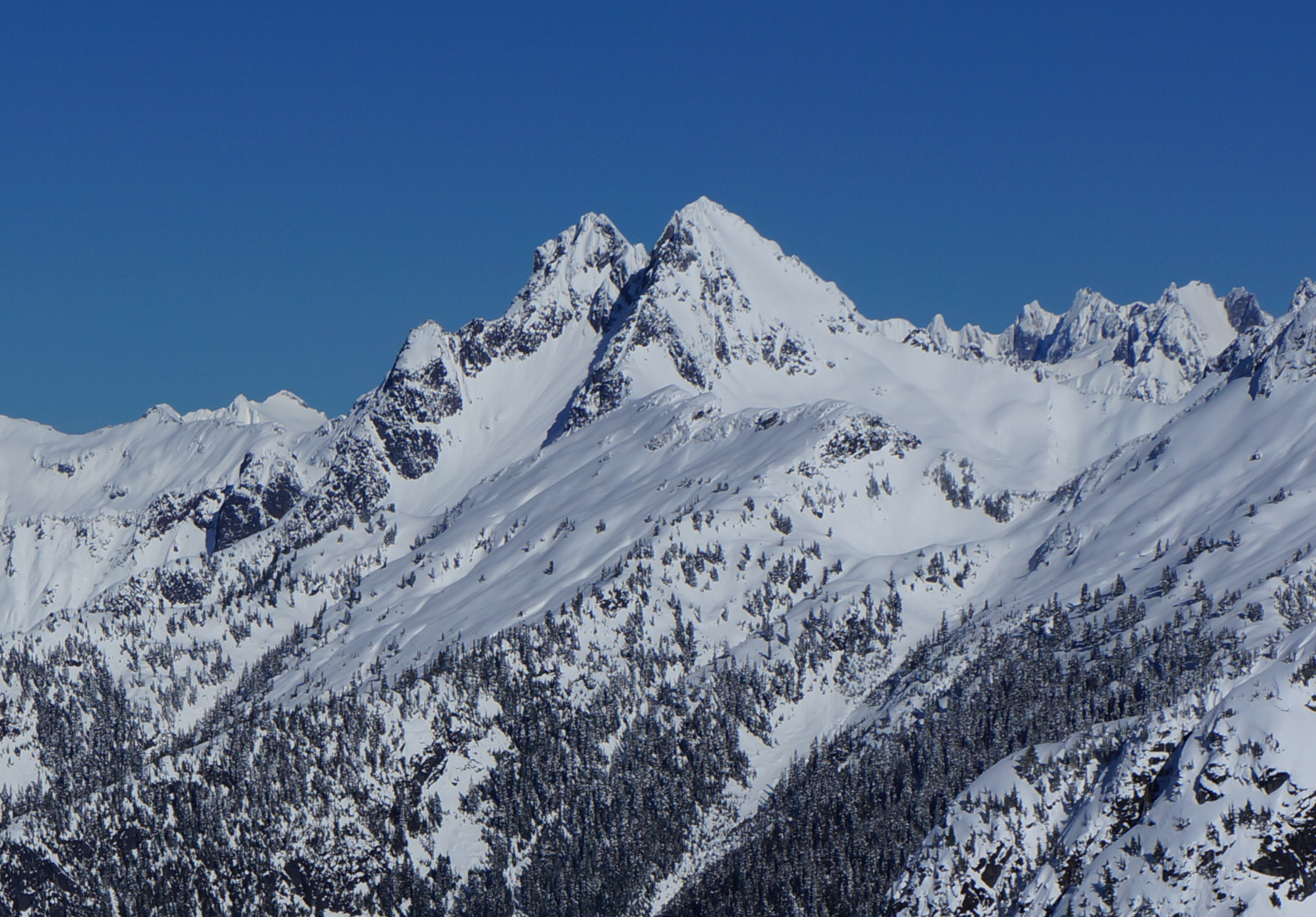
Mount Despair in winter

As fronts approach the North Cascades, they are forced upward by the peaks of the Cascade Range, causing them to drop their moisture in the form of rain or snowfall onto the Cascades (Orographic lift). As a result, the west side of the North Cascades experiences high precipitation, especially during the winter months in the form of snowfall. During winter months, weather is usually cloudy, but, due to high pressure systems over the Pacific Ocean that intensify during summer months, there is often little or no cloud cover during the summer. Because of maritime influence, snow tends to be wet and heavy, resulting in high avalanche danger.

== Geology ==
The North Cascades features some of the most rugged topography in the Cascade Range with craggy peaks, ridges, and deep glacial valleys. Geological events occurring many years ago created the diverse topography and drastic elevation changes over the Cascade Range leading to the various climate differences.

The history of the formation of the Cascade Mountains dates back millions of years ago to the late Eocene Epoch. With the North American Plate overriding the Pacific Plate, episodes of volcanic igneous activity persisted. In addition, small fragments of the oceanic and continental lithosphere called terranes created the North Cascades about 50 million years ago.

During the Pleistocene period dating back over two million years ago, glaciation advancing and retreating repeatedly scoured the landscape leaving deposits of rock debris. The U-shaped cross section of the river valleys is a result of recent glaciation. Uplift and faulting in combination with glaciation have been the dominant processes which have created the tall peaks and deep valleys of the North Cascades area.

== Nearby peaks ==
- Bacon Peak
- Mount Blum
- Mount Terror
- Mount Triumph

== Gallery ==
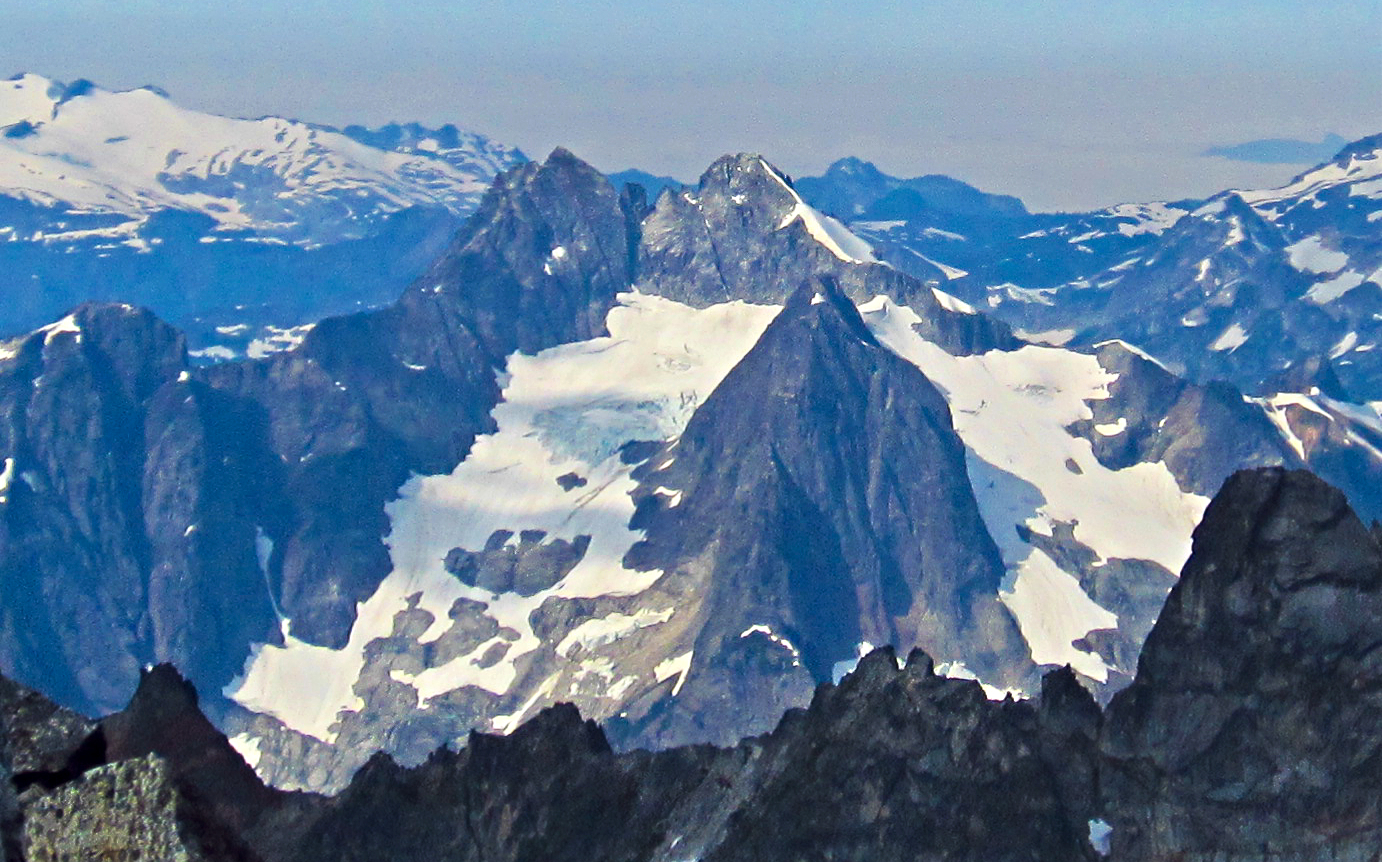
Mount Despair from the east featuring its glacier
