= Green Lake Glacier =

Glacier in the state of Washington

- Location within Washington (state)
- Type: Alpine glacier
- Location: Whatcom County, Washington, U.S.
- Coordinates: 48°39′49″N 121°31′13″W
- Length: .80 mi (1.29 km)
- Terminus: Barren rock/icefall
- Status: Retreating

Green Lake Glacier is in North Cascades National Park in the U.S. state of Washington and is immediately northeast of Bacon Peak. Green Lake Glacier descends from a ridge extending from the east of Bacon Peak. The glacier forms two tongues descending to the north of the ridge from 6,600 to 5,500 ft (2,000 to 1,700 m). The ridge is an arête which separates Green Lake Glacier from Diobsud Creek Glacier to the south. Meltwater from the glacier spills over Bacon Lake Falls en route to Green Lake.

== See also ==
- List of glaciers in the United States
