= Noisy-Diobsud Wilderness =

Wilderness area in Washington, United States

- IUCN category Ib (wilderness area)
- Location within the United States
- Location: Skagit / Whatcom counties, Washington, USA
- Nearest city: Concrete, WA
- Coordinates: 48°39′20″N 121°34′14″W
- Area: 14,100 acres (5,700 ha)
- Established: 1984
- Governing body: United States Forest Service

The Noisy-Diobsud Wilderness is a relatively small wilderness area in northwestern Washington state adjacent to North Cascades National Park. Created in 1984, the Noisy-Diobsud contains 14,100 acres (57 km^{2}) of steep valleys, subalpine lakes, and the summits of Anderson Butte and Mount Watson. It is part of Mount Baker National Forest.

The only maintained trail enters the west side of the wilderness from the Anderson Lakes road above Baker Lake.
