= Marblemount, Washington =

Place in Washington, United States

- CDP
- Location of Marblemount, Washington
- Coordinates: 48°32′30″N 121°26′23″W
- Country: United States
- State: Washington
- County: Skagit

Area
  - Total: 2.5 sq mi (6.4 km^{2})
  - Land: 2.4 sq mi (6.1 km^{2})
  - Water: 0.12 sq mi (0.3 km^{2})
- Elevation: 358 ft (109 m)

Population (2020)
  - Total: 286
  - Density: 120/sq mi (47/km^{2})
- Time zone: UTC-8 (Pacific (PST))
  - Summer (DST): UTC-7 (PDT)
- ZIP Code: 98267
- Area code: 360, 564
- FIPS code: 53-43325
- GNIS feature ID: 2408175

Marblemount is a census-designated place in Skagit County, Washington, United States. The population was 286 at the 2020 census. It is included in the Mount Vernon–Anacortes, Washington Metropolitan Statistical Area.

== History ==
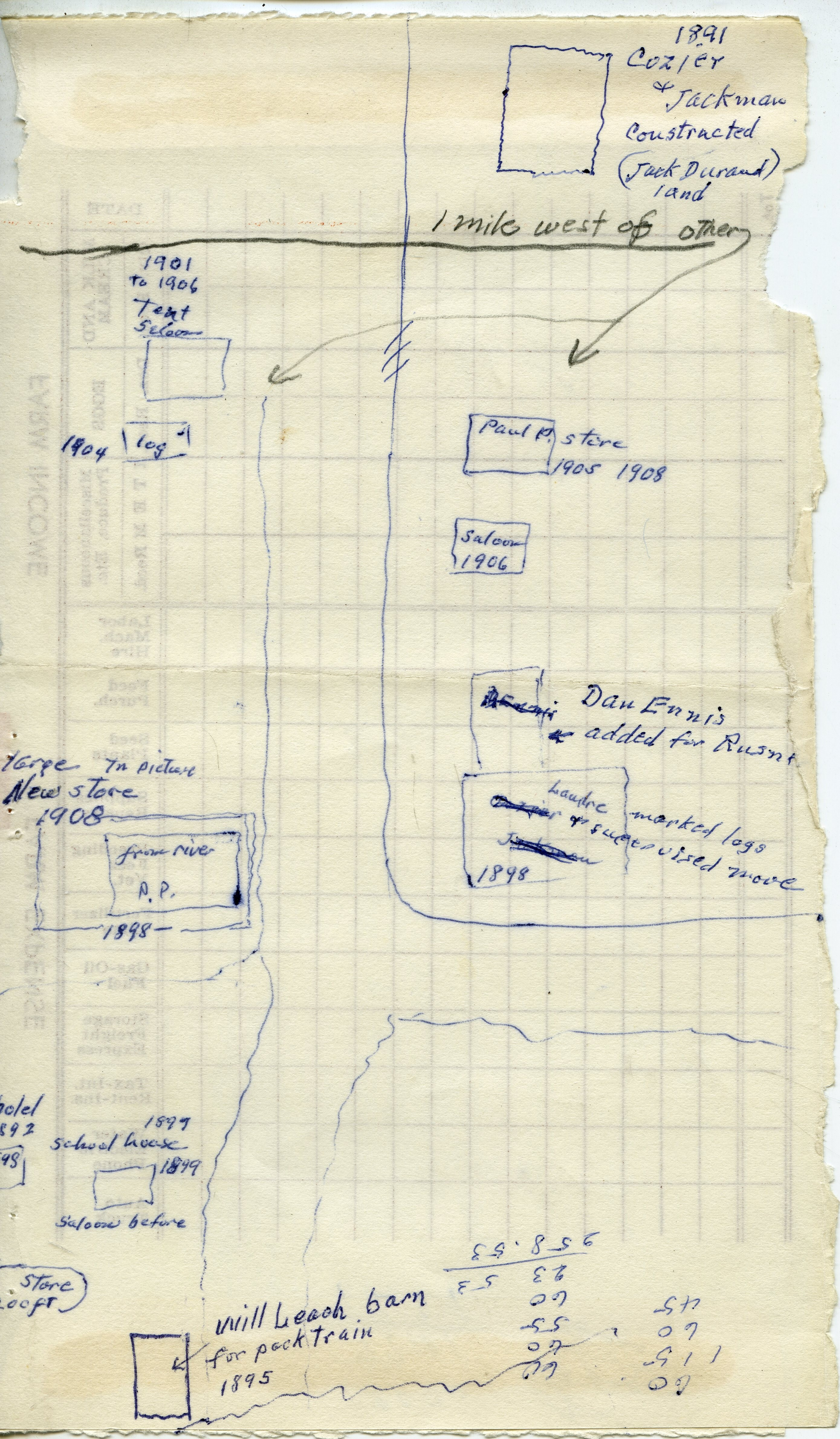
Historical hand-drawn map of Marblemount

Present-day Marblemount was the site of an indigenous village when naturalist George Gibbs explored the region in 1858. A community of Euro-Americans arose in the 1870s to supply goods for miners along the Skagit and Cascade River drainages. A wagon road was built between Marblemount and Sauk in 1892.

== Geography ==
Marblemount is situated at the confluence of the Cascade River and Skagit River. It is surrounded by Lookout Mountain to the east, and Helen Buttes to the northwest.

According to the United States Census Bureau, the CDP has a total area of 2.5 square miles (6.4 km^{2}), of which, 2.4 square miles (6.1 km^{2}) of it is land and 0.1 square miles (0.3 km^{2}) of it (4.44%) is water.

== Demographics ==
Historical population
Census	Pop.	Note	%±
2000	251		—
2010	203		−19.1%
2020	286		40.9%
U.S. Decennial Census; 1970 1980 1990; 2000 2010

Marblemount first appeared as a census designated place in the 2000 U.S. census.

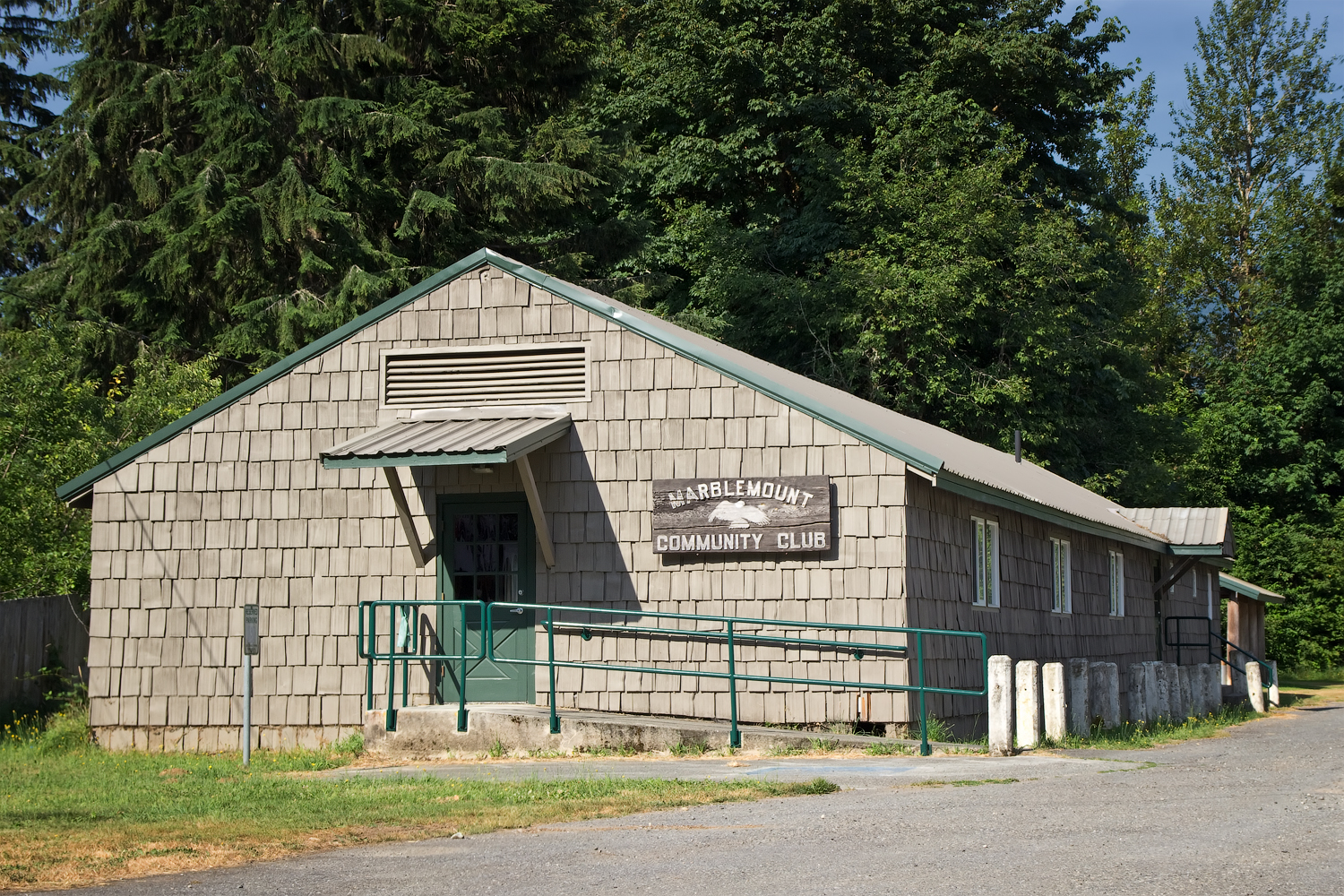
Marblemount Community Club

=== Racial and ethnic composition ===
Marblemount CDP, Washington – Racial and ethnic composition Note: the US Census treats Hispanic/Latino as an ethnic category. This table excludes Latinos from the racial categories and assigns them to a separate category. Hispanics/Latinos may be of any race.
Race / Ethnicity (NH = Non-Hispanic)	Pop 2000	Pop 2010	Pop 2020	% 2000	% 2010	% 2020
White alone (NH)	236	171	247	94.02%	84.24%	86.36%
Black or African American alone (NH)	1	1	3	0.40%	0.49%	1.05%
Native American or Alaska Native alone (NH)	5	11	6	1.99%	5.42%	2.10%
Asian alone (NH)	0	2	1	0.00%	0.99%	0.35%
Native Hawaiian or Pacific Islander alone (NH)	0	1	0	0.00%	0.49%	0.00%
Other race alone (NH)	0	2	1	0.00%	0.99%	0.35%
Mixed race or Multiracial (NH)	7	8	17	2.79%	3.94%	5.94%
Hispanic or Latino (any race)	2	7	11	0.80%	3.45%	3.85%
Total	251	203	286	100.00%	100.00%	100.00%

=== 2000 census ===
As of the census of 2000, there were 251 people, 93 households, and 59 families residing in the CDP. The population density was 106.1 people per square mile (40.9/km^{2}). There were 124 housing units at an average density of 52.4/sq mi (20.2/km^{2}). The racial makeup of the CDP was 94.02% White, 0.40% African American, 1.99% Native American, 0.80% from other races, and 2.79% from two or more races. Hispanic or Latino of any race were 0.80% of the population.

There were 93 households, out of which 32.3% had children under the age of 18 living with them, 46.2% were married couples living together, 11.8% had a female householder with no husband present, and 35.5% were non-families. 31.2% of all households were made up of individuals, and 7.5% had someone living alone who was 65 years of age or older. The average household size was 2.70 and the average family size was 3.28.

In the CDP the age distribution of the population shows 31.1% under the age of 18, 5.6% from 18 to 24, 25.5% from 25 to 44, 27.9% from 45 to 64, and 10.0% who were 65 years of age or older. The median age was 37 years. For every 100 females, there were 116.4 males. For every 100 females age 18 and over, there were 124.7 males.

The median income for a household in the CDP was $25,156, and the median income for a family was $26,250. Males had a median income of $37,232 versus $15,278 for females. The per capita income for the CDP was $15,353. About 14.3% of families and 16.5% of the population were below the poverty line, including 10.8% of those under the age of eighteen and 26.7% of those 65 or over.

== Education ==
The community is served by the Concrete School District.

== Motorcycle touring ==
Marblemount is on Washington State Route 20, the North Cascades Highway, often rated as the top motorcycling road in Washington State for scenery, remoteness, road quality, and other features. It is the last place for road services on the west side of North Cascades National Park for eastbound travelers, the next being Winthrop, 70 miles (110 km) away.
