= Swamp–Meadow Cabin (east) =

Historic house in Washington, United States

- U.S. National Register of Historic Places
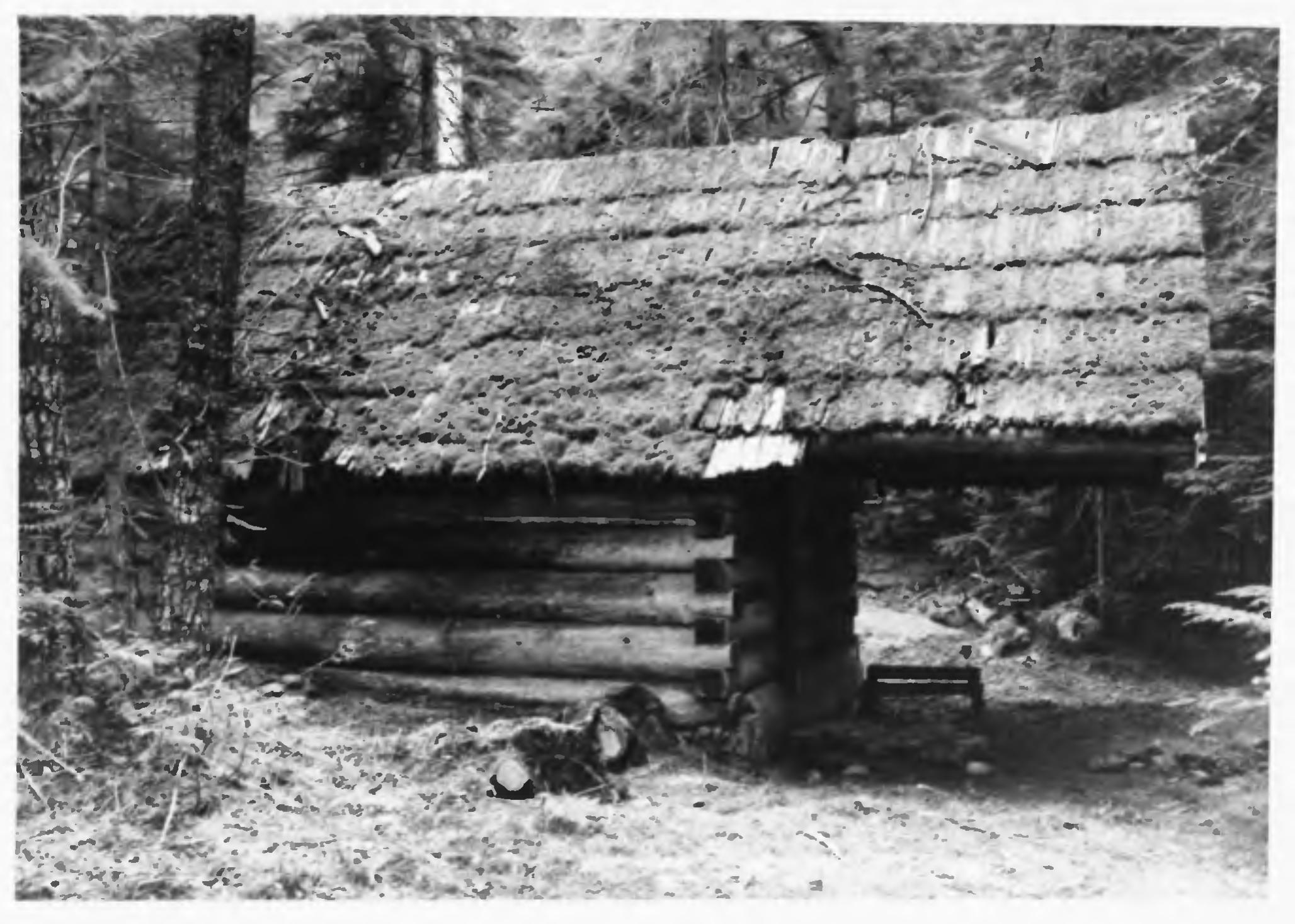
- Swamp Meadow Cabin east

- Location within Washington (state)
- Nearest city: Diablo, Washington
- Coordinates: 48°34′44″N 121°01′05″W
- Area: less than one acre
- Built: 1912
- MPS: North Cascades National Park Service Complex MRA
- NRHP reference No.: 88003456
- Added to NRHP: February 10, 1989

The Swamp–Meadow Cabin (east) is in North Cascades National Park, in the U.S. state of Washington. Constructed sometime in the early 1910s by the North Coast Mining and Milling Company, the cabin was a warm season residence used by company employees for storage and residence while working their mining claims on Thunder Creek. The cabin was constructed plainly of rounded hewn logs, square notched at the corners. The cabin is 15 by 18 ft (4.6 by 5.5 m) with an offset door at the south end, above which it is sheltered by the large overhanging extension of a gable roof which is wood shingled. Swamp–Meadow Cabin (east) is near Swamp–Meadow Cabin (west), and both were placed on the National Register of Historic Places in 1989.
