= Stout Lake =

Lake in Skagit County, Washington, United States

- Location within Washington (state) Location within the United States
- Location: North Cascades National Park, Skagit County, Washington, United States
- Coordinates: 48°35′28″N 121°11′47″W
- Type: Tarn
- Basin countries: United States
- Max. length: .25 mi (0.40 km)
- Max. width: .20 mi (0.32 km)
- Surface elevation: 5,223 ft (1,592 m)

Stout Lake is located in North Cascades National Park, in the U. S. state of Washington. Stout Lake is 1.25 mi (2.01 km) southwest of Wilcox Lakes.
