= Wilcox Lakes =

Lakes in Skagit County, Washington, US

- Location within Washington (state) Location within the United States
- Location: North Cascades National Park, Skagit County, Washington, United States
- Coordinates: 48°36′04″N 121°10′26″W
- Type: Tarns
- Basin countries: United States
- Max. length: 300 yd (270 m)
- Max. width: 200 yd (180 m)
- Surface elevation: 5,121 ft (1,561 m)

Wlicox Lakes are located in North Cascades National Park, in the U. S. state of Washington. The Wilcox Lakes consists of two small lakes and several more tarns and are 1.1 mi (1.8 km) northeast of Stout Lake. The Wilcox Lakes are the origination point for the East Fork Nehalem Creek and the lakes were named for Paul B. Wilcox who was the first to discover them.
