= The Chopping Block (Washington) =

Mountain in Washington (state), United States

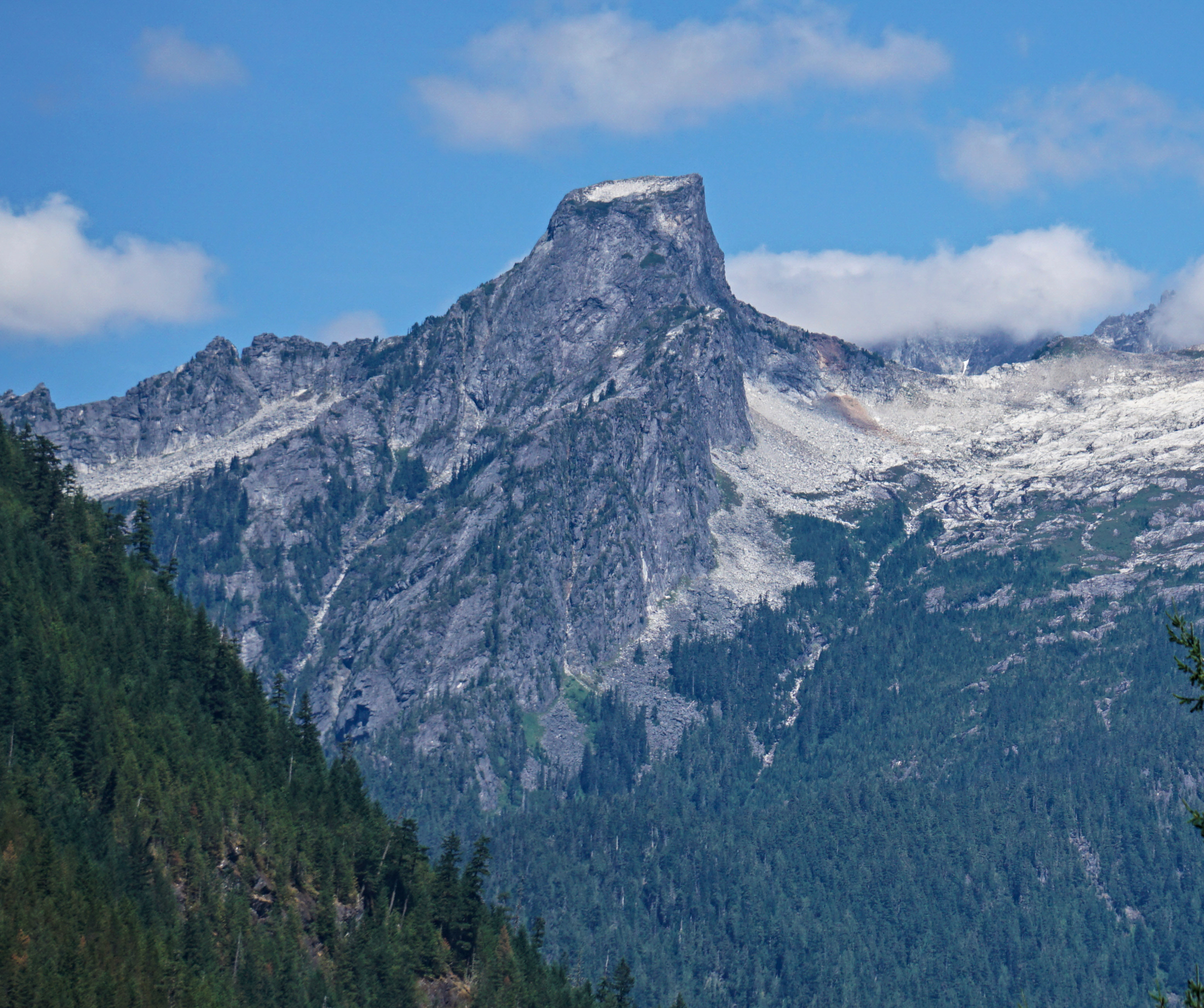
- The Chopping Block, south aspect

Highest point
- Elevation: 6,819 ft (2,078 m)
- Prominence: 579 ft (176 m)
- Coordinates: 48°45′18″N 121°18′29″W

Geography
- Location within Washington (state) Location within the United States
- Interactive map of The Chopping Block
- Location: North Cascades National Park; Whatcom County, Washington
- Parent range: Picket Range; Cascade Range
- Topo map: USGS Mount Challenger

Geology
- Rock type: Skagit Gneiss

Climbing
- Easiest route: Climbing YDS 5

The Chopping Block is a 6,819-foot (2,078-metre) mountain summit located in the Picket Range within North Cascades National Park in the state of Washington. The mountain is officially named Pinnacle Peak on maps, but hardly anyone calls it by that name. The nearest higher peak is Mount Degenhardt, 0.6 mi (0.97 km) to the northeast. The Chopping Block can be seen from the North Cascades National Park Newhalem visitor center, weather permitting. Precipitation runoff from the peak drains into Goodell Creek, a tributary of the Skagit River.

== Climate ==
The Chopping Block is located in the marine west coast climate zone of western North America. Most weather fronts originate in the Pacific Ocean, and travel northeast toward the Cascade Mountains. As fronts approach the North Cascades, they are forced upward by the peaks of the Cascade Range, causing them to drop their moisture in the form of rain or snowfall onto the Cascades (Orographic lift). As a result, the west side of the North Cascades experiences high precipitation, especially during the winter months in the form of snowfall. During winter months, weather is usually cloudy, but, due to high pressure systems over the Pacific Ocean that intensify during summer months, there is often little or no cloud cover during the summer. Because of maritime influence, snow tends to be wet and heavy, resulting in high avalanche danger.

== Geology ==
The North Cascades features some of the most rugged topography in the Cascade Range with craggy peaks, spires, ridges, and deep glacial valleys. Geological events occurring many years ago created the diverse topography and drastic elevation changes over the Cascade Range leading to the various climate differences.

The history of the formation of the Cascade Mountains dates back millions of years ago to the late Eocene Epoch. With the North American Plate overriding the Pacific Plate, episodes of volcanic igneous activity persisted. In addition, small fragments of the oceanic and continental lithosphere called terranes created the North Cascades about 50 million years ago.

During the Pleistocene period dating back over two million years ago, glaciation advancing and retreating repeatedly scoured the landscape leaving deposits of rock debris. The U-shaped cross section of the river valleys is a result of recent glaciation. Uplift and faulting in combination with glaciation have been the dominant processes which have created the tall peaks and deep valleys of the North Cascades area.

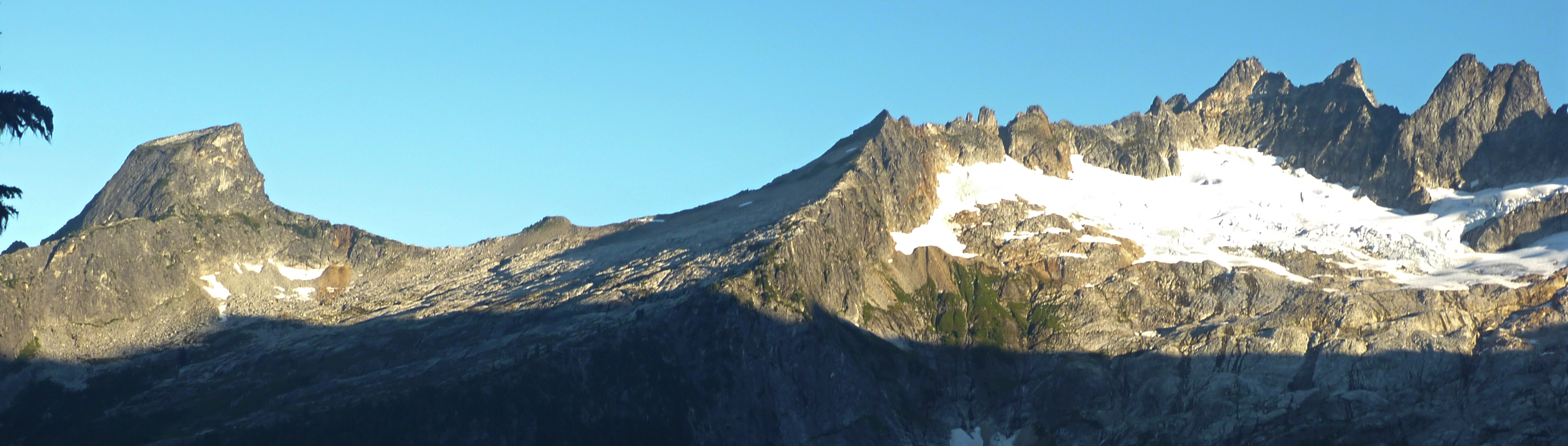
Left to right: The Chopping Block, The Barrier, Terror Glacier, Mount Degenhardt, Inspiration Peak
