= Rhino Butte =

Mountain in Washington (state), United States

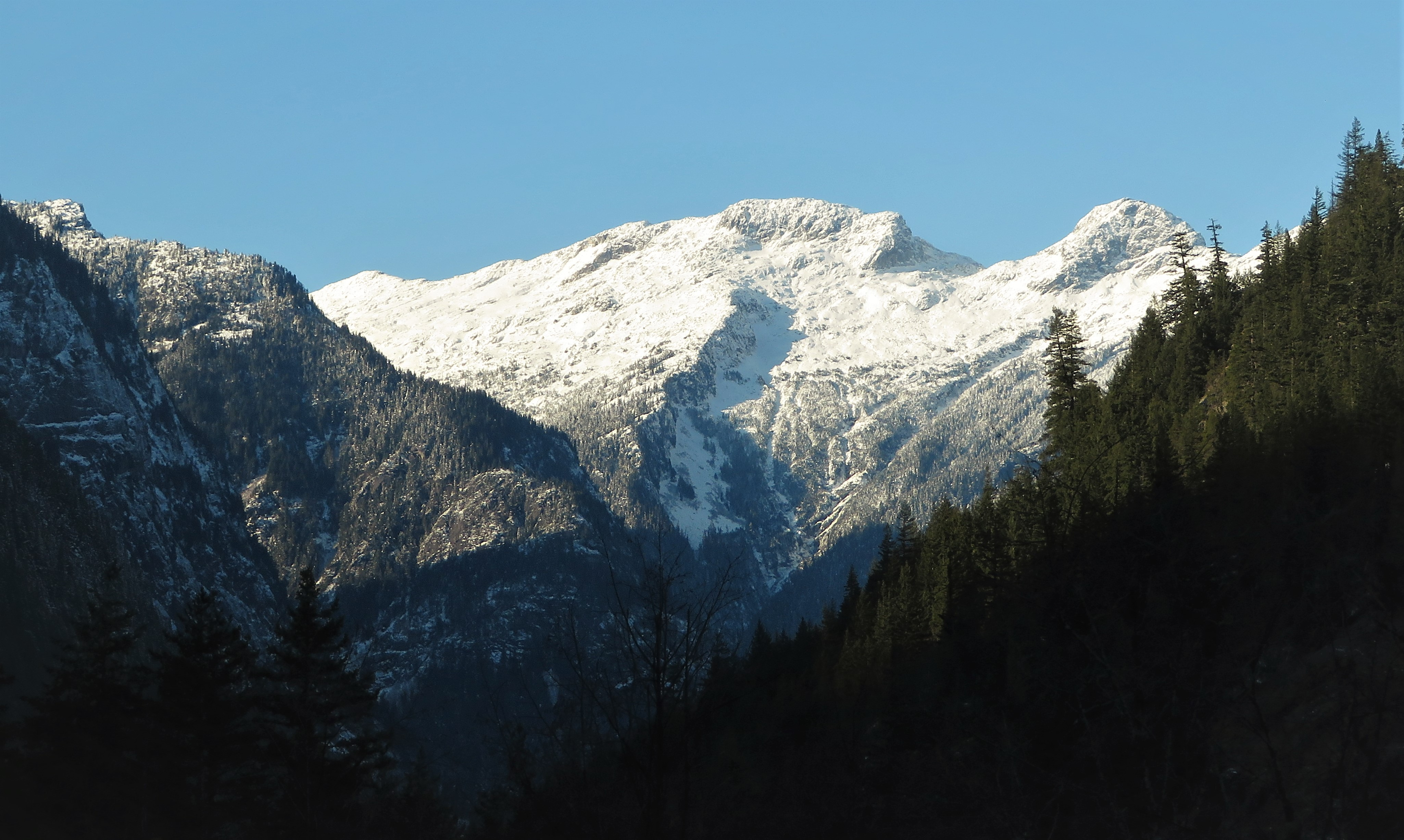
- Rhino Butte from the southeast

Highest point
- Elevation: 6,914 ft (2,107 m)
- Prominence: 554 ft (169 m)
- Parent peak: Elephant Butte (7,380 ft)
- Isolation: 1.29 mi (2.08 km)
- Coordinates: 48°47′05″N 121°14′38″W

Geography
- Location within Washington (state) Location within the United States
- Interactive map of Rhino Butte
- Location: North Cascades National Park; Whatcom County, Washington, U.S.
- Parent range: Cascades Range; North Cascades; Picket Range
- Topo map: USGS Mount Prophet

Geology
- Rock type: Orthogneiss

Climbing
- First ascent: 1978, John Roper (solo)

Rhino Butte is a remote 6,914-foot-elevation summit located in Whatcom County of Washington, United States. It is situated within North Cascades National Park and Stephen Mather Wilderness, and is part of the Picket Range, a subset of the North Cascades. Like many North Cascades peaks, Rhino Butte is more notable for its large, steep rise above local terrain than for its absolute elevation. Topographic relief is significant as the north aspect rises 4,350 feet (1,330 meters) above McMillan Creek in one mile, and the south aspect rises 4,700 feet (1,400 meters) above Stetattle Creek in two miles. Precipitation runoff from the mountain drains to the Skagit River via these two creeks. The nearest higher neighbor is Elephant Butte, 1.27 mile to the east-northeast, with Hippo Butte (6,889 ft) between the two. A high alpine ridge connects Rhino to McMillan Spire, 1.7 mile to the west-southwest, and Azure Lake lies below this ridge. The first ascent of the summit was made October 15, 1978, by John Roper. This geographical feature's name has not yet been officially adopted by the United States Board on Geographic Names.

== Climate ==
Rhino Butte is located in the marine west coast climate zone of western North America. Most weather fronts originate in the Pacific Ocean, and travel northeast toward the Cascade Mountains. As fronts approach the North Cascades, they are forced upward by the peaks of the Cascade Range, causing them to drop their moisture in the form of rain or snowfall onto the Cascades (Orographic lift). As a result, the west side of the North Cascades experiences high precipitation, especially during the winter months in the form of snowfall. During winter months, weather is usually cloudy, but, due to high pressure systems over the Pacific Ocean that intensify during summer months, there is often little or no cloud cover during the summer. Because of maritime influence, snow tends to be wet and heavy, resulting in avalanche danger.

== Geology ==
The North Cascades features some of the most rugged topography in the Cascade Range with craggy peaks, ridges, and deep glacial valleys. Geological events occurring many years ago created the diverse topography and drastic elevation changes over the Cascade Range leading to the various climate differences. These climate differences lead to vegetation variety defining the ecoregions in this area.

The history of the formation of the Cascade Mountains dates back millions of years ago to the late Eocene Epoch. With the North American Plate overriding the Pacific Plate, episodes of volcanic igneous activity persisted. In addition, small fragments of the oceanic and continental lithosphere called terranes created the North Cascades about 50 million years ago.

During the Pleistocene period dating back over two million years ago, glaciation advancing and retreating repeatedly scoured the landscape leaving deposits of rock debris. The U-shaped cross section of the river valleys is a result of recent glaciation. Uplift and faulting in combination with glaciation have been the dominant processes which have created the tall peaks and deep valleys of the North Cascades area.

== Gallery ==
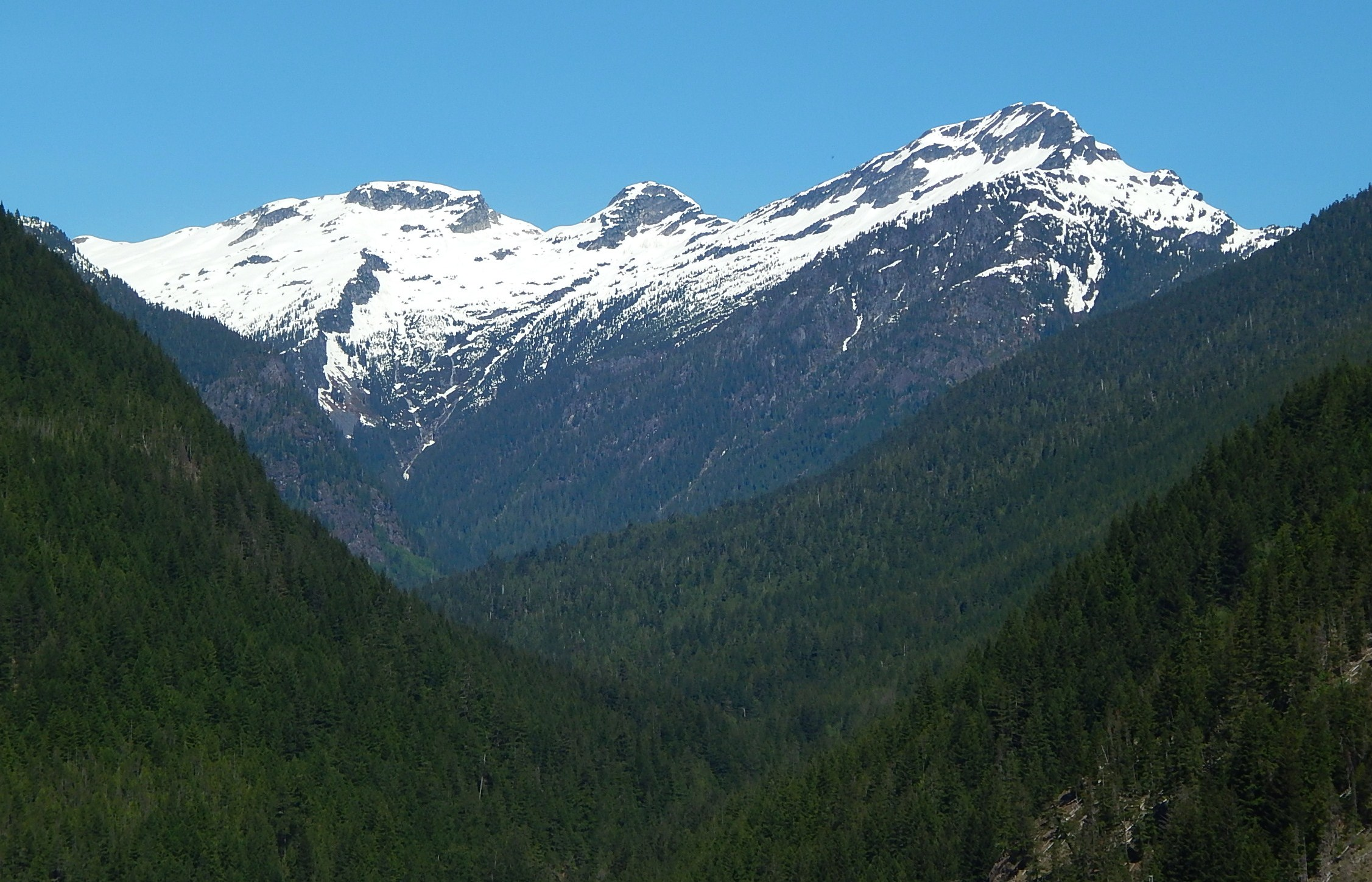
Rhino, Hippo, and Elephant Buttes
