= Terror Glacier =

Terror Glacier may refer to:

- Terror Glacier (Antarctica)
- Terror Glacier (Washington), in the North Cascades National Park, Washington, USA
