= Glee Peak =

Mountain in Washington (state), United States

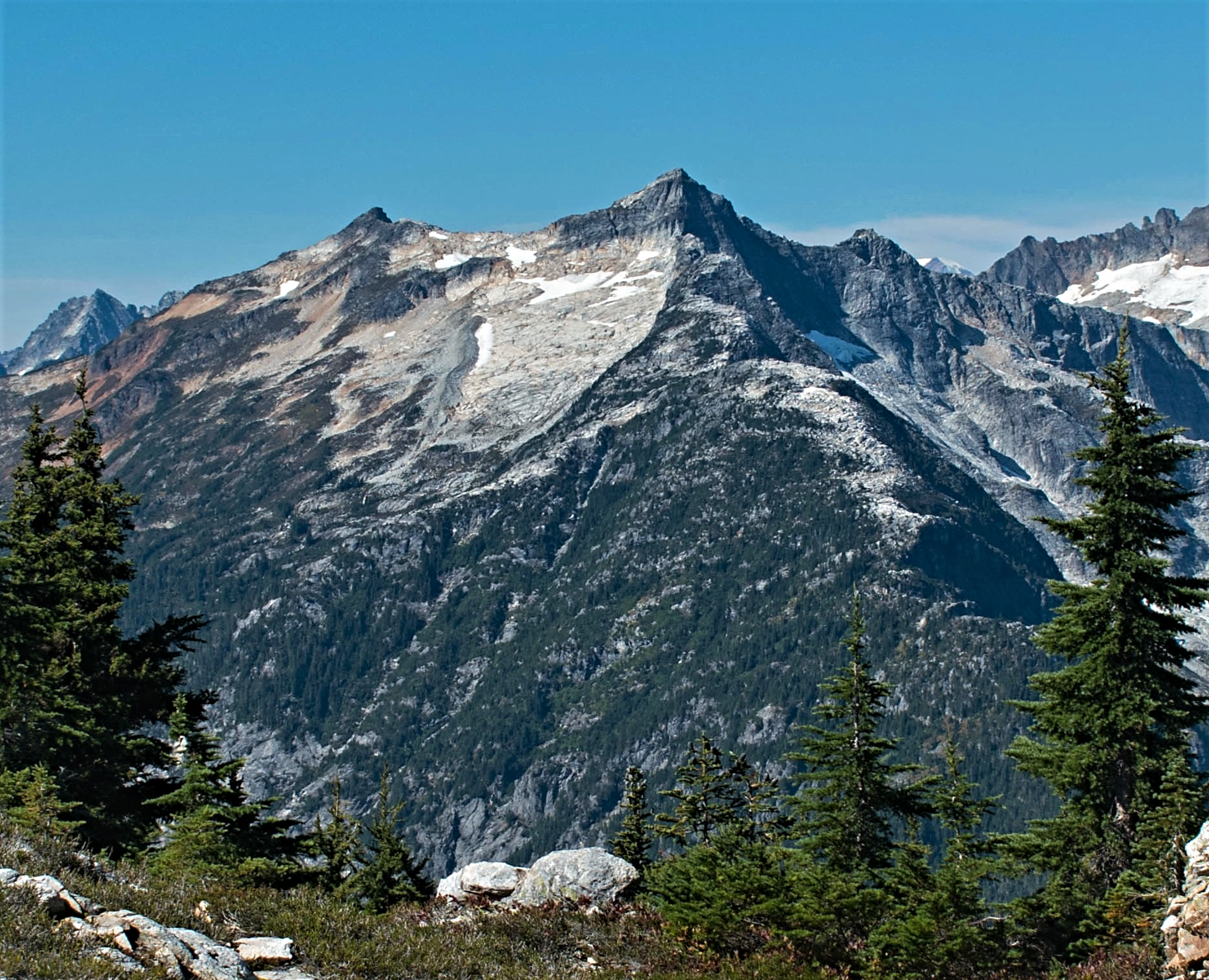
- East aspect

Highest point
- Elevation: 7,180 ft (2,188 m)
- Prominence: 920 ft (280 m)
- Parent peak: McMillan Spire (8,004 ft)
- Isolation: 1.66 mi (2.67 km)
- Coordinates: 48°45′15″N 121°15′22″W

Naming
- Etymology: Glee Glenmore Davis

Geography
- Location within Washington (state) Location within the United States
- Interactive map of Glee Peak
- Country: United States
- State: Washington
- County: Whatcom
- Protected area: North Cascades National Park
- Parent range: Cascade Range; North Cascades; Picket Range
- Topo map: USGS Mount Challenger

Geology
- Rock type: Granodiorite

Climbing
- Easiest route: scrambling

Glee Peak is a 7,180-foot-elevation (2,190-meter) mountain summit located in Whatcom County of Washington state, United States. It is set within North Cascades National Park and Stephen Mather Wilderness, where it is situated 1.7 mile north of The Roost and one mile south of Azure Lake. The nearest higher neighbor is McMillan Spire, 1.7 miles (2.7 km) to the north-northwest. Glee Peak is part of the Picket Range which is a sub-range of the North Cascades, and like many North Cascades peaks, it is more notable for its large, steep rise above local terrain than for its absolute elevation. Topographic relief is significant as the northeast aspect rises 4,000 feet (1,200 meters) above Stetattle Creek in approximately one mile, and the southwest aspect rises 6,000 feet (1,800 meters) above Goodell Creek in three miles. Precipitation runoff from the mountain drains into these two creeks which are both tributaries of the Skagit River. Who made the first ascent of the summit is unknown, but Glee Davis and Burton Babcock were climbing in the immediate area as early as 1905.

== Etymology ==
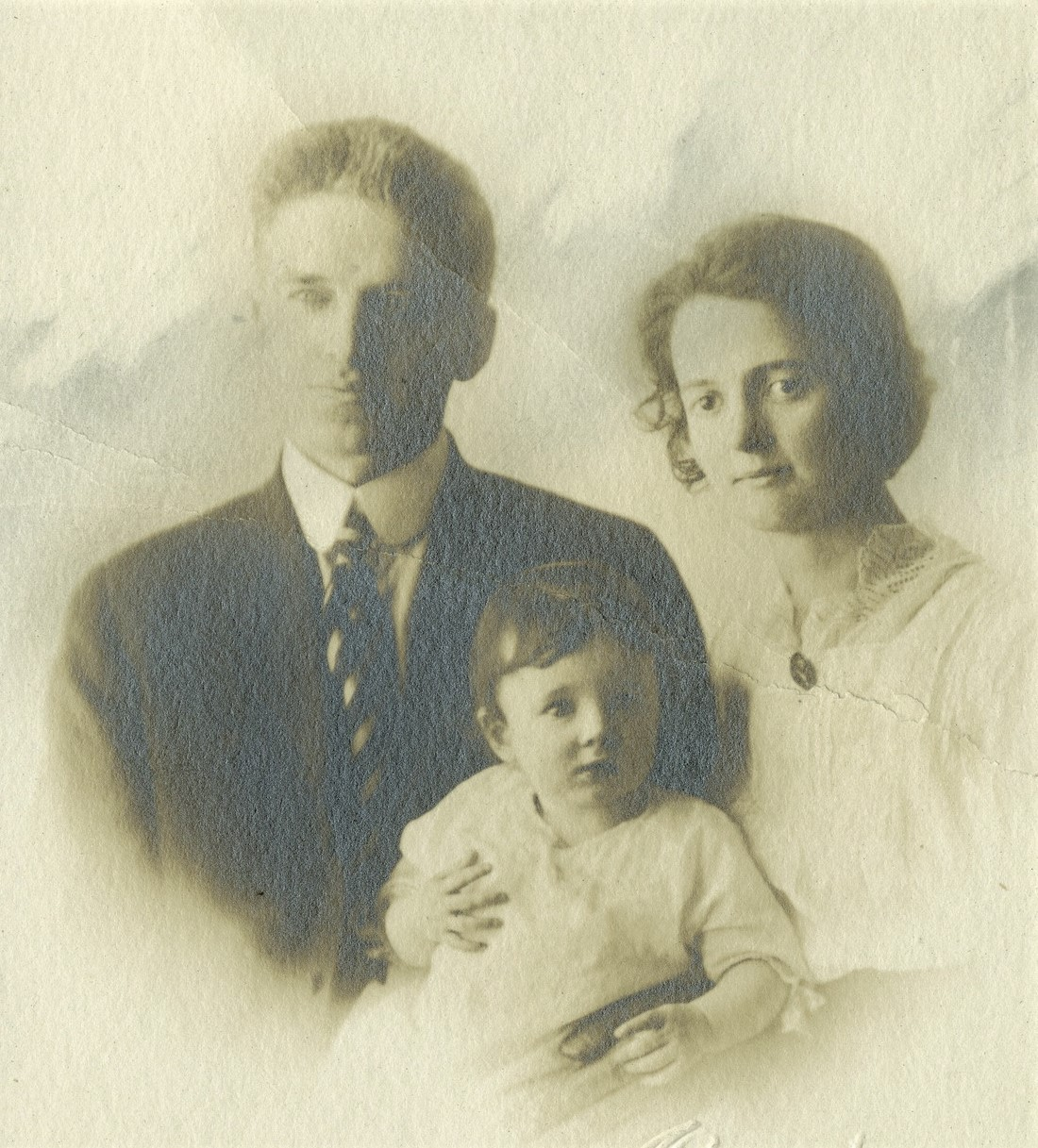
Glee Davis, wife Hazel, and baby in 1918

Davis Peak, located three miles southeast of Glee Peak, is officially named for the pioneering Davis family, who settled in the Skagit Valley near the base of the mountain. The family was led by Lucinda Davis, the mother of three children, who named her youngest son, Glee Davis (1885–1982). In his later years, Glee would have a homestead here and construct an electric generator on Stetattle Creek. The homestead was lost when Seattle City Light had the land condemned for the purpose of building hydroelectric dams on the Skagit. He also worked for the Forest Service, and in 1917 he built one of the country's first fire lookout towers on nearby Sourdough Mountain after he built the Sourdough Mountain trail in 1916. Glee Peak is the unofficial name of this landform, and will remain unofficial as long as the USGS policy of not adopting new toponyms in designated wilderness areas stays in effect.

== Geology ==
The North Cascades features some of the most rugged topography in the Cascade Range with craggy peaks, ridges, and deep glacial valleys. Geological events occurring many years ago created the diverse topography and drastic elevation changes over the Cascade Range leading to the various climate differences. These climate differences lead to vegetation variety defining the ecoregions in this area.

The history of the formation of the Cascade Mountains dates back millions of years ago to the late Eocene Epoch. With the North American Plate overriding the Pacific Plate, episodes of volcanic igneous activity persisted. In addition, small fragments of the oceanic and continental lithosphere called terranes created the North Cascades about 50 million years ago.

During the Pleistocene period, glaciation advancing and retreating repeatedly scoured the landscape leaving deposits of rock debris. The U-shaped cross section of the river valleys is a result of recent glaciation. Uplift and faulting in combination with glaciation have been the dominant processes which have created the tall peaks and deep valleys of the North Cascades area.

== Climate ==
Glee Peak is located in the marine west coast climate zone of western North America. Weather fronts originating in the Pacific Ocean travel east toward the Cascade Mountains. As fronts approach the North Cascades, they are forced upward by the peaks of the Cascade Range (orographic lift), causing them to drop their moisture in the form of rain or snowfall onto the Cascades. As a result, the west side of the North Cascades experiences high precipitation, especially during the winter months in the form of snowfall. Because of maritime influence, snow tends to be wet and heavy, resulting in high avalanche danger. During winter months, weather is usually cloudy, but due to high pressure systems over the Pacific Ocean that intensify during summer months, there is often little or no cloud cover during the summer.

== Gallery ==
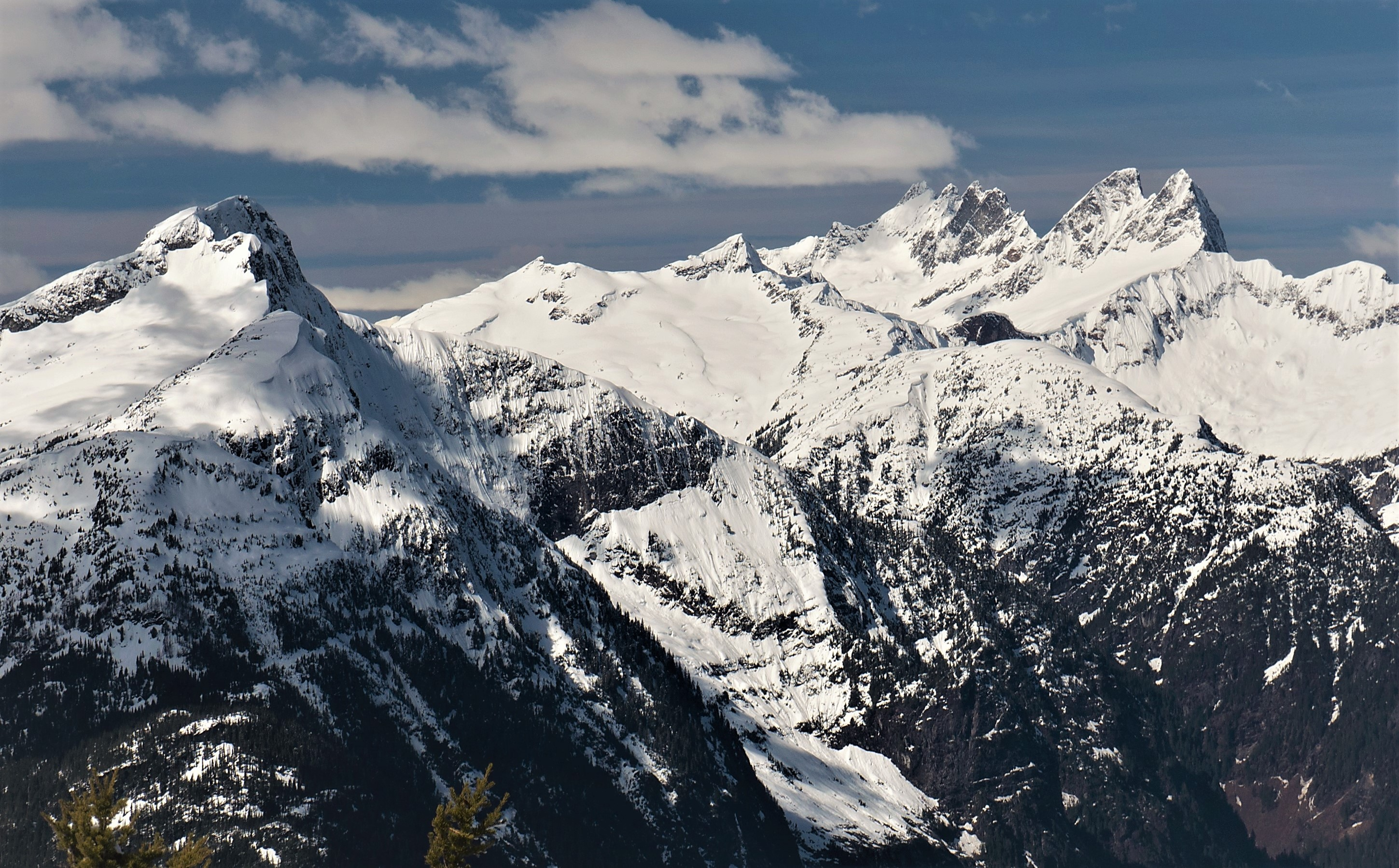
View from Ruby Mountain, featuring Davis Peak (left), Glee Peak (centered), Mt. Degenhardt/Inspiration Peak (right of center), and the McMillan Spires to the right.

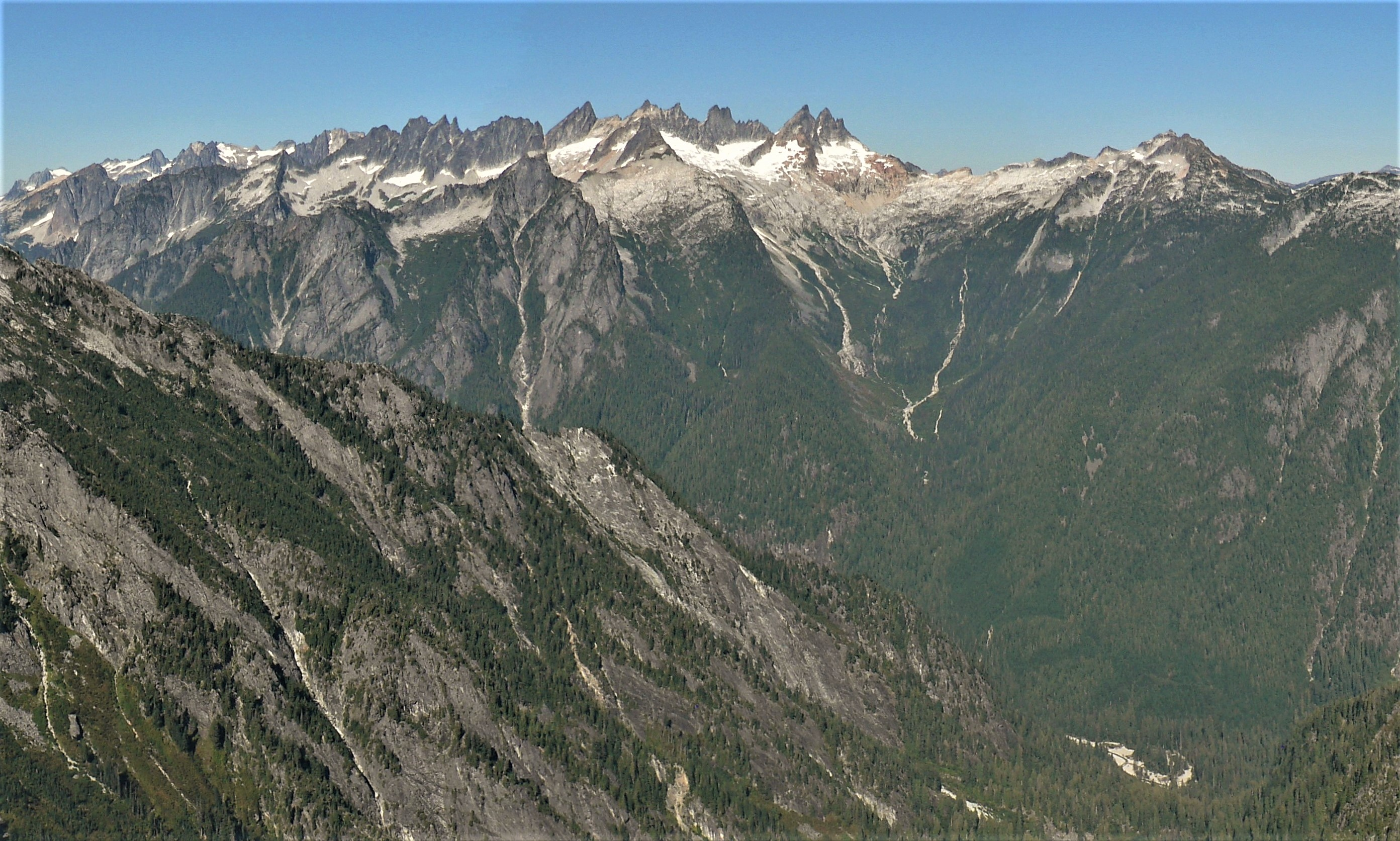
Southern Picket Range seen from Trappers Peak with Glee Peak in upper right corner of frame.

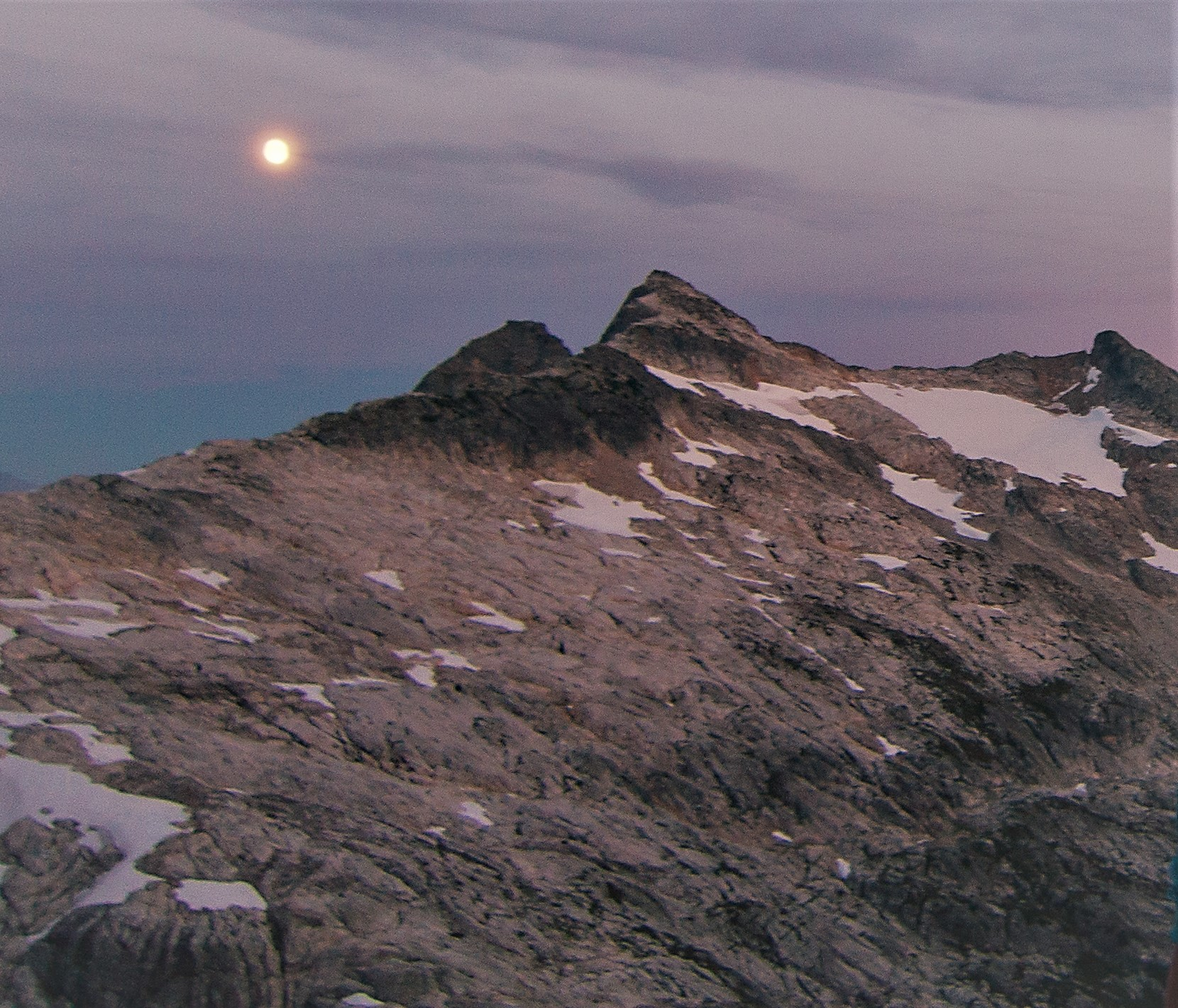
Northwest aspect

== See also ==
- Geography of the North Cascades
