= Azure Lake (Whatcom County, Washington) =

- Location within Washington (state) Location within the United States
- Location: North Cascades National Park, Whatcom County, Washington, United States
- Coordinates: 48°46′07″N 121°15′14″W
- Type: Lake
- Primary outflows: Stetattle Creek
- Basin countries: United States
- Max. length: .60 mi (0.97 km)
- Max. width: .40 mi (0.64 km)
- Surface elevation: 4,058 ft (1,237 m)

Azure Lake is located in North Cascades National Park, in the U. S. state of Washington. Azure Lake is .75 mi (1.21 km) east of McMillan Spire, one mile southwest of Rhino Butte, and one mile north of Glee Peak. It is difficult to access due to being in a remote location in the park, well off any maintained trails.

== See also ==
- Geography of the North Cascades
