= Mount Terror =

Mount Terror can refer to:

- Mount Terror (Antarctica)
- Mount Terror (Washington), United States
