= The Roost (Washington) =

Mountain in Washington (state), United States

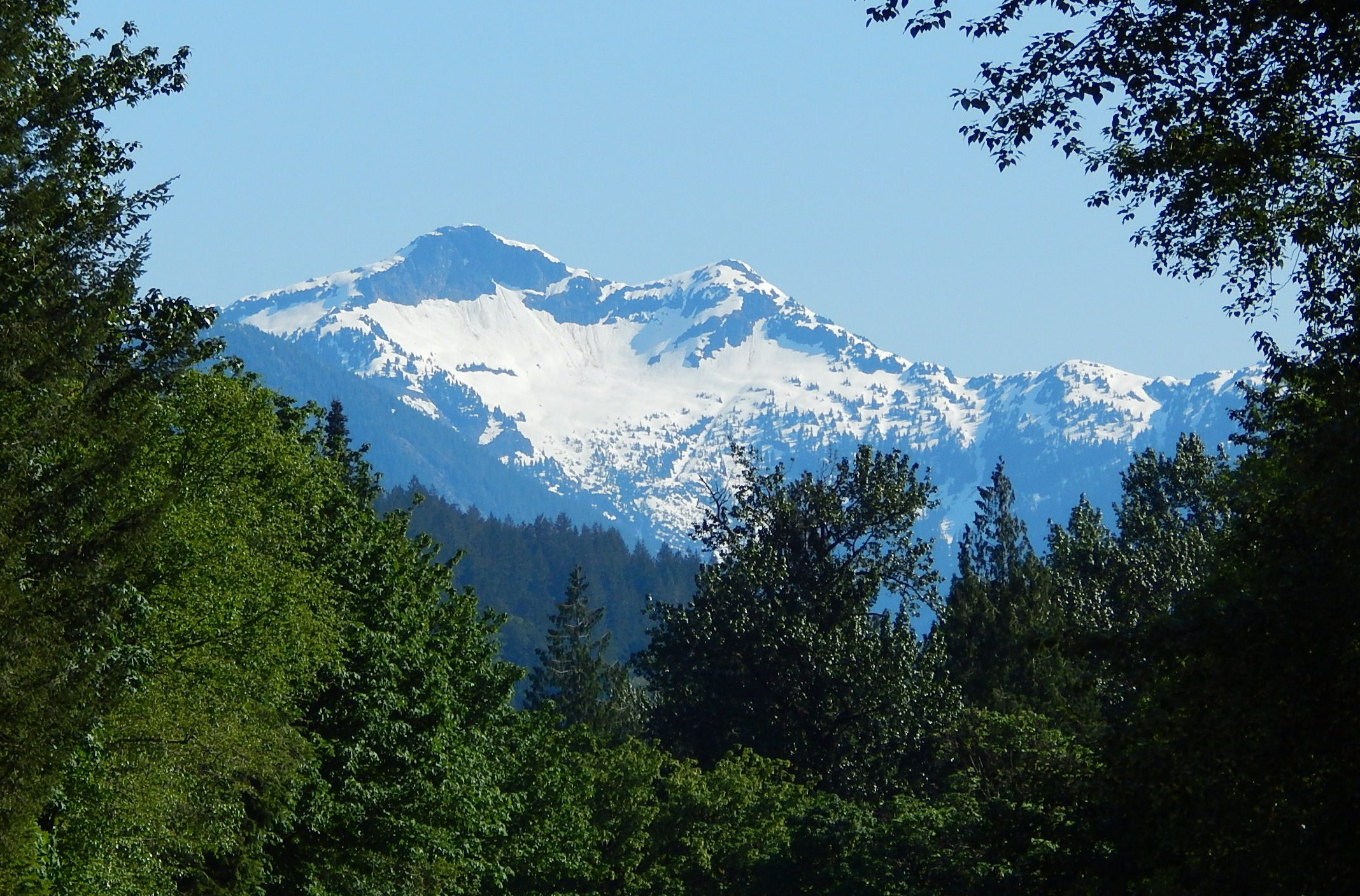
- The Roost seen from North Cascades Highway

Highest point
- Elevation: 6,705 ft (2,044 m)
- Prominence: 865 ft (264 m)
- Parent peak: Glee Peak (7,180 ft)
- Isolation: 1.76 mi (2.83 km)
- Coordinates: 48°43′44″N 121°15′11″W

Geography
- Location within Washington (state) Location within the United States
- Interactive map of The Roost
- Country: United States
- State: Washington
- County: Whatcom
- Protected area: North Cascades National Park
- Parent range: North Cascades
- Topo map: USGS Mount Triumph

Geology
- Rock type: Granodiorite

Climbing
- First ascent: July 12, 1966 by John Roper, Taffy Roper
- Easiest route: Scramble

The Roost is a 6,705 ft summit in the Picket Range which is a sub-range of the North Cascades of Washington, United States. It is located within North Cascades National Park and Stephen Mather Wilderness, and it is situated one mile north of Mount Ross. Like many North Cascades peaks, The Roost is more notable for its large, steep rise above local terrain than for its absolute elevation. The Roost was first climbed on July 12, 1966 by John and Taffy Roper. The nearest higher neighbor is Glee Peak, 1.76 miles (2.83 km) to the north. Precipitation runoff from the mountain drains into the Skagit River.

== Climate ==
The Roost is located in the marine west coast climate zone of western North America. Weather fronts originating in the Pacific Ocean travel northeast toward the Cascade Mountains. As fronts approach the North Cascades, they are forced upward by the peaks of the Cascade Range (orographic lift), causing them to drop their moisture in the form of rain or snowfall onto the Cascades. As a result, the west side of the North Cascades experiences high precipitation, especially during the winter months in the form of snowfall. Because of maritime influence, snow tends to be wet and heavy, resulting in high avalanche danger. During winter months, weather is usually cloudy, but, due to high pressure systems over the Pacific Ocean that intensify during summer months, there is often little or no cloud cover during the summer.

== Geology ==
The North Cascades features some of the most rugged topography in the Cascade Range with craggy peaks, ridges, and deep glacial valleys. Geological events occurring many years ago created the diverse topography and drastic elevation changes over the Cascade Range leading to the various climate differences. These climate differences lead to vegetation variety defining the ecoregions in this area.

The history of the formation of the Cascade Mountains dates back millions of years ago to the late Eocene Epoch. With the North American Plate overriding the Pacific Plate, episodes of volcanic igneous activity persisted. In addition, small fragments of the oceanic and continental lithosphere called terranes created the North Cascades about 50 million years ago.

During the Pleistocene period, glaciation advancing and retreating repeatedly scoured the landscape leaving deposits of rock debris. The U-shaped cross section of the river valleys is a result of recent glaciation. Uplift and faulting in combination with glaciation have been the dominant processes which have created the tall peaks and deep valleys of the North Cascades area.

== See also ==
- Geography of the North Cascades
