= Inspiration Peak (Washington) =

Mountain in Washington (state), United States

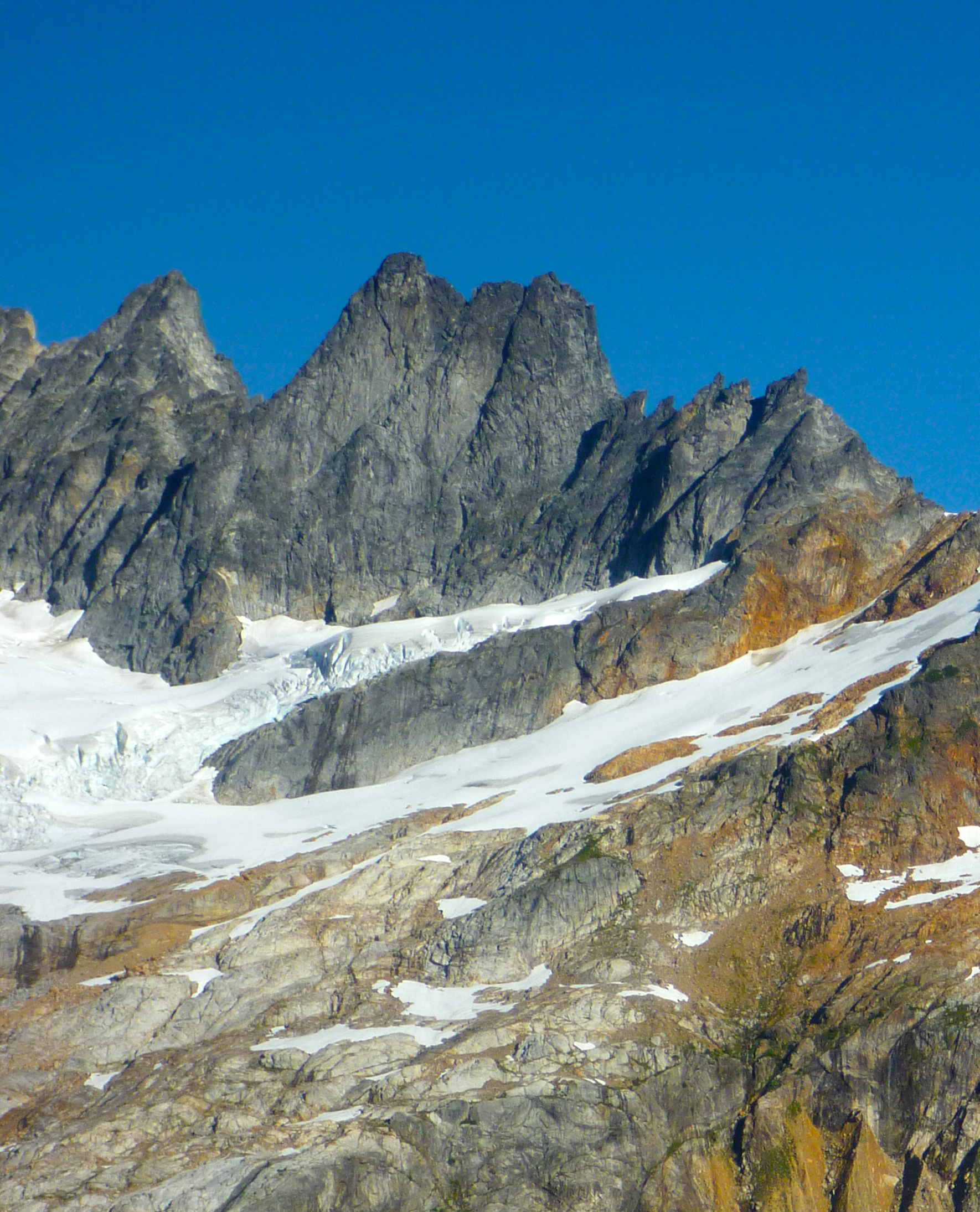
- Inspiration Peak above part of Terror Glacier

Highest point
- Elevation: 7,891 ft (2,405 m)
- Prominence: 320 ft (98 m)
- Parent peak: Mount Degenhardt
- Isolation: 0.15 mi (0.24 km)
- Coordinates: 48°46′16″N 121°17′18″W

Geography
- Location within Washington (state) Location within the United States
- Interactive map of Inspiration Peak
- Country: United States
- State: Washington
- County: Whatcom
- Protected area: North Cascades National Park
- Parent range: Picket Range; Cascade Range
- Topo map: USGS Mount Challenger

Geology
- Rock type: Skagit Gneiss

Climbing
- First ascent: 1940 by brothers Helmy and Fred Beckey
- Easiest route: Climbing YDS 5.6 via West Ridge

Inspiration Peak is a 7,891-foot (2,405-metre) mountain summit located in the Picket Range within North Cascades National Park in the state of Washington. The peak lies 0.28 mi (0.45 km) east of Mount Degenhardt, and 0.47 mi (0.76 km) west of McMillan Spires. Terror Glacier remnants lie to the south of the peaks, and the McMillan Cirque glaciers hang on the north slopes. The first ascent of Inspiration Peak was made in 1940 by Fred Beckey and his brother Helmy via the West Ridge. Inspiration Peak can be seen from the North Cascades National Park Newhalem visitor center, weather permitting.

== Climate ==
Inspiration Peak is located in the marine west coast climate zone of western North America. Weather fronts originating in the Pacific Ocean move northeast toward the Cascade Mountains. As fronts approach the North Cascades, they are forced upward by the peaks of the Cascade Range (orographic lift), causing them to drop their moisture in the form of rain or snowfall onto the Cascades. As a result, the west side of the North Cascades experiences high precipitation, especially during the winter months in the form of snowfall. Because of maritime influence, snow tends to be wet and heavy, resulting in high avalanche danger. During winter months, weather is usually cloudy, but due to high pressure systems over the Pacific Ocean that intensify during summer months, there is often little or no cloud cover during the summer.

== Geology ==
The North Cascades features some of the most rugged topography in the Cascade Range with craggy peaks, spires, ridges, and deep glacial valleys. Geological events occurring many years ago created the diverse topography and drastic elevation changes over the Cascade Range leading to the various climate differences.

The history of the formation of the Cascade Mountains dates back millions of years ago to the late Eocene Epoch. With the North American Plate overriding the Pacific Plate, episodes of volcanic igneous activity persisted. In addition, small fragments of the oceanic and continental lithosphere called terranes created the North Cascades about 50 million years ago.

During the Pleistocene period dating back over two million years ago, glaciation advancing and retreating repeatedly scoured the landscape leaving deposits of rock debris. The U-shaped cross section of the river valleys is a result of recent glaciation. Uplift and faulting in combination with glaciation have been the dominant processes which have created the tall peaks and deep valleys of the North Cascades area.

== Gallery ==
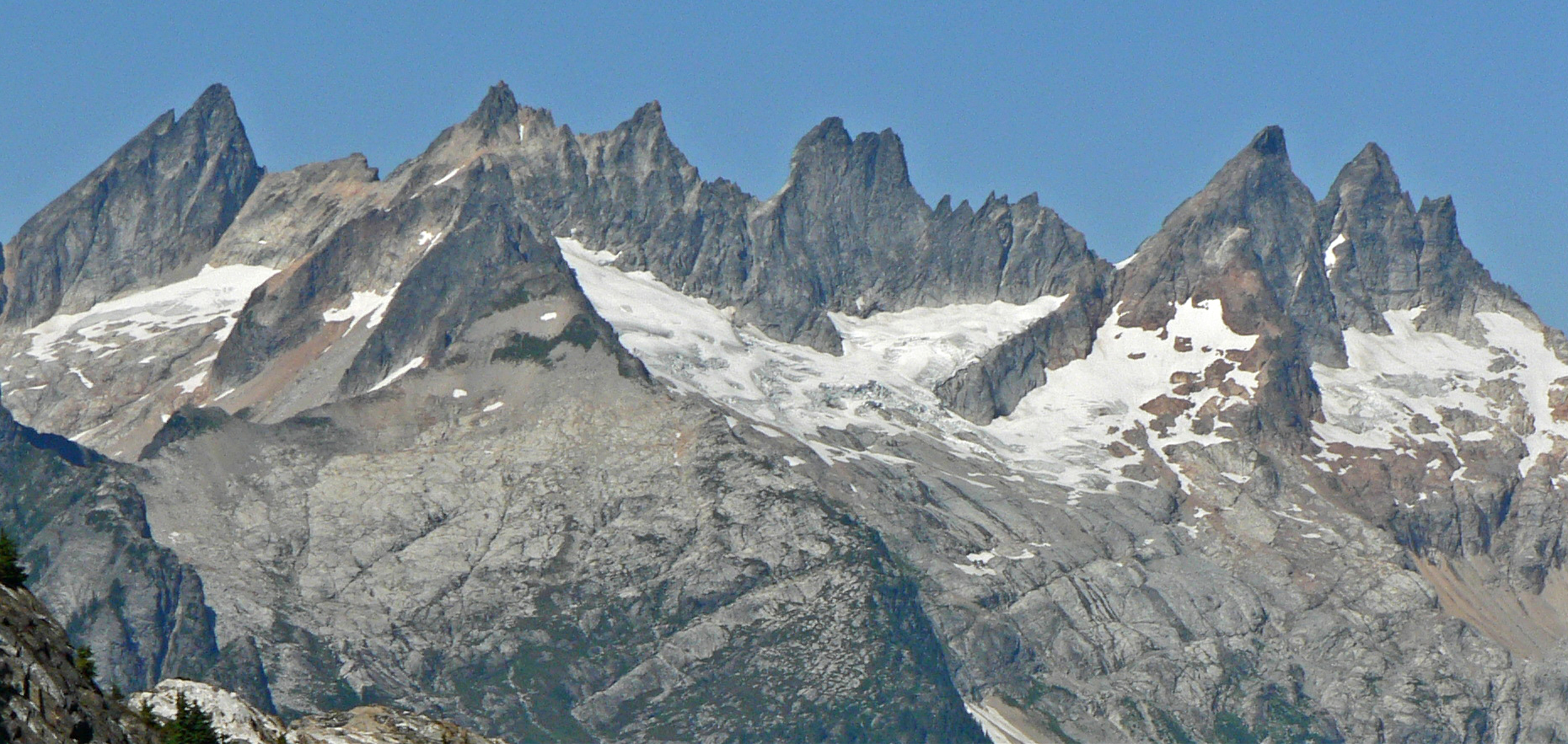
Terror, Degenhardt, Inspiration, McMillan Spires seen from the south

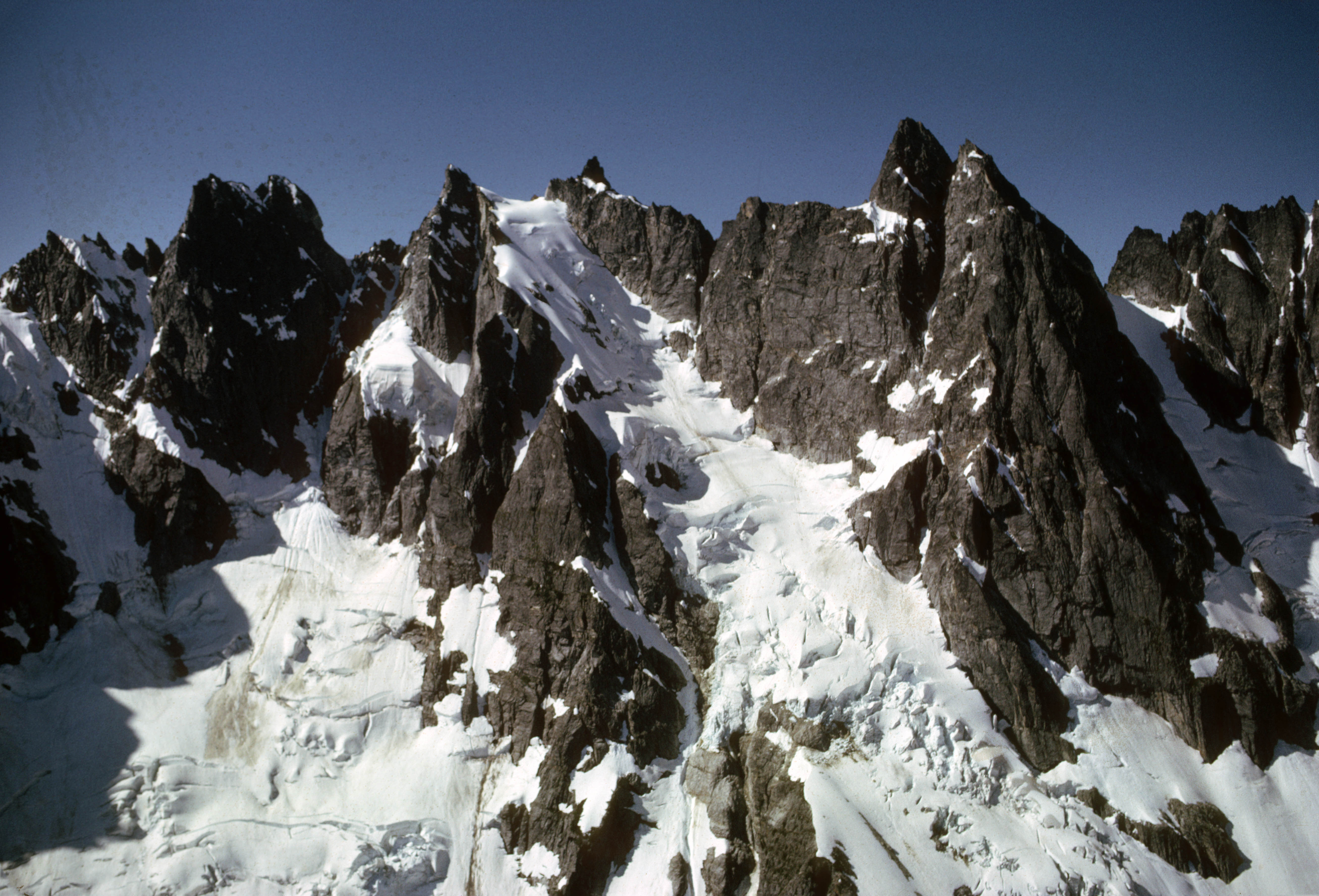
Inspiration (left), Degenhardt, Terror from north

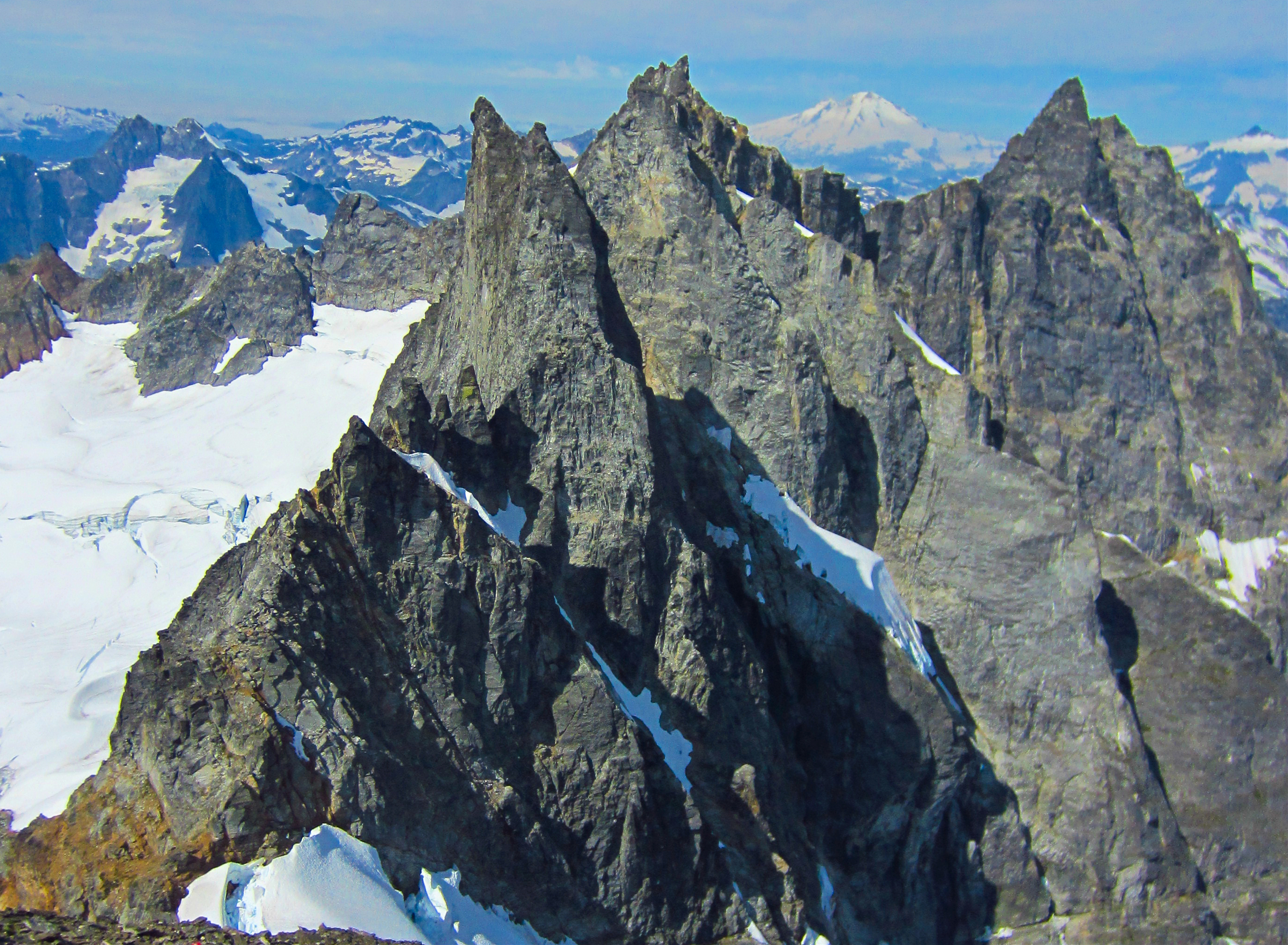
Inspiration, Degenhardt centered, Terror to right, viewed from McMillan Spire
