= Davis Peak (Washington) =

Mountain in Washington (state), United States

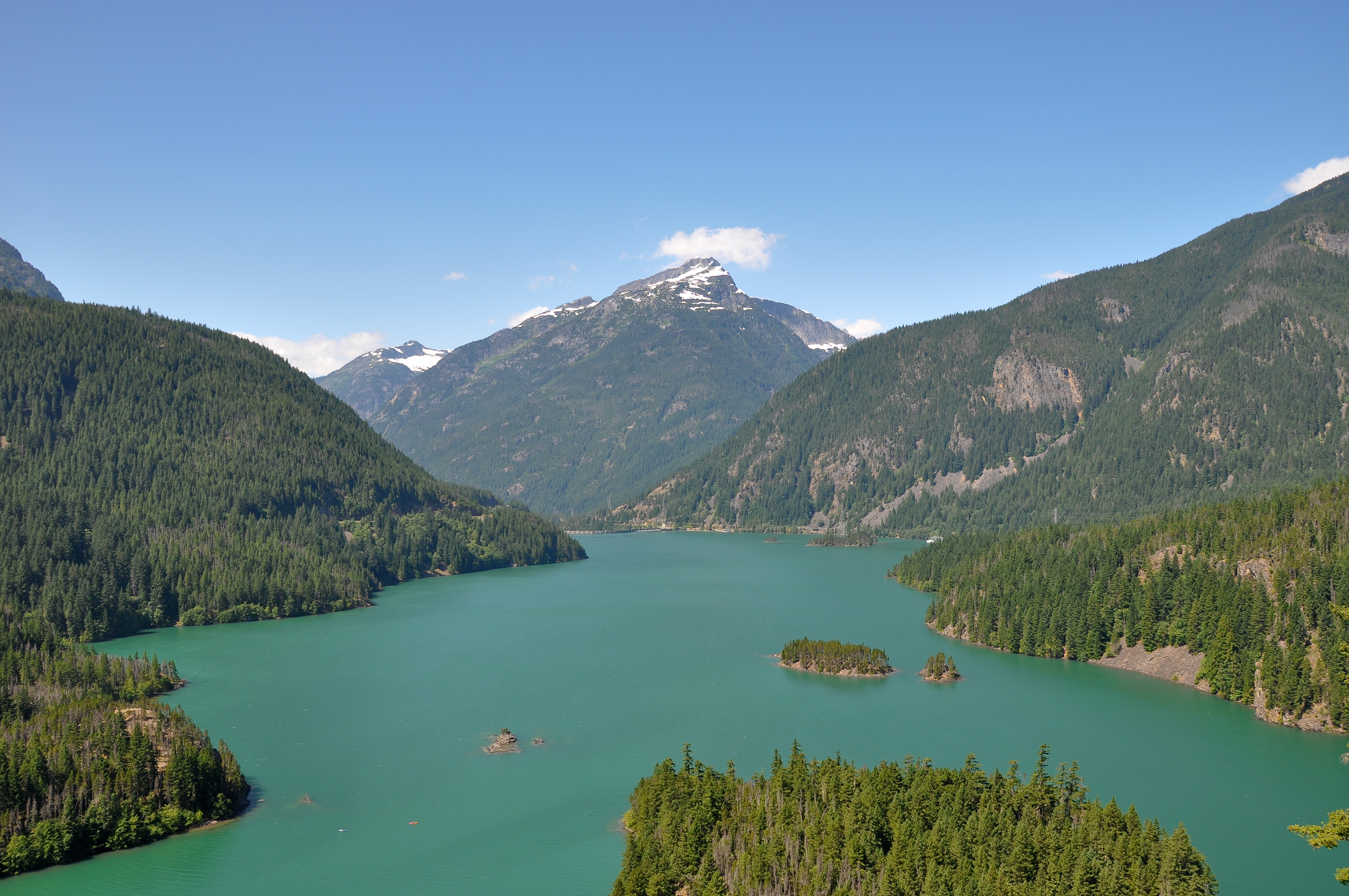
- Davis Peak behind Diablo Lake, August 2011

Highest point
- Elevation: 7,055 ft (2,150 m) NAVD 88
- Prominence: 1,771 ft (540 m)
- Coordinates: 48°43′46″N 121°12′10″W

Geography
- Location: Whatcom County, Washington, U.S.
- Parent range: North Cascades
- Topo map: USGS Diablo Dam

Climbing
- First ascent: 1904 by David Ledgerwood, Walter B. Reaburn
- Easiest route: South Ridge (bushwhack/scramble)

Davis Peak is a mountain just north of Gorge Lake in North Cascades National Park, in the US state of Washington. It is located just south of the Picket Range. While not of particularly high elevation, even for the North Cascades, it is notable for its large, steep local relief, and in particular for its huge Northeast Face, which drops 5,250 ft (1,600 m) in one horizontal mile (1.6 km). This is one of the two largest vertical drops in one horizontal mile in the contiguous United States, the other being the North Face of Kinnerly Peak.

Davis Peak had been known as Stetattle Peak until the Reaburn climbing party of 1904 renamed it in honor of the early homesteading family of Lucinda Davis. The Davis family had built and ran a roadhouse for trappers, miners and other travelers at the base of the peak, near present-day Diablo, prior to the arrival of roads or rail, circa 1900.

== Climate ==
Davis Peak is located in the marine west coast climate zone of western North America. Most weather fronts originate in the Pacific Ocean, and travel northeast toward the Cascade Mountains. As fronts approach the North Cascades, they are forced upward by the peaks of the Cascade Range, causing them to drop their moisture in the form of rain or snowfall onto the Cascades (Orographic lift). As a result, the west side of the North Cascades experiences high precipitation, especially during the winter months in the form of snowfall. During winter months, weather is usually cloudy, but, due to high pressure systems over the Pacific Ocean that intensify during summer months, there is often little or no cloud cover during the summer. Because of maritime influence, snow tends to be wet and heavy, resulting in high avalanche danger.

== Geology ==
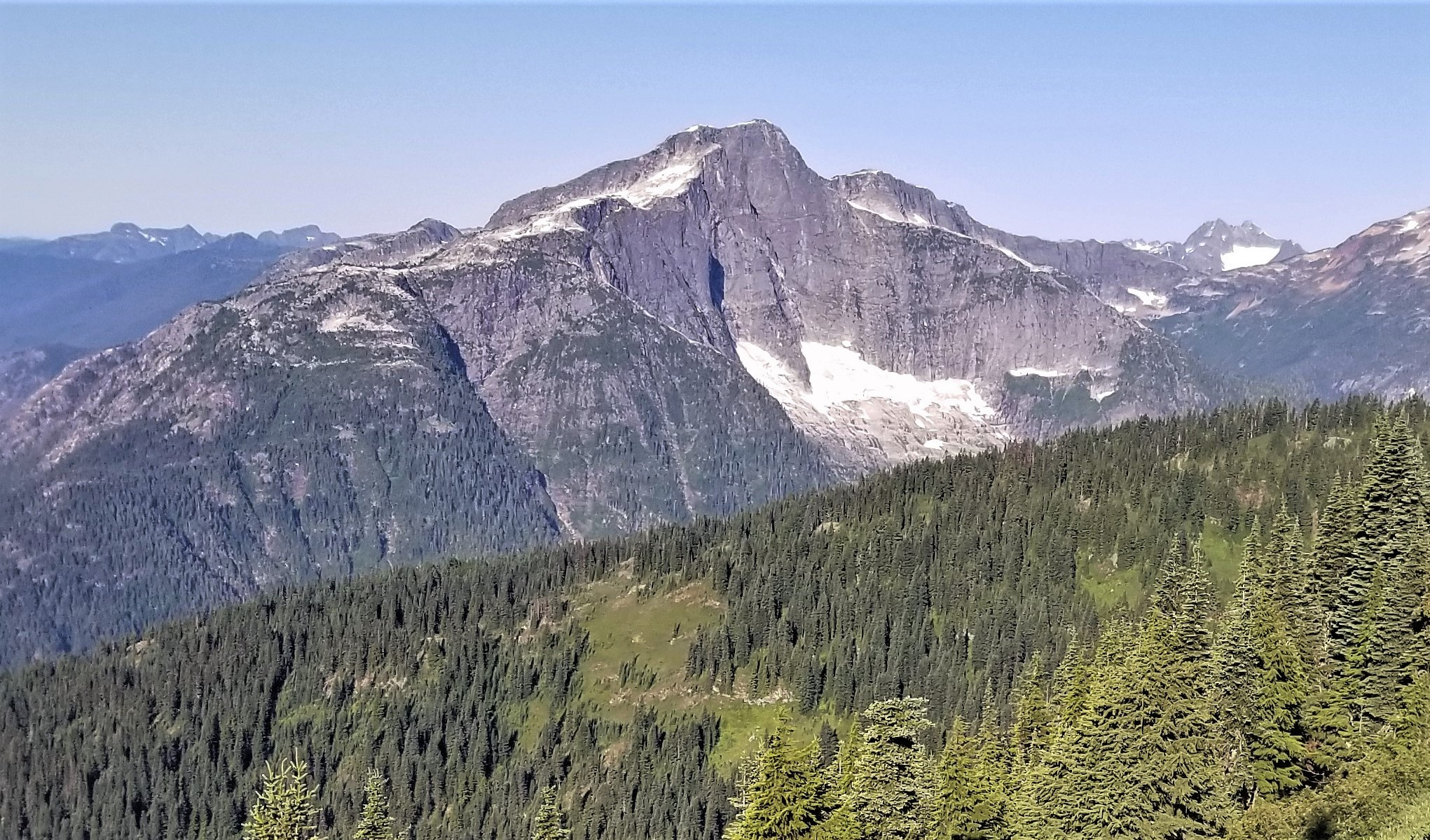
Northeast face of Davis Peak seen from Sourdough Mountain

The North Cascades features some of the most rugged topography in the Cascade Range with craggy peaks, spires, ridges, and deep glacial valleys. Geological events occurring many years ago created the diverse topography and drastic elevation changes over the Cascade Range leading to the various climate differences.

The history of the formation of the Cascade Mountains dates back millions of years ago to the late Eocene Epoch. With the North American Plate overriding the Pacific Plate, episodes of volcanic igneous activity persisted. In addition, small fragments of the oceanic and continental lithosphere called terranes created the North Cascades about 50 million years ago.

During the Pleistocene period dating back over two million years ago, glaciation advancing and retreating repeatedly scoured the landscape leaving deposits of rock debris. The U-shaped cross section of the river valleys is a result of recent glaciation. Uplift and faulting in combination with glaciation have been the dominant processes which have created the tall peaks and deep valleys of the North Cascades area.

== See also ==
- Geography of the North Cascades
- Geology of the Pacific Northwest
- Glee Peak
