= Mount Ross =

Mountain in Washington (state), United States

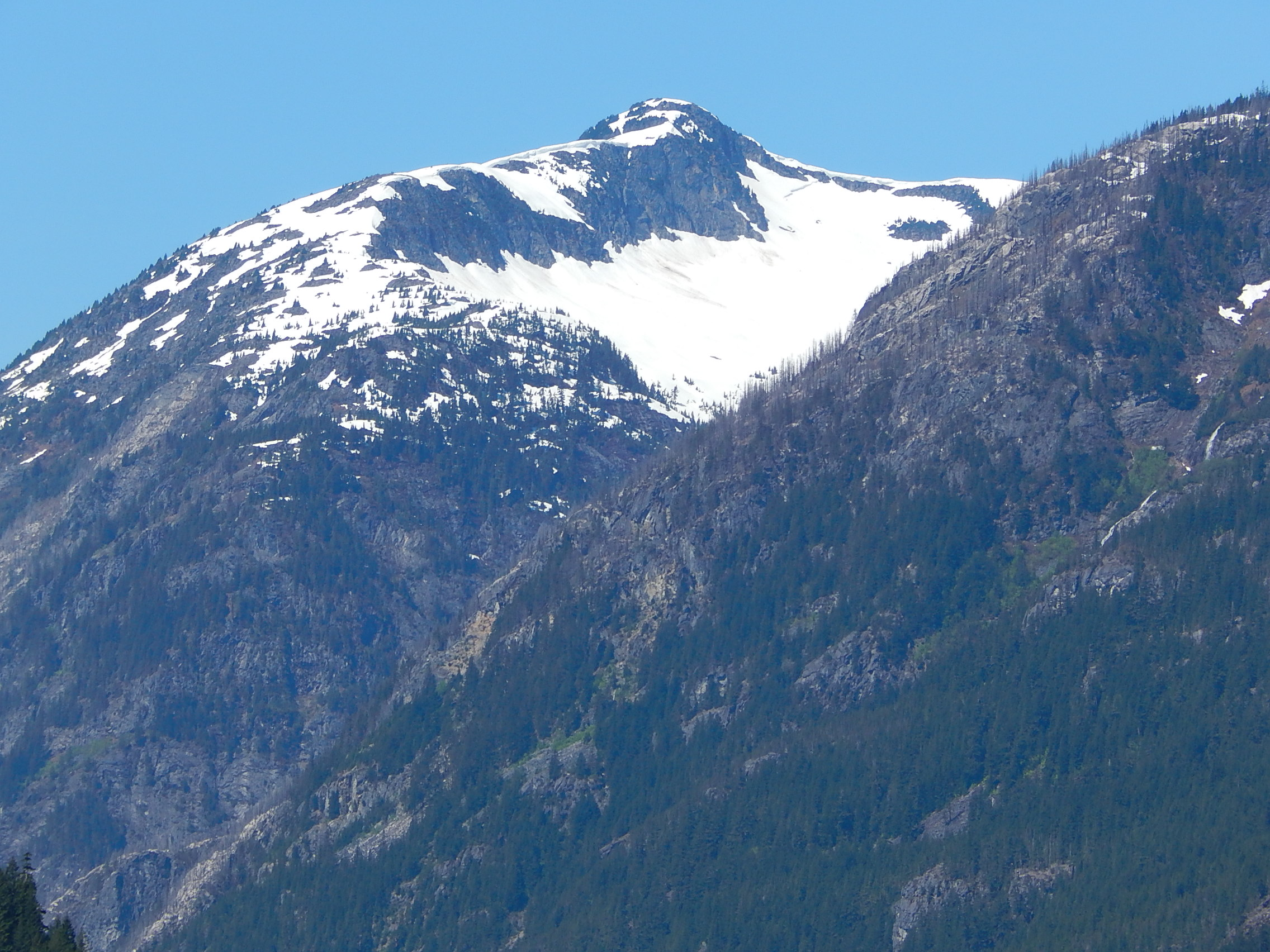
- Mount Ross seen from Diablo Lake Overlook

Highest point
- Elevation: 6,052 ft (1,845 m)
- Prominence: 452 ft (138 m)
- Parent peak: The Roost (6,705 ft)
- Isolation: 1.40 mi (2.25 km)
- Coordinates: 48°42′33″N 121°14′42″W

Naming
- Etymology: James Delmage Ross

Geography
- Location within Washington (state) Location within the United States
- Interactive map of Mount Ross
- Country: United States
- State: Washington
- County: Whatcom
- Protected area: North Cascades National Park
- Parent range: Cascade Range; North Cascades
- Topo map: USGS Diablo Dam

Geology
- Rock type: Orthogneiss

Climbing
- First ascent: August 17, 1969 by Jack Roper, Maurine Roper, Jan Bergerson
- Easiest route: scrambling

Mount Ross is a 6,052-foot (1,845 m) mountain summit located in the North Cascades, in Whatcom County, Washington, United States.

== Description ==
Mount Ross is situated within North Cascades National Park and Stephen Mather Wilderness. It rises steeply from the North Cascades Highway and Newhalem, Washington, which are both set at the southern foot of the mountain. Like many North Cascades peaks, Mount Ross is more notable for its large, steep rise above local terrain than for its absolute elevation. Topographic relief is significant as the southwest aspect rises 5,400 feet (1,600 m) above Goodell Creek in 1.5 miles (2.4 km), and the southeast aspect rises 5,400 feet (1,600 m) above the Skagit River in 1.5 miles (2.4 km). The nearest higher peak is The Roost, 1.4 miles (2.3 km) to the north. Precipitation runoff from the mountain drains into the Skagit.

== History ==
This geographical feature's toponym has been officially adopted by the U.S. Board on Geographic Names to honor James Delmage Ross (1872–1939), the superintendent of the Skagit River Hydroelectric Project. Ross Dam and Ross Lake also bear his name. Mount Ross was first climbed on August 17, 1969, by Jack Roper, Maurine Roper, and Jan Bergerson.

== Climate ==
Mount Ross is located in the marine west coast climate zone of western North America. Weather fronts originating in the Pacific Ocean move northeast toward the Cascade Mountains. As fronts approach the North Cascades, they are forced upward by the peaks of the Cascade Range (orographic lift), causing them to drop their moisture in the form of rain or snowfall onto the Cascades. As a result, the west side of the North Cascades experiences high precipitation, especially during the winter months in the form of snowfall. Because of maritime influence, snow tends to be wet and heavy, resulting in high avalanche danger. During winter months, weather is usually cloudy, but due to high pressure systems over the Pacific Ocean that intensify during summer months, there is often little or no cloud cover during the summer.

== Geology ==
The North Cascades features some of the most rugged topography in the Cascade Range with craggy peaks, ridges, and deep glacial valleys. Geological events occurring many years ago created the diverse topography and drastic elevation changes over the Cascade Range leading to the various climate differences. These climate differences lead to vegetation variety defining the ecoregions in this area.

The history of the formation of the Cascade Mountains dates back millions of years ago to the late Eocene Epoch. With the North American Plate overriding the Pacific Plate, episodes of volcanic igneous activity persisted. In addition, small fragments of the oceanic and continental lithosphere called terranes created the North Cascades about 50 million years ago.

During the Pleistocene period dating back over two million years ago, glaciation advancing and retreating repeatedly scoured the landscape leaving deposits of rock debris. The U-shaped cross section of the river valleys is a result of recent glaciation. Uplift and faulting in combination with glaciation have been the dominant processes which have created the tall peaks and deep valleys of the North Cascades area.

== Gallery ==
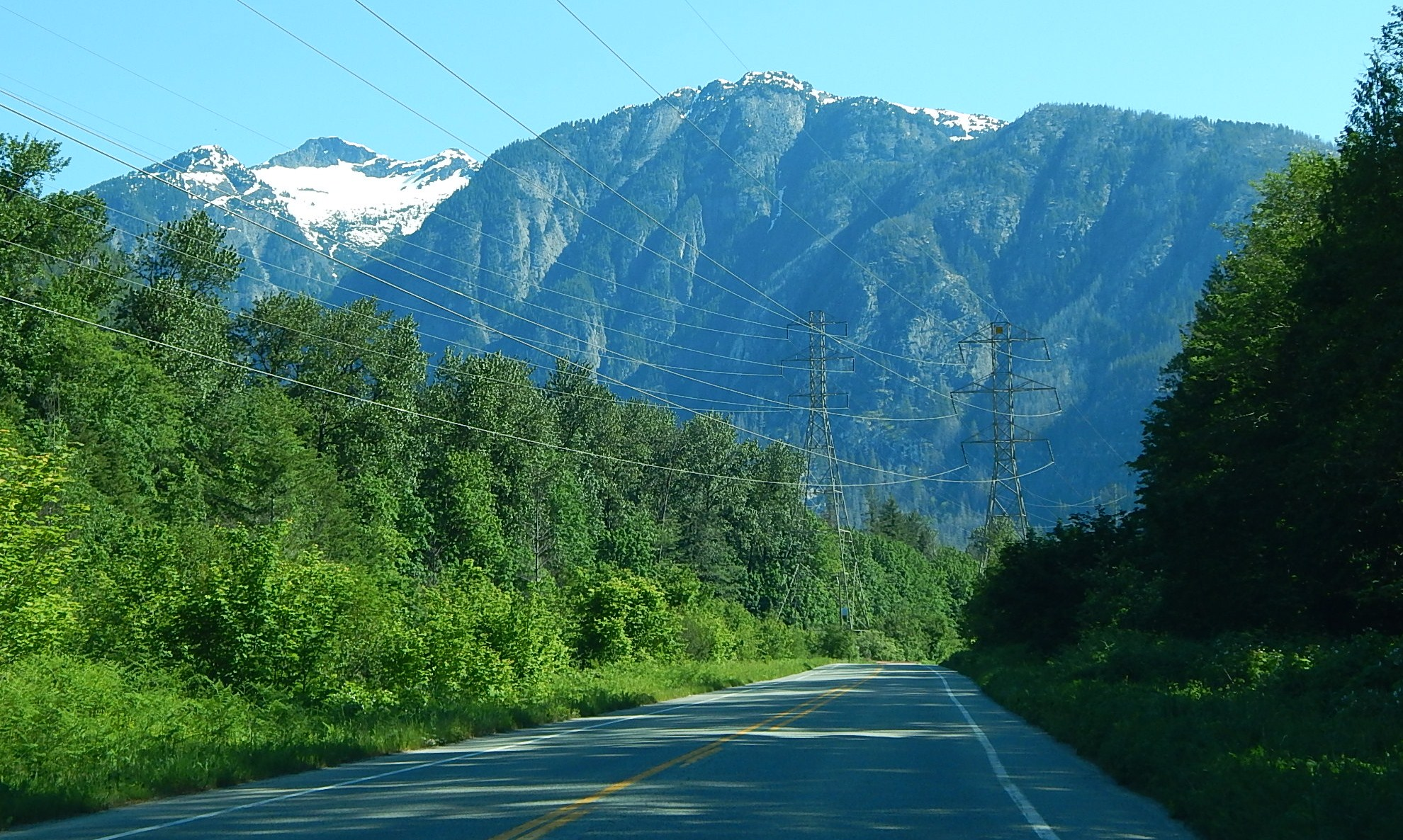
Mount Ross (center) and The Roost (left) seen from the North Cascades Highway

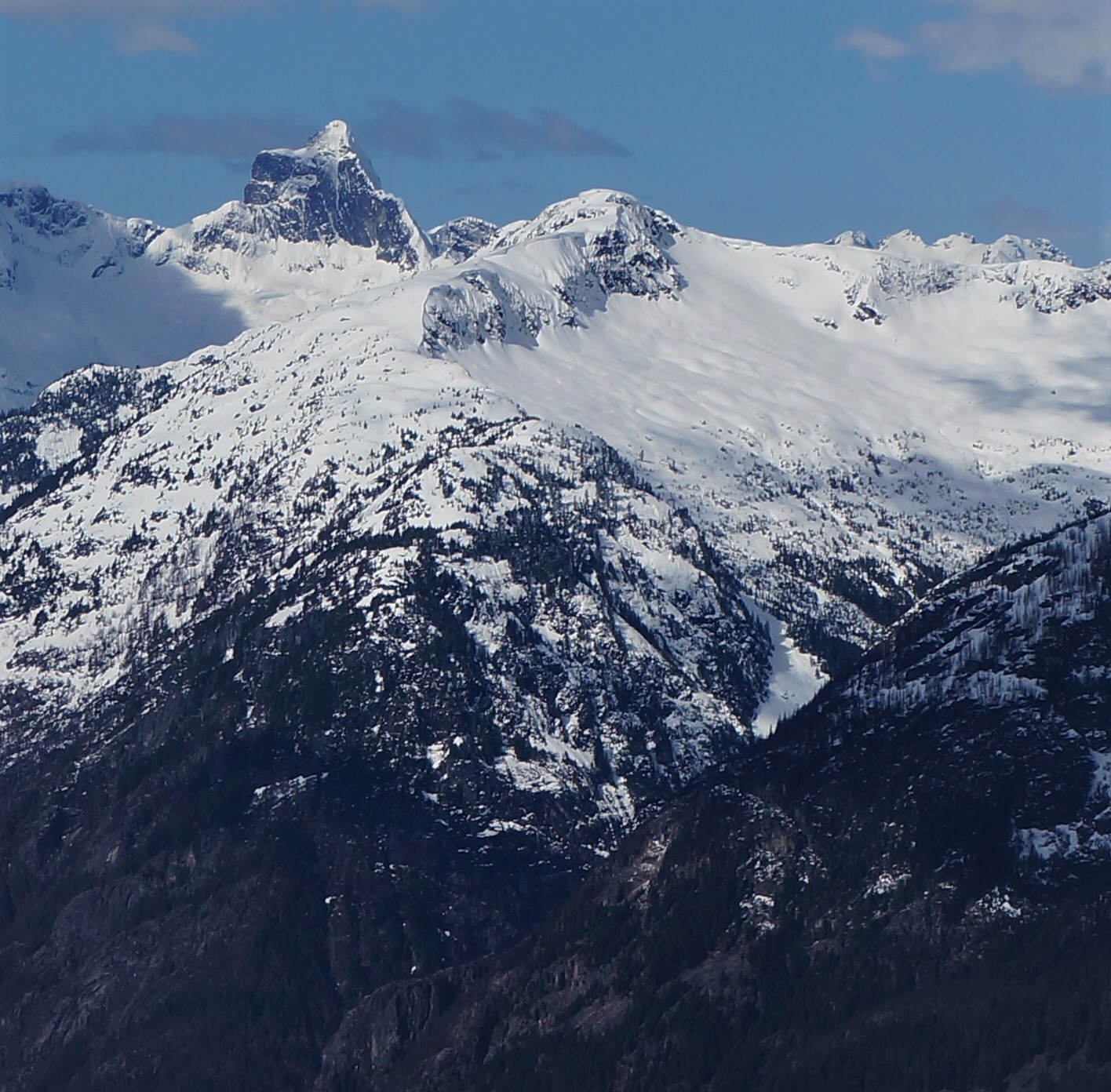
Mt. Ross (centered) and Mt. Triumph (behind, left), seen from Ruby Mountain

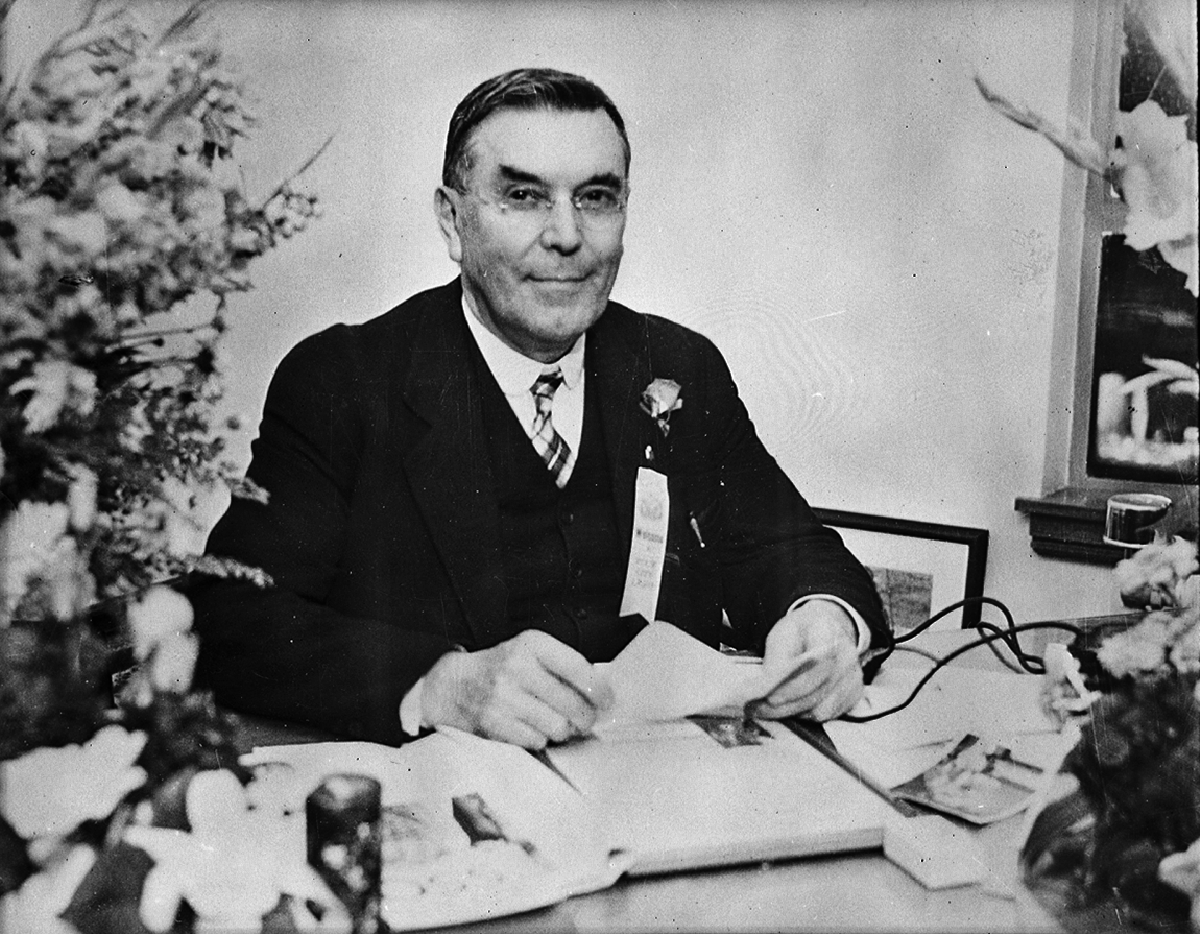
J.D. Ross, 1930

== See also ==
Geography of the North Cascades
