= Terror Glacier (Washington) =

Glacier in the state of Washington

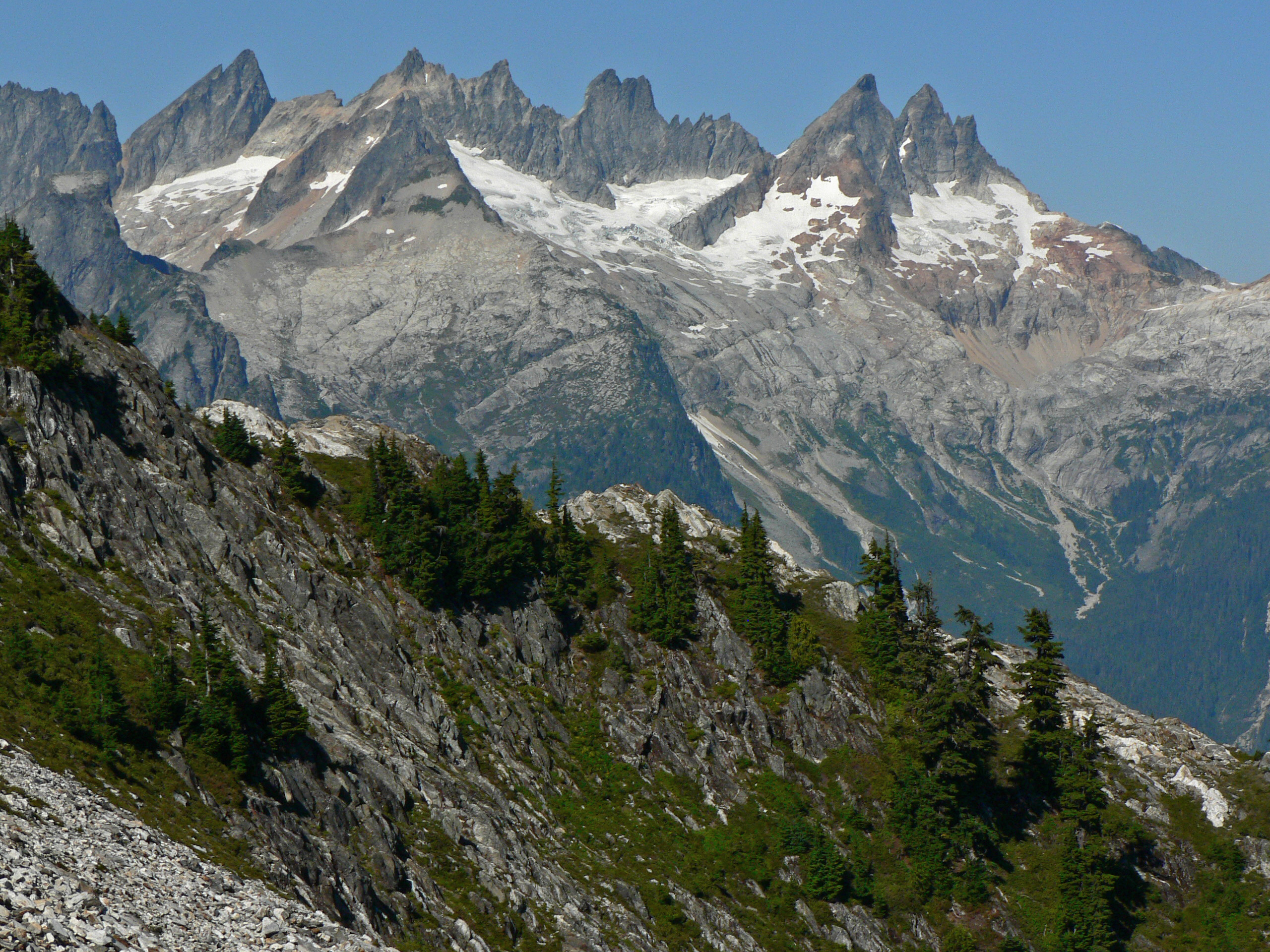
- Terror Glacier at center

- Location within Washington (state)
- Type: Cirque glacier
- Location: Whatcom County, Washington, U.S.
- Coordinates: 48°45′59″N 121°17′19″W
- Length: .40 mi (0.64 km)
- Terminus: Barren rock
- Status: Retreating

Terror Glacier is in North Cascades National Park in the U.S. state of Washington, on south slope of Mount Degenhardt. Mount Terror is .25 mi (0.40 km) to the northwest. The precipitous McMillan Spire is to the immediate northeast.

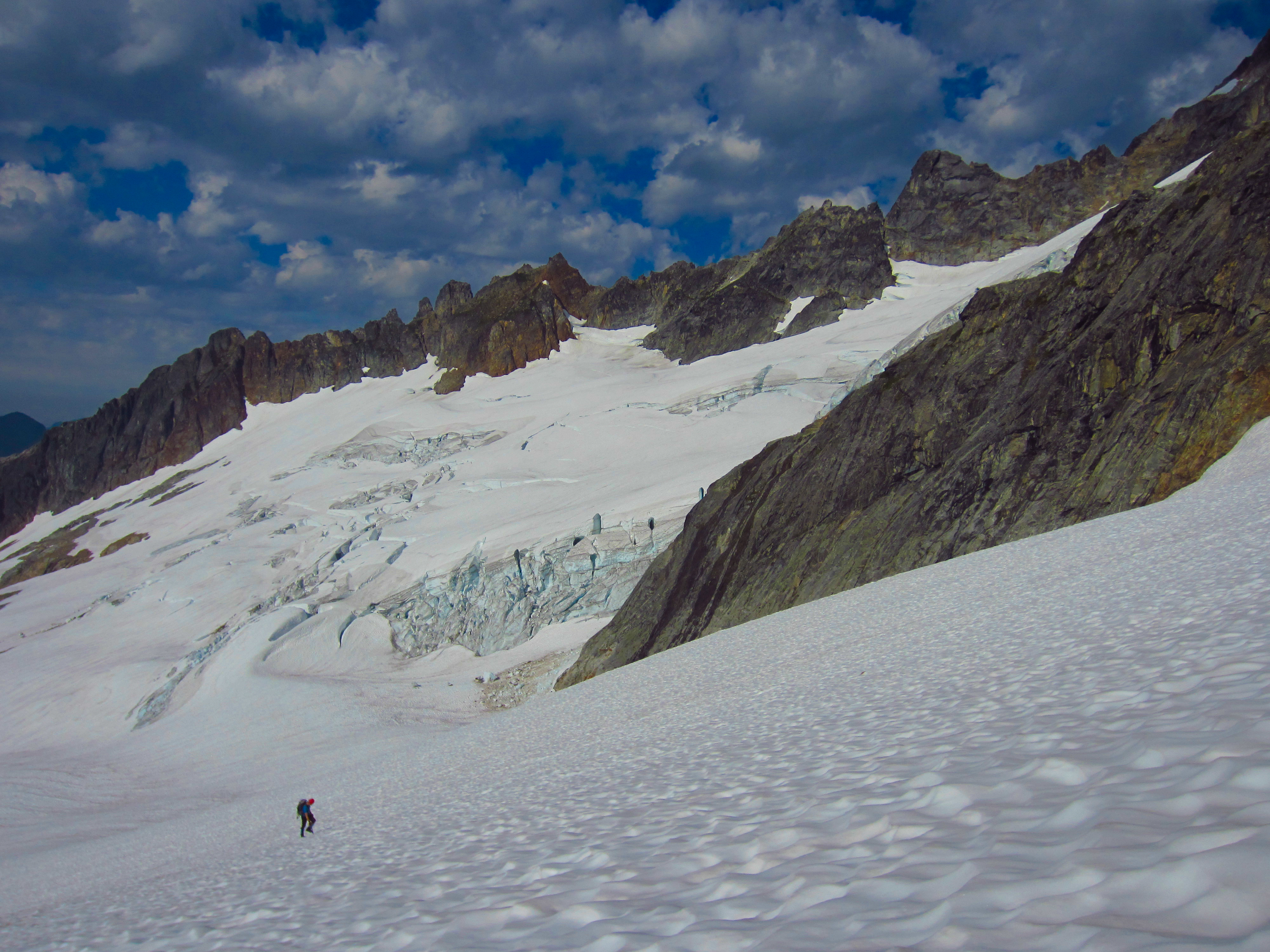
Terror Glacier and The Barrier

== See also ==
- List of glaciers in the United States
