= Mount Terror (Washington) =

Mountain in Washington (state), United States

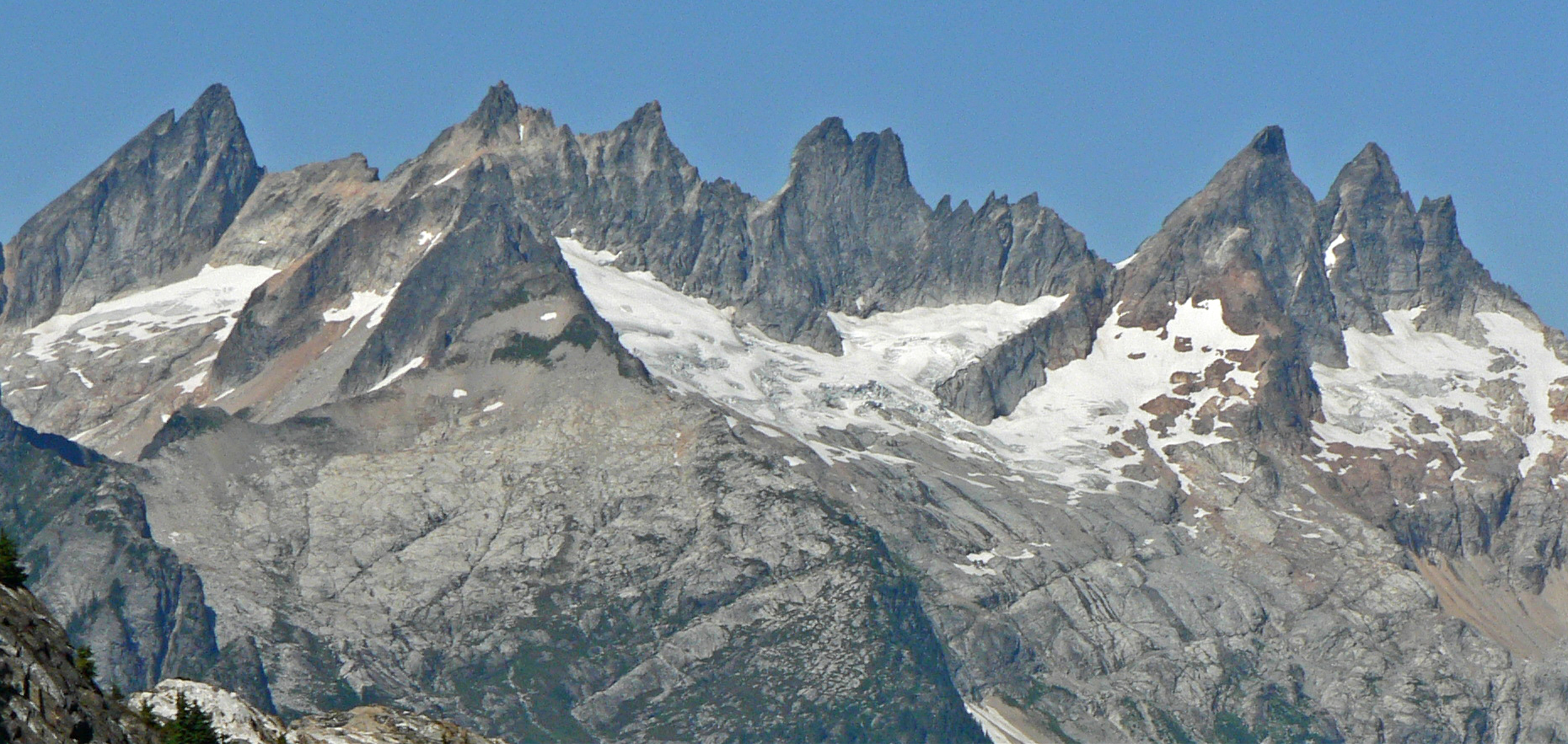
- Mount Terror is on the far left

Highest point
- Elevation: 8,151 ft (2,484 m) NGVD 29
- Prominence: 1,911 ft (582 m)
- Coordinates: 48°46′27″N 121°17′58″W

Geography
- Location: Whatcom County, Washington, U.S.
- Parent range: Picket Range, North Cascades
- Topo map: USGS Mount Challenger

Climbing
- First ascent: 1932 by William Degenhardt and Herbert Strandberg
- Easiest route: rock climb or scramble

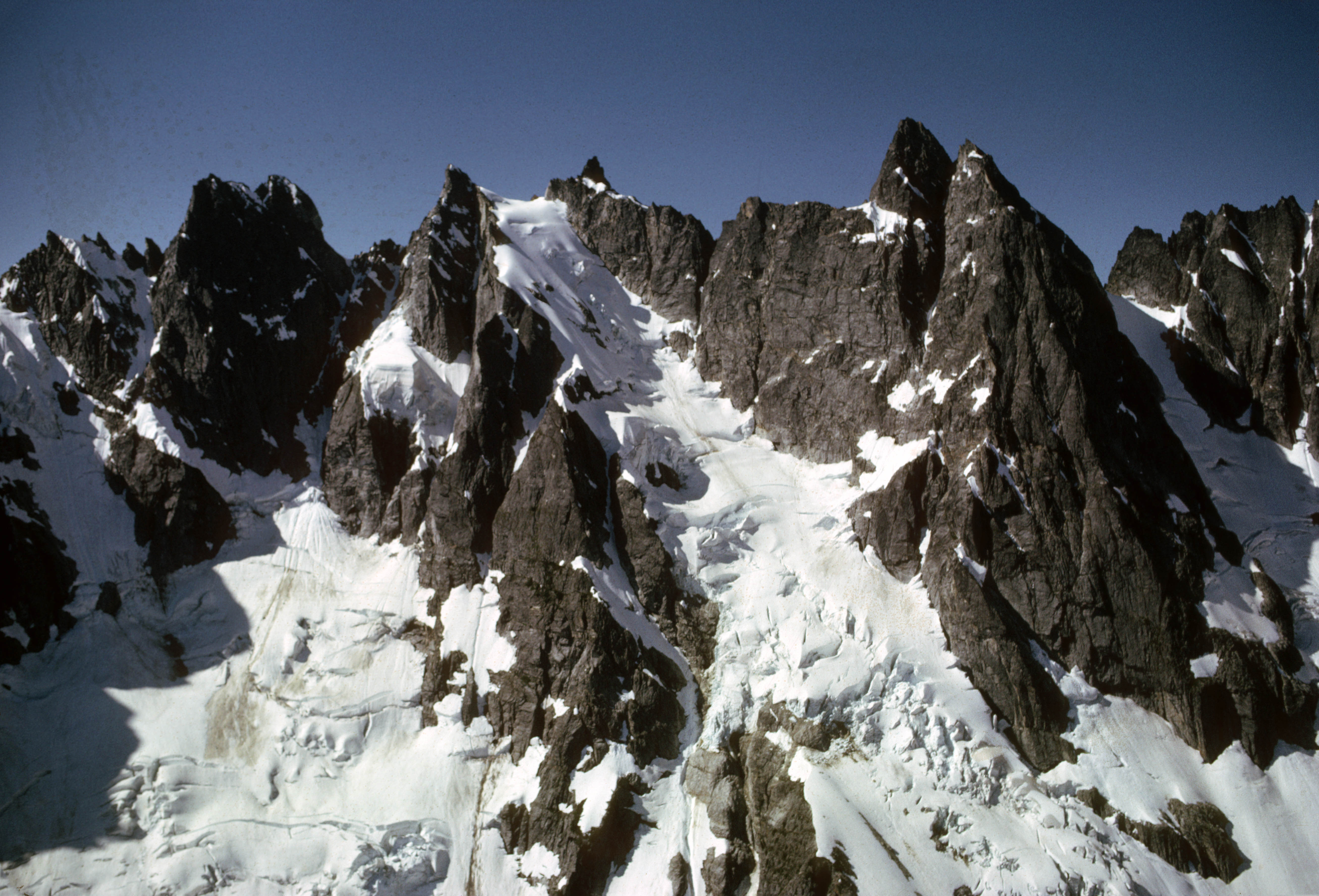
Inspiration Peak left, Mount Degenhardt centered, and Mount Terror on right, seen from north

Mount Terror is a mountain of the Cascade Range, located in the northwestern corner of Washington in Whatcom County. The peak is in North Cascades National Park, about 15.7 miles (25.3 km) south of the Canada–United States border.

== Nearby mountains ==
- Mount Triumph
- Mount Despair
- Mount Degenhardt
- Mount Shuksan
- Mount Blum
- Mount Prophet

Mount Terror is the highest peak of the southern Picket Range. The Pickets, north and south, are considered the most Alpine region of the Cascades. Mount Terror was first climbed in 1932 by William Degenhardt and Herbert Strandberg of the Seattle Mountaineers. Thirty years later Ed Cooper led the first ascent of the more challenging north face.

== Climate ==
Mount Terror is located in the marine west coast climate zone of western North America. Most weather fronts originate in the Pacific Ocean, and travel northeast toward the Cascade Mountains. As fronts approach the North Cascades, they are forced upward by the peaks of the Cascade Range (Orographic lift), causing them to drop their moisture in the form of rain or snowfall onto the Cascades. As a result, the west side of the North Cascades experiences high precipitation, especially during the winter months in the form of snowfall. Due to its temperate climate and proximity to the Pacific Ocean, areas west of the Cascade Crest very rarely experience temperatures below 0 °F (−18 °C) or above 80 °F (27 °C). During winter months, weather is usually cloudy, but, due to high pressure systems over the Pacific Ocean that intensify during summer months, there is often little or no cloud cover during the summer. Because of maritime influence, snow tends to be wet and heavy, resulting in high avalanche danger.

== Geology ==
The North Cascades features some of the most rugged topography in the Cascade Range with craggy peaks, ridges, and deep glacial valleys. Geological events occurring many years ago created the diverse topography and drastic elevation changes over the Cascade Range leading to the various climate differences.

The history of the formation of the Cascade Mountains dates back millions of years ago to the late Eocene Epoch. With the North American Plate overriding the Pacific Plate, episodes of volcanic igneous activity persisted. In addition, small fragments of the oceanic and continental lithosphere called terranes created the North Cascades about 50 million years ago.

During the Pleistocene period dating back over two million years ago, glaciation advancing and retreating repeatedly scoured the landscape leaving deposits of rock debris. The U-shaped cross section of the river valleys is a result of recent glaciation. Uplift and faulting in combination with glaciation have been the dominant processes which have created the tall peaks and deep valleys of the North Cascades area.
