= McMillan Spire =

Mountain in Washington (state), United States

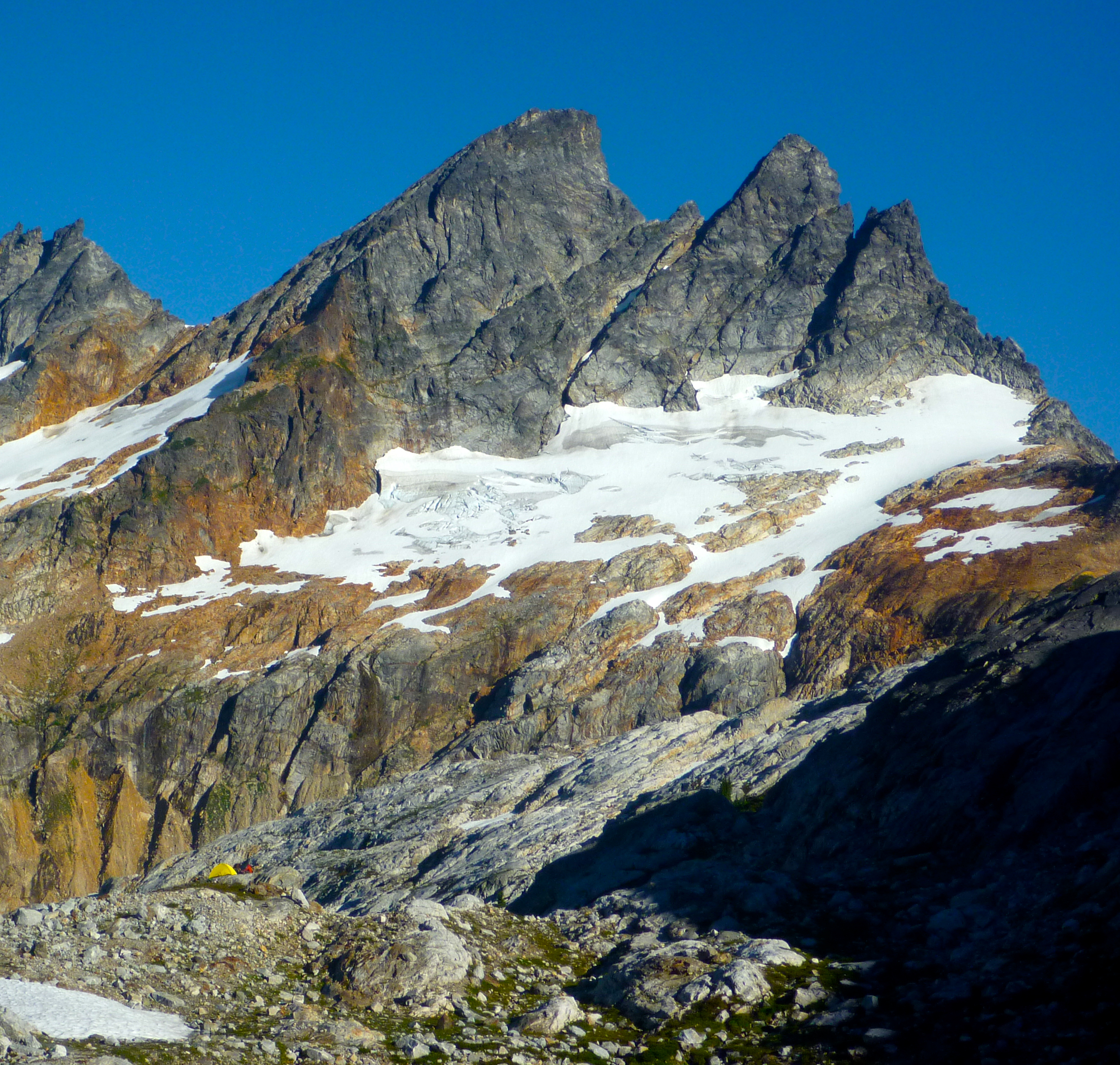
- McMillan Spires in the Picket Range

Highest point
- Elevation: 8,004 ft (2,440 m)
- Prominence: 600 ft (180 m)
- Coordinates: 48°46′26″N 121°16′42″W

Geography
- Location within Washington (state) Location within the United States
- Location: Whatcom County, Washington, U.S.
- Parent range: Cascade Range
- Topo map: USGS Mount Challenger

Climbing
- First ascent: 1940 Fred Beckey

McMillan Spire (8,004 feet (2,440 m)) is a mountain peak in the Picket Range in the U.S. state of Washington and within North Cascades National Park. The peak lies .75 mi (1.21 km) east of Mount Degenhardt, and 0.47 mi (0.76 km) east of Inspiration Peak. The subpeak known as East McMillan Spire (7,992 ft (2,436 m)) is .14 mi (0.23 km) east of McMillan Spire and they are collectively referred to as the McMillan Spires. The Terror Glacier lies to the west of the peak.

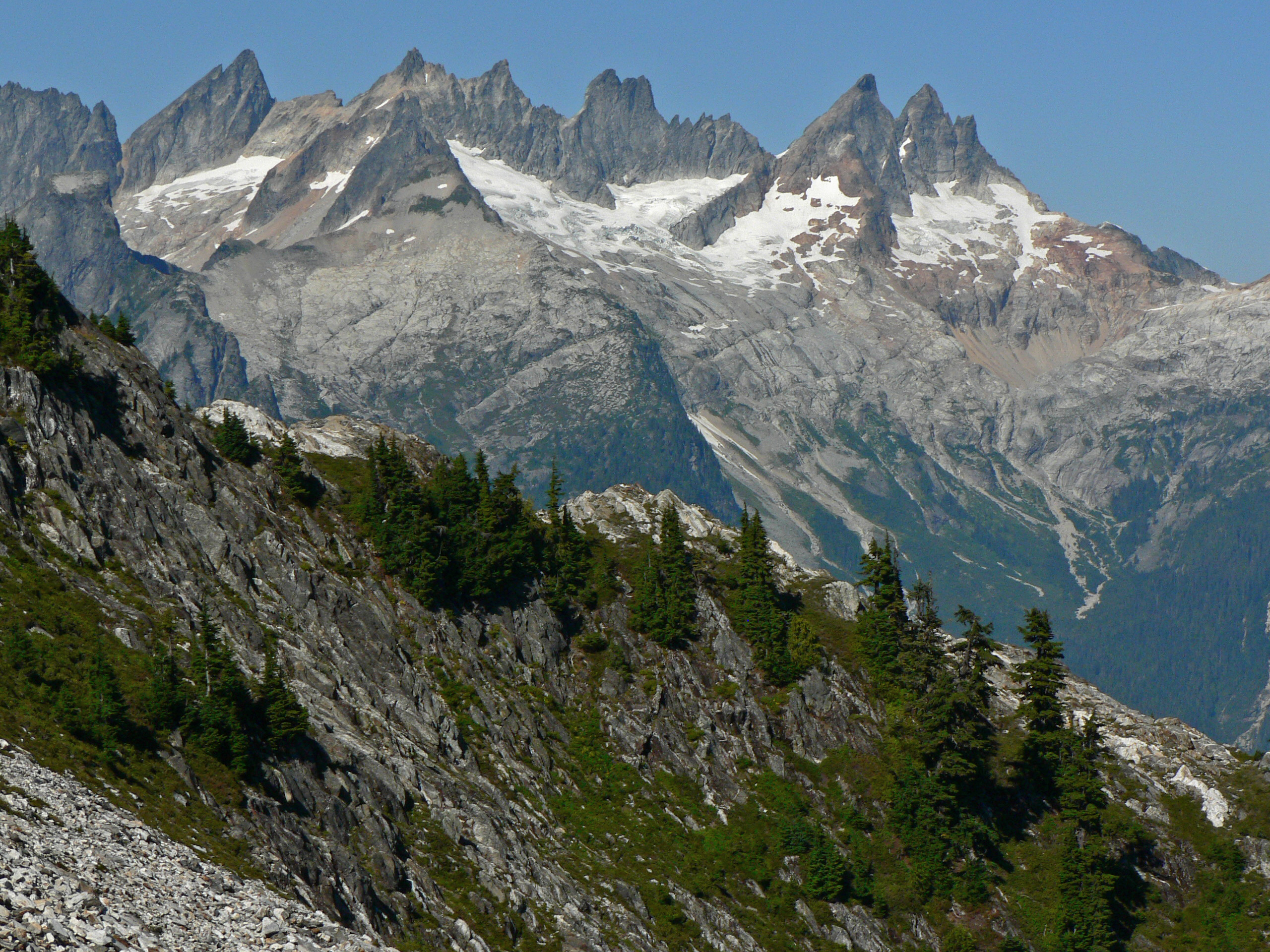
In background left to right, Mouth Terror, Mount Degenhardt, The Pyramid, Inspiration Peak and the McMillan Spires

== Climate ==
McMillan Spire is located in the marine west coast climate zone of western North America. Most weather fronts originate in the Pacific Ocean, and travel northeast toward the Cascade Mountains. As fronts approach the North Cascades, they are forced upward by the peaks of the Cascade Range, causing them to drop their moisture in the form of rain or snowfall onto the Cascades (Orographic lift). As a result, the west side of the North Cascades experiences high precipitation, especially during the winter months in the form of snowfall. During winter months, weather is usually cloudy, but, due to high pressure systems over the Pacific Ocean that intensify during summer months, there is often little or no cloud cover during the summer. Because of maritime influence, snow tends to be wet and heavy, resulting in high avalanche danger.

== Geology ==
The North Cascades features some of the most rugged topography in the Cascade Range with craggy peaks and ridges and deep glacial valleys. Geological events occurring many years ago created the diverse topography and drastic elevation changes over the Cascade Range leading to the various climate differences. These climate differences lead to vegetation variety defining the ecoregions in this area.

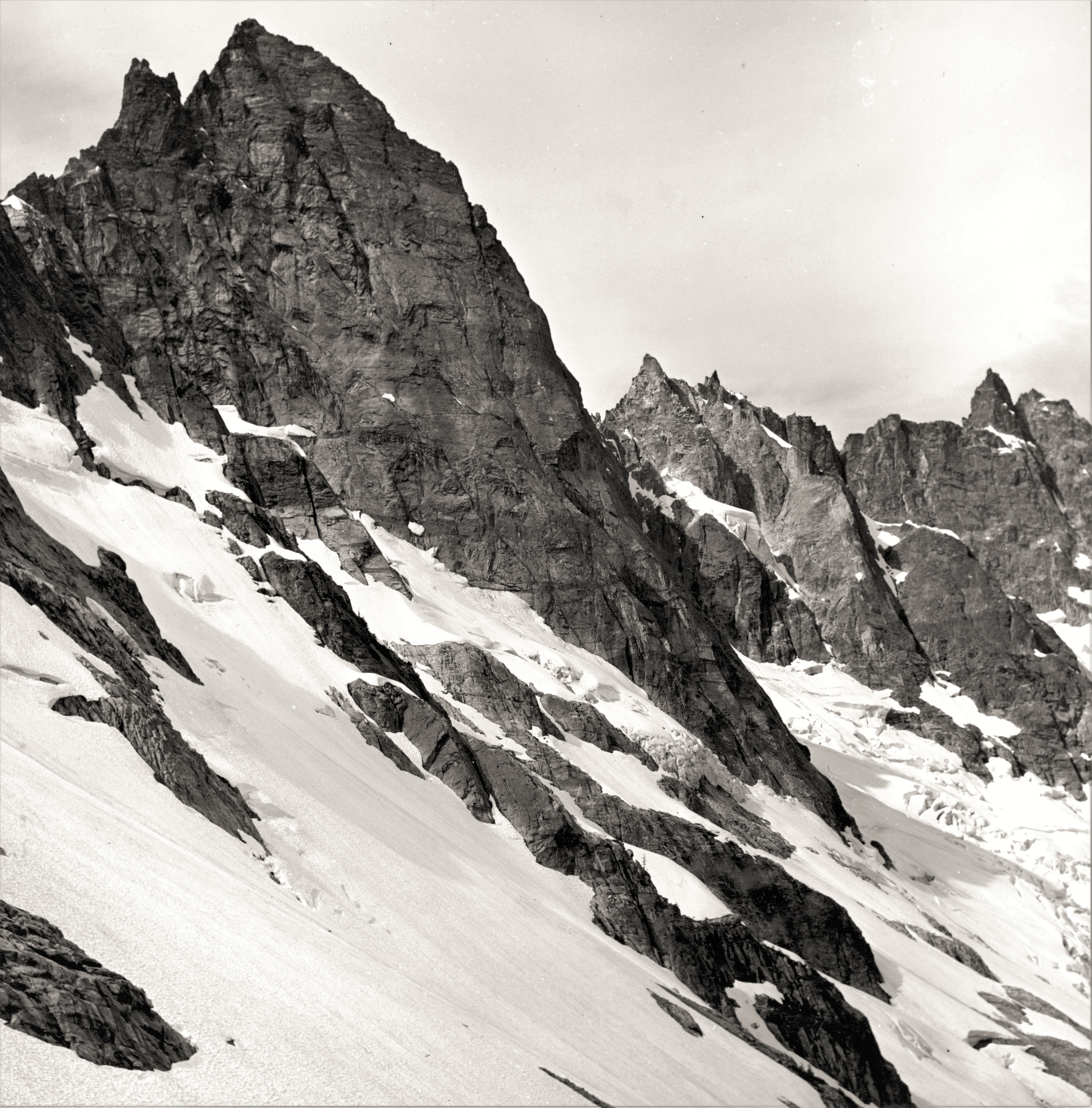
Uniform biotite gneiss exposed on the north side of McMillan Spire

The history of the formation of the Cascade Mountains dates back millions of years ago to the late Eocene Epoch. With the North American Plate overriding the Pacific Plate, episodes of volcanic igneous activity persisted. In addition, small fragments of the oceanic and continental lithosphere called terranes created the North Cascades about 50 million years ago.

During the Pleistocene period dating back over two million years ago, glaciation advancing and retreating repeatedly scoured the landscape leaving deposits of rock debris. The U-shaped cross section of the river valleys is a result of recent glaciation. Uplift and faulting in combination with glaciation have been the dominant processes which have created the tall peaks and deep valleys of the North Cascades area.
