= Sulphide (disambiguation) =

Sulphide (the British English spelling of "sulfide") is a chemical term associated with the following chemical classes:

- Sulfide
- Bisulfide
- Disulfide
- Thioether

It can also be associated with the name of a geographic location:

== Places ==
- Sulphide Creek Falls, a waterfall in North Cascades National Park
  - Sulphide Glacier, a glacier feeding the falls
  - Sulphide Creek, the creek feeding the falls
  - Sulphide Lake, a small lake upstream of the falls
- Sulphide, Ontario
- Sulphide Creek (Hastings County)
