= Damnation Peak =

Mountain in Washington, United States

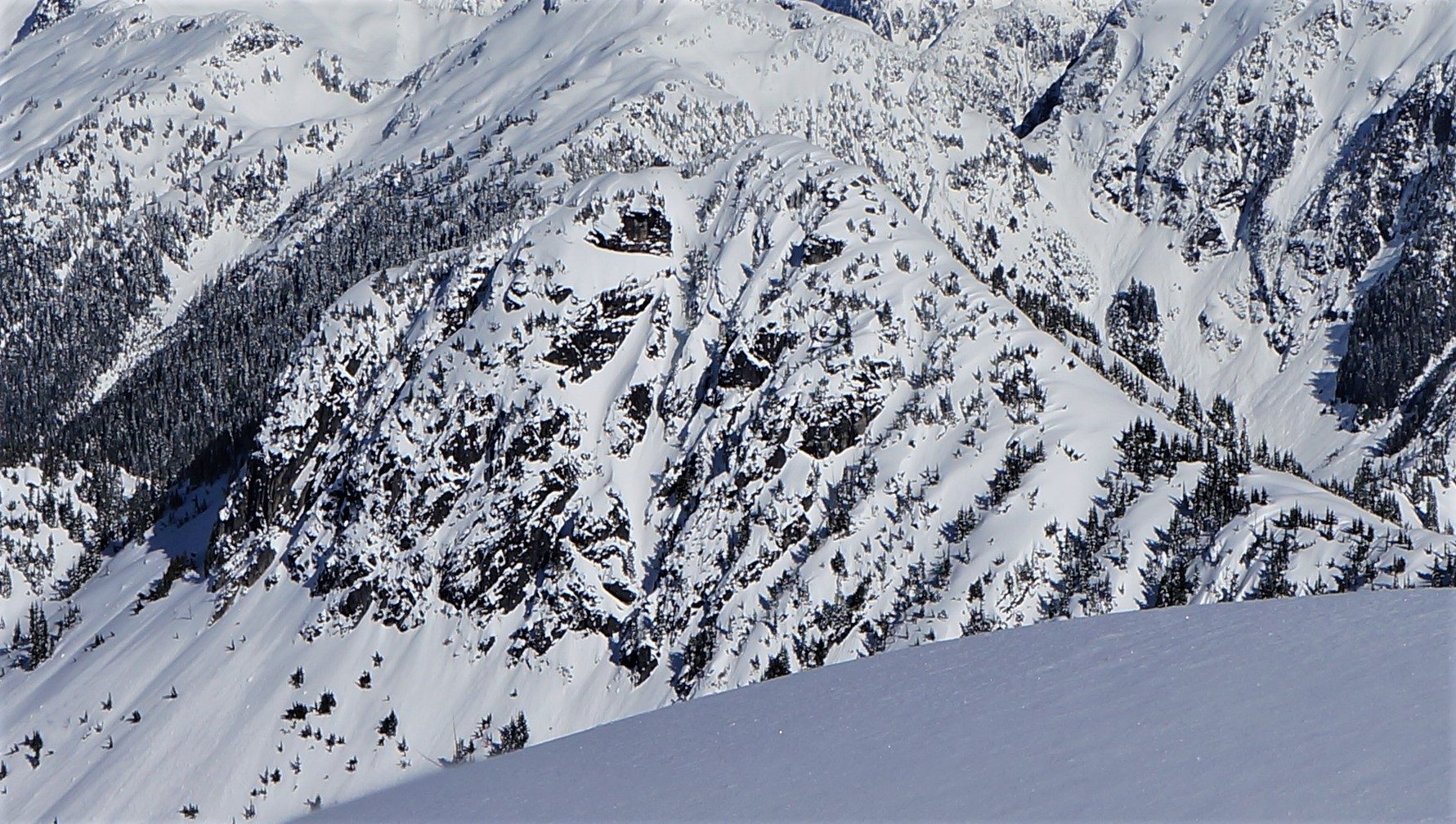
- South aspect, seen from Oakes Peak

Highest point
- Elevation: 5,635 ft (1,718 m)
- Prominence: 875 ft (267 m)
- Parent peak: Oakes Peak (5,681 ft)
- Isolation: 1.28 mi (2.06 km)
- Coordinates: 48°40′15″N 121°23′07″W

Geography
- Location within Washington (state) Location within the United States
- Interactive map of Damnation Peak
- Location: North Cascades National Park; Whatcom County, Washington, U.S.
- Parent range: North Cascades; Cascade Range
- Topo map: USGS Damnation Peak

Geology
- Rock type: Chilliwack batholith

Climbing
- Easiest route: scrambling South ridge

Damnation Peak is a 5,635-foot-elevation (1,718 m) mountain summit located in the North Cascades of Washington state. It is situated within North Cascades National Park, Stephen Mather Wilderness, and Whatcom County. Like many North Cascades peaks, Damnation Peak is more notable for its large, steep rise above local terrain than for its absolute elevation. Topographic relief is significant as the south aspect rises 2,800 feet (850 meters) above Damnation Creek in approximately 1.5 mile, and the north aspect rises 3,000 feet (910 meters) above Triumph Creek in one mile. Precipitation runoff from the mountain drains into these tributaries of the Skagit River. Neighbors include Mount Triumph, 2.8 miles (4.5 km) to the north-northeast, and Trappers Peak is 2.8 miles (4.5 km) to the east-northeast. The town of Newhalem is six miles to the east. In 1938, Lloyd Anderson climbed a nearby summit which is known today as Thornton Peak and called it "Damnation."

== Climate ==
Damnation Peak is located in the marine west coast climate zone of western North America. Weather fronts originating in the Pacific Ocean travel east toward the Cascade Mountains. As fronts approach the North Cascades, they are forced upward (orographic lift) by the peaks of the Cascade Range, causing them to drop their moisture in the form of rain or snowfall onto the Cascades. As a result, the west side of the North Cascades experiences high precipitation, especially during the winter months in the form of snowfall. Because of maritime influence, snow tends to be wet and heavy, resulting in avalanche danger. During winter months, the weather is usually cloudy, but, due to high pressure systems over the Pacific Ocean that intensify during summer months, there is often little or no cloud cover during the summer.

== Geology ==
The North Cascades features some of the most rugged topography in the Cascade Range with craggy peaks, ridges, and deep glacial valleys. Geological events occurring many years ago created the diverse topography and drastic elevation changes over the Cascade Range leading to the various climate differences. These climate differences lead to vegetation variety defining the ecoregions in this area.

The history of the formation of the Cascade Mountains dates back millions of years ago to the late Eocene Epoch. With the North American Plate overriding the Pacific Plate, episodes of volcanic igneous activity persisted. In addition, small fragments of the oceanic and continental lithosphere called terranes created the North Cascades about 50 million years ago.

During the Pleistocene period dating back over two million years ago, glaciation advancing and retreating repeatedly scoured the landscape leaving deposits of rock debris. The U-shaped cross section of the river valleys is a result of recent glaciation. Uplift and faulting in combination with glaciation have been the dominant processes which have created the tall peaks and deep valleys of the North Cascades area.

== See also ==
Geography of the North Cascades
