= Sulphide Creek =

River in the United States of America

- Location of the mouth of Sulphide Creek in Washington Sulphide Creek (the United States)
- Etymology: Sulphide is the British English spelling for sulphur.

Location
- Country: United States
- State: Washington
- County: Skagit, Whatcom

Physical characteristics
- Source: Sulphide Lake
  - coordinates: 48°48′13″N 121°34′52″W
  - elevation: 3,801 ft (1,159 m)
- Mouth: Skagit River
  - coordinates: 48°46′36″N 121°31′59″W
  - elevation: 869 ft (265 m)
- Length: 2.5 mi (4.0 km)
- Discharge
  - location: Baker River

Sulphide Creek is a 2.5-mile (4.0 km) glacial tributary of the Baker River in Whatcom County in the U.S. state of Washington, draining a steep and narrow canyon on the southeast flank of Mount Shuksan, inside North Cascades National Park. Although called a creek, it is river-like due to its high volume. The creek is fed by the "massive" Sulphide and Crystal glaciers above Sulphide Lake and it runs east collecting several small tributaries before flowing into the Baker River at elevation 869 feet (265 m). There are several very tall waterfalls occurring on the creek and its tributaries, the largest of which is Sulphide Creek Falls.

== Name ==
"Sulphide" is the British English spelling of sulfur. The creek was named for minerals that occur naturally in the area. During the 1950s molybdenite (molybdenum disulfide) was prospected near the headwaters of the North Fork of Sulphide Creek, although the deposit was described as having "no economic value".

== Course ==
Meltwater from the Sulphide and Crystal glaciers skips several hundred feet down a series of Shuksan greenschist cliffs into Sulphide Lake, a small and nearly inaccessible tarn at 3,800 feet (1,200 m) on the southeast flank of Mount Shuksan. Sulphide Creek flows out of the lake and drops down a narrow, deeply incised rock chute forming Sulphide Creek Falls, one of the tallest waterfalls in North America with an estimated height of 2,182 feet (665 m). According to Canyoneering Northwest, the Sulphide Creek canyon has had "no record of descent or exploration".

At the base of Sulphide Creek Falls, an unnamed tributary (which forms a high waterfall of its own) joins from the west. The creek then turns to the east and is joined from the north by another unnamed tributary whose basin forms four notable waterfalls – Seahpo Peak Falls (2,200 ft or 670 m), Cloudcap Falls (2,400 ft or 730 m), Jagged Ridge Falls (1,500 ft or 460 m) and Rockflow Canyon Falls (200 ft or 61 m).

The creek then continues generally southeast for about 2 miles (3.2 km) through thick avalanche brush and forest until it joins the Baker River, upstream of Blum Creek and the Baker Lake reservoir.

== See also ==
- Blum Basin Falls
- List of rivers of Washington (state)
- Swift Creek
