= Upper Curtis Glacier =

Glacier in the state of Washington

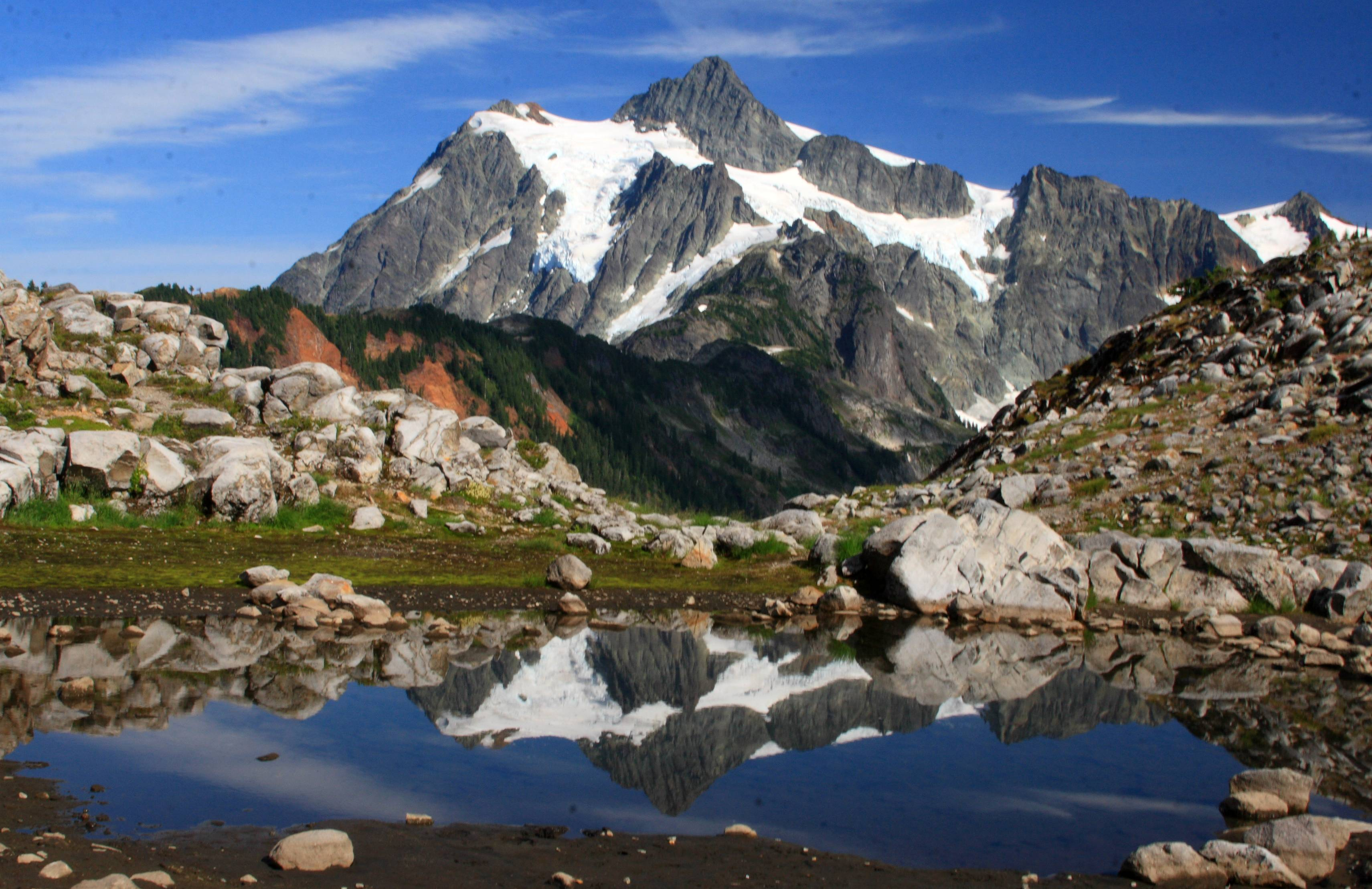
- Upper Curtis Glacier is on upper slopes of Mount Shuksan at right

- Location within Washington (state)
- Type: Mountain glacier
- Location: Whatcom County, Washington, U.S.
- Coordinates: 48°49′46″N 121°36′39″W
- Length: .40 mi (0.64 km)
- Terminus: Barren rock/icefall
- Status: Retreating

Upper Curtis Glacier is in North Cascades National Park in the U.S. state of Washington, on the west slopes of Mount Shuksan. Upper Curtis Glacier is not connected to Lower Curtis Glacier downslope to the southwest, but is to Hanging Glacier to the north and to Sulphide Glacier to the east.

== See also ==
- List of glaciers in the United States
