= Blum Lakes =

- Location within Washington (state) Location within the United States
- Location: North Cascades National Park, Whatcom County, Washington, United States
- Coordinates: 48°45′00″N 121°29′44″W
- Type: Cirque Lakes
- Primary outflows: Blum Creek
- Basin countries: United States
- Max. length: 400 yd (370 m)
- Max. width: 400 yd (370 m)
- Surface elevation: 5,003 ft (1,525 m)

Blum Lakes are located in North Cascades National Park, in the U. S. state of Washington. Consisting of approximately six cirque lakes immediately southwest of Mount Blum, the Blum Lakes are not near any maintained trails. Outflow from the lakes feeds into a tributary of Blum Creek. Nearby the Blum Basin Falls plunges 1,680 ft (510 m) along another tributary of Blum Creek.
