= Hidden Creek Glacier =

Glacier in the state of Washington

- Location within Washington (state)
- Type: Mountain glacier
- Location: Whatcom County, Washington, U.S.
- Coordinates: 48°43′17″N 121°30′06″W
- Length: .75 mi (1.21 km)
- Terminus: Icefall
- Status: Retreating

Hidden Creek Glacier is in North Cascades National Park in the U.S. state of Washington and is on the northwest slope of Hagan Mountain. Retreat of this glacier from 1979 to 2005 exposed several rock outcroppings in the middle of the glacier. The terminus of Hidden Creek Glacier only retreated 50 m (160 ft) between 1979 and 2011, however the increase in area of exposed rock outcroppings in the middle of the glacier indicates rapid thinning.

== See also ==
- List of glaciers in the United States
