= Hanging Glacier (Mount Shuksan) =

Glacier in the United States

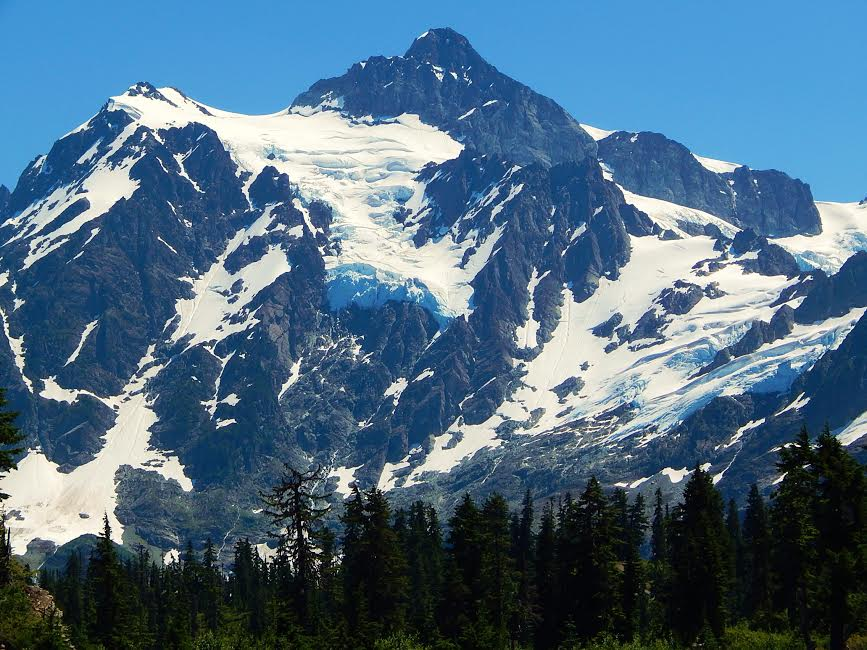
- Hanging Glacier is on upper slopes of Mount Shuksan at upper left

- Location within Washington (state)
- Type: Mountain glacier
- Location: Whatcom County, Washington, U.S.
- Coordinates: 48°50′07″N 121°36′07″W
- Length: .90 mi (1.45 km)
- Terminus: Barren rock/icefall
- Status: Retreating

Hanging Glacier is in North Cascades National Park in the U.S. state of Washington, on the north slopes of Mount Shuksan. Hanging Glacier is connected to Crystal Glacier at its uppermost margin, and also flows into Upper Curtis Glacier. Hanging Glacier is along the route taken in the first technical ascent of Mount Shuksan in 1939.

== See also ==
- List of glaciers in the United States
