= Blum Creek =

Coordinates: 48°45′10″N 121°32′55″W

Blum Creek is a small glacial tributary of the Baker River in Washington state, in the United States. It is sourced from the Hagan Glacier and another unnamed glacier on the north face of Mount Blum, and flows approximately 1.5 miles (2.4 km) from there to its mouth at the Baker River. Hagan Glacier is located below Mount Blum and the creek is also fed by runoff from the Blum Lakes, a set of six lakes south of Bacon Peak. The creek joins the Baker River two drainages downstream of Sulphide Creek, another Baker River glacial tributary. Blum Creek forms the waterfall Blum Basin Falls as it tumbles down a 1,680-foot (510 m) glacial cliff. The creek's watershed is an overwintering location for the local Rocky mountain goats (Oreamnos americanus).

== See also ==
- List of rivers of Washington (state)
