= Crystal Glacier =

Glacier in the state of Washington

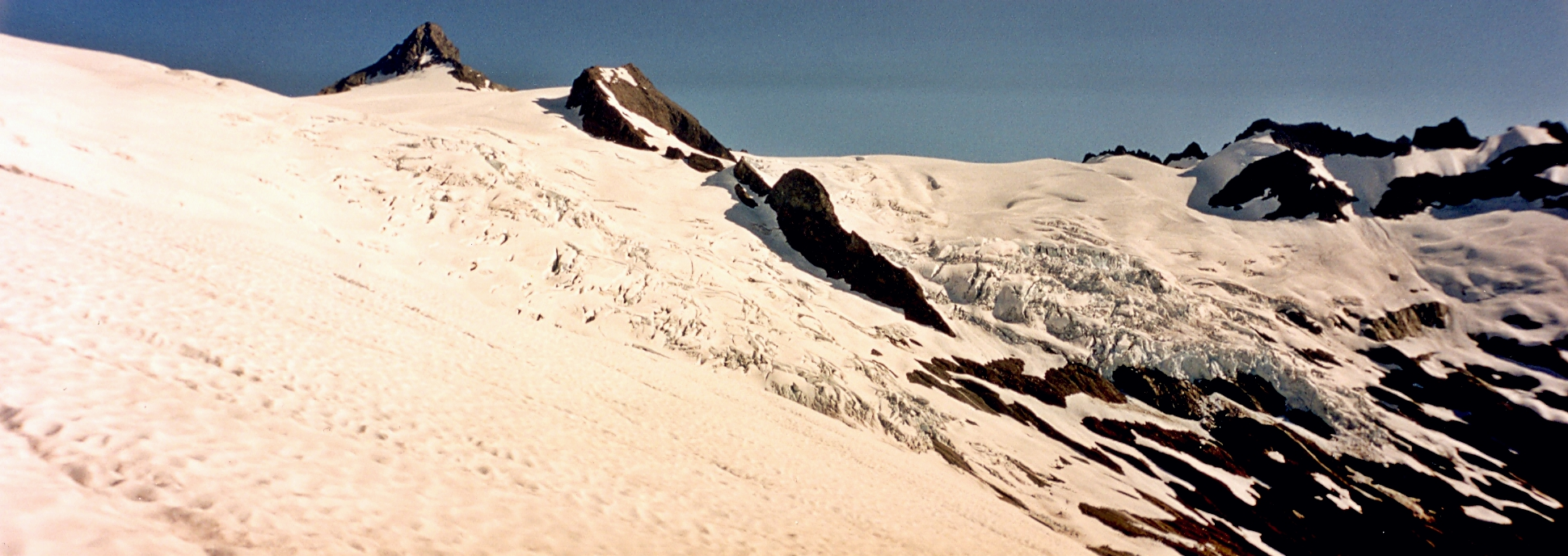
- Sulphide Glacier (left) and Crystal Glacier (right)

- Location within Washington (state)
- Type: Mountain glacier
- Location: Whatcom County, Washington, U.S.
- Coordinates: 48°49′36″N 121°35′31″W
- Length: 1.25 mi (2.01 km)
- Terminus: Barren rock/icefall
- Status: Retreating

Crystal Glacier is in North Cascades National Park in the U.S. state of Washington, on the south slopes of Mount Shuksan. Descending 1.25 mi (2.01 km) from just east of the summit of Mount Shuksan, near its origination point, Crystal Glacier is connected to the larger Sulphide Glacier to the west. Crystal Glacier descends from 8,200 to 5,800 ft (2,500 to 1,800 m), and is also connected to East Nooksack Glacier as well as Hanging Glacier near it uppermost margins. Both Crystal and Sulphide Glaciers have a series of 300-to-1,000-foot (91 to 305 m) high cascades which are collectively referred to as Sulphide Basin Falls. Below these cascades lies Sulphide Lake, which empties over Sulphide Creek Falls, one of the highest waterfalls in North America with a nearly 2,200 ft (670 m) drop.

== See also ==
- List of glaciers in the United States
