= Paternoster lake =

Glacial lakes connected by a stream system

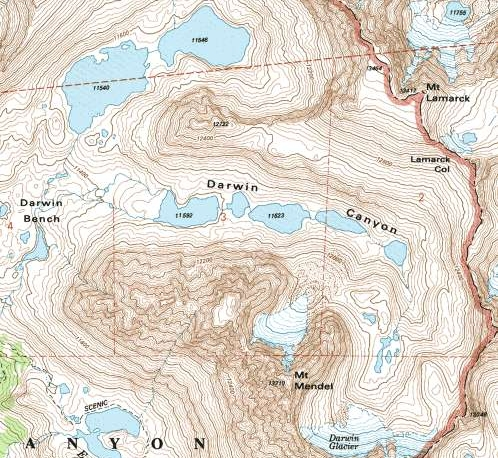
Paternoster lakes in Darwin Canyon, in California's John Muir Wilderness

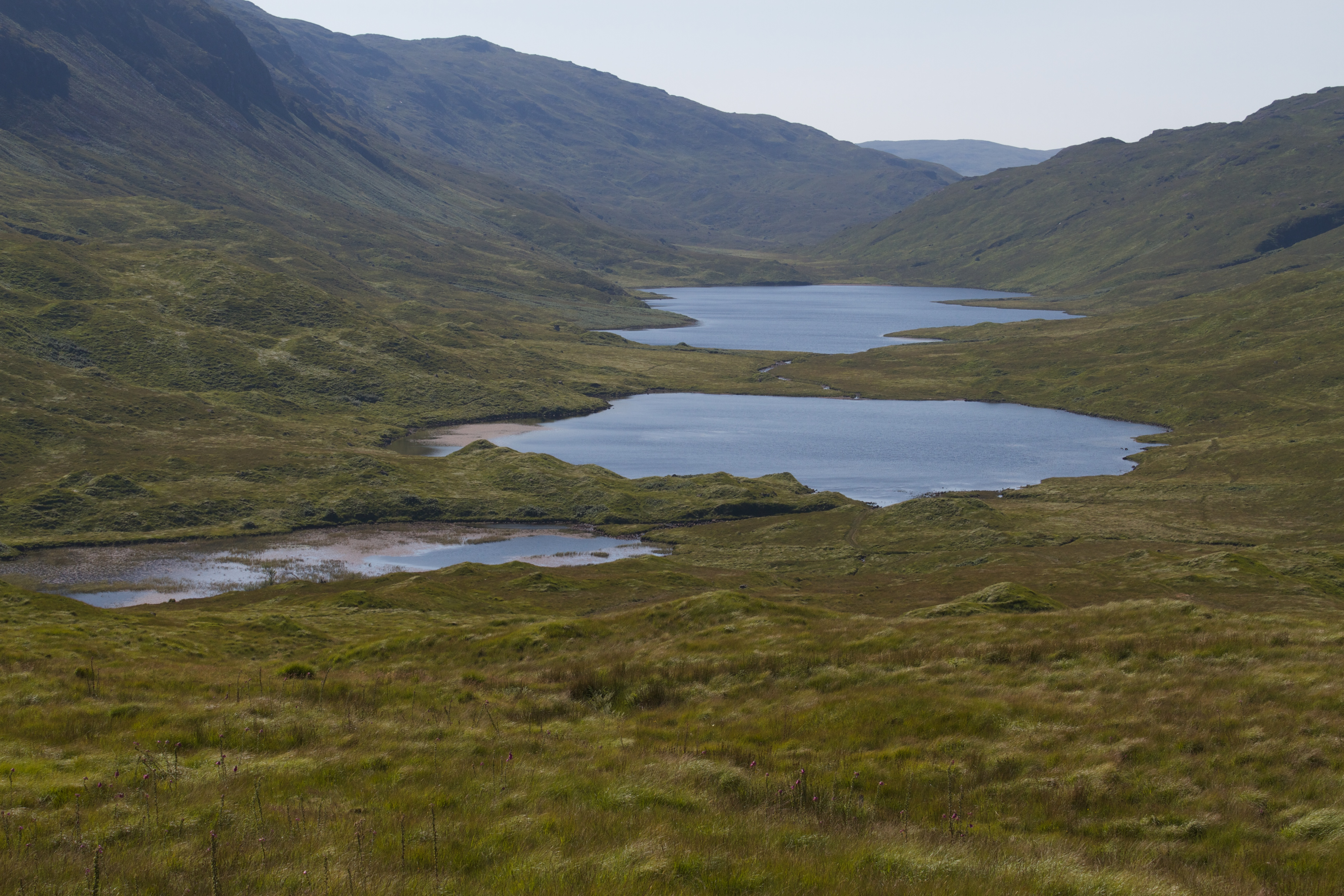
Three paternoster lakes connected by streams, on the island of Mull, Scotland

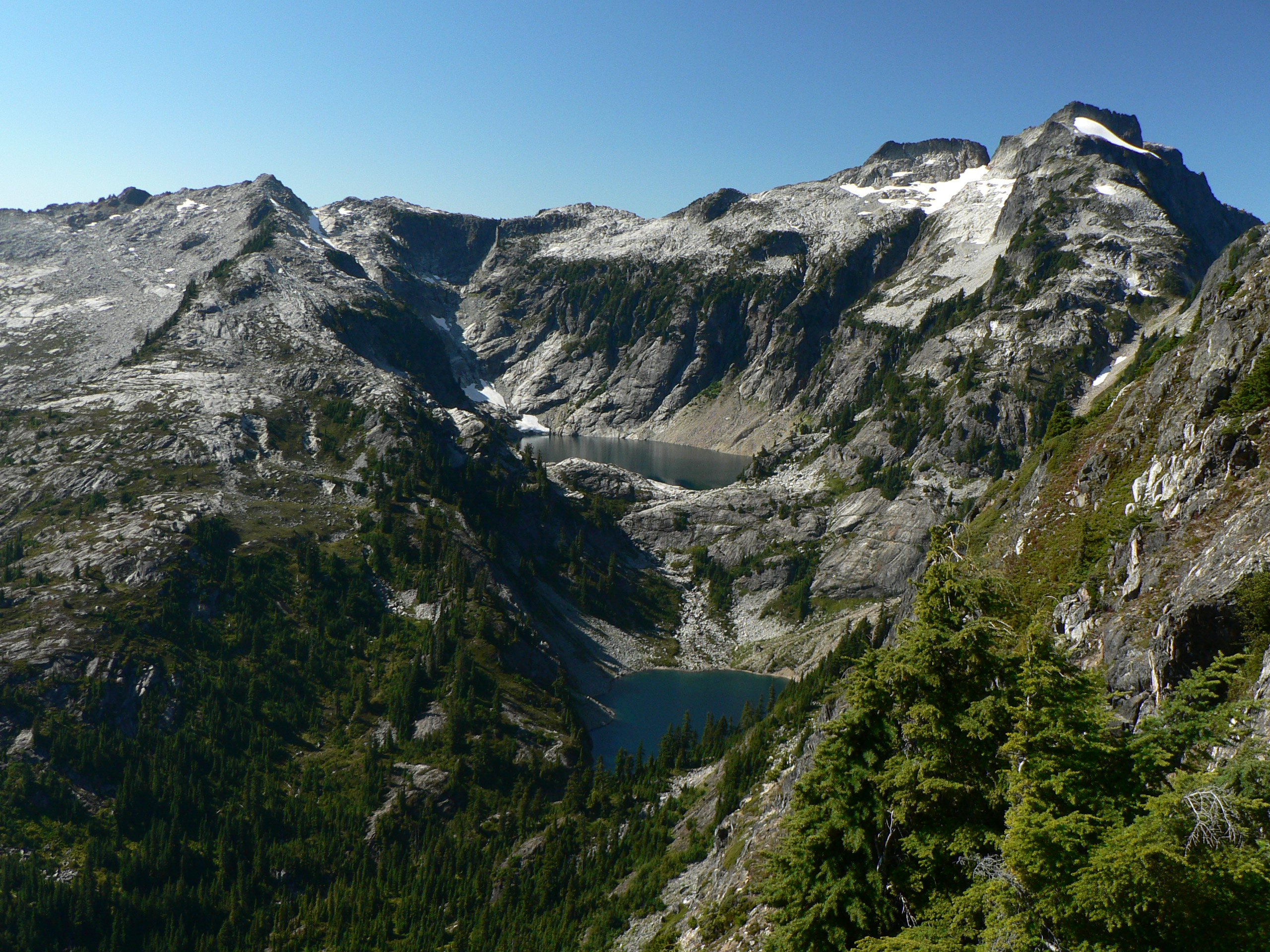
The three Thornton Lakes (two visible in image) are paternoster lakes located within North Cascades National Park

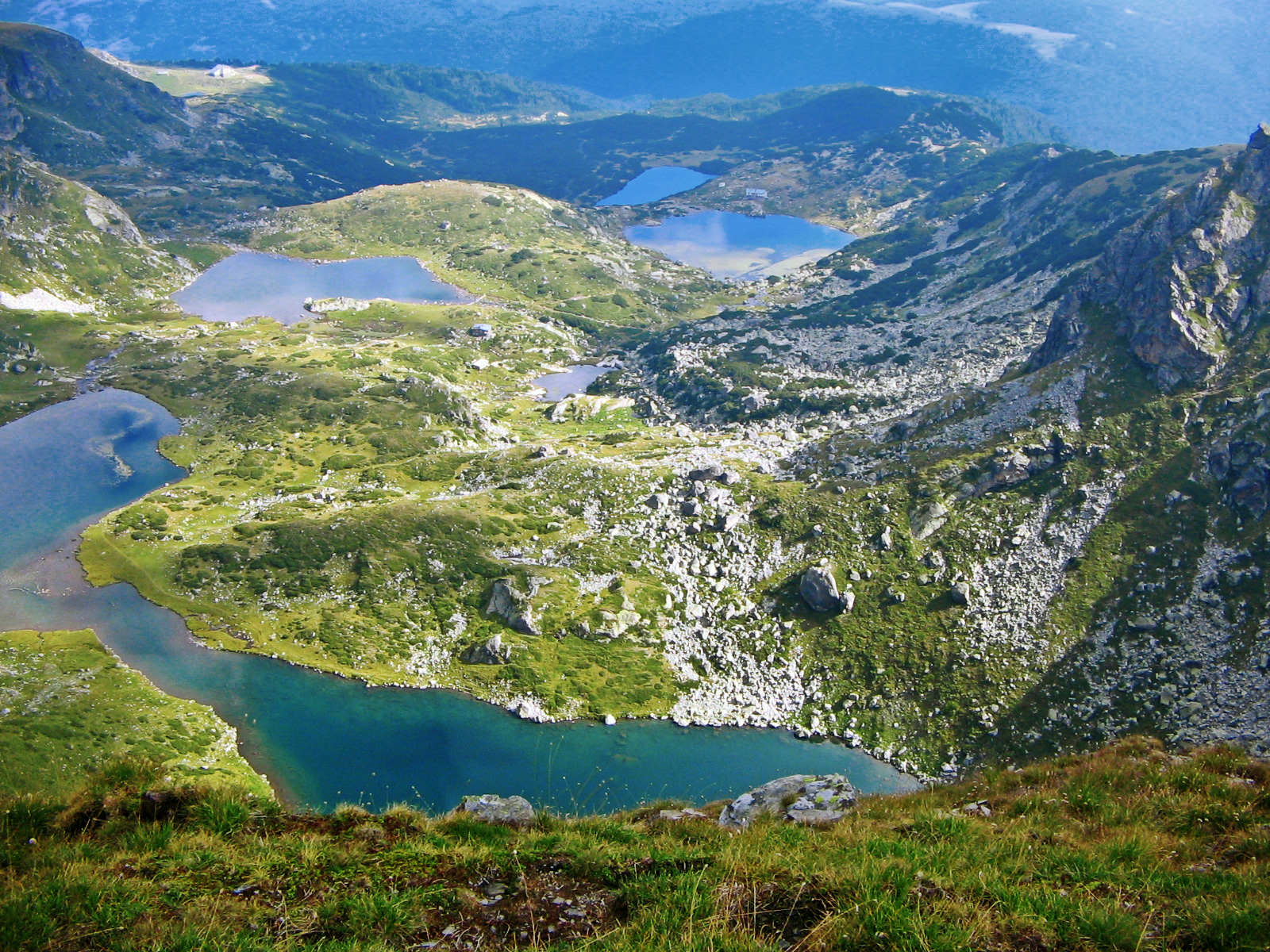
The Seven Rila Lakes, Rila Mountain, Bulgaria

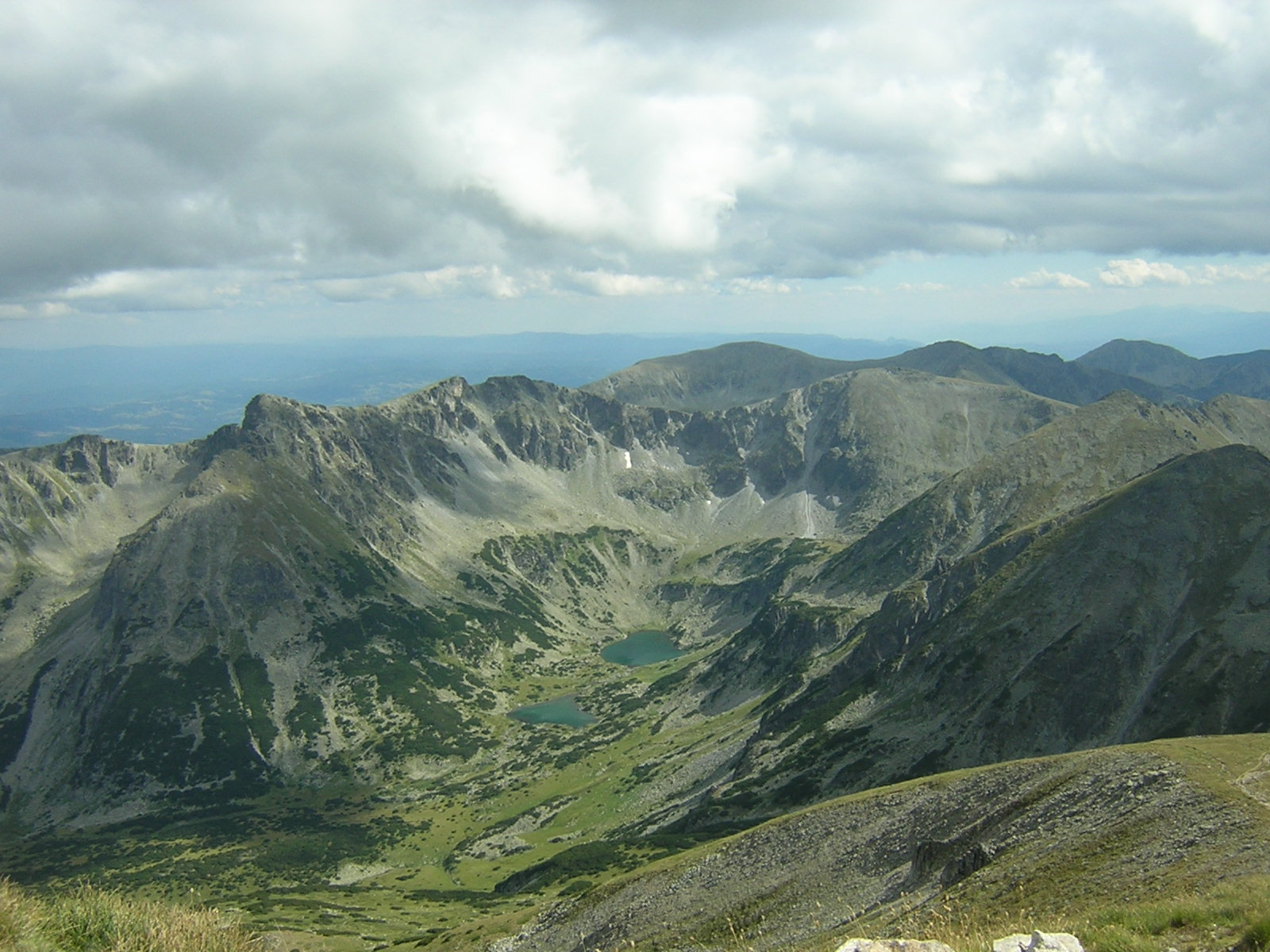
The origin of the Maritsa river seen from Musala, Rila Mountain, Bulgaria

A paternoster lake is one of a series of glacial lakes connected by a single stream or a braided stream system. The name comes from the word Paternoster, another name for the Lord's Prayer derived from the Latin words for the prayer's opening words, "Our Father"; Paternoster lakes are so called because of their resemblance to rosary beads, with alternating prayer beads connected by a string or fine chain.

Paternoster lakes occur in alpine valleys, climbing one after the other to the valley's head, called a corrie, which often contains a cirque lake. Paternoster lakes are created by recessional moraines, or rock dams, that are formed by the advance and subsequent upstream retreat and melting of the ice. The local variation in rock types can also be a factor in creating these lakes. A glacier encountering weaker rocks at its base, will be able to erode deeper than when it experiences harder, less erodible rocks. As the glacier melts, lakes form where weaker rock was excavated.

Examples of this occur in California's Sierra Nevada, where many stream courses above 3000 m in elevation contain paternoster lakes.

Glacier National park provides another example of paternoster lakes. Lake Sherburne, Swiftcurrent Lake, Lake Josephine, Grinnell Lake, and Upper Grinnell Lake are connected by a stream. The U shape of the valley indicates that it was formed by a glacier long ago, as opposed to a V-shaped valley cut by a river.

Paternoster lakes can be found in Waterton Lakes National Park, Canada. The three Carthew lakes are in a hanging cirque, reflecting their glacial origins, with Anderson Lake lower in elevation but still part of this paternoster lake procession.

In Yoho National Park, Canada, Lake OHara, Lake Oesa, and the large pools in the stream that connect the two give a total of five stair-stepped lakes/ponds. The presence of a rock glacier in the area is evidence for the glacial origins of this chain of lakes.
