= Mount Triumph =

Mountain in Washington state, United States

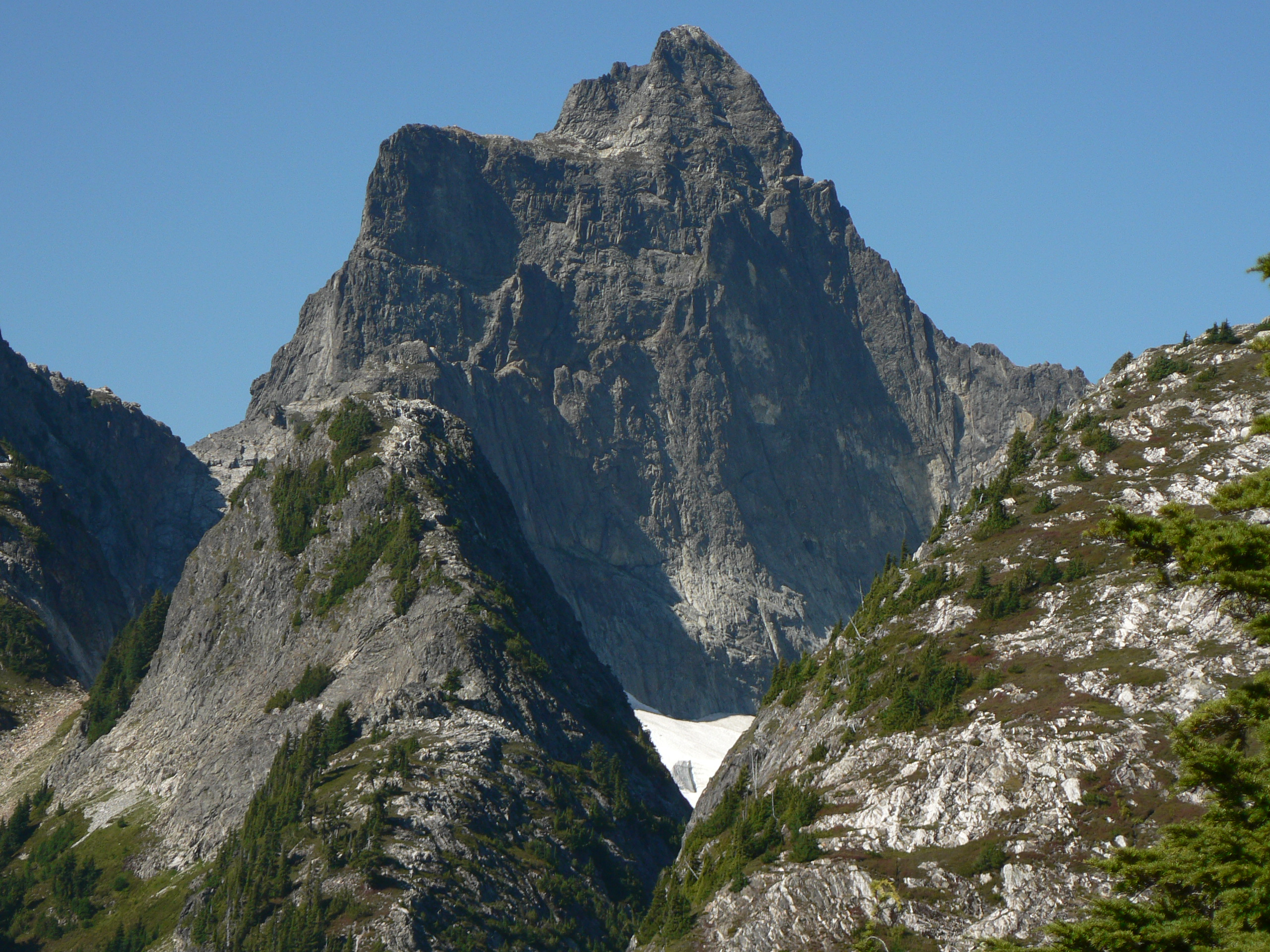
- The east face of Mount Triumph (center skyline)

Highest point
- Elevation: 7,240+ ft (2,210+ m) NGVD 29
- Prominence: 1,720 ft (524 m)
- Coordinates: 48°42′23″N 121°21′18″W

Geography
- Location within Washington (state)
- Location: North Cascades National Park, Whatcom County, Washington, U.S.
- Parent range: Cascade Range
- Topo map: USGS Mount Blum

Climbing
- First ascent: July 31, 1938 by Lloyd Anderson, Lyman Boyer, Dave Lind, Sig Hall, and Louis Smith
- Easiest route: Rock and ice climb

Mount Triumph is a summit in the North Cascades range of Washington state. Located approximately 5.5 miles (8.9 km) west-northwest of the town of Newhalem, it was named by Lage Wernstedt, a surveyor with the U.S. Forest Service. A significant peak in North Cascades National Park, Mount Triumph is one of its "outstanding sights" and is well known among regional climbers for its lack of easy climbing routes to the summit. Despite its moderate elevation, its local relief is dramatic. With the terrain deeply dissected by the valleys of Bacon Creek on the west and Goodell Creek on the east, it rises 1 mile (1.6 km) in less than 2 miles (3.2 km) on the latter side.

The mountain is extremely rugged and one author describes it as "a rock thumb with near-vertical to overhanging faces on three sides." From above, it has the appearance of a three-bladed propeller consisting of the northeast, northwest, and south ridges. Mount Despair (7,292 ft or 2,223 m) is located 2.3 miles (3.7 km) to the north-northwest. The two peaks are connected by Triumph Pass (5,520 ft or 1,680 m).

== Geology ==
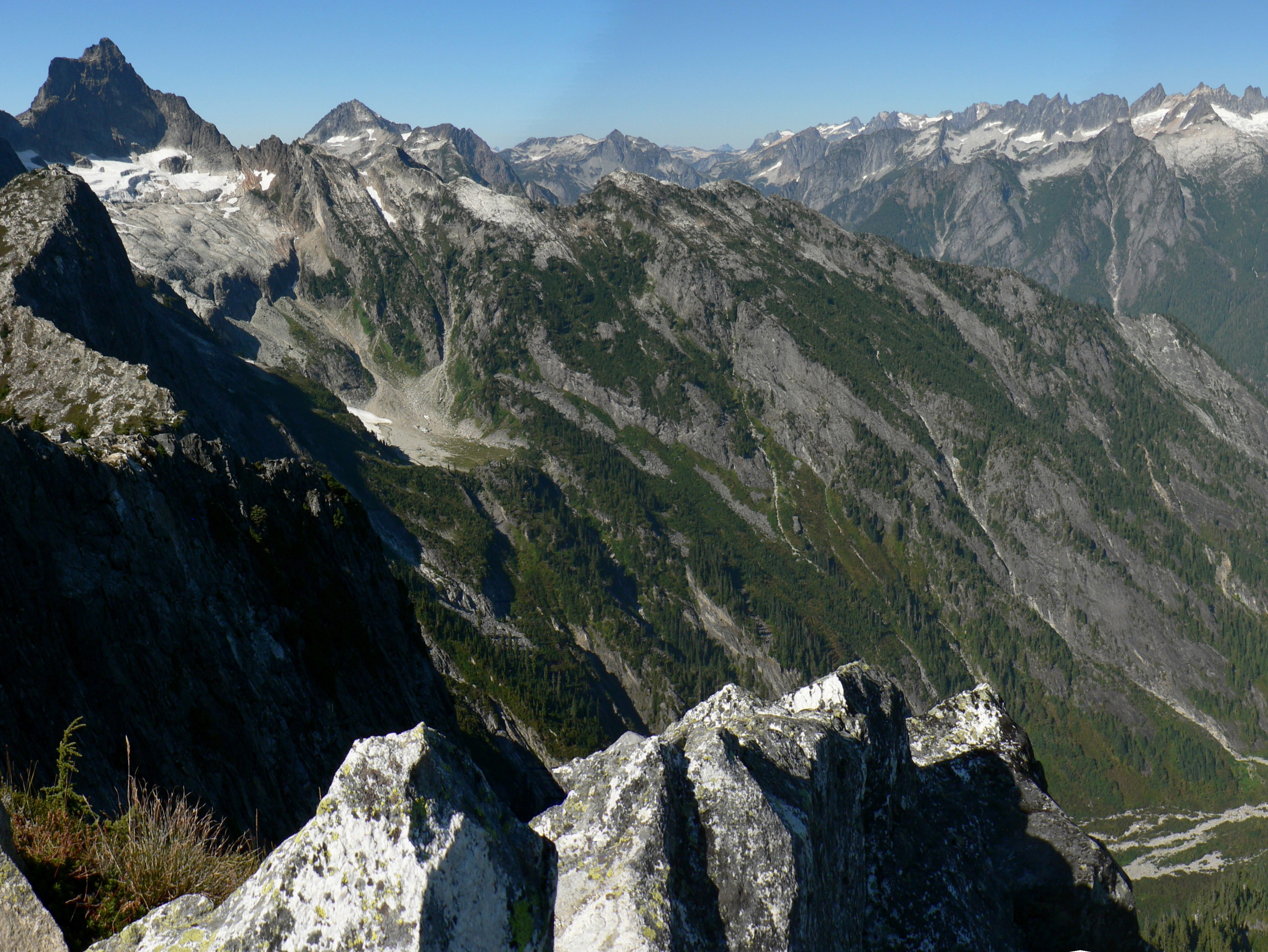
Mountains and valleys around Mount Triumph from Trappers Peak

The mountain lies completely within the drainage of the Skagit River, Bacon Creek and Goodell Creek being tributaries of the Skagit. Two small glaciers are found below the east face and north faces, both of which are receding. The south ridge of Mount Triumph ends at a minor peak that has been called Thornton Peak (6,935 ft or 2,114 m). On its south flank is a deep cirque that hold the Thornton Lakes, a chain of three lakes at 4,486 feet (1,367 m) to 5,040 feet (1,540 m), the source of south-flowing Thornton Creek, another tributary of the Skagit River.

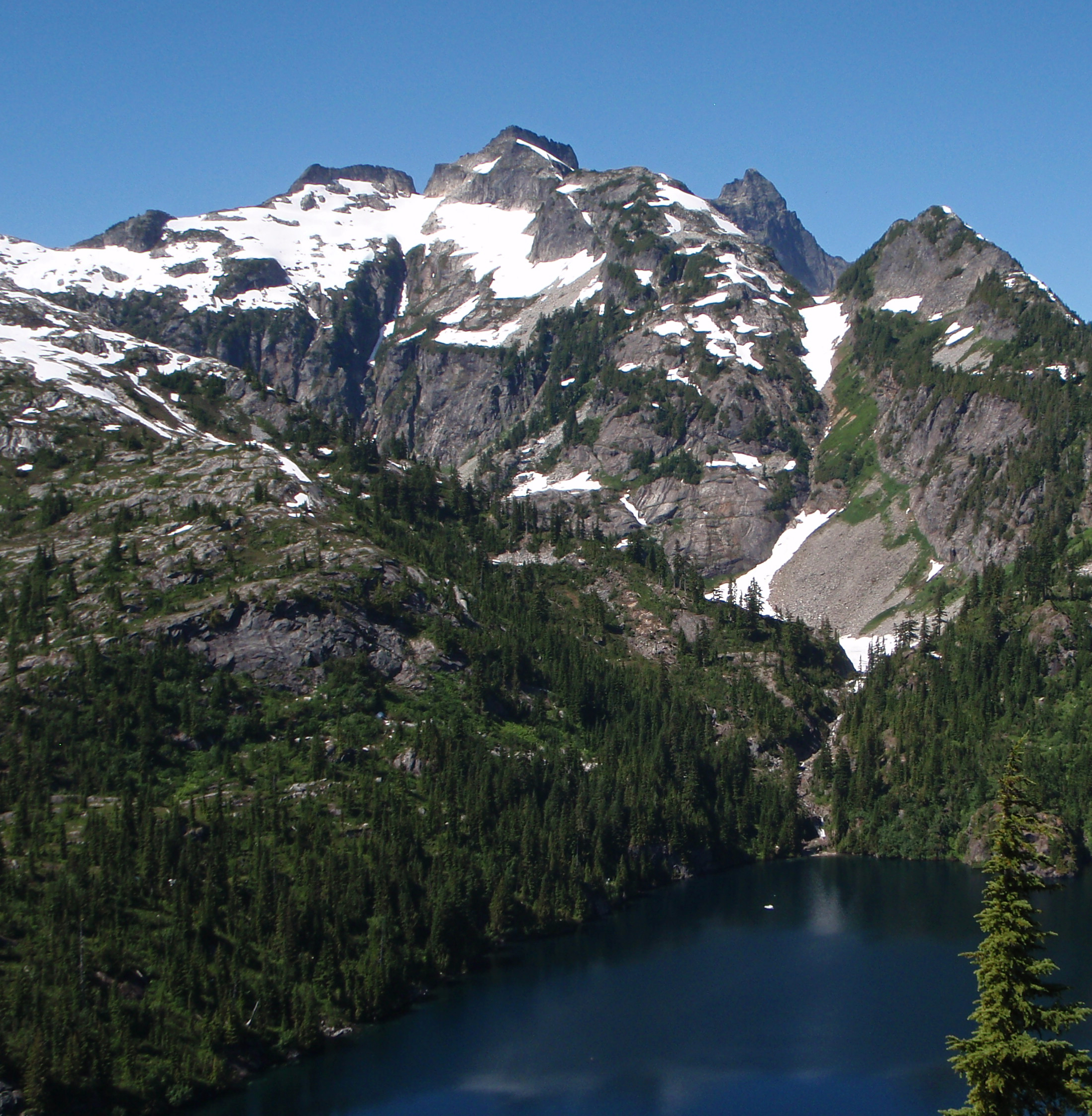
Thornton Peak and lower Thornton Lake

Mount Triumph is composed of old orthogneiss. Neighboring Mount Despair is an exposure of light grey granodiorite, part of the great pluton of the Chilliwack batholith, which is visible west of the Thornton Lakes. East of the lakes are dark amphibolite, orthogneiss and mica quartz schist.

== Climbing ==
The easiest route to the summit is on the west. It is rated class 4 and can be dangerous when wet. The approach is by means of the Triumph Pass climber's route. The northeast ridge is more difficult at class 5.5, but is a notable climb on generally good rock. It is approached by means of the Thornton Lakes Trail. A scrambling route from Thornton Lakes Trail leads to the summit of Trappers Peak (5,966 ft or 1,818 m) which provides good views of Mount Triumph.

== Climate ==
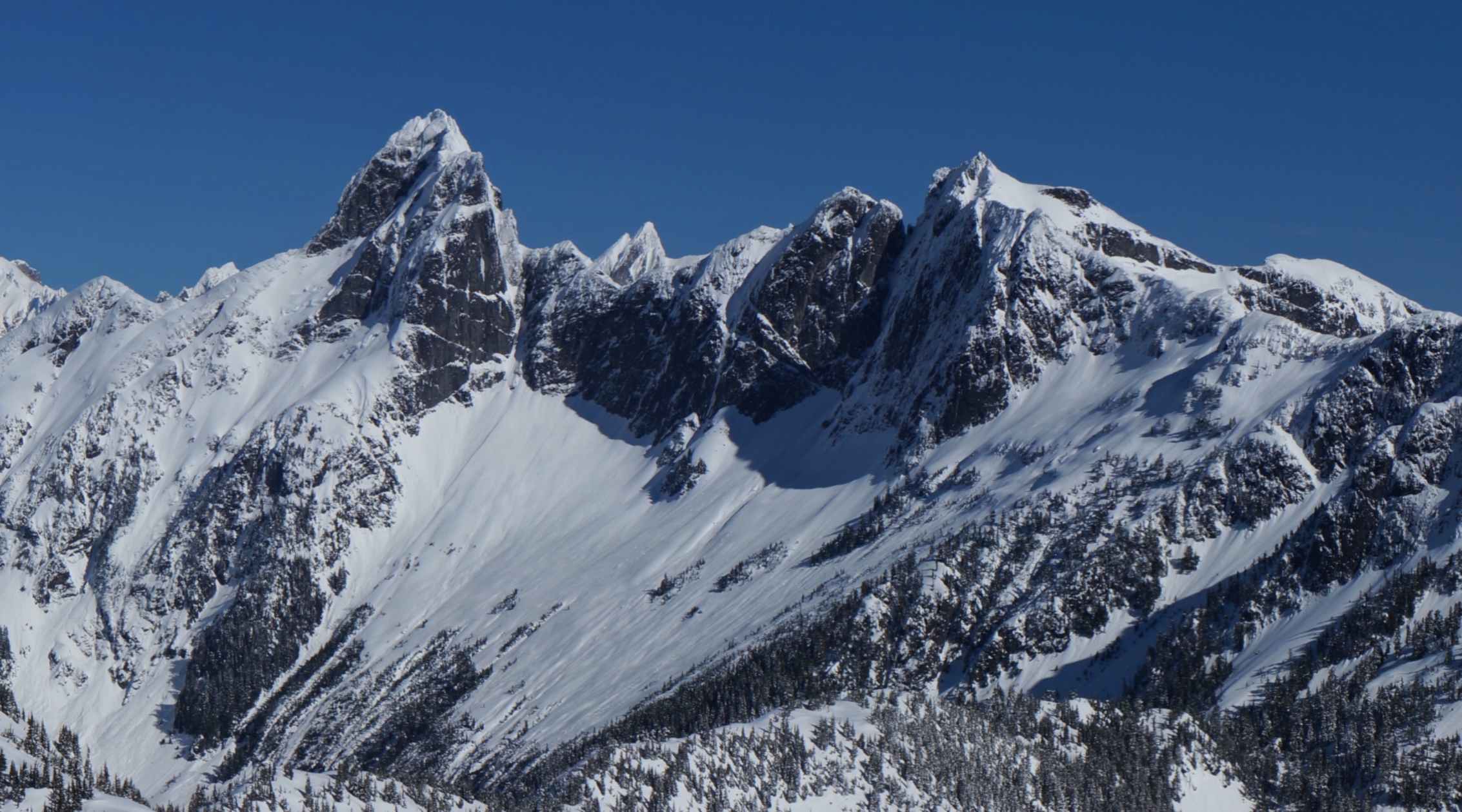
Mount Triumph (left) and Thornton Peak (right) seen from Oakes Peak

Mount Triumph is located in the marine west coast climate zone of western North America. Most weather fronts originate in the Pacific Ocean, and travel northeast toward the Cascade Mountains. As fronts approach the North Cascades, they are forced upward by the peaks of the Cascade Range, causing them to drop their moisture in the form of rain or snowfall onto the Cascades (Orographic lift). As a result, the west side of the North Cascades experiences high precipitation, especially during the winter months in the form of snowfall. During winter months, weather is usually cloudy, but, due to high pressure systems over the Pacific Ocean that intensify during summer months, there is often little or no cloud cover during the summer. Because of maritime influence, snow tends to be wet and heavy, resulting in high avalanche danger.

== Nearby mountains ==
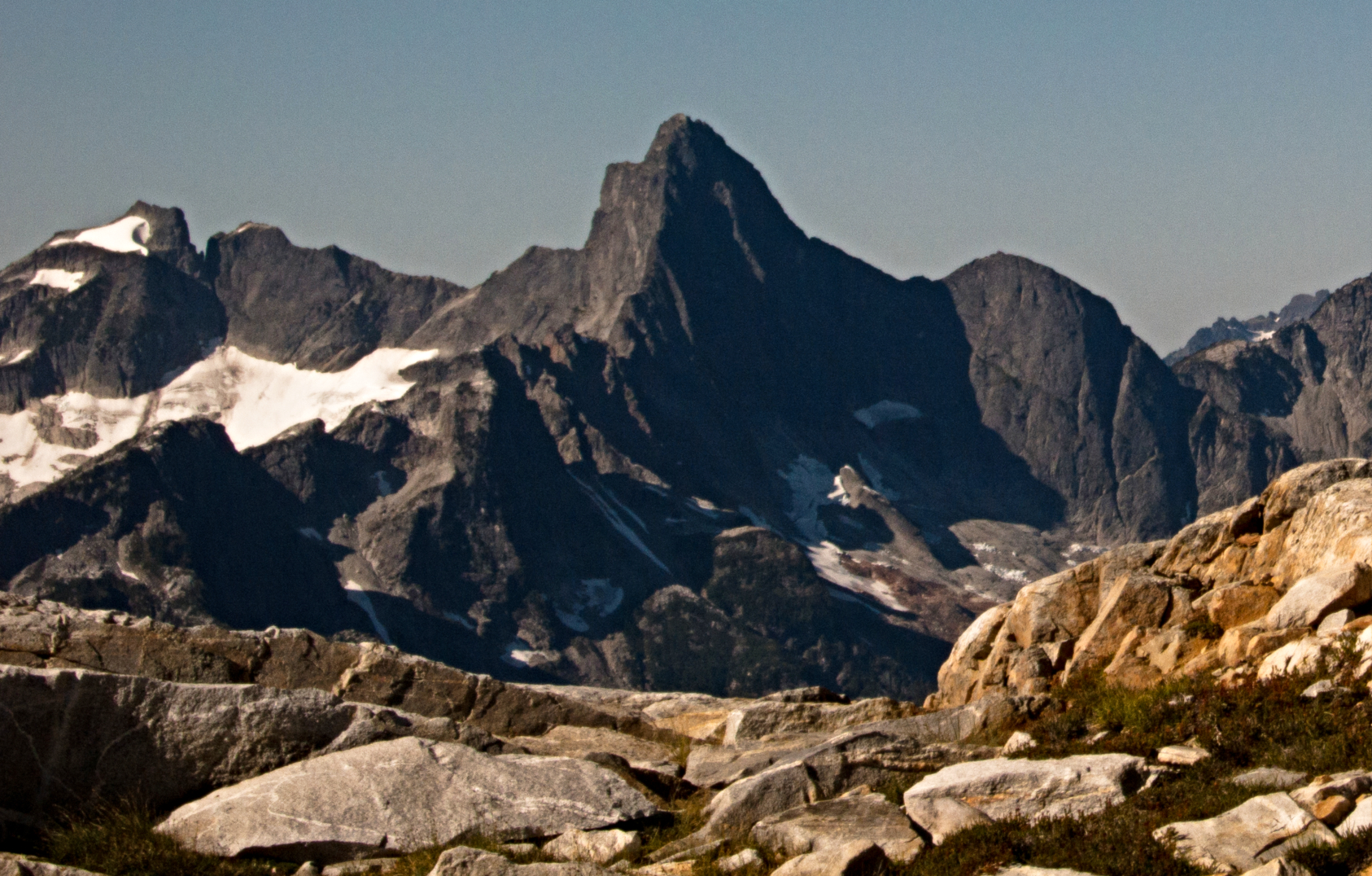
Mount Triumph from northeast

- Mount Blum
- Mount Despair
- Mount Shuksan
- Mount Terror
