= Mount Blum =

Mountain in Washington (state), United States

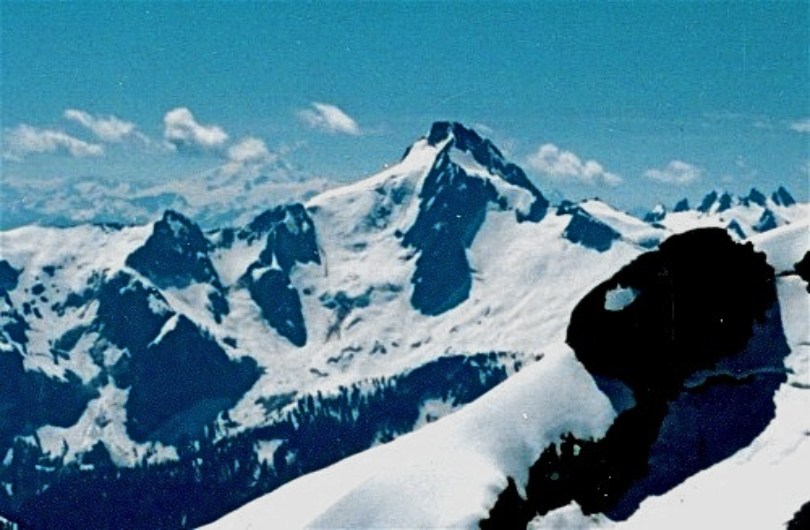
- Mount Blum seen from Ruth Mountain

Highest point
- Elevation: 7,685 ft (2,342 m) NAVD 88
- Prominence: 3,280 ft (1,000 m)
- Coordinates: 48°45′15″N 121°28′57″W

Geography
- Location within Washington (state)
- Location: Whatcom County, Washington U.S.
- Parent range: Cascade Range
- Topo map: USGS Mount Blum

Geology
- Rock age: 15,000 years
- Volcanic arc: Cascade Volcanic Arc

Climbing
- Easiest route: Rock/ice climb

Mount Blum, or Mount Bald, is a 7,685-foot (2,342 m) summit of the North Cascades range in Washington state, on the western edge of North Cascades National Park. It is the highest summit of a string of mountain peaks located east of Mount Shuksan and west of the Picket Range. Two small active glaciers rest on its northern flank. Mount Blum was named after John Blum, a United States Forest Service fire patrol pilot who perished in a plane crash near Snoqualmie Pass in 1931.

Six small glacial-fed tarns, called the Blum Lakes, occupy successive bowls on the southeast side of the mountain. Several other ice sheets are spread across cirques and basins on Mount Blum and neighboring peaks. Blum Creek, a stream named for the mountain, drains north and west off Mount Blum and flows into the Baker River, which in turn flows into the Skagit River. The Baker Lake reservoir, one of a series of reservoirs that impound the lower Baker River, touches Mount Blum at its far northeastern segment. Lonesome Creek and Scramble Creek also drain valleys east and north of Mount Blum, respectively. Steep cliffs and drop-offs in the valleys produce some extremely tall waterfalls, such as 1,680-foot (510 m) Blum Basin Falls.

Skiing is an occasional activity on the slopes of Mount Blum. Despite the popularity of the sport, Mount Blum is nearly surrounded by trail-less wilderness, except the southern ridge that connects to Mount Hagan.

Mount Blum is composed of extremely firm granite. This intrusion is common throughout the range, and is much stronger than the looser rock that makes up Mount Shuksan and the Picket Range.

== Nearby mountains ==
- Mount Triumph
- Mount Despair
- Mount Shuksan
- Mount Terror
- Mount Prophet

== Climate ==
Mount Blum is located in the marine west coast climate zone of western North America. Most weather fronts originate in the Pacific Ocean, and travel northeast toward the Cascade Mountains. As fronts approach the North Cascades, they are forced upward by the peaks of the Cascade Range, causing them to drop their moisture in the form of rain or snowfall onto the Cascades (Orographic lift). As a result, the west side of the North Cascades experiences high precipitation, especially during the winter months in the form of snowfall. During winter months, weather is usually cloudy, but, due to high pressure systems over the Pacific Ocean that intensify during summer months, there is often little or no cloud cover during the summer. Because of maritime influence, snow tends to be wet and heavy, resulting in high avalanche danger.

== Geology ==
The North Cascades features some of the most rugged topography in the Cascade Range with craggy peaks, spires, ridges, and deep glacial valleys. Geological events occurring many years ago created the diverse topography and drastic elevation changes over the Cascade Range leading to the various climate differences.

The history of the formation of the Cascade Mountains dates back millions of years ago to the late Eocene Epoch. With the North American Plate overriding the Pacific Plate, episodes of volcanic igneous activity persisted. In addition, small fragments of the oceanic and continental lithosphere called terranes created the North Cascades about 50 million years ago.

During the Pleistocene period dating back over two million years ago, glaciation advancing and retreating repeatedly scoured the landscape leaving deposits of rock debris. The U-shaped cross section of the river valleys is a result of recent glaciation. Uplift and faulting in combination with glaciation have been the dominant processes which have created the tall peaks and deep valleys of the North Cascades area.

== Gallery ==
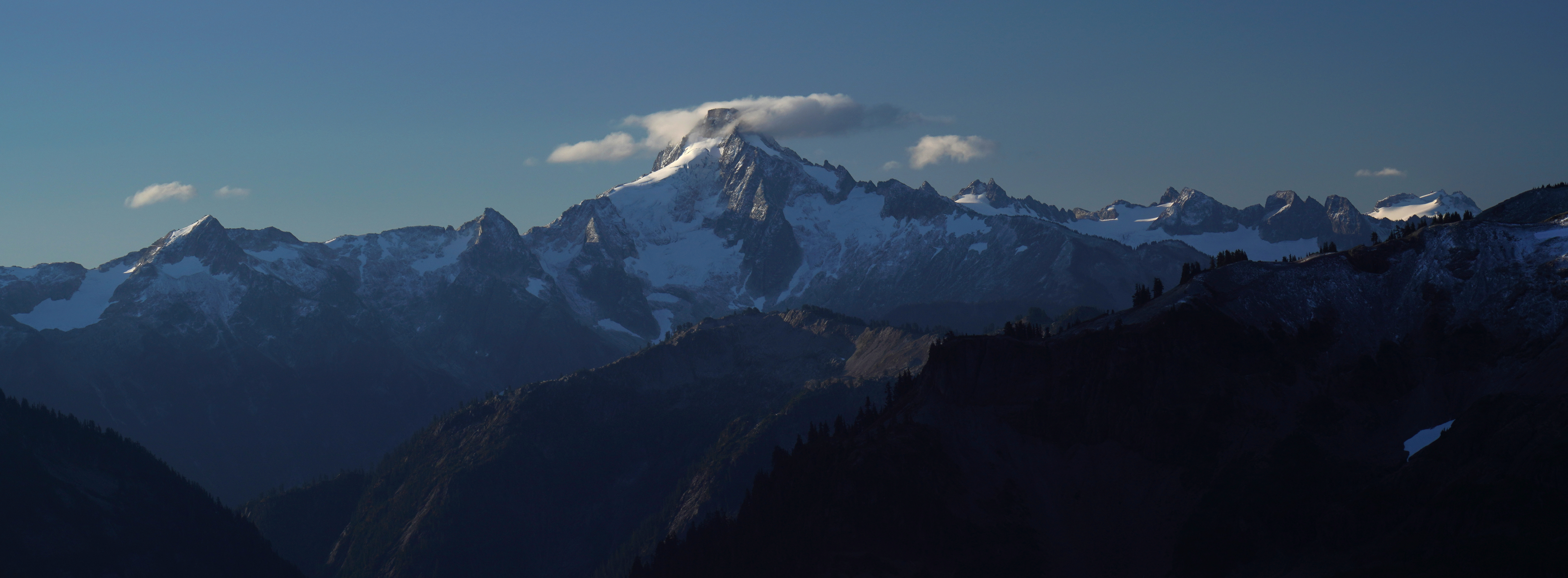
Mount Blum seen from Copper Ridge
