= Trappers Peak =

Mountain in Washington State

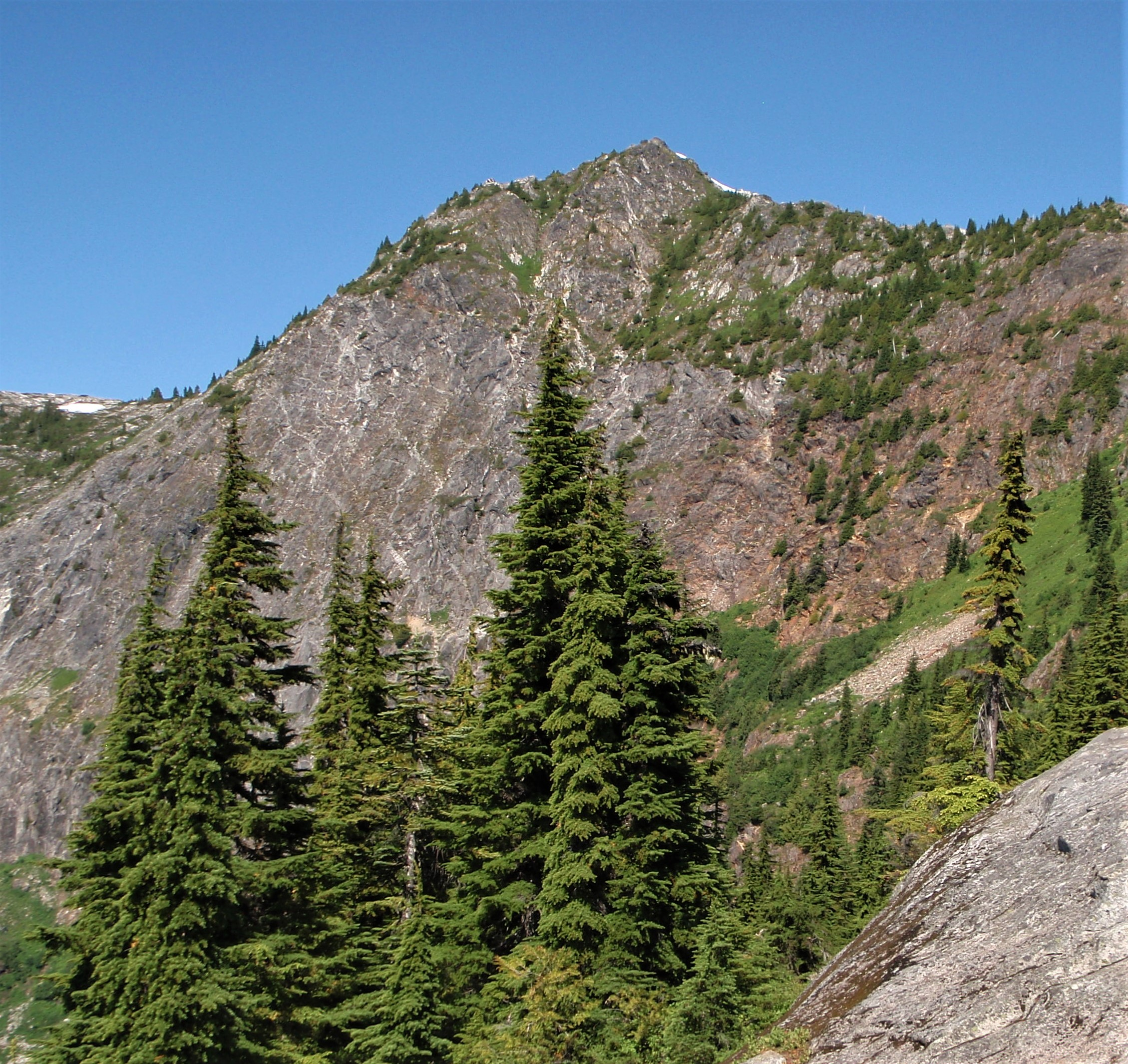
- Trappers Peak, southwest aspect

Highest point
- Elevation: 5,966 ft (1,818 m)
- Prominence: 566 ft (173 m)
- Parent peak: X Mountain (5,980 ft)
- Isolation: 0.48 mi (0.77 km)
- Coordinates: 48°41′18″N 121°19′21″W

Geography
- Location within Washington (state) Location within the United States
- Interactive map of Trappers Peak
- Country: United States
- State: Washington
- County: Whatcom
- Protected area: North Cascades National Park; Stephen Mather Wilderness
- Parent range: North Cascades
- Topo map: USGS Mount Triumph

Geology
- Rock age: Late Cretaceous
- Rock type: Skagit gneiss

Climbing
- Easiest route: scrambling

Trappers Peak is a 5,966-foot (1,818 m) elevation mountain summit located in the North Cascades of Washington state. It is situated within North Cascades National Park, Stephen Mather Wilderness, and Whatcom County. It rises steeply above Lower Thornton Lake which is set at the southwestern face of the mountain. Like many North Cascades peaks, Trappers Peak is more notable for its large, steep rise above local terrain than for its absolute elevation. Topographic relief is significant as the southeast aspect rises 5,500 feet (1,700 m) above the North Cascades Highway in approximately two miles. The nearest higher neighbor is Thornton Peak, 1.5 miles (2.4 km) to the northwest, Mount Triumph is two miles to the northwest, and Newhalem is three miles to the east-southeast. Precipitation runoff from the mountain drains into tributaries of the Skagit River. The summit of Trappers Peak is known for its grand view of the jagged peaks of the Picket Range.

== Climate ==
Trappers Peak is located in the marine west coast climate zone of western North America. Weather fronts originating in the Pacific Ocean travel northeast toward the Cascade Mountains. As fronts approach the North Cascades, they are forced upward by the peaks of the Cascade Range (orographic lift), causing them to drop their moisture in the form of rain or snowfall onto the Cascades. As a result, the west side of the North Cascades experiences high precipitation, especially during the winter months in the form of snowfall. Because of maritime influence, snow tends to be wet and heavy, resulting in avalanche danger. During winter months, weather is usually cloudy, but due to high pressure systems over the Pacific Ocean that intensify during summer months, there is often little or no cloud cover during the summer.

== Geology ==
The North Cascades features some of the most rugged topography in the Cascade Range with craggy peaks, ridges, and deep glacial valleys. Geological events occurring many years ago created the diverse topography and drastic elevation changes over the Cascade Range leading to the various climate differences. These climate differences lead to vegetation variety defining the ecoregions in this area.

The history of the formation of the Cascade Mountains dates back millions of years ago to the late Eocene Epoch. With the North American Plate overriding the Pacific Plate, episodes of volcanic igneous activity persisted. In addition, small fragments of the oceanic and continental lithosphere called terranes created the North Cascades about 50 million years ago.

During the Pleistocene period dating back over two million years ago, glaciation advancing and retreating repeatedly scoured the landscape leaving deposits of rock debris. The U-shaped cross section of the river valleys is a result of recent glaciation. Uplift and faulting in combination with glaciation have been the dominant processes which have created the tall peaks and deep valleys of the North Cascades area.

== Gallery ==
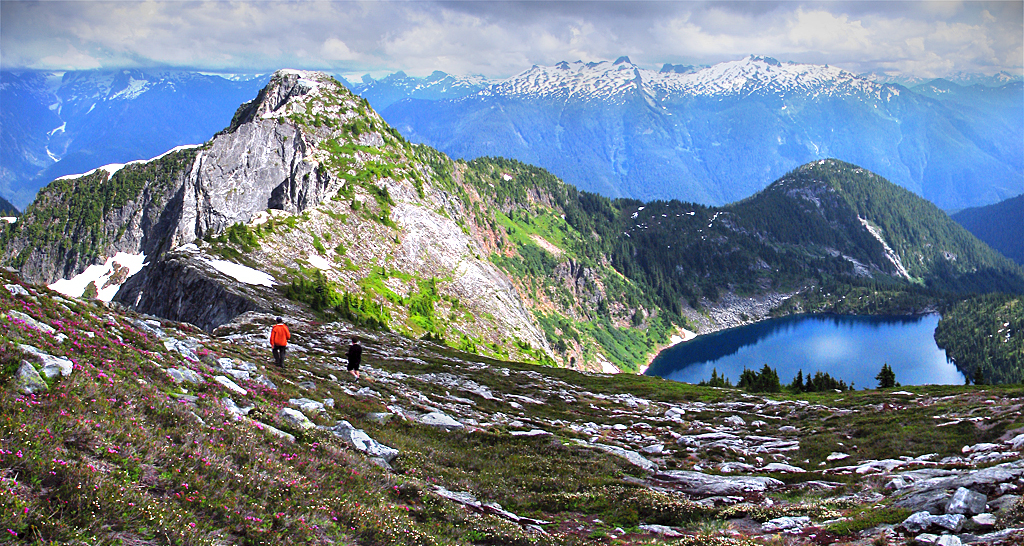
Trappers Peak and lower Thornton Lake from northwest

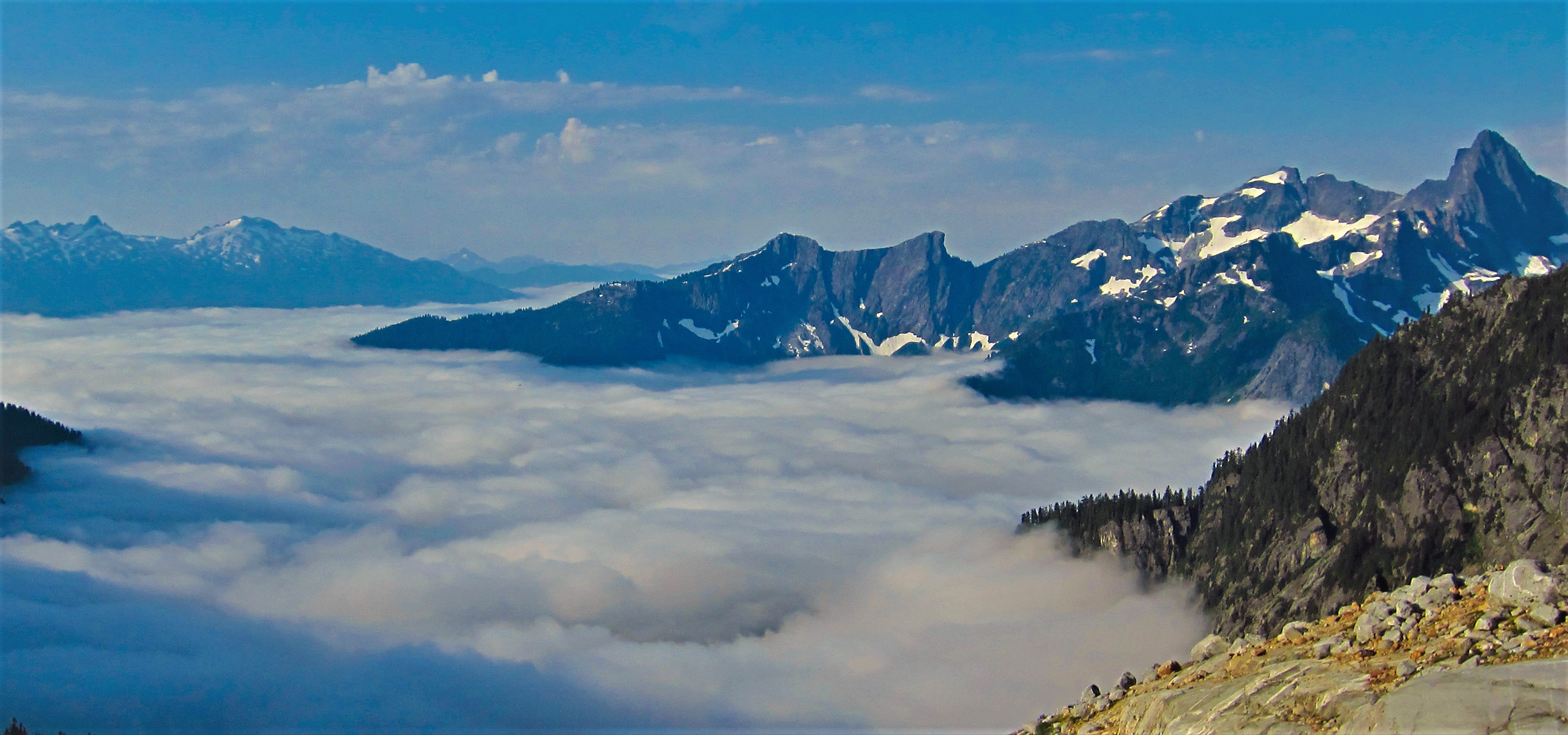
Looking south at Trappers Peak (centered), Mt. Triumph in upper right corner.

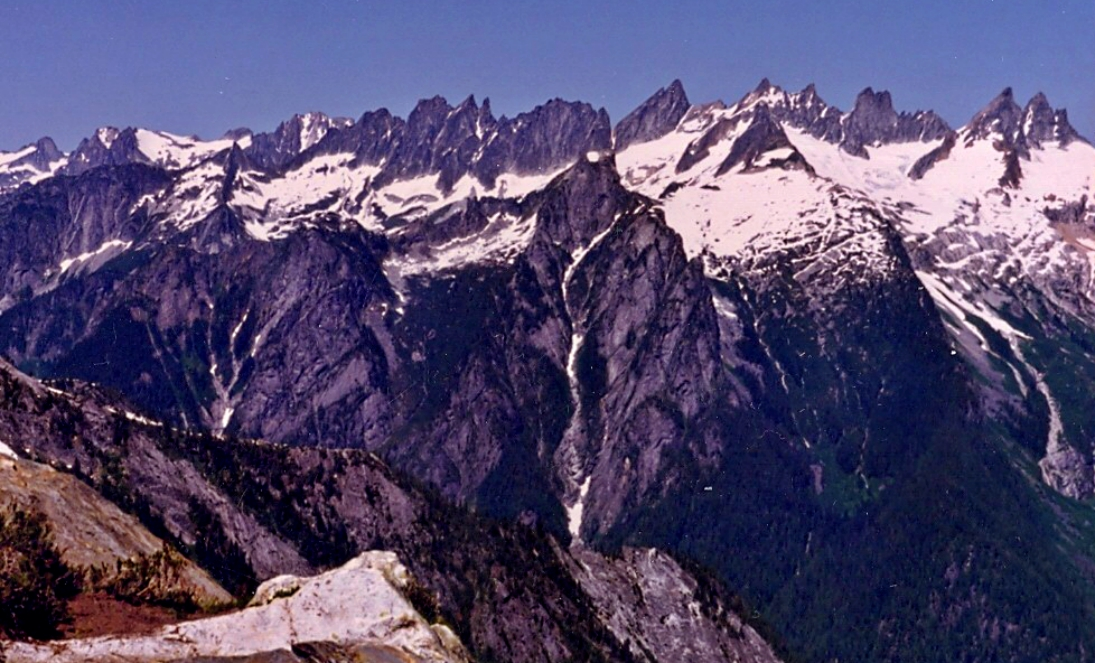
Picket Range from Trappers Peak

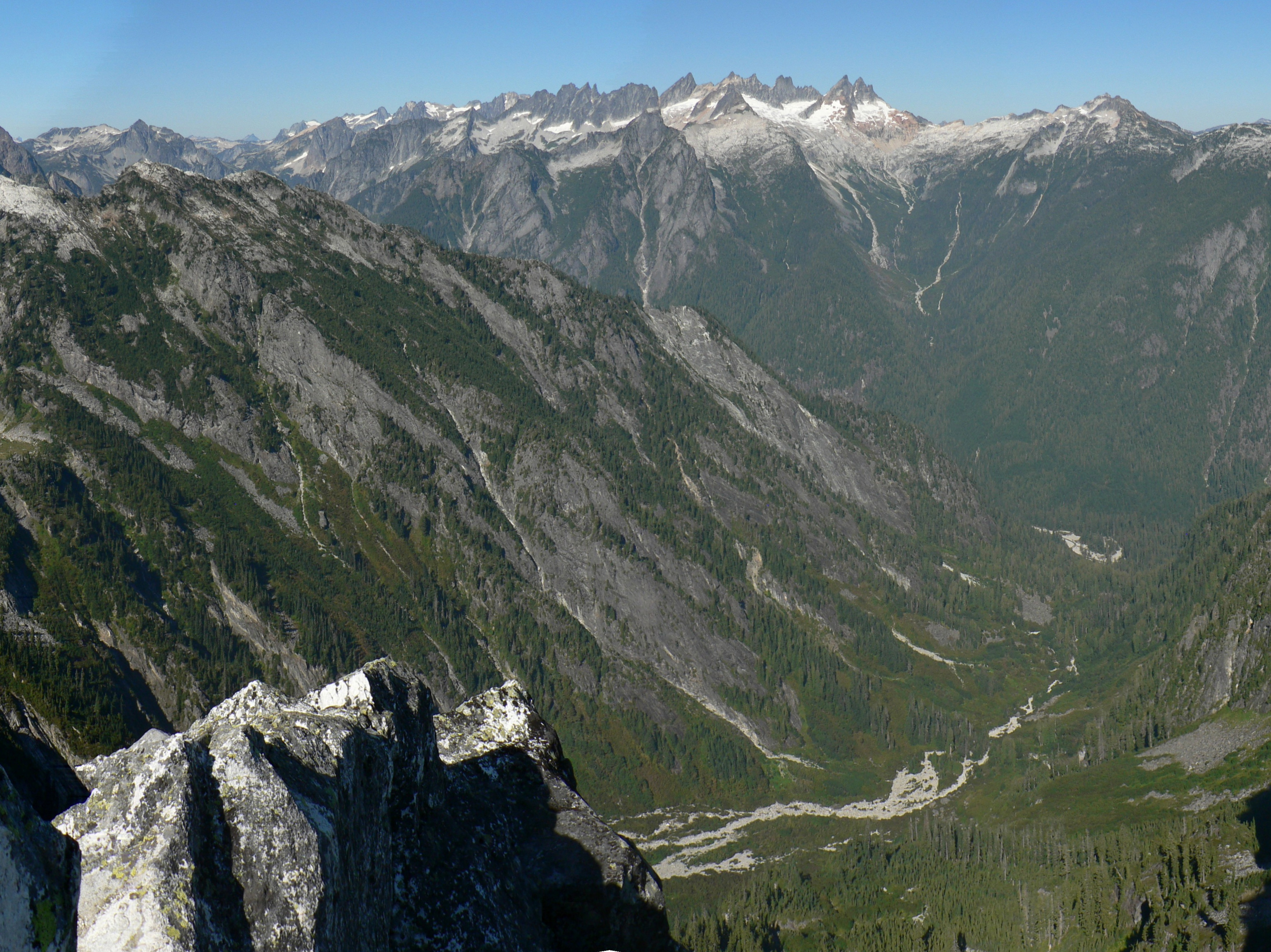
Picket Range from Trappers Peak

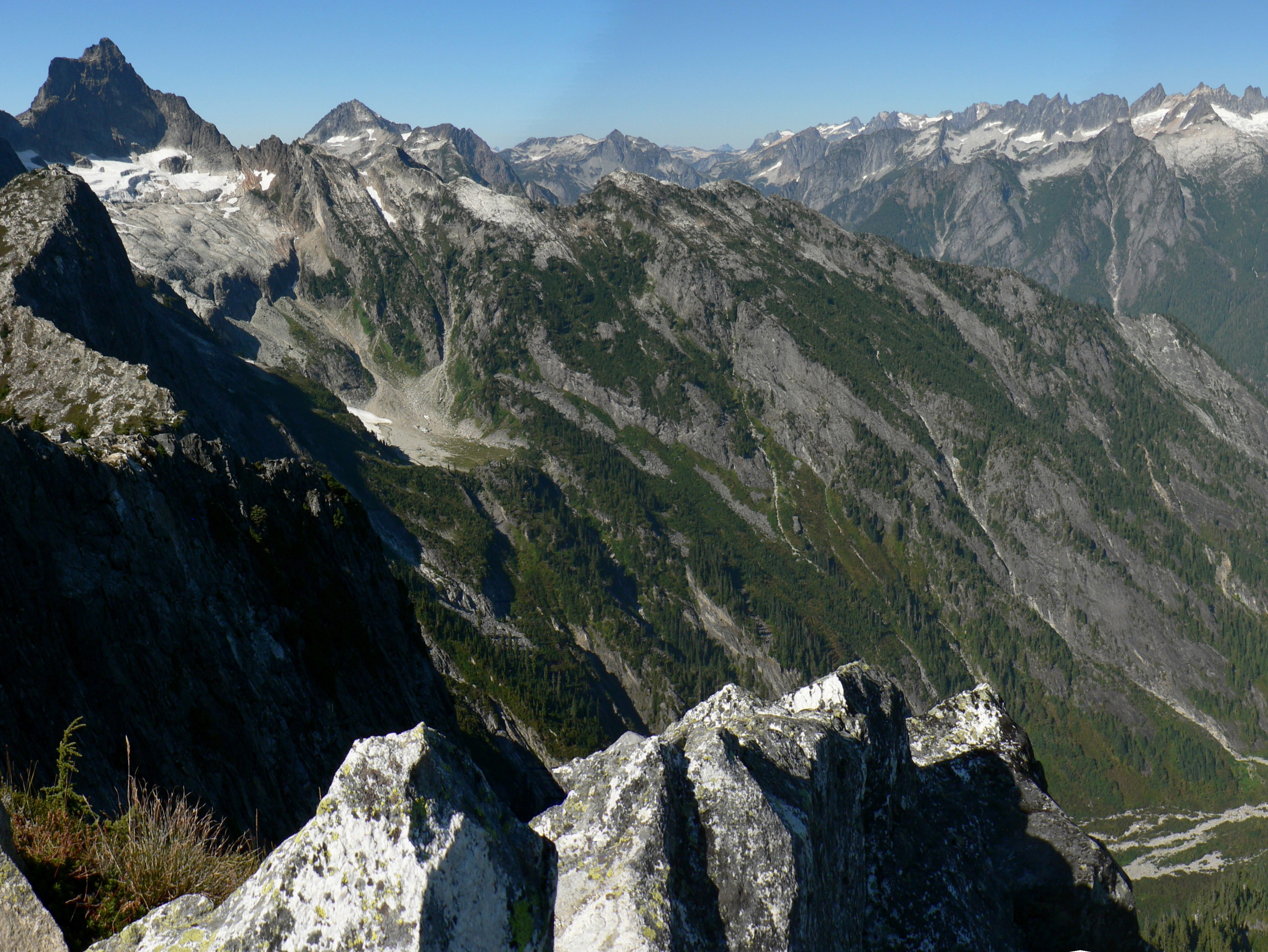
Mts. Triumph, Despair, and the Pickets from Trappers Peak

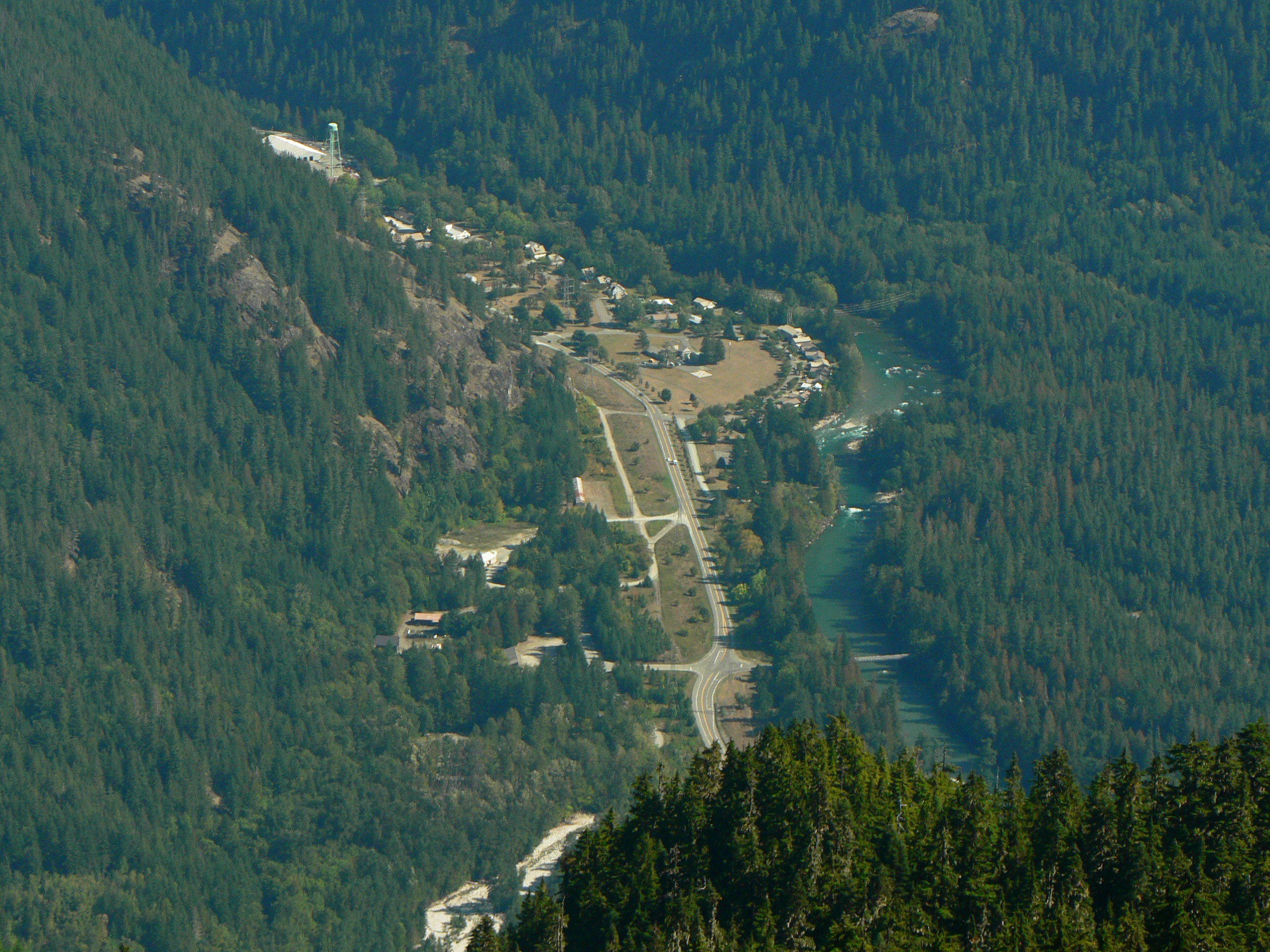
Newhalem, Washington seen from Trappers Peak

== See also ==
Geography of the North Cascades
