= Hagan Mountain =

Multi-peak mountain located in the North Cascades

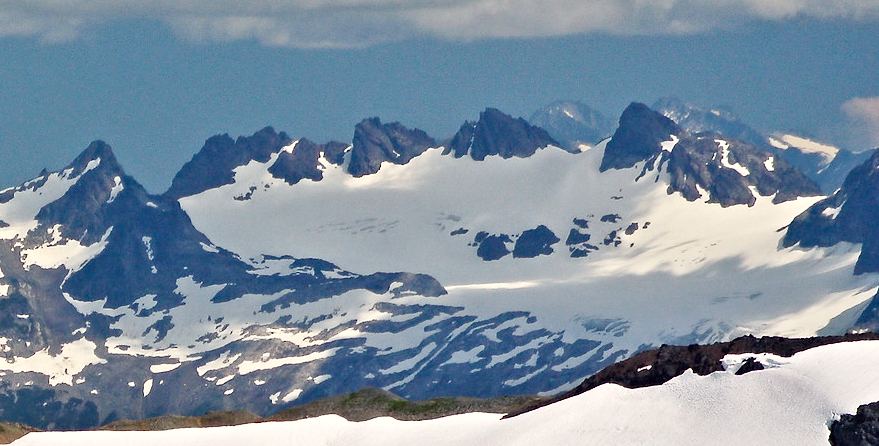
- Hagan Mountain seen from northwest

Highest point
- Elevation: 7,080+ ft (2,160+ m)
- Prominence: 600 ft (180 m)
- Parent peak: Mount Blum 7,685 ft (2342 m)
- Coordinates: 48°43′27″N 121°29′28″W

Geography
- Location within Washington (state) Location within the United States
- Interactive map of Hagan Mountain
- Country: United States
- State: Washington
- County: Whatcom
- Protected area: North Cascades National Park
- Parent range: North Cascades; Cascade Range
- Topo map: USGS Damnation Peak

Geology
- Rock type: phyllite

Climbing
- Easiest route: Scrambling class 3 and glacier travel

Hagan Mountain is a multi-peak mountain located in Whatcom County, Washington state, within North Cascades National Park. It has an elevation of 7,080-feet (2,160-metres). The mountain is situated approximately 12 mi (19 km) north of Marblemount.

Hagan Mountain is surrounded by other notable peaks in the North Cascades. Mount Blum, which is the nearest higher peak, lies 1.81 mi (2.91 km) to the north of Hagan Mountain. Bacon Peak is another prominent peak, located 4.45 mi (7.16 km) to the south.

The mountain features the expansive Hagan Glacier, as well as the smaller Hidden Creek Glacier. Precipitation runoff and meltwater from these glaciers flow into tributaries of the Skagit River, contributing to the water supply in the region.

== Climate ==
Hagan Mountain is situated in the marine west coast climate zone of western North America. In this region, weather fronts typically originate in the Pacific Ocean and move northeast towards the Cascade Mountains. As these fronts approach the North Cascades, they are forced upward by the peaks of the Cascade Range. This upward motion causes the moisture within the fronts to be released as precipitation in the form of rain or snowfall, a phenomenon known as Orographic lift.

The west side of the North Cascades, including Hagan Mountain, receives significant precipitation, particularly during the winter months when snowfall is common. The temperate climate of the area, combined with its proximity to the Pacific Ocean, means that temperatures rarely drop below 0 °F (−18 °C) or rise above 80 °F (27 °C) in regions west of the Cascade Crest.

During the winter, the weather is often cloudy due to the presence of low-pressure systems, while summers tend to have less cloud cover. High-pressure systems over the Pacific Ocean tend to intensify during the summer months, leading to clearer skies in the region. However, it's important to note that maritime influence still plays a role, and snowfall in the area can be wet and heavy, resulting in a high risk of avalanches.

== Geology ==
The North Cascades features some of the most rugged topography in the Cascade Range with craggy peaks, ridges, and deep glacial valleys. Geological events occurring many years ago created the diverse topography and drastic elevation changes over the Cascade Range, leading to the various climate differences.

The history of the formation of the Cascade Mountains dates back millions of years ago to the late Eocene Epoch. With the North American Plate overriding the Pacific Plate, episodes of volcanic igneous activity persisted. In addition, small fragments of the oceanic and continental lithosphere called terranes created the North Cascades about 50 million years ago.

During the Pleistocene period dating back over two million years ago, glaciation advancing and retreating repeatedly scoured and shaped the landscape. The U-shaped cross-section of the river valleys is a result of recent glaciation. Uplift and faulting in combination with glaciation have been the dominant processes which have created the tall peaks and deep valleys of the North Cascades area.

== Gallery ==
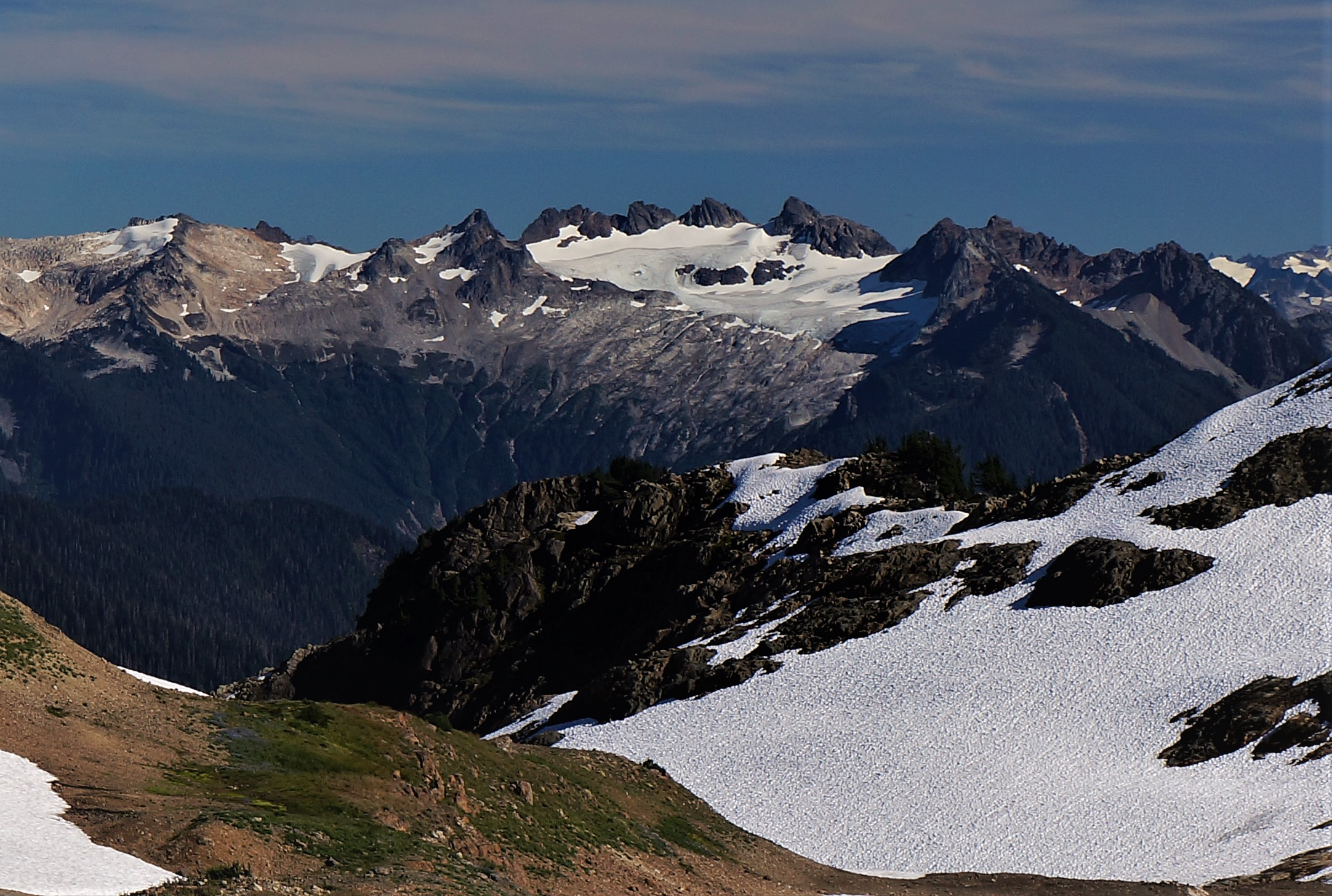
Northwest aspect

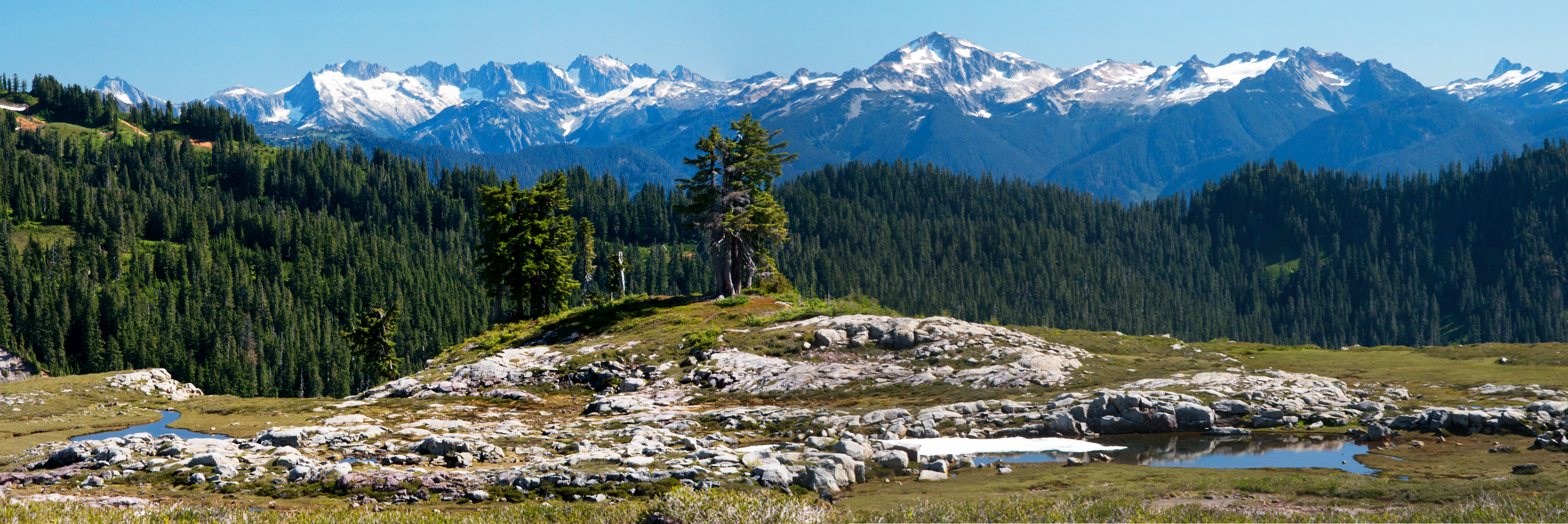
Northern Pickets, Mount Blum, and Hagan (right) from the upper meadow below Park Butte

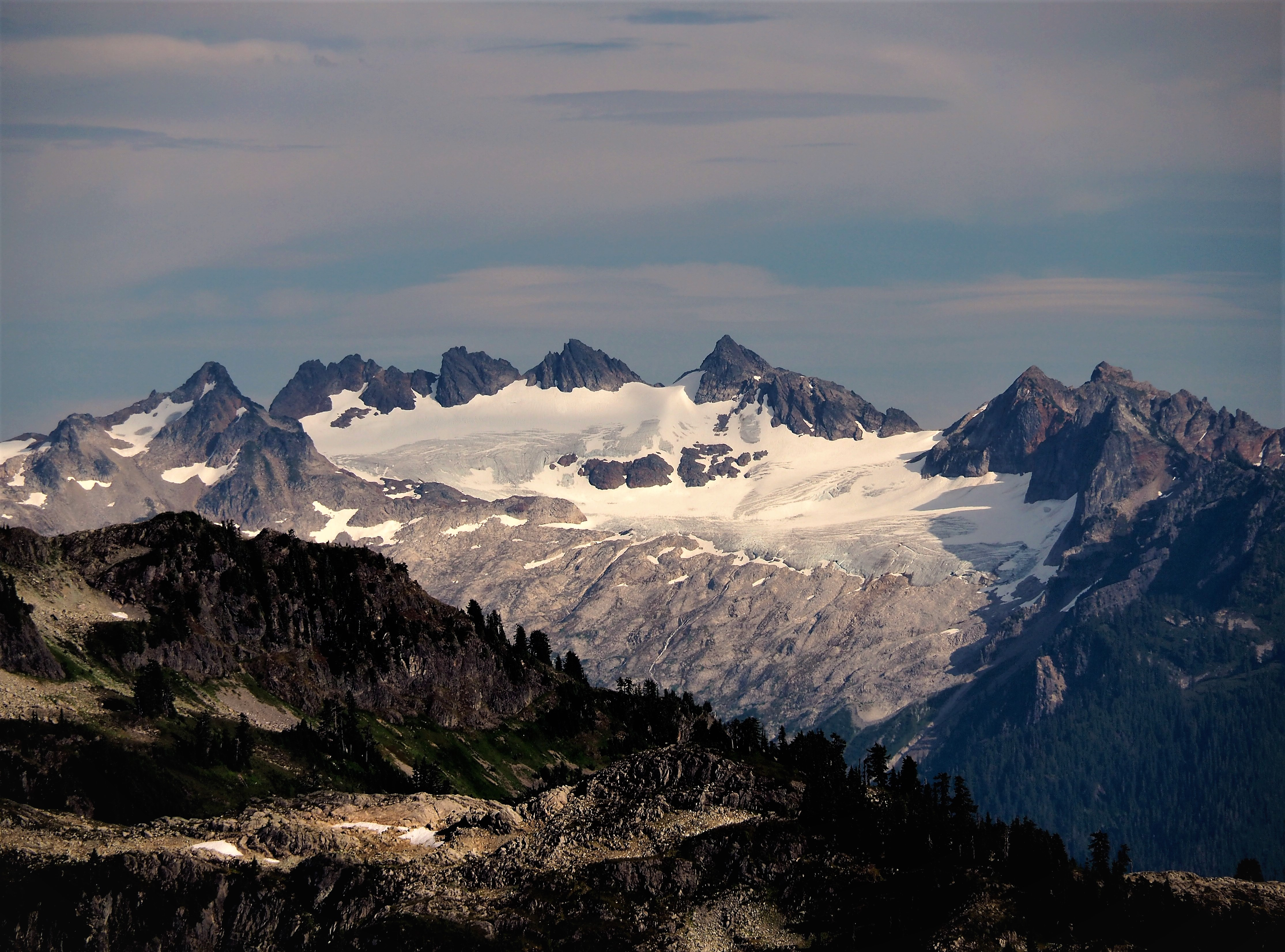
Hagan Mountain

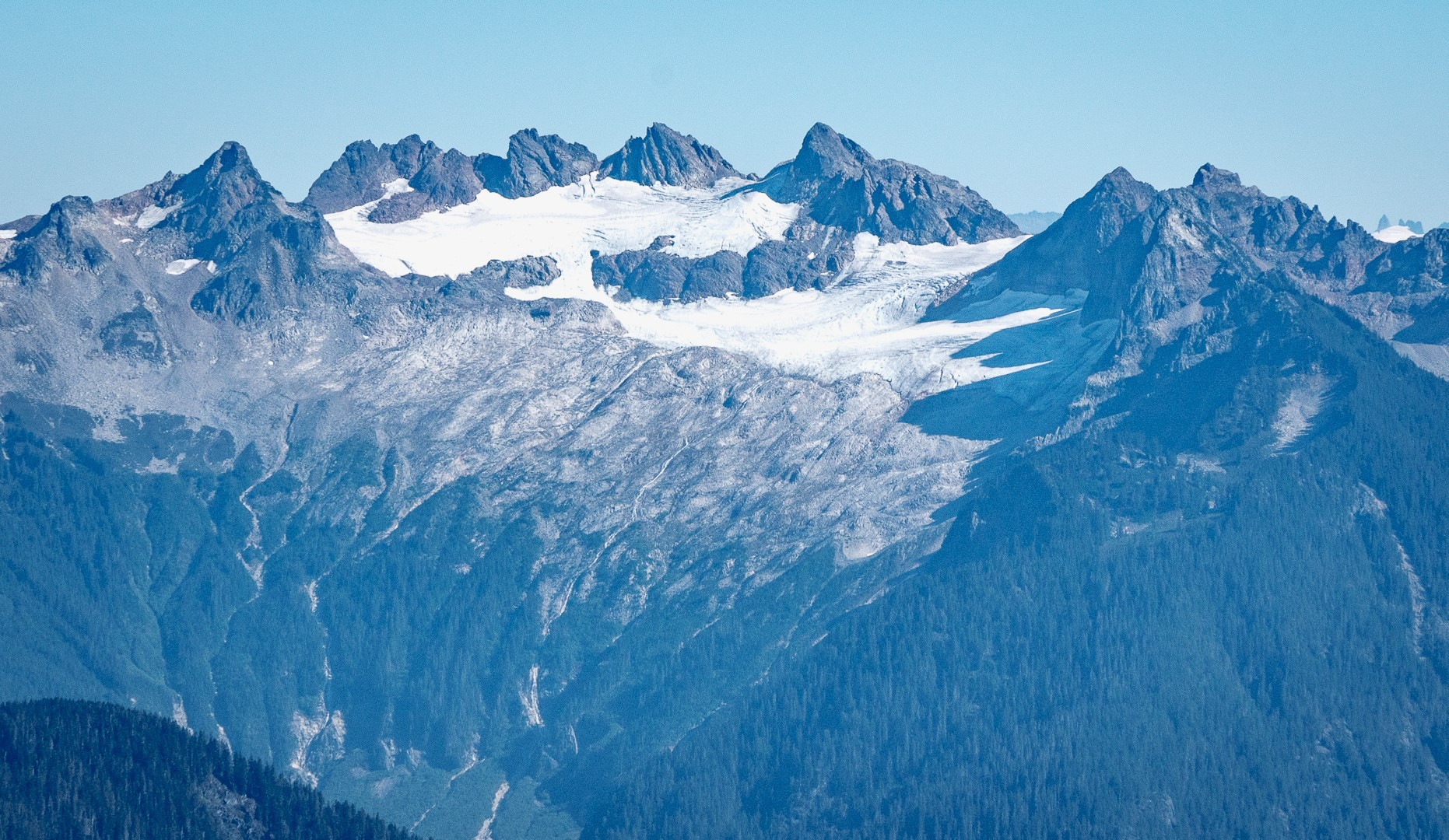
Hagan Mountain

== See also ==
- Geography of the North Cascades
- Geology of the Pacific Northwest
