= Blum Basin Falls =

Waterfall in Whatcom County, Washington

- Interactive map of Blum Basin Falls
- Location: North Cascades National Park, Whatcom County, Washington
- Coordinates: 48.73368°N 121.50263°W
- Type: Segmented
- Elevation: 5,610 feet (1,710 m)
- Total height: 1,680 feet (510 m)
- Number of drops: More than 3
- Longest drop: 900 feet (270 m)
- Total width: 10 feet (3.0 m)
- Average width: 10 feet (3.0 m)
- Watercourse: Blum Creek
- Average flow rate: 100 cubic feet (2.8 m^{3}) per second
- World height ranking: 84

Blum Basin Falls is a waterfall in Whatcom County, in the U.S. state of Washington. It is located in North Cascades National Park on the headwaters of Blum Creek, a tributary of the Baker River. Fed by two small retreating glaciers and several snowfields on the southern side of Mount Blum, the waterfall is formed by the largest meltwater stream that feeds the mainstem of Blum Creek. The falls tumble 1,680 feet (510 m) down a high glacial headwall several miles within the national park in two distinct stages; the first is a series of slides over rounded rock, above the tree line, and the second is a series of near-vertical plunges to the forested valley below. Although most of the falls is clearly visible, parts of it are obscured by tall pines that grow at its base. There is no trail leading to the waterfall.

== Etymology ==
The falls takes its name from the creek, which in turn receives its name from Mount Blum, which was named for John Blum, a United States Forest Service fire patrol pilot killed in an early 20th-century plane crash.

== Statistics ==
The series of cascades totals 1,680 feet (510 m) in height, although this distance has never been officially measured. The falls occur over a 1,500-foot (460 m) run of Blum Creek, although again, this distance is only approximated. During peak flow, when high temperatures accelerate melting of ice and snow in the upper basin, the creek may be able to flow over 100 cubic feet (2.8 m^{3}) per second, with an average width of 10 feet (3.0 m). Contrarily, during low winter temperatures, the ice and snow ceases to melt, and the falls diminish in volume or may stop flowing completely.

== History and access ==
In 1920, the first reported sighting of the falls was by Pacific Northwest photographer Asahel Curtis, who also photographed the falls. However, as that date was before Mount Blum was named, the waterfall was also unknown and unnamed, and remains obscure to this day. Today, the Baker River Trail leads upstream several miles along the Baker River, and as it crosses Blum Creek, one may obtain a view of the upper portion of the falls. The falls is also visible from a portion of the Shuksan Lakes Trail, which climbs Mount Shuksan on the opposite side of the Baker River valley. From this trail better views are obtained. However, as the falls are not the best in the area, and as more well-known Sulphide Creek Falls is close, the falls are little-known by most visitors to the area.

== See also ==
- List of waterfalls
- Sulphide Creek Falls
