= Thornton Lakes =

Group of lakes in Whatcom County, Washington, USA

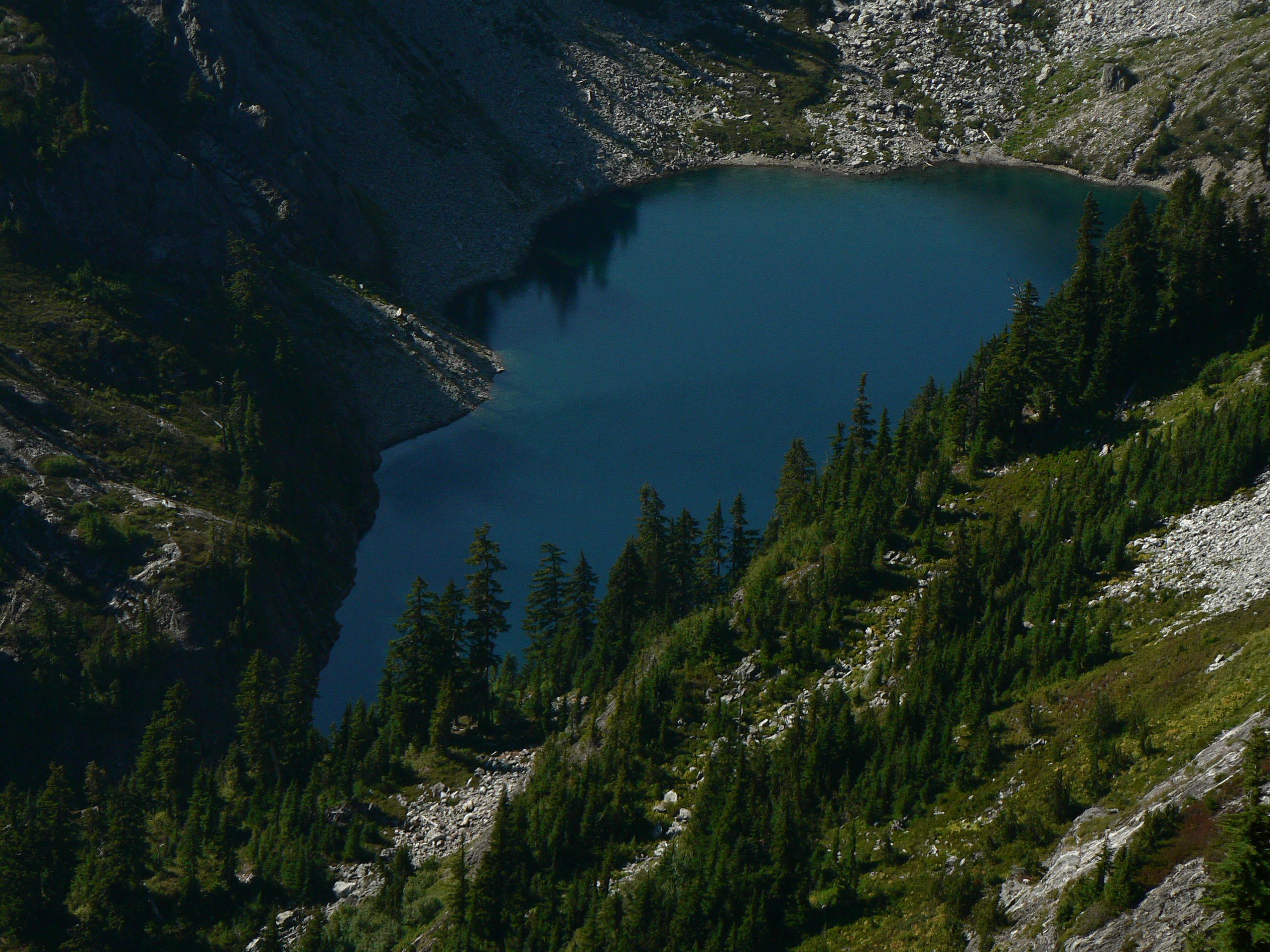
- The middle lake of the Thornton Lakes group

- Location within Washington (state) Location within the United States
- Location: North Cascades National Park, Whatcom County, Washington, United States
- Coordinates: 48°41′16″N 121°19′57″W
- Type: Cirque Lakes
- Primary outflows: Thornton Creek
- Basin countries: United States
- Max. length: 800 yd (730 m)
- Max. width: 400 yd (370 m)
- Surface elevation: 4,708 ft (1,435 m)

Thornton Lakes are located in North Cascades National Park, in the U. S. state of Washington. These paternoster lakes consist of three lakes located 1 to 1.75 mi (1.61 to 2.82 km) southeast of Mount Triumph. Thornton Lakes can be accessed on foot from a trailhead in Ross Lake National Recreation Area. The hike of 5.2 mi (8.4 km) includes a 2,400-foot (730 m) altitude gain and a 500-foot (150 m) descent to Lower Thornton Lake. Two other lakes lie above the first one, unofficially named Middle and Upper Thornton Lakes. A designated backcountry camping zone is located at Lower Thornton Lake.
