= Newhalem, Washington =

Unincorporated community in Washington, United States

- Unincorporated community
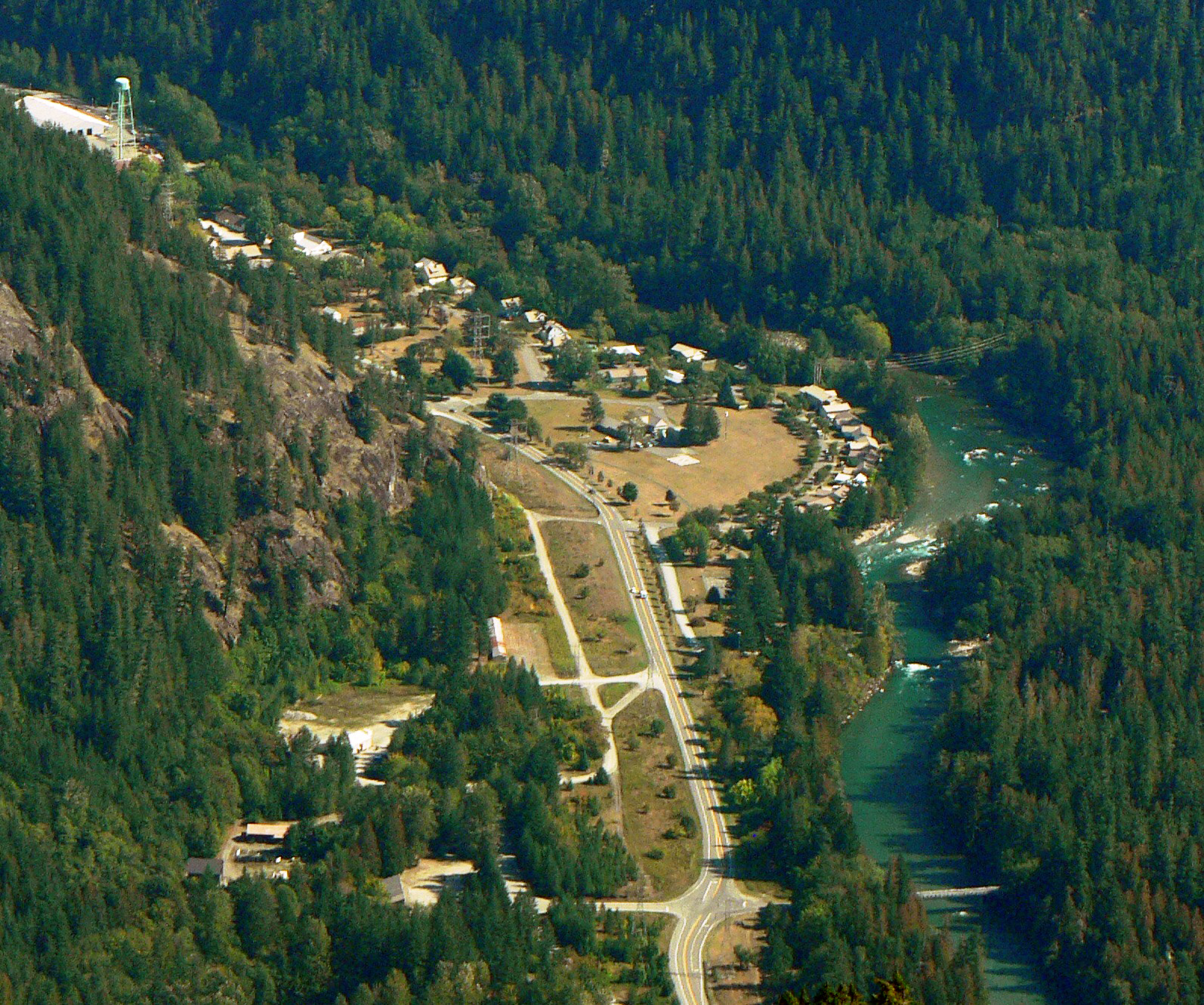
- Newhalem from nearby Trappers Peak, North Cascades National Park

- Location within Washington (state) Location within the United States
- Coordinates: 48°40′25″N 121°14′50″W
- Country: United States
- State: Washington
- County: Whatcom

Government
  - Type: Unincorporated community
  - Body: Whatcom County
- Elevation: 515 ft (157 m)
- Time zone: UTC-8 (Pacific (PST))
  - Summer (DST): UTC-7 (PDT)
- ZIP Code: 98283
- Area code(s): 360, 564
- GNIS feature ID: 1523641

Newhalem (Lushootseed: dxʷʔiyb) is a small unincorporated community on the Skagit River in the western foothills of the North Cascades, in Whatcom County, northwestern Washington, United States.

== Description ==
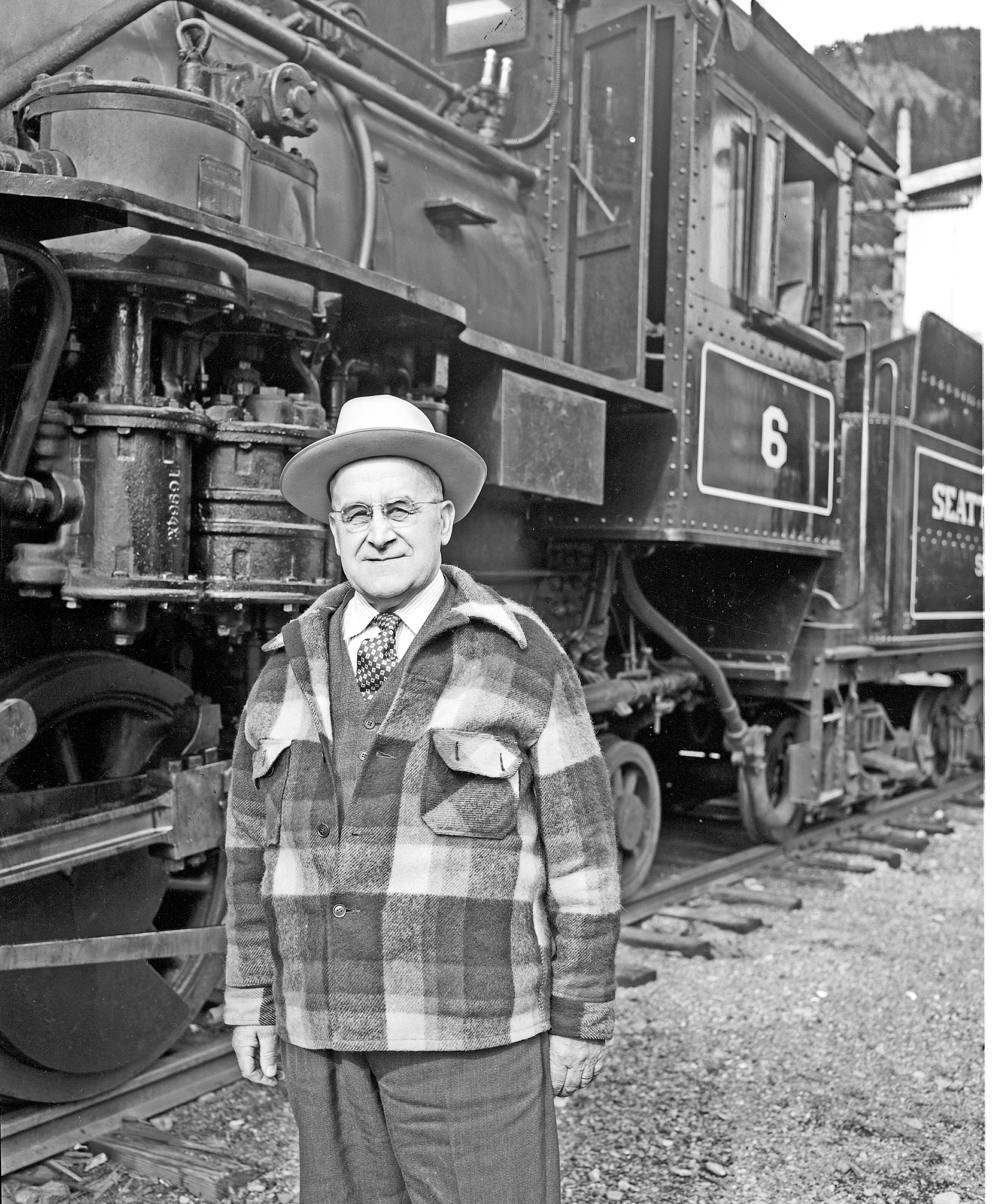
Dana Currier, one of the key figures in the creation of Newhalem, poses in 1954 with the 2-6-2 locomotive built for Seattle City Light by Baldwin Locomotive Works in 1928 and known as "Old Number Six"

Newhalem is a company town owned by Seattle City Light with residency limited to employees and contractors of the Skagit River Hydroelectric Project, or of local county, state or federal agencies. Newhalem is located entirely within the Ross Lake National Recreation Area and the North Cascades National Park boundary is approximately one mile to the north and south of the town. Newhalem does not have an assigned US Postal Service zip code and thus, for postal purposes, is considered part of Rockport (98283).

The name Newhalem has its roots in a local indigenous language as meaning 'Goat Snare', as the natives used to trap mountain goats in the area.

In pre-colonial times, the site was inhabited by members of the Upper Skagits.

On every third weekend of July since 1977 there is a softball tournament held between competitors hailing from across the Skagit Valley.

There was a school in Newhalem a long time ago but it was demolished because the population had severely dropped. Now the students have about a 1 1/2-hour bus to Concrete.

== Climate ==
Newhalem has plentiful rainfall year-round, but with significantly less rainfall in the summer months than in winter. According to the Köppen climate classification, Newhalem has an oceanic climate (Cfb).

Climate data for Newhalem, Washington, 1991–2020 normals, extremes 1909–present
Month	Jan	Feb	Mar	Apr	May	Jun	Jul	Aug	Sep	Oct	Nov	Dec	Year
Record high °F (°C)	63 (17)	71 (22)	78 (26)	91 (33)	101 (38)	113 (45)	109 (43)	108 (42)	99 (37)	83 (28)	74 (23)	61 (16)	113 (45)
Mean maximum °F (°C)	48.8 (9.3)	52.8 (11.6)	63.3 (17.4)	75.7 (24.3)	86.4 (30.2)	89.8 (32.1)	94.5 (34.7)	93.8 (34.3)	86.8 (30.4)	70.5 (21.4)	54.9 (12.7)	48.5 (9.2)	97.3 (36.3)
Mean daily maximum °F (°C)	40.1 (4.5)	43.7 (6.5)	49.4 (9.7)	57.9 (14.4)	66.5 (19.2)	70.4 (21.3)	78.0 (25.6)	78.6 (25.9)	71.0 (21.7)	57.0 (13.9)	45.4 (7.4)	39.5 (4.2)	58.1 (14.5)
Daily mean °F (°C)	36.2 (2.3)	38.3 (3.5)	42.2 (5.7)	48.7 (9.3)	56.1 (13.4)	60.2 (15.7)	65.8 (18.8)	66.4 (19.1)	60.6 (15.9)	50.3 (10.2)	41.2 (5.1)	36.0 (2.2)	50.2 (10.1)
Mean daily minimum °F (°C)	32.2 (0.1)	32.9 (0.5)	35.0 (1.7)	39.5 (4.2)	45.7 (7.6)	49.9 (9.9)	53.7 (12.1)	54.3 (12.4)	50.3 (10.2)	43.7 (6.5)	36.9 (2.7)	32.5 (0.3)	42.2 (5.7)
Mean minimum °F (°C)	22.1 (−5.5)	25.0 (−3.9)	28.1 (−2.2)	32.2 (0.1)	36.7 (2.6)	43.1 (6.2)	47.6 (8.7)	47.8 (8.8)	43.4 (6.3)	35.1 (1.7)	27.8 (−2.3)	23.2 (−4.9)	15.7 (−9.1)
Record low °F (°C)	0 (−18)	4 (−16)	14 (−10)	23 (−5)	30 (−1)	35 (2)	39 (4)	40 (4)	32 (0)	20 (−7)	7 (−14)	5 (−15)	0 (−18)
Average precipitation inches (mm)	12.40 (315)	7.16 (182)	8.36 (212)	4.65 (118)	3.01 (76)	2.58 (66)	1.40 (36)	1.68 (43)	3.55 (90)	8.78 (223)	13.58 (345)	11.70 (297)	78.85 (2,003)
Average snowfall inches (cm)	10.2 (26)	7.7 (20)	2.8 (7.1)	0.1 (0.25)	0.0 (0.0)	0.0 (0.0)	0.0 (0.0)	0.0 (0.0)	0.0 (0.0)	0.0 (0.0)	2.4 (6.1)	6.3 (16)	29.5 (75)
Average extreme snow depth inches (cm)	8.3 (21)	4.8 (12)	2.5 (6.4)	0.1 (0.25)	0.0 (0.0)	0.0 (0.0)	0.0 (0.0)	0.0 (0.0)	0.0 (0.0)	0.0 (0.0)	1.1 (2.8)	7.5 (19)	12.4 (31)
Average precipitation days (≥ 0.01 in)	18.5	15.2	19.1	16.5	13.2	12.8	6.7	6.6	11.3	17.3	20.6	19.1	176.9
Average snowy days (≥ 0.1 in)	3.3	2.5	1.6	0.1	0.0	0.0	0.0	0.0	0.0	0.0	1.5	3.1	12.1
Source: NOAA

== Newhalem in literature and film ==
The writer Tobias Wolff lived in Newhalem as a boy in the late 1950s, after his mother moved from west Seattle to marry a mechanic who lived in one of the company houses. In his memoir, This Boy's Life, he calls this isolated settlement "Chinook," and describes how the nearest high school was a long bus ride away, in a slightly larger hamlet called Concrete. In the 1993 film version of This Boy's Life, starring Robert De Niro and Leonardo DiCaprio, the two places are combined and called "Concrete."

Portions of the 1983 Hollywood movie WarGames, starring Matthew Broderick, were filmed in Newhalem (most notably the scenes of the "Cheyenne Mountain Complex", filmed in an abandoned gravel pit northwest of the town).
