= Sulphide Creek Falls =

Waterfall in North Cascades National Park, Washington

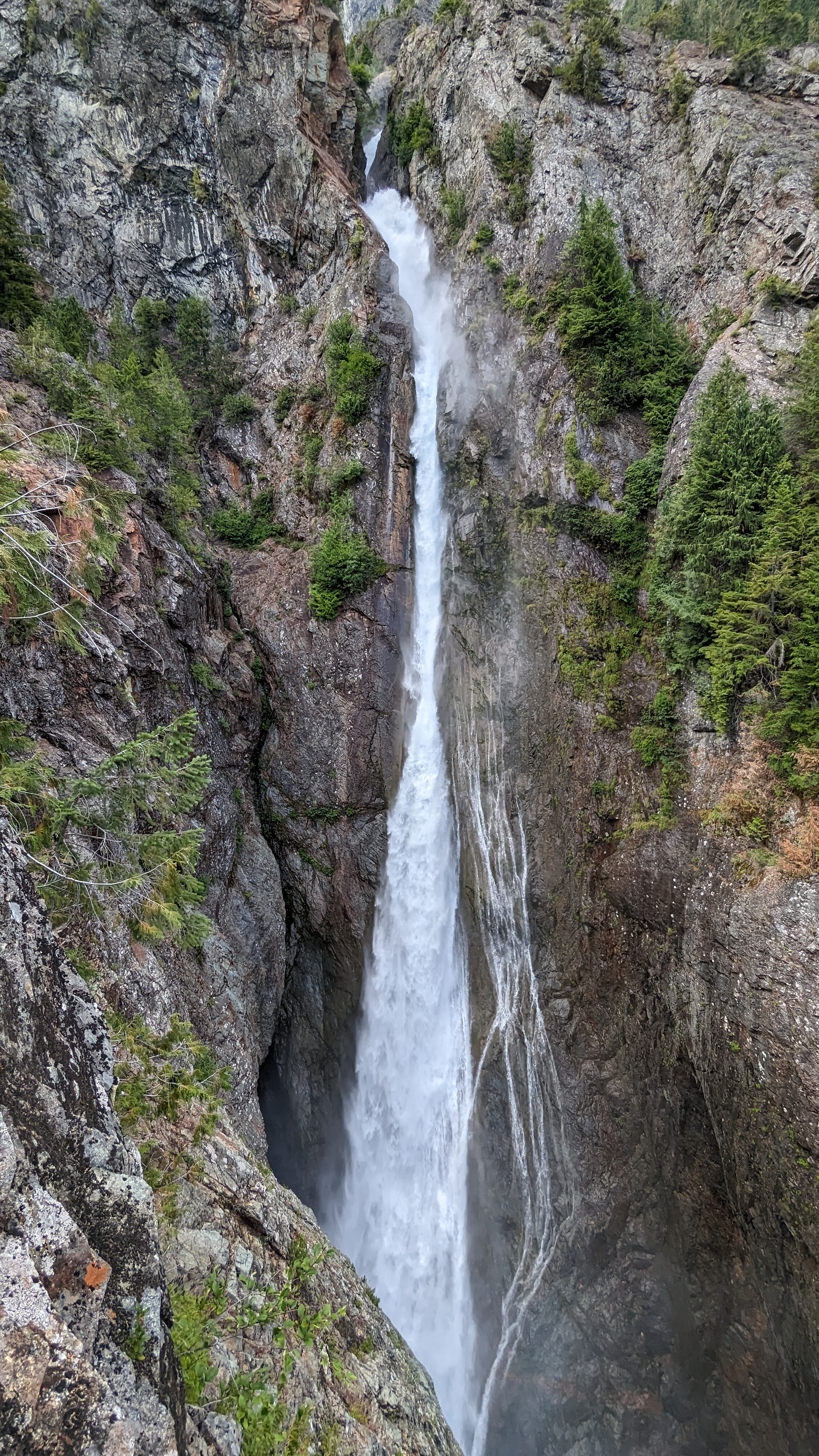

- Location within Washington (state)
- Location: North Cascades National Park, Whatcom County, Washington, United States
- Coordinates: 48°47′47″N 121°34′32″W
- Type: Tiered
- Total height: 2,182 feet (665 m)
- Average width: 50 feet (15 m)
- Watercourse: Sulphide Creek
- Average flow rate: 500 cubic feet per second (14 m^{3}/s)

Sulphide Creek Falls is a tall, moderately large volume waterfall within North Cascades National Park in Washington state that is one of the tallest waterfalls in North America. The falls drop from Sulphide Lake (elevation 3,800 ft (1,200 m)) on the southeast side of Mount Shuksan down a narrow flume-like canyon to a broad basin below. Because of the narrow, twisting shape of the canyon the waterfall is exceptionally difficult to see from ground-level perspectives. The total vertical drop of the waterfall is in the range of 2,100 feet (640 m) to 2,200 feet (670 m) feet, but it has not yet been accurately measured. Foot access to the bottom of the waterfall involves 2.5 miles (4.0 km) of off-trail travel in extremely brushy terrain and several potentially dangerous fords of a large stream.

== Other waterfalls ==
Another waterfall, which is on the opposite side of the valley and joins Sulphide Creek Falls at its base, should not be confused with Sulphide Creek Falls. This falls is much more visible, but only about one-half as high as Sulphide Creek Falls. This falls is sometimes referred to as Sulphide Valley Falls. Above Sulphide Lake is a further 1,000 feet (300 m) of cascades, informally referred to as Sulphide Basin Falls, flowing from the Sulphide and Crystal Glaciers, which provide most of the water that flows over Sulphide Creek Falls. This drop is geographically separate from Sulphide Creek Falls, and should not be confused with it, despite their close proximity and location on the same feeder stream.

== Access ==
There is no trail to Sulphide Creek Falls. The closest trail is the Baker River Trail, which parallels the Baker River (which Sulphide Creek flows into). The trail crosses Sulphide Creek at the confluence. From there, one must proceed upstream along the wide, rocky streambed, which continues to within about 1 mile (1.6 km) of the base of the falls. Thick avalanche brush prevents further access.

== See also ==
- List of waterfalls
