= Sulphide Lake =

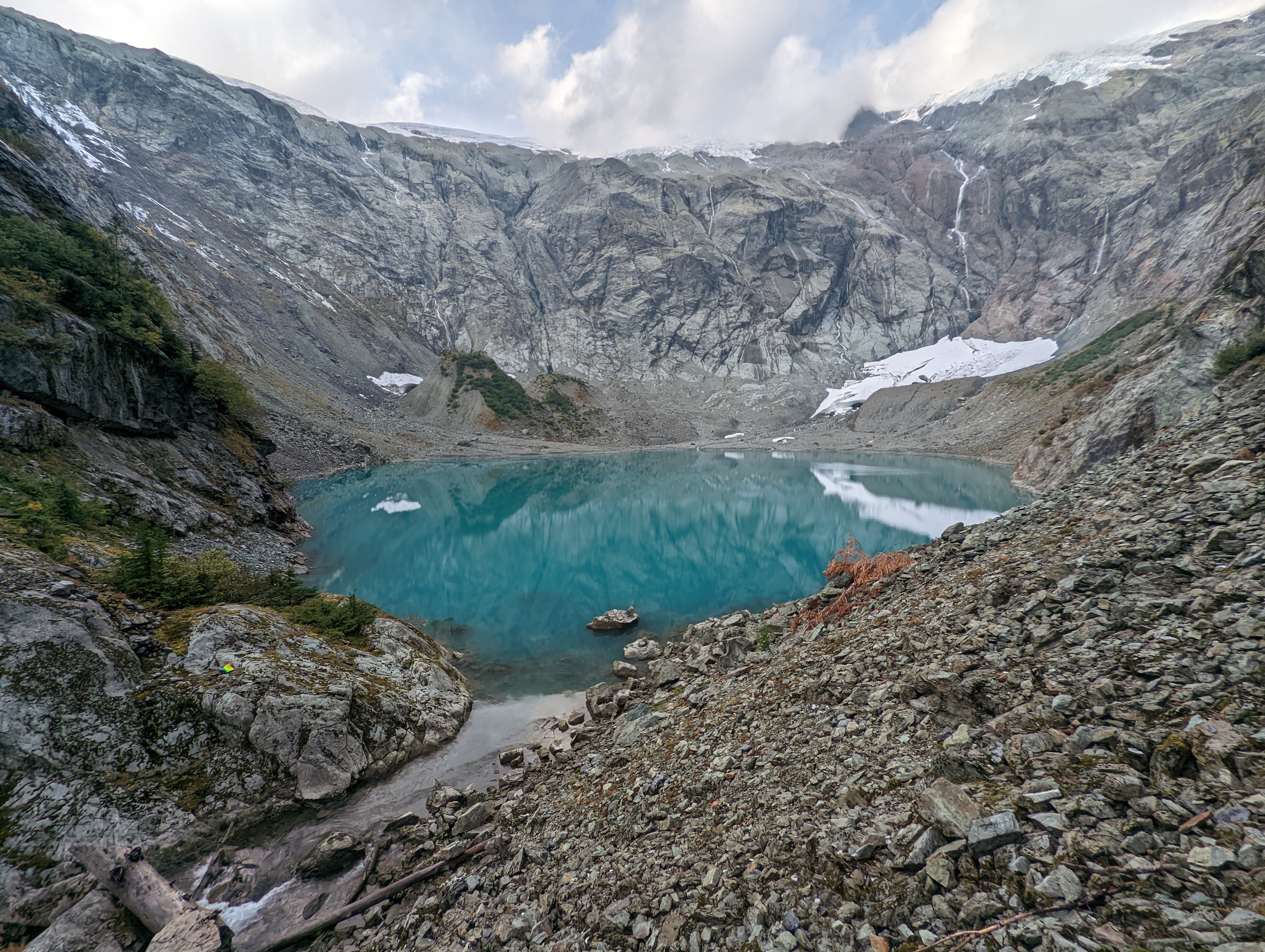

- Location within Washington (state) Location within the United States
- Location: North Cascades National Park, Whatcom County, Washington, United States
- Coordinates: 48°48′17″N 121°35′02″W
- Type: Glacial lake
- Primary outflows: Sulphide Creek
- Basin countries: United States
- Max. length: .65 mi (1.05 km)
- Max. width: .20 mi (0.32 km)
- Surface elevation: 3,806 ft (1,160 m)

Sulphide Lake is located in North Cascades National Park, in the U. S. state of Washington. Sulphide Lake lies in a cirque on the southeast slopes of Mount Shuksan. Several major cascades drop as much as 1,000 ft (300 m) into Sulphide Lake including Sulphide Basin Falls which is from melt off the Sulphide Glacier. After Sulphide Creek drains from Sulphide lake, it then plunges at least 2,000 ft (610 m) over a series of cascades called Sulphide Creek Falls, which is one of the tallest waterfalls in the U.S.

The lake is in a basin with near vertical walls and the rock is phyllite and greenschist. Above the lake on the cliffs below Crystal Glacier a 0.3 mile wide band stained red in color (from iron oxide) is exposed that runs for about 2.5 miles. This band is rich in the iron sulfides pyrite and pyrrhotite. Presumably this is the source of the lake's name.
