= Sulphide Glacier =

Glacier in the state of Washington

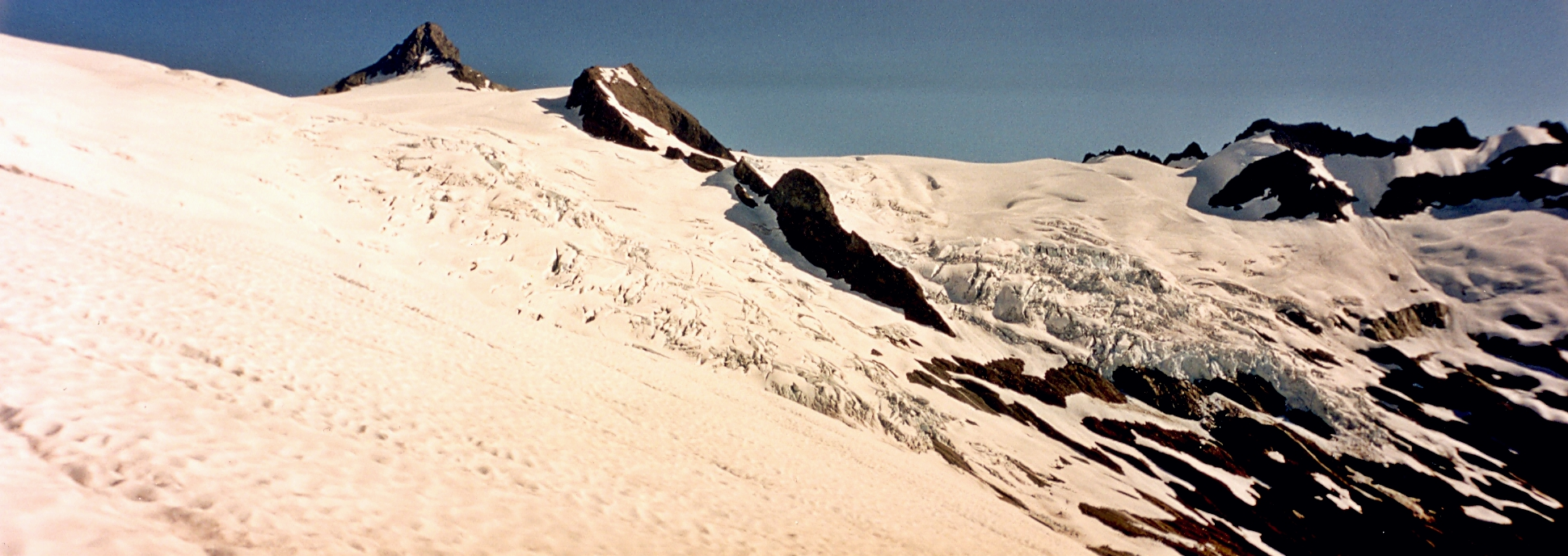
- Sulphide Glacier (left) and Crystal Glacier (right)

- Location within Washington (state)
- Type: Mountain glacier
- Location: Whatcom County, Washington, U.S.
- Coordinates: 48°48′47″N 121°36′23″W
- Length: 1.85 mi (2.98 km)
- Terminus: Barren rock/icefall
- Status: Retreating

Sulphide Glacier is in North Cascades National Park in the U.S. state of Washington, on the south slopes of Mount Shuksan. Descending 1.85 mi (2.98 km) from the summit tower of Mount Shuksan, it is connected to Crystal Glacier to the east. Sulphide Glacier descends from 8,600 to 5,600 ft (2,600 to 1,700 m). Sulphide Glacier is along the route taken when Mount Shuksan was first climbed in 1906. Both Sulphide and Crystal Glaciers have a series of 300-to-1,000-foot-high (91 to 305 m) cascades which are collectively referred to as Sulphide Basin Falls. Below these cascades lies Sulphide Lake, which empties over Sulphide Creek Falls, one of the highest waterfalls in North America with a nearly 2,200 ft (670 m) drop.

== See also ==
- List of glaciers in the United States
