= Bulger list =

List of mountains in Washington state

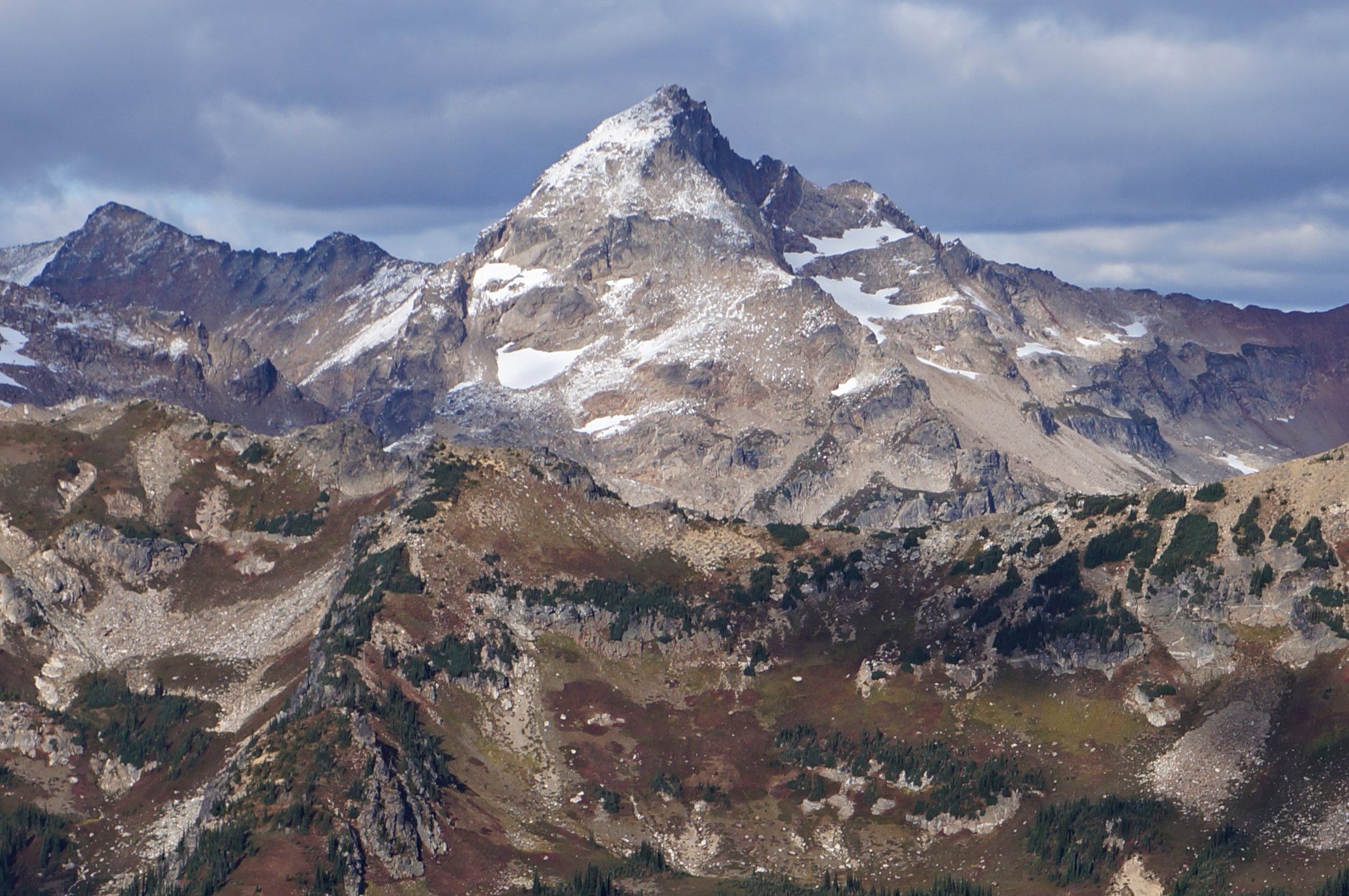
Chiwawa Mountain, one of the mountains on the list

The Bulger list is a list of 100 of the highest mountains in Washington state. The first person to climb every summit on the list was Russ Kroeker, who completed the list in 1980. As of July 2026, the list has been completed by 108 people.

== Origin ==
The Bulger list was compiled by John Lixvar and John Plimpton, who belonged to an informal group of climbers in the 1970s, after the US Geologic Survey finished publishing 7.5 minute topographic maps for the Cascades. The list was compiled using a 400-foot prominence threshold to differentiate between separate mountains versus sub-summits, with some exceptions: some peaks with less prominence, but which had official names given by the USGS were included, and the prominence threshold was increased to 800 feet for volcanos.

The mountains of Castle Peak, Luna Peak, and Mount Ballard, Liberty Cap, Sherman Peak, Colfax Peak, and Lincoln Peak were omitted from the list despite being tall enough and over 400 feet prominence. All seven appeared on a competing list of Washington's 100 highest peaks, being replaced on the Bulger list by Seven Fingered Jack, Sahale Peak, Dark Peak, Mount Rahm, Horseshoe Peak, Little Annapurna, and Blackcap Mountain, not all of which have 400 feet of prominence. As of 2021, 19 people had climbed the competing list. Modern surveying methods and LIDAR have also shown that certain peaks had a different elevation than previous estimates, while certain peaks, especially Mount Saint Helens, experienced a change in elevation.

== Climbers ==
Linsey Warren became the youngest person to complete the list at age 27, in 2014. Nathan Longhurst broke this record in 2021, at age 21, and in 2023 Andrew Okerlund broke the record at age 20.

Jeff Hashimoto and Langdon Ernest-Beck completed the list in the summer of 2023, traveling between summits exclusively on foot and via bicycle.

In 2021, Jason Hardrath set the record for the fastest known time to climb all 100 summits, in 51 days, beating the previous record of 410 days held by Eric Gilbertson.

As of July 2026, the list has been completed by 108 people.

== See also ==
- List of mountain lists
