= Goodell Creek =

- Location of the mouth of the Goodell Creek in Washington Goodell Creek (the United States)

Location
- Country: United States
- State: Washington
- County: Whatcom

Physical characteristics
- Source: North Cascades
  - coordinates: 48°48′12″N 121°18′25″W
- Mouth: Skagit River
  - coordinates: 48°40′20″N 121°15′52″W
  - elevation: 476 ft (145 m)

Goodell Creek is a tributary of the Skagit River in the U.S. state of Washington.

== Course ==
For most of its length Goodell Creek flows through North Cascades National Park. It originates in the Picket Range of the North Cascades. Its headwaters drain the south and west sides of the high peaks around Mount Fury and the eastern slope of Mount Crowder. The creek flows generally south collecting the waters of numerous tributaries, many of which are glacial fed. Crescent Creek drains the southwestern slopes of Mount Terror, then flows west to join Goodell Creek. Below the Crescent Creek confluence Goodell Creek turns to the southeast, collecting tributaries draining Mount Despair and Mount Triumph to the west. Terror Creek, which drains the southern slopes of Mount Terror, joins Goodell Creek from the north. In its last reach Goodell Creek passes between Trappers Peak to the west and Mount Ross to the east. The creek then enters Ross Lake National Recreation Area and empties into the Skagit River near Newhalem.

== See also ==
- List of rivers of Washington (state)
