= Easy Peak =

Mountain in Washington (state), United States

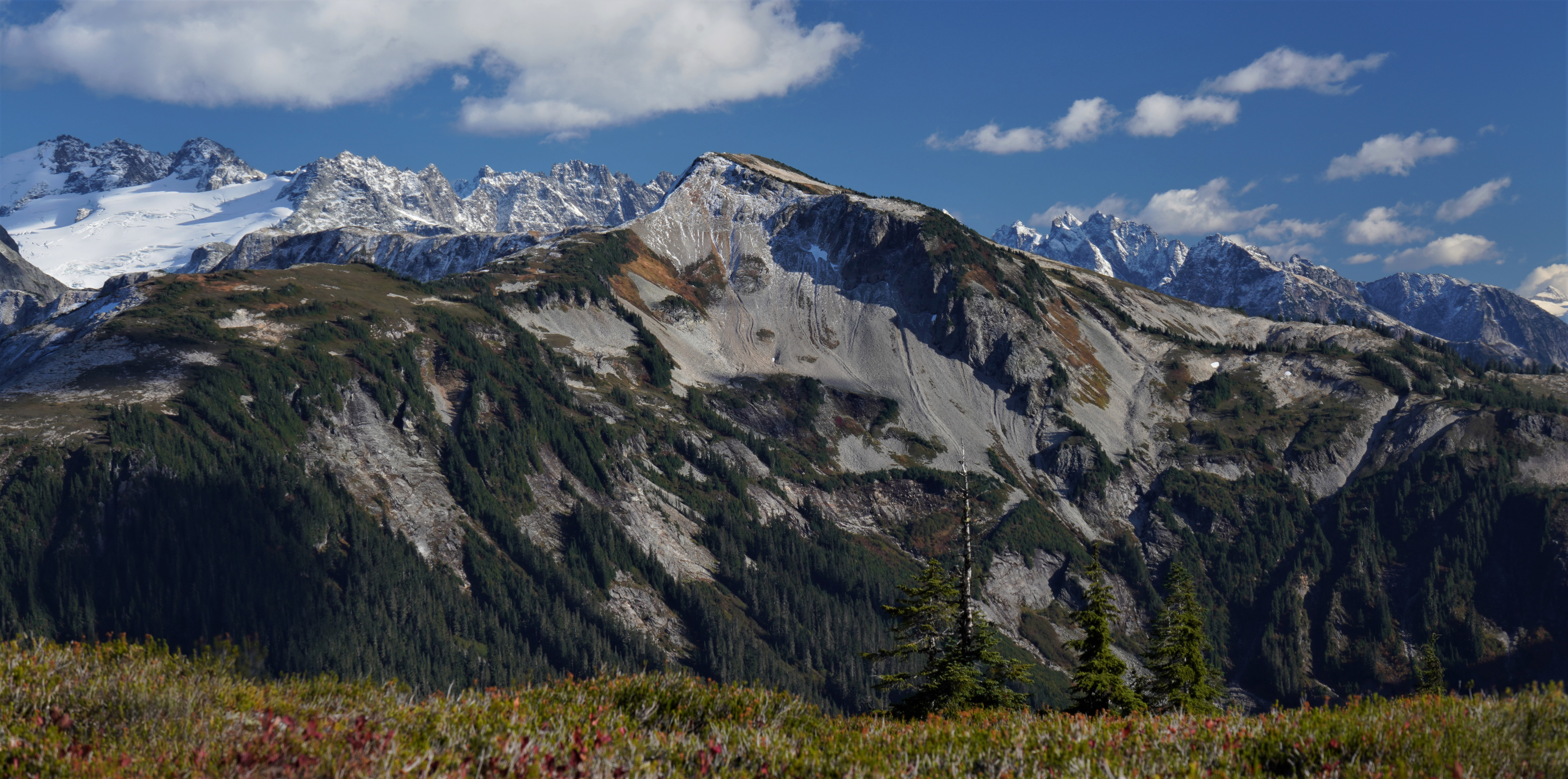
- Northwest aspect seen from Copper Ridge (Picket Range behind)

Highest point
- Elevation: 6,613 ft (2,016 m)
- Prominence: 373 ft (114 m)
- Parent peak: Mineral Mountain (6,800+ ft)
- Isolation: 1.98 mi (3.19 km)
- Coordinates: 48°51′34″N 121°25′13″W

Geography
- Location within Washington (state) Location within the United States
- Interactive map of Easy Peak
- Country: United States
- State: Washington
- County: Whatcom
- Protected area: North Cascades National Park
- Parent range: Cascade Range; North Cascades; Skagit Range
- Topo map: USGS Mount Blum

Climbing
- Easiest route: class 2 hiking

Easy Peak is a 6,613-foot (2,016-metre) mountain summit in the Skagit Range of the North Cascades, in Whatcom County of Washington state. Easy Peak is situated in North Cascades National Park, and is often climbed during the Easy Ridge approach to Mount Challenger and the remote northern Pickets. The nearest higher neighbor is Mineral Mountain, 2 mi (3.2 km) to the west, and Whatcom Peak is set 2.1 mi (3.4 km) to the east. Glacierets line the north slope of Easy Ridge between Easy Peak and Whatcom Peak. Precipitation runoff from this peak drains north into the Chilliwack River, or south into headwaters of the Baker River.

== Climate ==
Easy Peak is located in the marine west coast climate zone of western North America. Weather fronts originating in the Pacific Ocean travel northeast toward the Cascade Mountains. As fronts approach the North Cascades, they are forced upward by the peaks of the Cascade Range (orographic lift), causing them to drop their moisture in the form of rain or snowfall onto the Cascades. As a result, the west side of the North Cascades experiences high precipitation, especially during the winter months in the form of snowfall. Because of maritime influence, snow tends to be wet and heavy, resulting in high avalanche danger. During winter months, weather is usually cloudy, but due to high pressure systems over the Pacific Ocean that intensify during summer months, there is often little or no cloud cover during the summer. The months July through September offer the most favorable weather for viewing or climbing this peak.

== Geology ==
The North Cascades features some of the most rugged topography in the Cascade Range with craggy peaks, ridges, and deep glacial valleys. Geological events occurring many years ago created the diverse topography and drastic elevation changes over the Cascade Range leading to the various climate differences. These climate differences lead to vegetation variety defining the ecoregions in this area.

The history of the formation of the Cascade Mountains dates back millions of years ago to the late Eocene Epoch. With the North American Plate overriding the Pacific Plate, episodes of volcanic igneous activity persisted. In addition, small fragments of the oceanic and continental lithosphere called terranes created the North Cascades about 50 million years ago.

During the Pleistocene period dating back over two million years ago, glaciation advancing and retreating repeatedly scoured the landscape leaving deposits of rock debris. The U-shaped cross section of the river valleys is a result of recent glaciation. Uplift and faulting in combination with glaciation have been the dominant processes which have created the tall peaks and deep valleys of the North Cascades area.

== Gallery ==
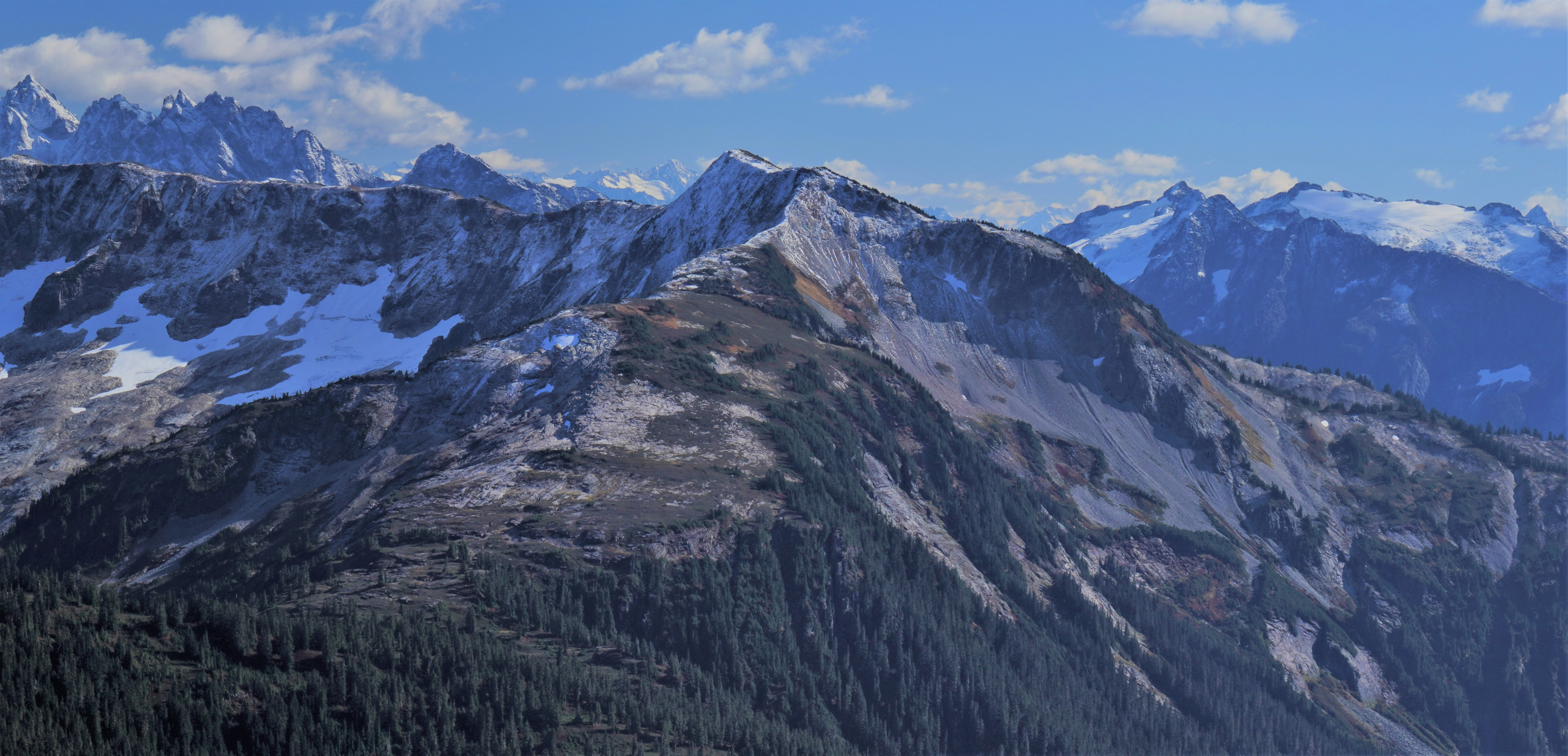
Easy Peak centered, from north

== See also ==
- Geography of the North Cascades
- Geology of the Pacific Northwest
