= Ghost Peak =

Mountain in Washington (state), United States

- Location within Washington (state) Location within the United States

Highest point
- Elevation: 8,000+ ft (2,440+ m)
- Prominence: 160 ft (50 m)
- Coordinates: 48°49′25″N 121°20′29″W

Geography
- Location: Whatcom County, Washington, U.S.
- Parent range: Picket Range, Cascade Range
- Topo map: USGS Mount Challenger

Climbing
- First ascent: July 17, 1970 Carla and Joan Firey, David Knudson, Peter Renz
- Easiest route: West Face Route Class 4

Ghost Peak (8,000+ ft (2,440+ m)) is in North Cascades National Park in the U.S. state of Washington. Located in the northern section of the park, Ghost Peak is in the Picket Range and is .30 mi (0.48 km) NNE of Phantom Peak and .20 mi (0.32 km) south of Crooked Thumb Peak.
