= Whatcom =

Whatcom may refer to Whatcom County, Washington, USA, or to several places and entities therein:

- Lake Whatcom
- Whatcom Creek drains Lake Whatcom into Bellingham Bay
- Whatcom Falls Park, Bellingham, containing the upper part of Whatcom Creek
- Whatcom Peak, North Cascades National Park
- Whatcom Glacier, North Cascades National Park
- Whatcom Trail, a gold prospectors' trail from Bellingham Bay to the upper Fraser Valley
- Whatcom County Council
- Whatcom Community College, Bellingham
- Whatcom Middle School, Bellingham School District

== See also ==
- New Whatcom, one of the towns in Whatcom County that merged to form Bellingham, Washington
- New Whatcom Normal School, former name of Western Washington University
