= Mount Crowder (Washington) =

Mountain in Washington (state), United States

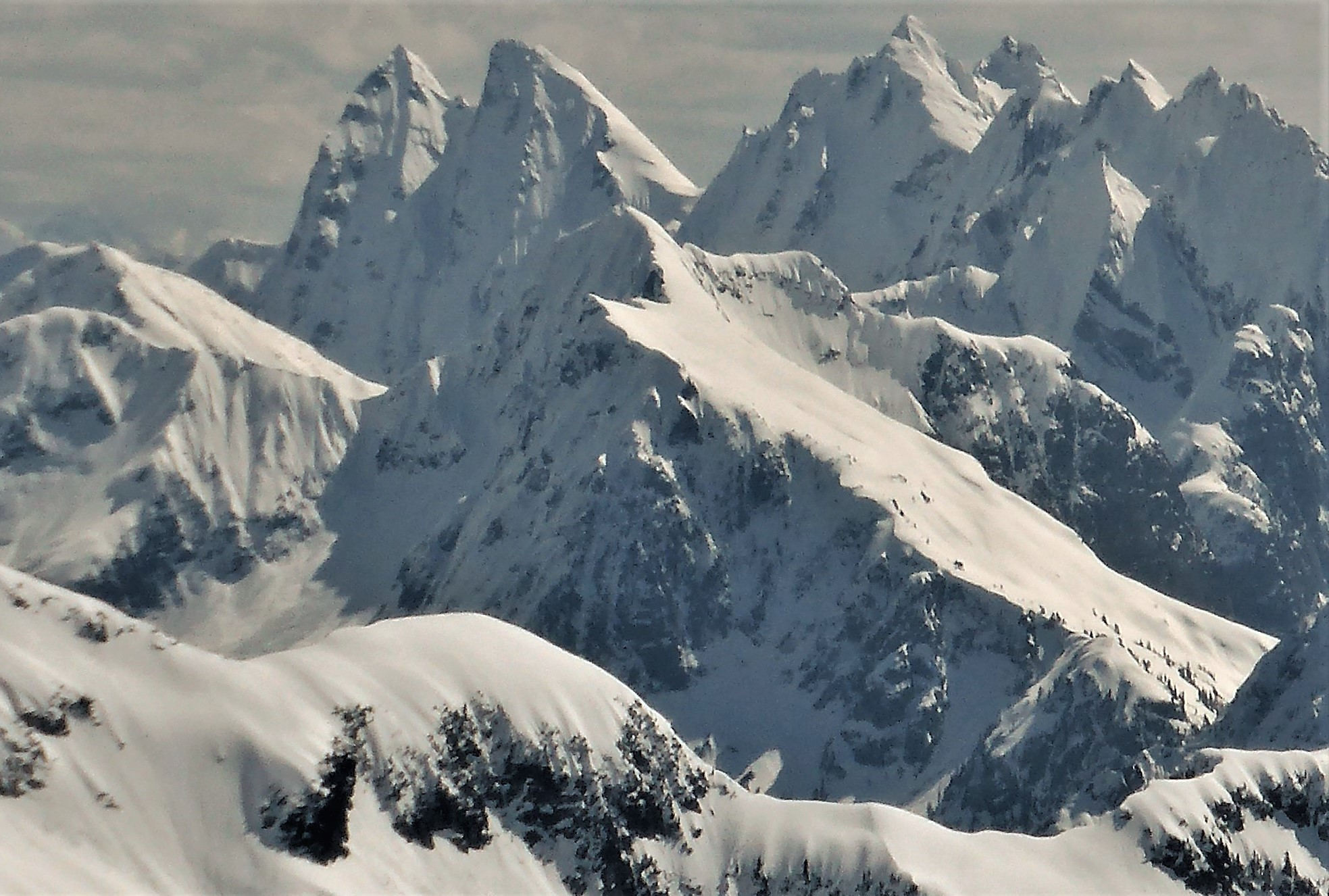
- Northwest aspect, centered

Highest point
- Elevation: 7,082 ft (2,159 m)
- Prominence: 1,042 ft (318 m)
- Parent peak: Phantom Peak (8,000+ ft)
- Isolation: 1.53 mi (2.46 km)
- Coordinates: 48°47′52″N 121°21′07″W

Naming
- Etymology: Dwight Farnsworth Crowder

Geography
- Location within Washington (state) Location within the United States
- Interactive map of Mount Crowder
- Country: United States
- State: Washington
- County: Whatcom
- Protected area: North Cascades National Park
- Parent range: Cascade Range; North Cascades; Picket Range
- Topo map: USGS Mount Challenger

Climbing
- First ascent: 1962

Mount Crowder is a remote 7,082-foot (2,159-metre) mountain summit in the Picket Range of the North Cascades, in Whatcom County of Washington state. Mount Crowder is situated in North Cascades National Park and Stephen Mather Wilderness. Neighbors include Mount Fury, 1.64 mi (2.64 km) to the northeast, and Twin Needles is set 2.3 mi (3.7 km) to the southeast. Precipitation runoff from this peak drains south into headwaters of Goodell Creek, and northwest into Picket Creek which is a tributary of the Baker River. Topographic relief is significant as the summit rises 4,300 feet (1,300 meters) above Goodell Creek in approximately one mile.

== History ==
The first ascent of the summit was made in 1962 by Cal Magnusson, Jack Ardussi, Don Mech, and Don Schmechel. At that time the peak was known as "Old Brownie."

In 1970, the name "Mount Crowder" was officially adopted by the U.S. Board on Geographic Names to honor and remember Dr. Dwight F. Crowder (1929–1970). He was a geologist, mountaineer, and conservationist who spent 12 years working for the United States Geological Survey in the North Cascades documenting the land and publishing significant scientific papers and books on its complex geology. He co-authored the 1965 book, "Routes and Rocks: Hiker's Guide to the North Cascades from Glacier Peak to Lake Chelan". He is credited with several first ascents in the North Cascades, such as South Spectacle Butte and Sitkum Spire.

Dr. Crowder died on April 8, 1970, the innocent victim of a senseless automobile accident in his home community of Portola Valley, California.

He is also the namesake of Mount Crowder in Antarctica, where he also had a work assignment.

== Climate ==
Mount Crowder is located in the marine west coast climate zone of western North America. Weather fronts originating in the Pacific Ocean travel east toward the Cascade Mountains. As fronts approach the North Cascades, they are forced upward by the peaks of the Cascade Range, causing them to drop their moisture in the form of rain or snowfall onto the Cascades. As a result, the west side of the North Cascades experiences high precipitation, especially during the winter months in the form of snowfall. Because of maritime influence, snow tends to be wet and heavy, resulting in high avalanche danger. This climate supports an unnamed glacier in the north cirque, and glacier remnants on the east slope. During winter months, weather is usually cloudy, but due to high pressure systems over the Pacific Ocean that intensify during summer months, there is often little or no cloud cover during the summer. The months July through September offer the most favorable weather for viewing or climbing this peak.

== Geology ==
The North Cascades features some of the most rugged topography in the Cascade Range with craggy peaks, ridges, and deep glacial valleys. Geological events occurring many years ago created the diverse topography and drastic elevation changes over the Cascade Range leading to the various climate differences. These climate differences lead to vegetation variety defining the ecoregions in this area.

The history of the formation of the Cascade Mountains dates back millions of years ago to the late Eocene Epoch. With the North American Plate overriding the Pacific Plate, episodes of volcanic igneous activity persisted. In addition, small fragments of the oceanic and continental lithosphere called terranes created the North Cascades about 50 million years ago.

During the Pleistocene period dating back over two million years ago, glaciation advancing and retreating repeatedly scoured the landscape leaving deposits of rock debris. The U-shaped cross section of the river valleys is a result of recent glaciation. Uplift and faulting in combination with glaciation have been the dominant processes which have created the tall peaks and deep valleys of the North Cascades area.

== Gallery ==
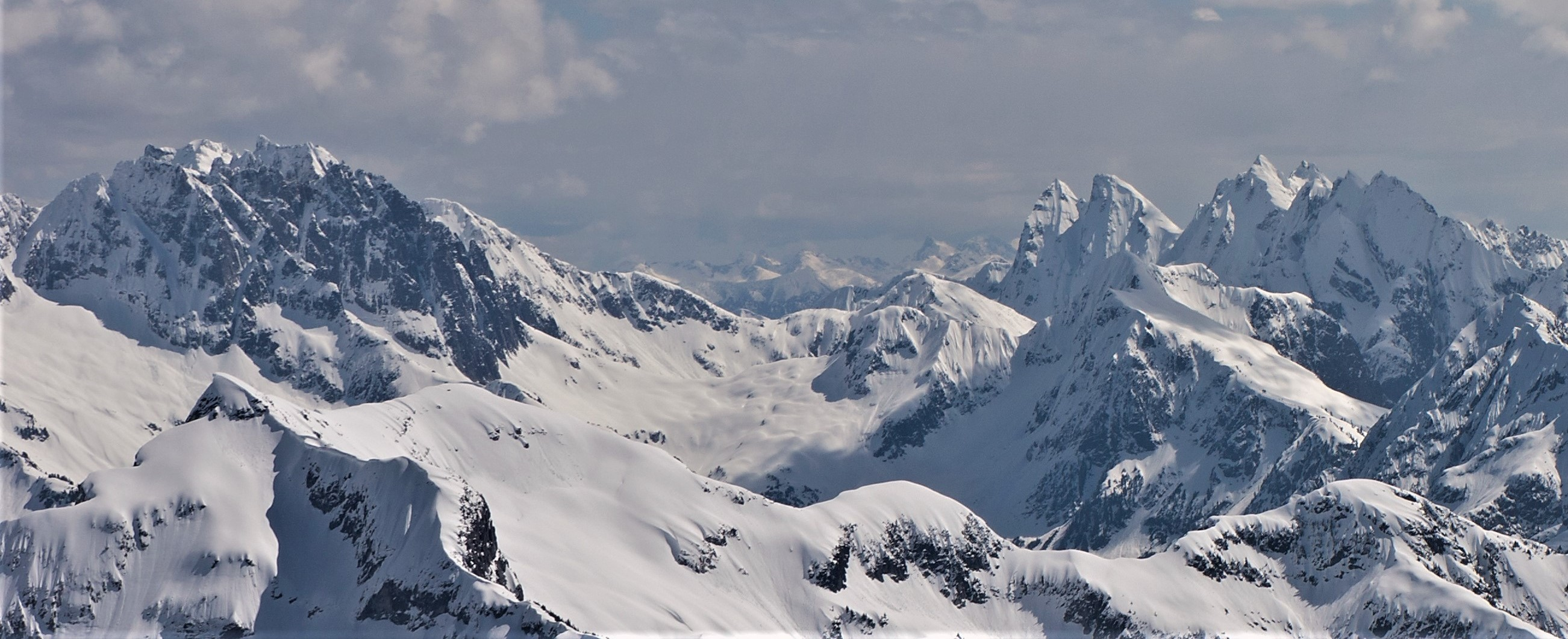
Phantom Peak to left, Mount Crowder to right with McMillan Spires and Mount Terror behind it. View is from Ruth Mountain looking east-southeast.

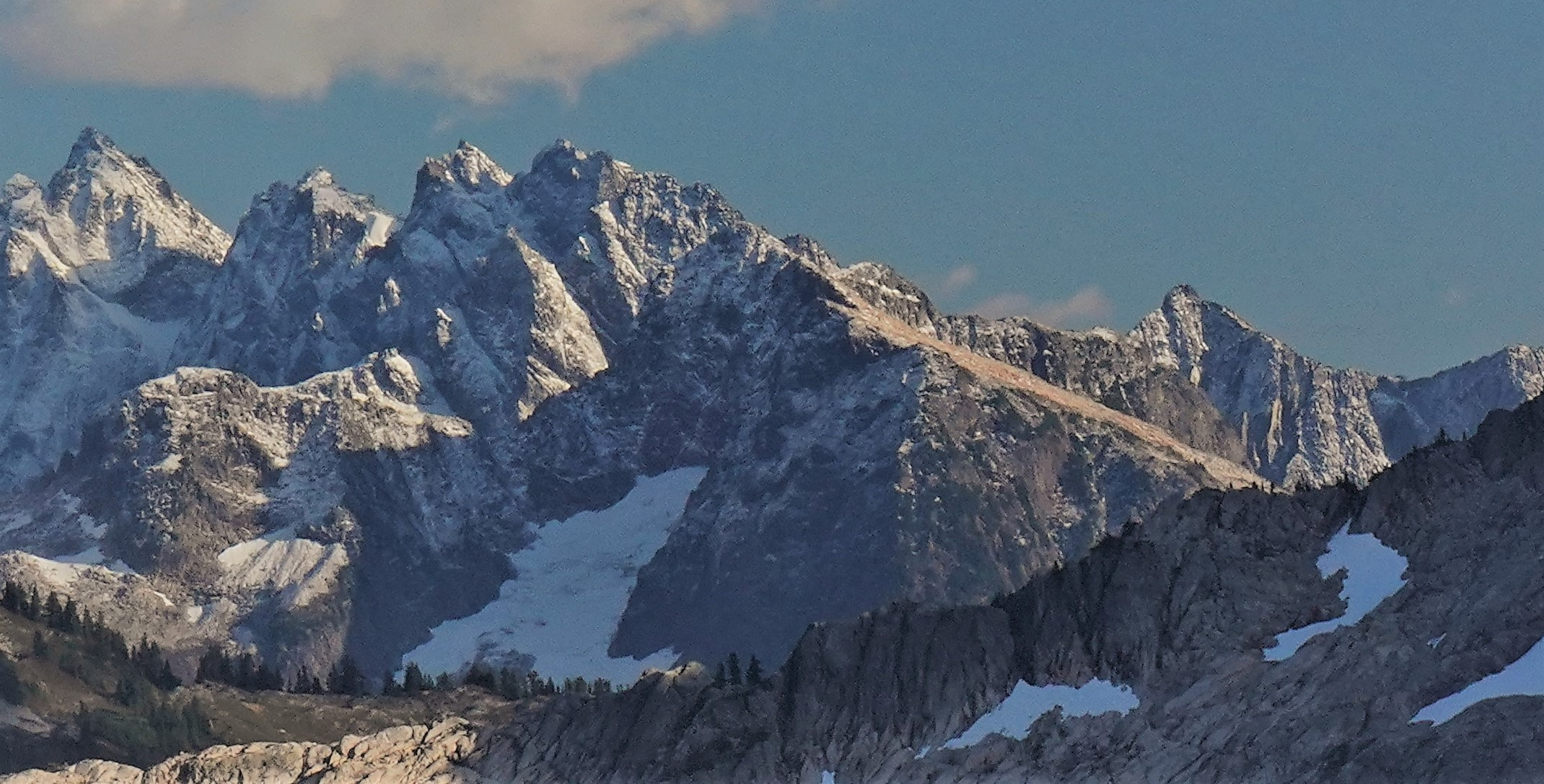
Mount Crowder (centered, shaded, with glacier), Crescent Creek Spires (behind Crowder), Mount Terror (upper left). View from Copper Ridge.

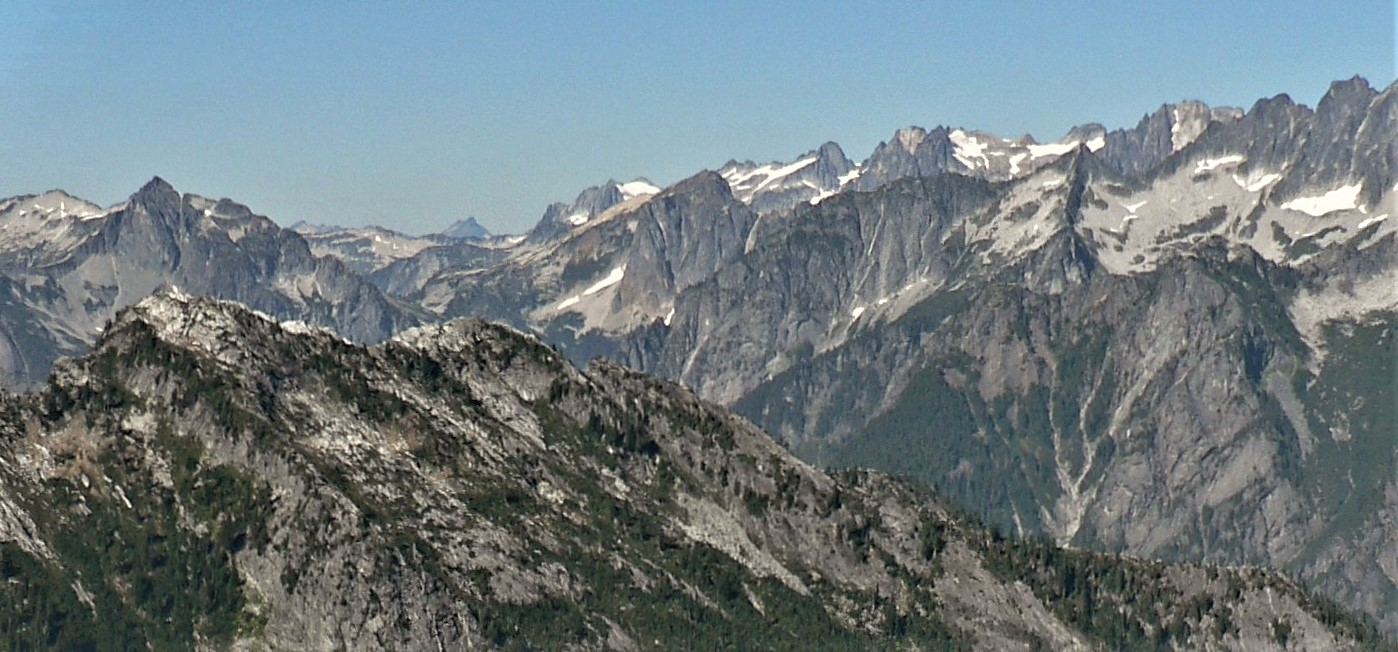
South aspect of Mount Crowder (centered, angular shape) seen from Trappers Peak

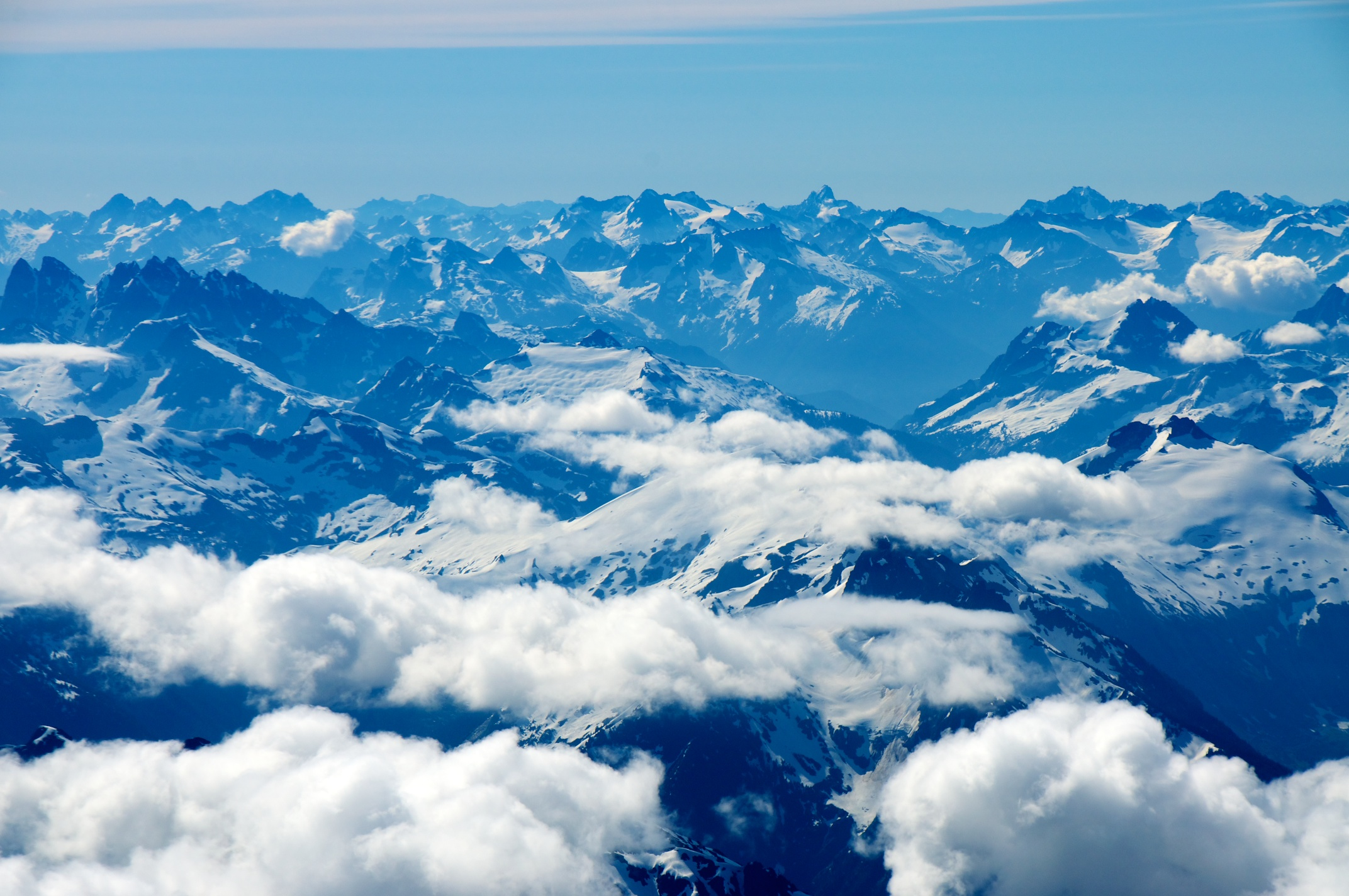
Aerial view of North Cascades with Mt. Crowder along left edge (see file annotation)

== See also ==
- Geography of the North Cascades
- Geology of the Pacific Northwest
