= Luna Lake =

Luna Lake may refer to:

- Luna Lake (Arizona)
- Luna Lake (Washington)
