= Eric Gilbertson (climber) =

American amateur mountaineer and surveyor (born 1986)

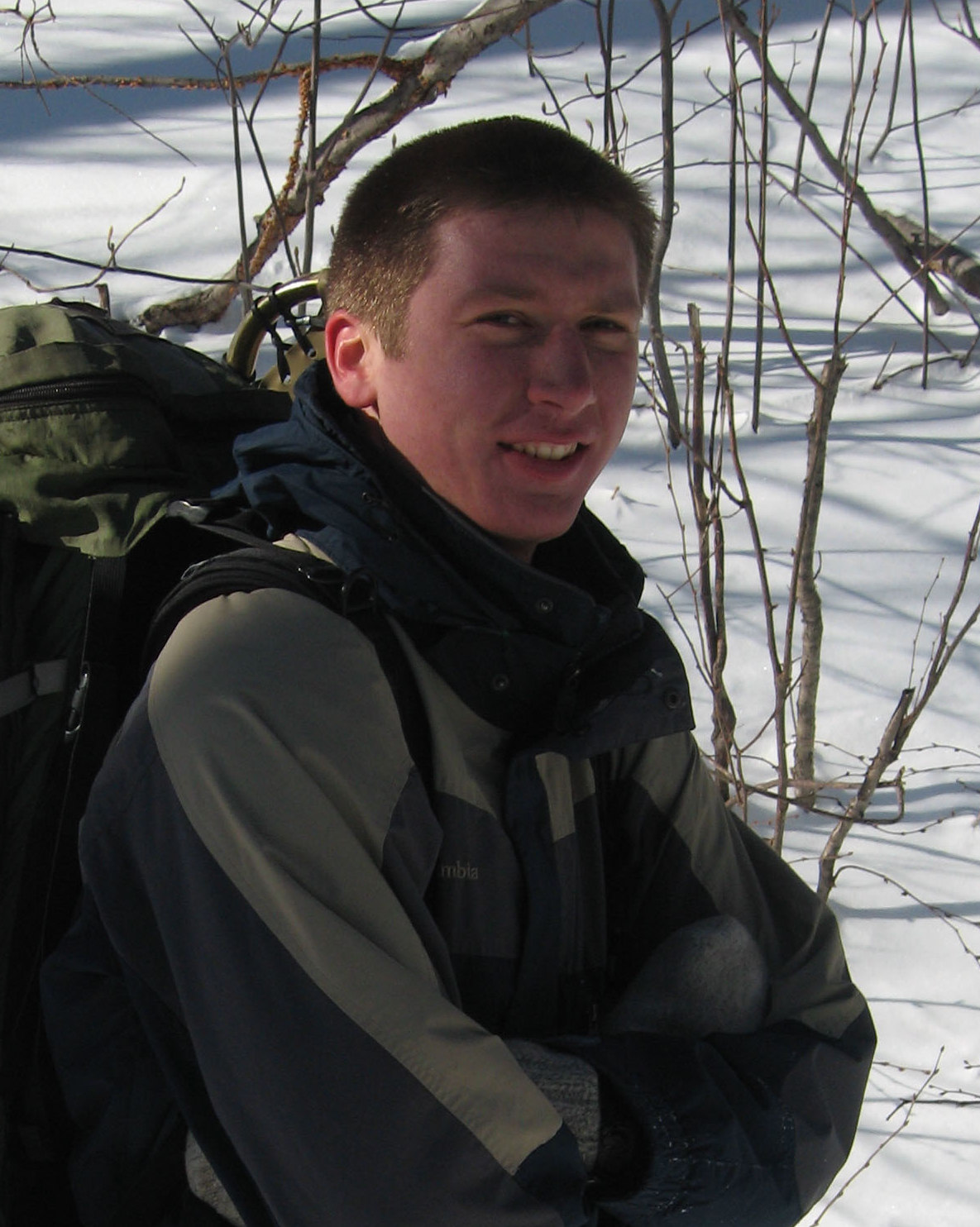
- Gilbertson in 2009
- Born: 1986 (age 39–40); Berea, Kentucky, U.S.
- Occupation: Associate professor

Academic background
- Education: Massachusetts Institute of Technology, BS, 2008; MS, 2010; PhD, 2014
- Thesis: Describing functions for information channels subject to packet loss and quantization (2014)
- Doctoral advisor: Franz S. Hover

Academic work
- Discipline: Mechanical engineering; Physical geography; Climate science
- Institutions: Seattle University; Skolkovo Institute of Science and Technology; North Seattle College
- Sports career

Climbing career
- Type of climber: Peakbagging; Alpine climbing; Traditional climbing
- First ascents: Alpomish (4668m, 7p 5.8, 2023)
- Website: www.countryhighpoints.com

Eric Gilbertson (born 1986) is an American mountaineer and associate professor of mechanical engineering at Seattle University. He is known for his accomplishments in climbing and his work as an amateur mountain surveyor. His surveying activities have resulted in a re-evaluation about the actual elevation and location of several mountain summits.

== Early life and academic career ==
Gilbertson was born a twin in Berea, Kentucky, a mountainous region on the Cumberland Plateau where he grew up. He said that his passion for mountaineering started with trips with their parents to the Great Smoky Mountains National Park. Gilbertson and his brother Matthew graduated from Berea Community High School in 2004. They then moved to Cambridge, Massachusetts, to attend the Massachusetts Institute of Technology (MIT).

While at MIT, Gilbertson was an intern at the NASA Jet Propulsion Laboratory, where he co-designed a Mars lander to study the climate. He received his Bachelor of Science in mechanical engineering (ME) in 2008.

He and his brother spent the subsequent summer bikepacking southward from Prudhoe Bay, Alaska, before returning to MIT where Gilbertson completed his Master of Science in 2010, and a PhD in 2014, both in ME. His graduate work involved autonomous underwater vehicles and acoustic physics in collaboration with the Office of Naval Research.

After he graduated Gilbertson taught at the Skolkovo Institute of Science and Technology, which operated through a partnership with MIT. In 2016, he relocated to Seattle, where he taught mathematics at North Seattle College. As of November 2025, he is an associate professor of ME at Seattle University, where he has taught since at least 2018.

== Mountaineering ==
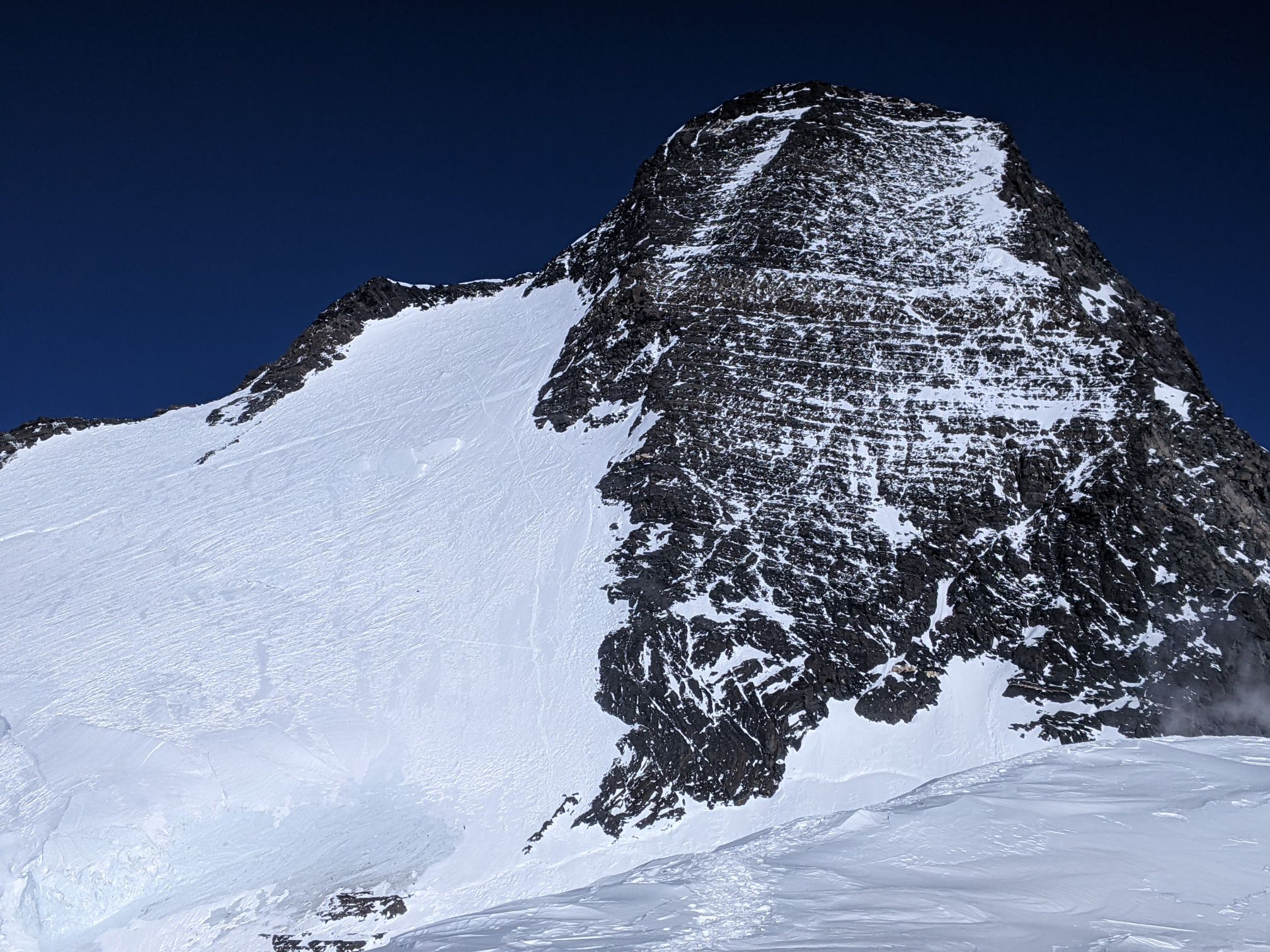
Gilbertson's photo of Pik Kommunizma, one of the Snow Leopard peaks and the highest mountain in Tajikistan

Gilbertson was involved with the MIT Outing Club as a mountaineering guide.

He and Matthew climbed the high points of all 50 states in the United States, a project that took them five years. In 2016, they applied for a Guinness World Record as they believed they were the first people to highpoint every peak in every North American country. They say they are on a mission to climb the highest elevation point of every country in the world. Their first country high point was Denali in May 2010. Gilbertson said that as of October 2025, he had climbed 144 of 196 country high points.

Gilbertson completed the fastest known time (FKT) for the 100 tallest mountains in Colorado, Wyoming's thirteeners, and the tallest 27 peaks in Montana, the Rocky Mountains Slam, in 2020 until 2023, when Jason Hardrath, an Oregon elementary school teacher, beat his record. He completed the FKT for the Bulger List, the hundred tallest mountains in Washington state, in 2018. This record was also beaten by Hardrath in 2021.

In 2023 Gilbertson became the third American to achieve the Snow Leopard award by summiting all five peaks above 7,000 metres (23,000 ft) in the former Soviet Union. Gilbertson climbed K2 without supplemental oxygen in 2022. He has done the same with other Himalayan peaks. Although he is mostly a peakbagger, Gilbertson has also completed some technical first ascents, including Alpomish, within the Gissar Range with Andreas Frydensberg on August 23, 2023.

On multiple occasions, Gilbertson has lost climbing partners in mountaineering accidents. In September 2020, the 26-year old Bulger list finisher Jake Robinson died after falling into a hidden crevasse near Kololo Peaks. In August 2025, professional photographer and mountain guide Ross James Wallette died in a fall near the summit of East Fury.

== Surveying ==
Gilbertson uses professional surveying equipment such as GNSS receivers to precisely find the elevation of mountain summits. In 2018, Gilbertson climbed Jabal Sawda, which was previously believed to be the high point of Saudi Arabia, but determined that it was shorter than Jabal Ferwa. The Saudi Climbing Federation subsequently changed the official high point. He and his brother also ascertained the high points of Togo, Guinea-Bissau, Ivory Coast, and Uzbekistan.

In 2024 he was awarded a grant by the American Alpine Club to survey the Cascade Range in Washington state to determine how Washington's mountains were being impacted by climate change. He found the summit of Mount Saint Helens has been eroding at a rate of 4 inches (10 cm) annually since 1989.

Gilbertson surveyed five historical icecap summits from August through October 2024 to track ice melt over time. He first reported the findings on Mount Rainier in 2024. Larry Signani, who first surveyed the mountain for the Army Corps of Engineers, told The Seattle Times that the results were credible. Gilbertson, Scott Hotaling, a watershed specialist at Utah State University, and collaborators concluded that four of the five—Mount Rainier, Eldorado Peak, East Fury, and Liberty Cap—had lost around 20–30 feet (6–9 m) of ice. Colfax Peak had maintained its elevation and it, along with Liberty Cap, remained the only ones that still had ice on the summit year-round. Mauri Pelto, a glaciologist for the North Cascade Glacier Climate Project, has recorded similar ice losses at 30 glaciers in the state since 1990.

The findings, published in 2025, indicated that the ice melt is attributed to climate change and an increase of temperature of nearly 5.5 °F (3.1 °C) since the mid-twentieth century, with most of this increase happening since 1990. Gilbertson also determined that Mount Rainier's summit had also moved from the Columbia Crest to a point on the southwest crater rim that melts down to bare rock at 14,399.6 feet (4,389.0 m) over the summer. Scott Beason, a geologist at Mount Rainier National Park, said that Gilbertson's findings were consistent with the park's glacial monitoring program. Terry Wildy, the park's chief of interpretation, expressed concern for the methods Gilbertson used, but said that the team requested the raw field data from the survey for evaluation and falsification. The Land Surveyors' Association of Washington's 2010 survey showed no significant change to the summit elevation, despite Rainier losing half of its ice between 1896 and 2023. They scheduled a survey for 2026.

On October 5, 2025, Gilbertson surveyed Crestone and East Crestone peaks in Colorado, determining that East Crestone is 14,299.3 feet (4,358.4 m) high, and around 3.6 inches (9.1 cm) taller than Crestone, which was previously considered the true summit of the Crestone cluster. Gilbertson's measurements found the opposite of another survey using LiDAR. He found that LiDAR has limitations that make its measurements inaccurate for certain features, like small, sharp summits. He showed that where LiDAR indicated there was a spire on East Crestone's summit, there wasn't any such feature. As to the discrepancy between their heights, he said that "The simplest explanation is they just hadn't been measured accurately enough until now to know which was taller".

== Select publications ==
- Gilbertson, Eric; Abatzoglou, John T.; Stanchak, Kathryn E.; Hotaling, Scott (December 31, 2025). "Rapid contemporary shrinking and loss of ice-capped summits in the western United States". Arctic, Antarctic, and Alpine Research. 57 (1) 2572898. Bibcode:2025AAAR...5772898G. doi:10.1080/15230430.2025.2572898. ISSN 1523-0430.
- Gilbertson, Eric; Gilbertson, Matthew (November 24, 2025). "Determination of new national highpoints of five African and Asian countries—Saudi Arabia, Uzbekistan, Gambia, Guinea-Bissau, and Togo". Progress in Physical Geography: Earth and Environment 03091333251401102. arXiv:2511.20676. doi:10.1177/03091333251401102. ISSN 0309-1333.
- Gilbertson, Eric; Hensley, Richard; Kirmse, Andrew; Bretherton, Kyle; Stanchak, Kathryn (November 26, 2025). "LiDAR accuracy on North American mountain summits". Progress in Physical Geography: Earth and Environment 03091333251401361. arXiv:2511.12341. doi:10.1177/03091333251401361. ISSN 0309-1333.
