= Luna Lake (Washington) =

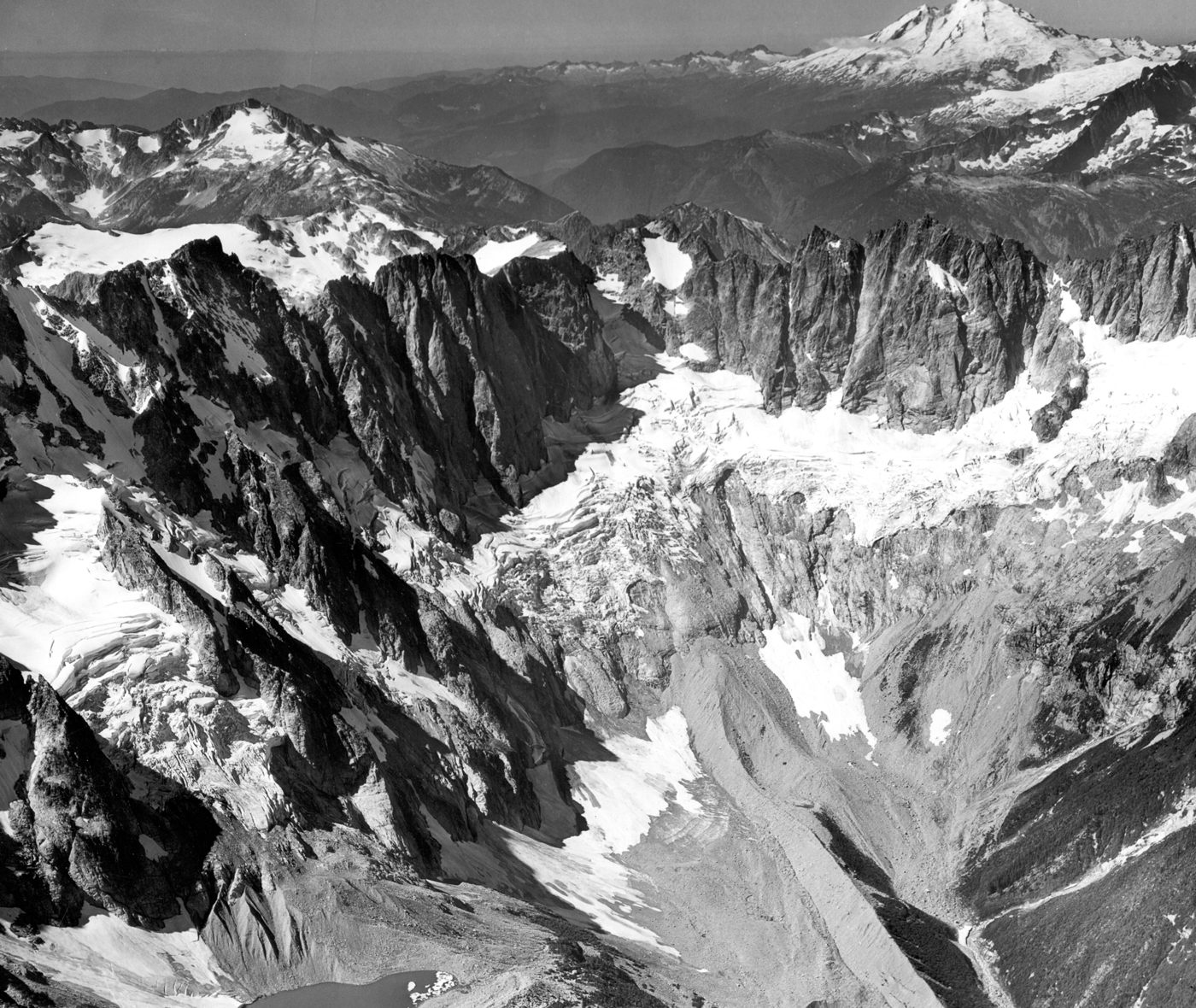
- Luna Lake partially imaged at bottom left in this 1960 image

- Location within Washington (state) Location within the United States
- Location: North Cascades National Park, Whatcom County, Washington, United States
- Coordinates: 48°49′26″N 121°17′45″W
- Type: Glacial Lake
- Primary outflows: Luna Creek
- Basin countries: United States
- Max. length: 500 yd (460 m)
- Max. width: 250 yd (230 m)
- Surface elevation: 4,902 ft (1,494 m)

Luna Lake is located in North Cascades National Park, in the U. S. state of Washington. Situated 1 mi (1.6 km) southwest of Luna Peak which is the tallest mountain in the rugged Picket Range, Luna Lake is a proglacial lake impounded by the moraine of a retreated glacier.
