= Poltergeist Pinnacle =

Mountain in Washington (state), United States

- Location within Washington (state) Location within the United States

Highest point
- Elevation: 8,200+ ft (2,500+ m)
- Prominence: 40 ft (10 m)
- Coordinates: 48°49′25″N 121°20′29″W

Geography
- Location: Whatcom County, Washington, U.S.
- Parent range: Cascade Range
- Topo map: USGS Mount Challenger

Poltergeist Pinnacle (8,200+ ft (2,500+ m)) is in North Cascades National Park in the U.S. state of Washington. Located in the northern section of the park, Poltergeist Pinnacle is in the Picket Range and is .09 mi (0.14 km) south of Mount Challenger and for all basic purposes, is one of the main pinnacles of Mount Challenger.
