= Whatcom Glacier =

Glacier in Washington, United States

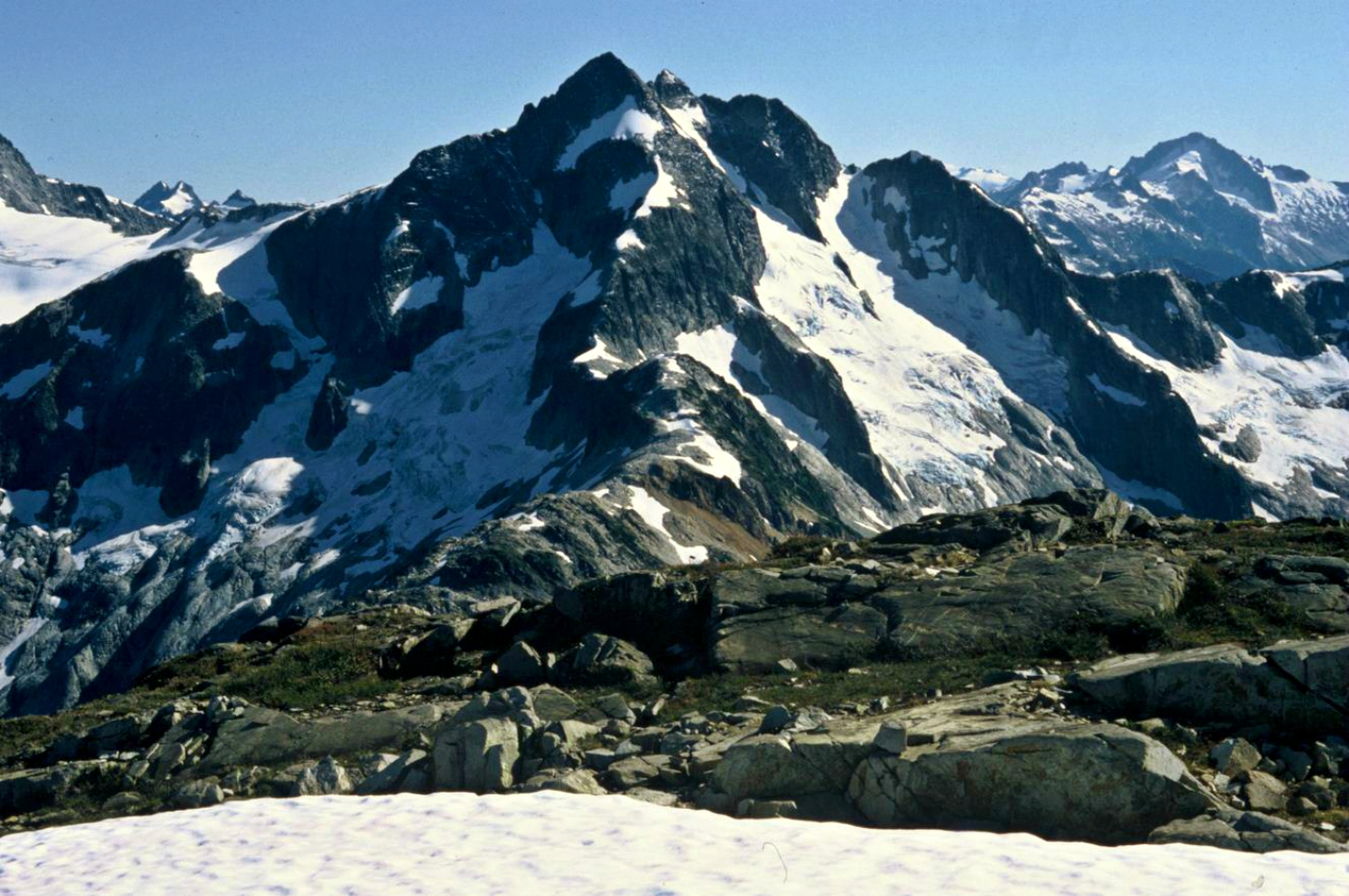

- Location within Washington (state)
- Type: Mountain glacier
- Location: Skagit County, Washington, U.S.
- Coordinates: 48°51′52″N 121°22′02″W
- Length: .35 mi (0.56 km)
- Terminus: Barren rock/icefall
- Status: Retreating

Whatcom Glacier is in North Cascades National Park in the U.S. state of Washington, in a cirque to the northeast of Whatcom Peak. Whatcom Glacier is approximately .50 mi (0.80 km) north of Challenger Glacier.

== See also ==
- List of glaciers in the United States
