= Himmelhorn (Washington) =

Mountain in Washington (state), United States

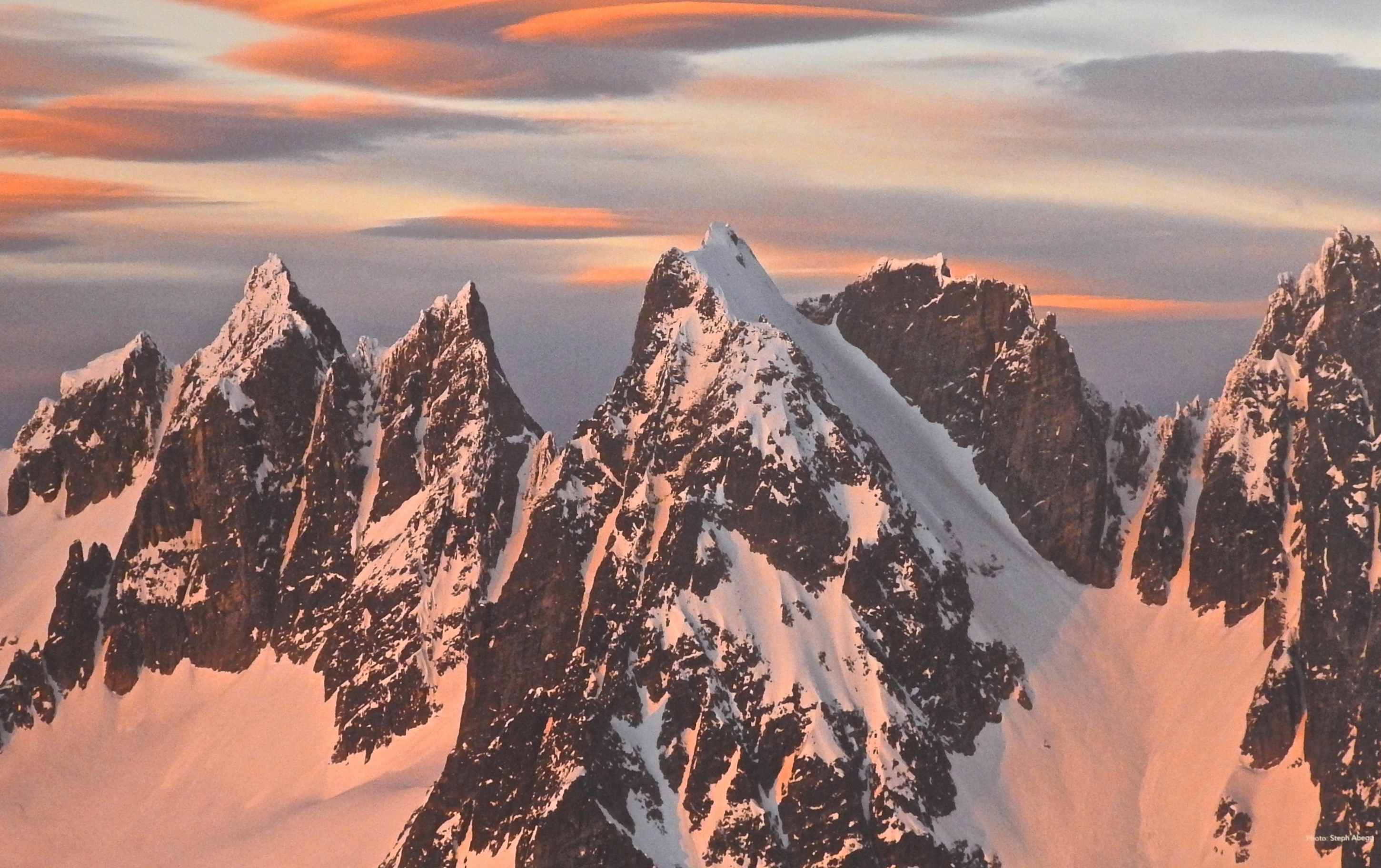
- Himmelhorn centered (Twin Needles left)

Highest point
- Elevation: 7,880 ft (2,400 m)
- Prominence: 120 ft (37 m)
- Parent peak: Twin Needles (7,936 ft)
- Isolation: 0.11 mi (0.18 km)
- Coordinates: 48°46′35″N 121°18′53″W

Geography
- Location within Washington (state) Location within the United States
- Country: United States
- State: Washington
- County: Whatcom
- Protected area: North Cascades National Park
- Parent range: Picket Range; Cascade Range
- Topo map: USGS Mount Challenger

Geology
- Rock type: Skagit Gneiss

Climbing
- First ascent: 1961
- Easiest route: Climbing YDS 5

Himmelhorn is a 7,880+ ft (2,400+ m) mountain summit located in the remote and rugged Picket Range within North Cascades National Park in the state of Washington. The peak lies 0.7 mi (1.1 km) west of Mount Terror and the small Mustard Glacier lies on its northern slope. The first ascent of Himmelhorn was made on September 8, 1961, by Ed Cooper, Glen Denny, Joan and Joe Firey, and George Whitmore. Originally called Himmelgeisterhorn, Himmelhorn means Horn of the Sky Spirit.

== Climate ==
Himmelhorn is located in the marine west coast climate zone of western North America. Weather fronts originating in the Pacific Ocean travel northeast toward the Cascade Mountains. As fronts approach the North Cascades, they are forced upward by the peaks of the Cascade Range (orographic lift), causing them to drop their moisture in the form of rain or snowfall onto the Cascades. As a result, the west side of the North Cascades experiences high precipitation, especially during the winter months in the form of snowfall. Because of maritime influence, snow tends to be wet and heavy, resulting in high avalanche danger. During winter months, weather is usually cloudy, but due to high pressure systems over the Pacific Ocean that intensify during summer months, there is often little or no cloud cover during the summer.

== Geology ==
The North Cascades features some of the most rugged topography in the Cascade Range with craggy peaks, spires, ridges, and deep glacial valleys. Geological events occurring many years ago created the diverse topography and drastic elevation changes over the Cascade Range leading to the various climate differences.

The history of the formation of the Cascade Mountains dates back millions of years ago to the late Eocene Epoch. With the North American Plate overriding the Pacific Plate, episodes of volcanic igneous activity persisted. In addition, small fragments of the oceanic and continental lithosphere called terranes created the North Cascades about 50 million years ago.

During the Pleistocene period dating back over two million years ago, glaciation advancing and retreating repeatedly scoured the landscape leaving deposits of rock debris. The U-shaped cross section of the river valleys is a result of recent glaciation. Uplift and faulting in combination with glaciation have been the dominant processes which have created the tall peaks and deep valleys of the North Cascades area.
