= Phantom Peak =

Mountain in Washington (state), United States

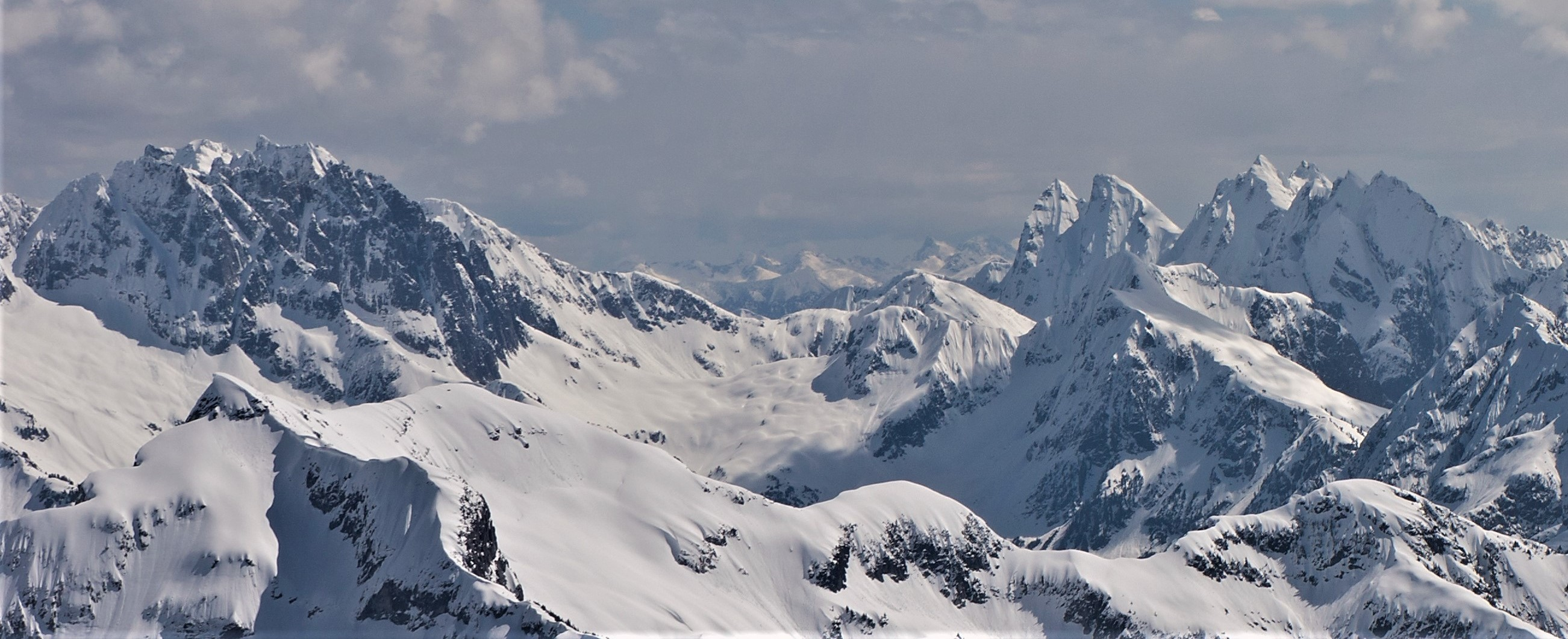
- Phantom Peak to left, Mount Crowder to right with McMillan Spires and Mount Terror behind it (viewed from Ruth Mountain looking east-southeast)

Highest point
- Elevation: 8,000+ ft (2,440+ m)
- Prominence: 360 ft (110 m)
- Coordinates: 48°49′08″N 121°20′33″W

Geography
- Location within Washington (state) Location within the United States
- Location: Whatcom County, Washington, U.S.
- Parent range: Cascade Range
- Topo map: USGS Mount Challenger

Climbing
- First ascent: 1940 Fred Beckey
- Easiest route: Southwest Route Class 4

Phantom Peak (8,000+ ft (2,440+ m)) is in North Cascades National Park in the U.S. state of Washington. Located in the northern section of the park, Phantom Peak is in the Picket Range and is 1 mi (1.6 km) northwest of Mount Fury, 1.5 mi (2.4 km) north of Mount Crowder, and .50 mi (0.80 km) south of Crooked Thumb Peak.
