= Dark Peak (Washington) =

Mountain in Washington, United States

Coordinates: 48°15′17″N 120°52′54″W

Dark Peak is one of the top 100 highest mountains in Washington State, located in Chelan County near Bonanza Peak. It is typically climbed via Stehekin and the Dark Glacier.
