= Blackcap Mountain =

- Location within Washington (state)
- Interactive map of Blackcap Mountain

Highest point
- Elevation: 8,397 ft (2,559 m)
- Coordinates: 48°48′15″N 120°32′33″W

Geography
- Location: Pasayten Wilderness, Washington State, US

Blackcap Mountain is an 8,397 feet (2,559 m) summit in Washington State, located in the north-central part of the state in the Pasayten Wilderness. It is a technically easy climb but requires a 38 miles (61 km) roundtrip hike with cumulative elevation gain of 12,700 feet (3,900 m).
