= Challenger Glacier (Washington) =

Glacier in the United States

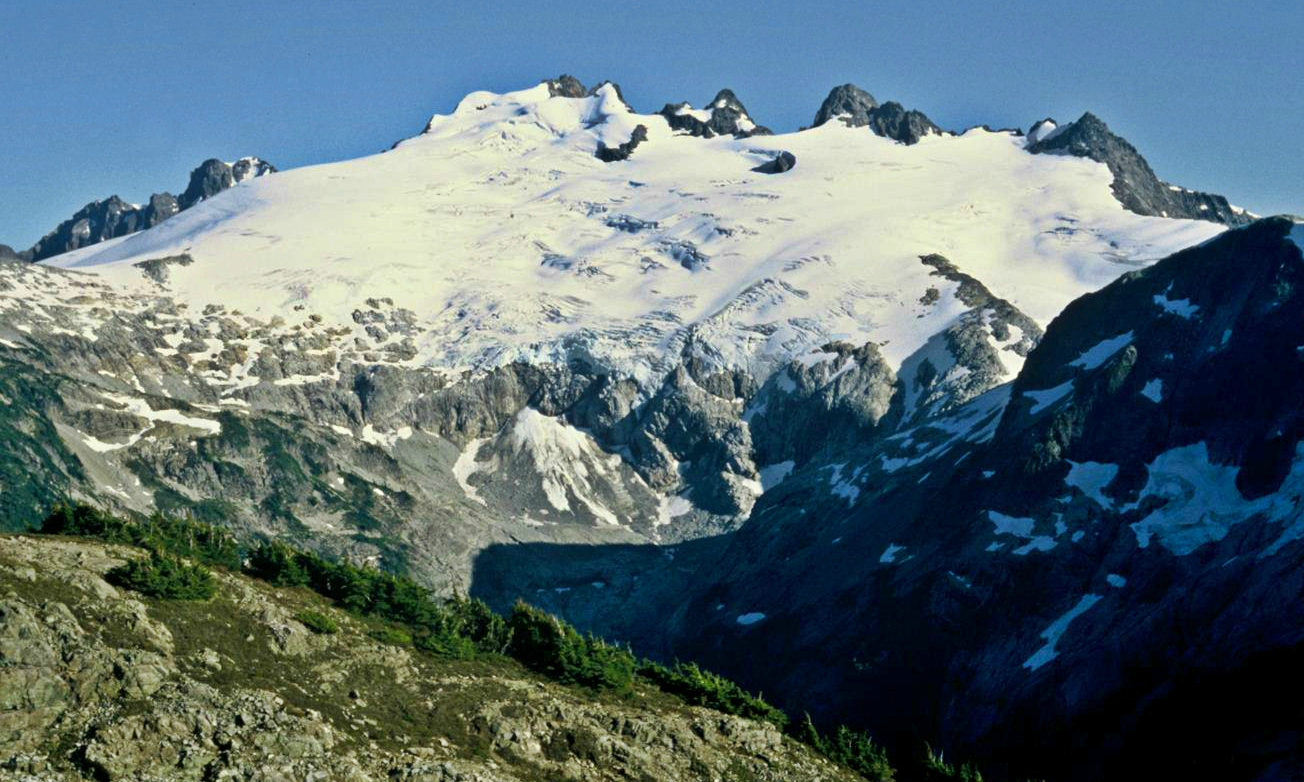
- Challenger Glacier on the north slope of Mount Challenger

- Location within Washington (state)
- Type: Alpine glacier
- Location: Whatcom County, Washington, U.S.
- Coordinates: 48°50′44″N 121°20′50″W
- Length: 1.5 mi (2.4 km)
- Terminus: Barren rock/icefall/proglacial lake
- Status: Retreating

Challenger Glacier is in North Cascades National Park in the U.S. state of Washington and is on the north slopes of Mount Challenger. Challenger Glacier descends from 8,000 to 5,000 ft (2,400 to 1,500 m). Over 2 mi (3.2 km) wide, Challenger Glacier descends along a wide terminus with heavy crevassing and numerous icefalls, with a tongue of the glacier in the north descending to a proglacial lake. The ascent up Challenger Glacier is one of the most common routes to the summit of Mount Challenger.

== See also ==
- List of glaciers in the United States
