= Luna Peak (Washington) =

Mountain in Washington, United States

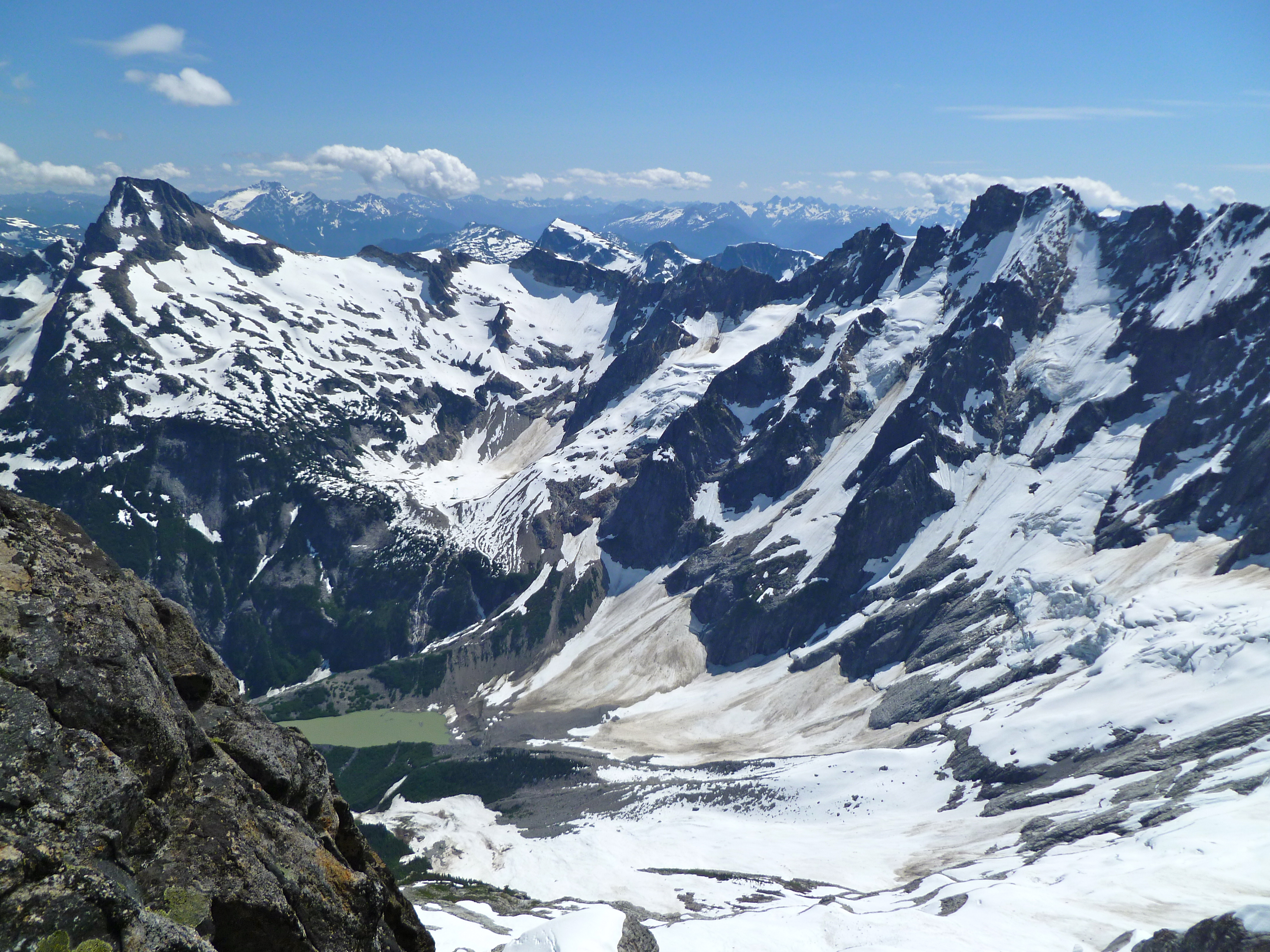
- Luna Peak far left and Mount Fury at far right

Highest point
- Elevation: 8,311 ft (2,533 m) NGVD 29
- Prominence: 3,105 ft (946 m)
- Coordinates: 48°49′50″N 121°16′23″W

Geography
- Location within Washington (state) Location within the United States
- Interactive map of Luna Peak
- Location: North Cascades National Park, Whatcom County, Washington, U.S.
- Parent range: Picket Range, North Cascades
- Topo map: USGS Mount Challenger

Climbing
- First ascent: September 1938, by Bill Cox and Will F. Thompson
- Easiest route: scramble, (class 3/4)

Luna Peak is the highest mountain in the Picket Range, an extremely rugged subrange of the North Cascades in the American state of Washington. It is located within North Cascades National Park. It is notable for its large local relief and isolated position on a far-flung eastern ridge of the Pickets. For example, it rises over 6,560 ft (2,000 m) in 1.8 mi (2.9 km) above McMillan Creek to the south.

Luna Peak was first climbed in early September 1938, by Bill Cox and Will F. Thompson. The standard route is the Southwest Ridge, approached from Ross Lake and Big Beaver Creek. It requires strenuous off-trail hiking including bushwhacking and tricky route-finding, but offers the promise of solitude, as the peak is rarely climbed. The final climb to the true summit involves exposed scrambling on loose rock, and some parties will want a rope (Class 3/4).

The north and east faces of Luna Peak are steep and dramatic, but are not popular with mountaineers. Fred Beckey stated, "the peak lacks the compelling appeal of attractive alpine climbing problems."

== Climate ==
Luna Peak is located in the marine west coast climate zone of western North America. Most weather fronts originate in the Pacific Ocean, and travel northeast toward the Cascade Mountains. As fronts approach the North Cascades, they are forced upward by the peaks of the Cascade Range, causing them to drop their moisture in the form of rain or snowfall onto the Cascades (Orographic lift). As a result, the west side of the North Cascades experiences high precipitation, especially during the winter months in the form of snowfall. During winter months, weather is usually cloudy, but, due to high pressure systems over the Pacific Ocean that intensify during summer months, there is often little or no cloud cover during the summer. Because of maritime influence, snow tends to be wet and heavy, resulting in high avalanche danger.

== Geology ==
The North Cascades features some of the most rugged topography in the Cascade Range with craggy peaks, spires, ridges, and deep glacial valleys. Geological events occurring many years ago created the diverse topography and drastic elevation changes over the Cascade Range leading to the various climate differences.

The history of the formation of the Cascade Mountains dates back millions of years ago to the late Eocene Epoch. With the North American Plate overriding the Pacific Plate, episodes of volcanic igneous activity persisted. In addition, small fragments of the oceanic and continental lithosphere called terranes created the North Cascades about 50 million years ago.

During the Pleistocene period dating back over two million years ago, glaciation advancing and retreating repeatedly scoured and shaped the landscape. A small glacial remnant lies on the south slope of Dorado Needle, whereas the northern slope maintains the extensive McAllister Glacier. The U-shaped cross section of the river valleys are a result of recent glaciation. Uplift and faulting in combination with glaciation have been the dominant processes which have created the tall peaks and deep valleys of the North Cascades area.
