= Picket Range =

Mountain range in Washington, United States

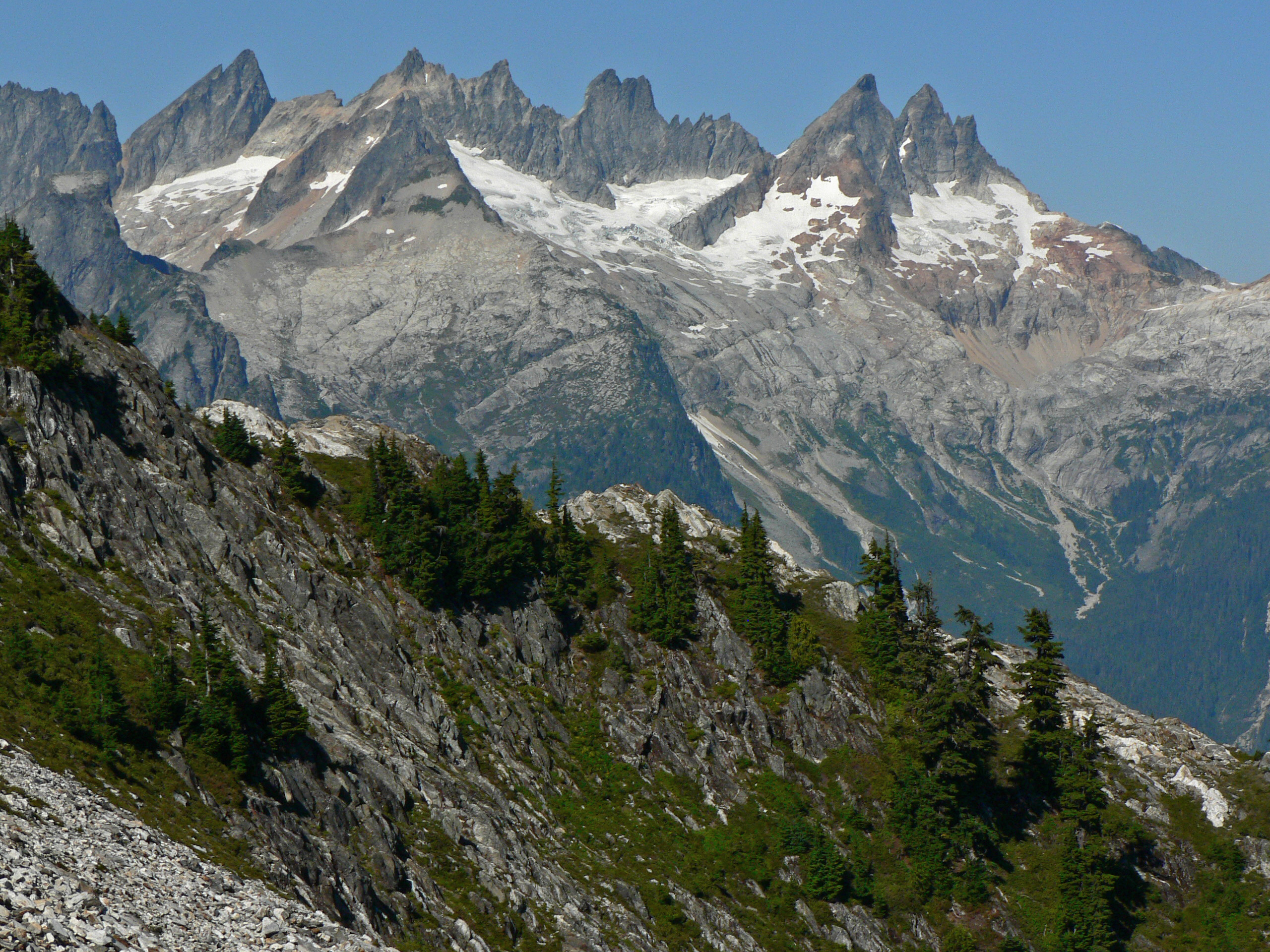
- Mount Terror (left skyline), Inspiration Peak (center) and McMillan Spires (right center) from the south

Highest point
- Peak: Luna Peak
- Elevation: 8,311 ft (2,533 m)
- Coordinates: 48°49′51″N 121°16′24″W

Geography
- Country: United States
- Region: Washington
- Parent range: North Cascades

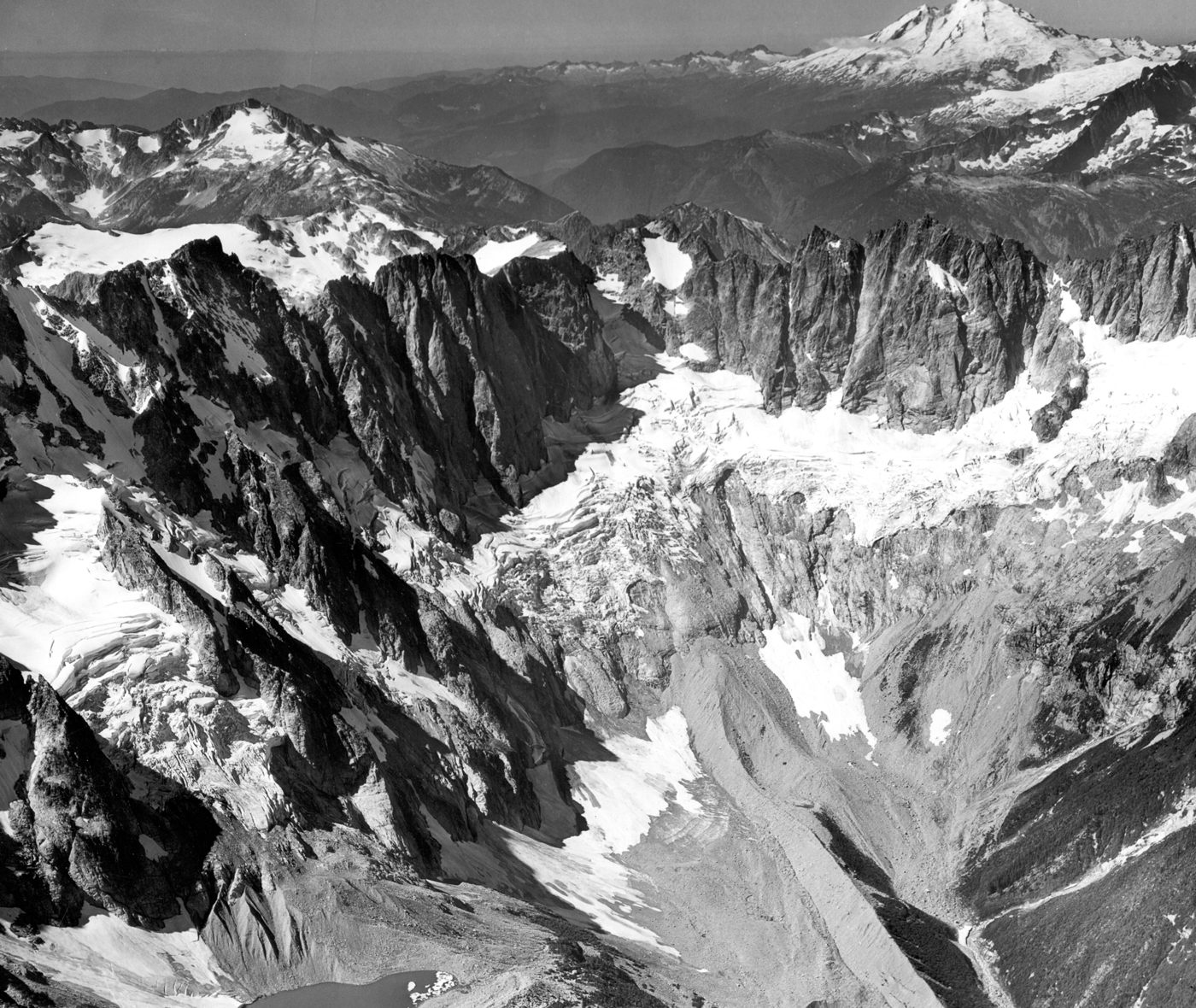
Picket Range at the head of Luna Creek, looking west (1960)

The Picket Range is a small, extremely rugged subrange of the North Cascades in the northwestern part of the American state of Washington. It is entirely contained within North Cascades National Park. It is about 6 miles (9.7 km) long, running northwest–southeast, and lies north of the Skagit River, west of Ross Lake, and east of Mounts Baker and Shuksan. There are at least 21 peaks in the range over 7,500 ft (2,300 m) high.

Swedish American Lage Wernstedt of the U.S. Forest Service mapped the Picket Range in the 1920s and named it for its resemblance to a picket fence (and not for George Pickett). Wernstedt was also apparently responsible for the names of the main peaks, including Mt. Challenger, Fury, Terror, and Phantom. These names first appeared on maps in 1931.

There are few trails in the Picket Range, and any excursion there has a strong wilderness character. Most of the access points are characterized as steep brush thick valleys, with little open terrain. Many of the peaks are challenging rock climbs. The rock is biotite gneiss, formed by metamorphism of sedimentary and volcanic rocks about 100 million years ago.

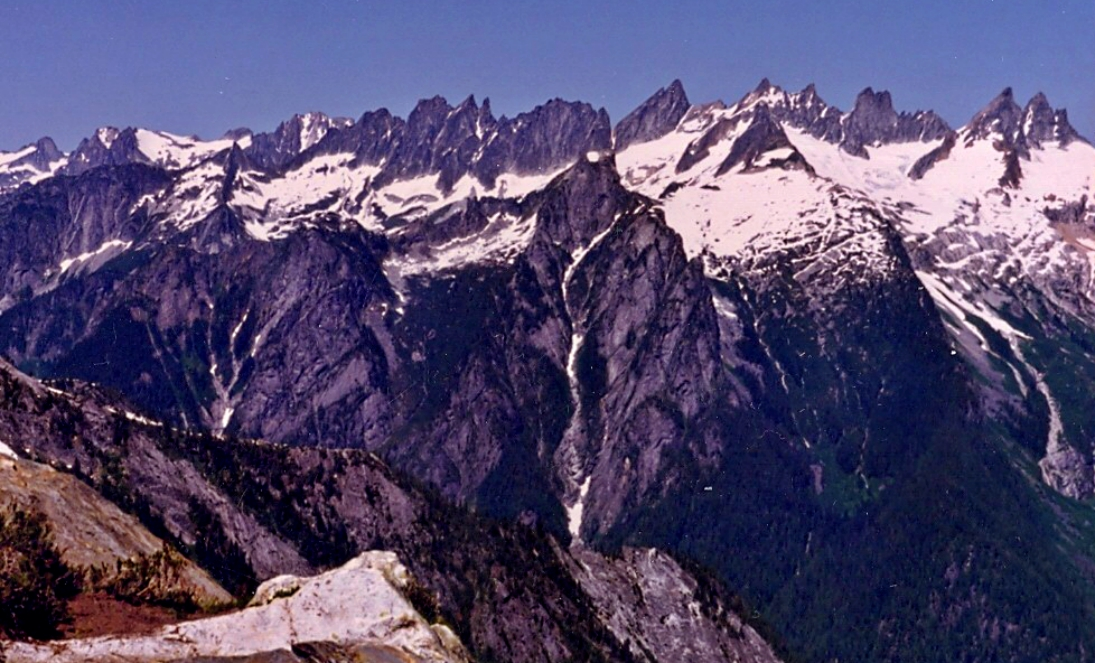
Picket Range from Trappers Peak 1990

== Notable Peaks of the Picket Range ==
Mountain	Height		First ascent
Mountain	(ft)	(m)	First ascent
Luna Peak	8,311	2,533	1938
Mount Fury	8,301	2,530	1938
Mount Challenger	8,207	2,501	1936
Poltergeist Pinnacle	8,200	2,499	2004
Mount Terror	8,151	2,484	1932
Crooked Thumb Peak	8,129	2,478	1940
McMillan Spire	8,004	2,440	1940
Phantom Peak	8,004	2,440	1940
Mount Degenhardt	8,000	2,438	1931
Ghost Peak	8,000	2,438	1970
Swiss Peak	7,993	2,436	1968
The Pyramid	7,960	2,426	1951
Twin Needles	7,936	2,419	1932
Inspiration Peak	7,880	2,402	1940
Spectre Peak	7,880	2,402	1980
Himmelhorn	7,880	2,402	1961
The Rake	7,840	2,390	1951
Little Mac Spire	7,680	2,341	1969
Ottohorn	7,640	2,329	1961
Whatcom Peak	7,574	2,309	1936
Frenzel Spitz	7,440	2,268	1961
Mount Crowder	7,082	2,159	1962
West Peak	7,000	2,134	1932
The Chopping Block	6,819	2,078	1932

== See also ==
- List of mountain ranges in Washington
