= Mount Challenger (Washington) =

Mountain in Washington (state), United States

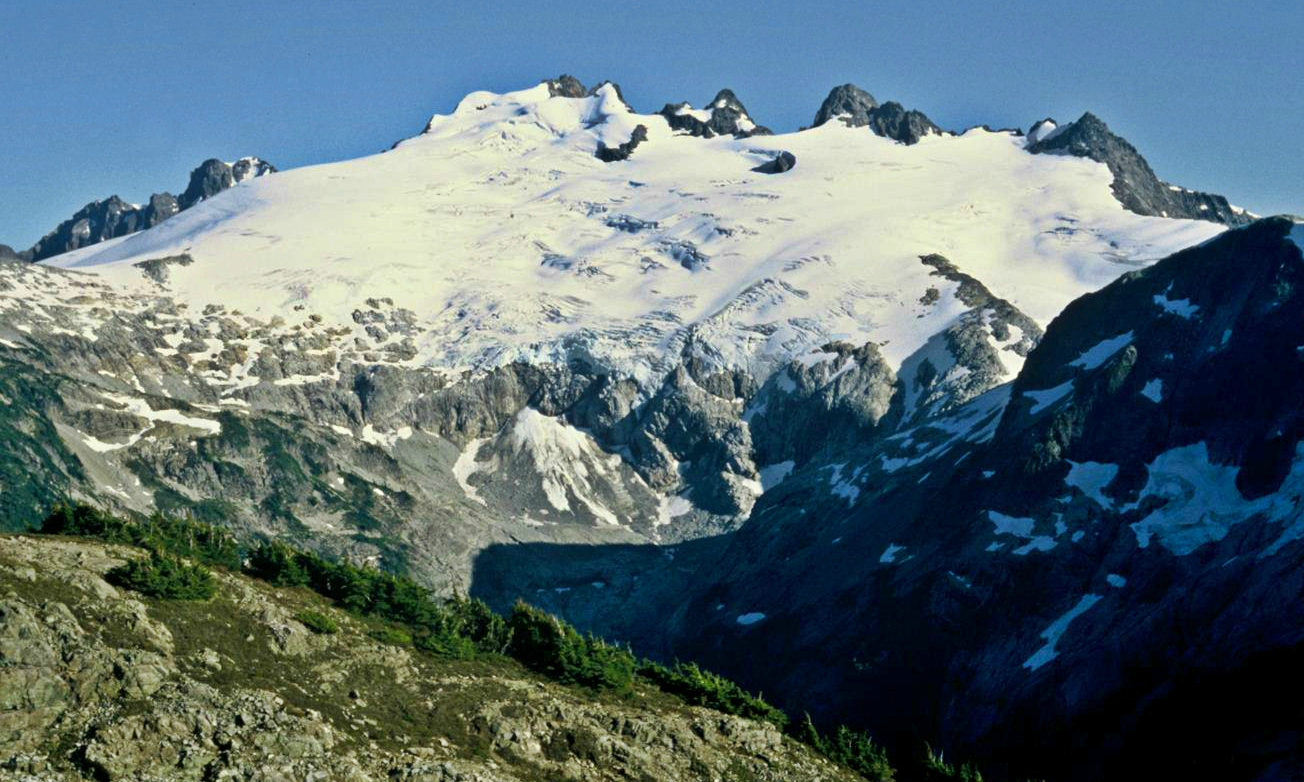

Highest point
- Elevation: 8,207 ft (2,501 m)
- Prominence: 567 ft (173 m)
- Coordinates: 48°50′08″N 121°20′32″W

Geography
- Location within Washington (state) Location within the United States
- Location: Whatcom County, Washington, U.S.
- Parent range: Cascade Range
- Topo map: USGS Mount Challenger

Climbing
- Easiest route: class 4

Mount Challenger (8,207 feet (2,501 m)) is in North Cascades National Park in the U.S. state of Washington. A difficult peak to approach due to its isolation, one of the most common routes to the summit involves ascending the Challenger Glacier on the north slopes of the peak. Mount Challenger is one of the taller peaks of the Picket Range.

== Climate ==
Mount Challenger is located in the marine west coast climate zone of western North America. Most weather fronts originate in the Pacific Ocean, and travel northeast toward the Cascade Mountains. As fronts approach the North Cascades, they are forced upward by the peaks of the Cascade Range (Orographic lift), causing them to drop their moisture in the form of rain or snowfall onto the Cascades. As a result, the west side of the North Cascades experiences high precipitation, especially during the winter months in the form of snowfall. Due to its temperate climate and proximity to the Pacific Ocean, areas west of the Cascade Crest very rarely experience temperatures below 0 °F (−18 °C) or above 80 °F (27 °C). During winter months, weather is usually cloudy, but, due to high pressure systems over the Pacific Ocean that intensify during summer months, there is often little or no cloud cover during the summer. Because of maritime influence, snow tends to be wet and heavy, resulting in high avalanche danger.
