= KOHD =

Television station in Bend, Oregon

- Bend, Oregon; United States
- Channels: Digital: 18 (UHF); Virtual: 18
- Branding: KOHD; Central Oregon Daily

Programming
- Affiliations: 18.1: ABC; 18.2: CBS

Ownership
- Owner: BendBroadband; (Telephone and Data Systems); (TDS Broadcasting LLC)
- Sister stations: KBNZ-LD

History
- First air date: September 9, 2006
- Former channel numbers: Digital: 51 (UHF, 2006–2015); Virtual: 51 (2006–2019)
- Call sign meaning: Oregon's High Desert; -or-; Oregon High Definition

Technical information
- Licensing authority: FCC
- Facility ID: 166534
- ERP: 84.1 kW
- HAAT: 221 m (725 ft)
- Transmitter coordinates: 44°4′40.6″N 121°19′56.9″W
- Translator(s): K09YE-D La Pine

Links
- Public license information: Public file; LMS
- Website: www.centraloregondaily.com/kohd-abc/

KOHD (channel 18) is a television station in Bend, Oregon, United States, serving as the ABC affiliate for Central Oregon. It is owned by local cable company BendBroadband alongside low-power CBS affiliate KBNZ-LD (channel 7). The two stations share studios on Sherman Road in Bend; KOHD's transmitter is located in the city on Awbrey Butte west of US 97.

== History ==
The station was started by Chambers Communications and signed on as a digital-only station on September 9, 2006; it never broadcast a full-power analog signal prior to the June 12, 2009, analog shutdown for broadcast television stations. KOHD is the first primary digital station to carry a major network affiliation. The station replaced co-owned KEZI in Eugene as well as KATU from Portland on area cable systems.

For its first year on-the-air, KOHD simulcasted weeknight newscasts from KEZI while building their own local news department. Chambers Communications completed their 11,000-square-foot (1,000 m^{2}) facility at Brinson Business Park on the north side of Bend in August 2007. KOHD originally had an in-city translator, K53JV (channel 53), from a transmitter on Awbrey Butte. It had a construction permit to air a low-power digital signal on channel 18 from the same location. The FCC canceled the translator's license on February 15, 2013.

On July 26, 2013, Chambers sold KOHD to Zolo Media, owners of KBNZ-LD, the CBS affiliate. Zolo is a division of BendBroadband. BendBroadband in turn announced on May 1, 2014, that the company, including Zolo Media, would be purchased by TDS for $261 million, a company mainly involved in local telephone and broadband services.

On June 24, 2015, KOHD-DT relocated the station's primary over-the-air broadcast channel, from channel 51 to channel 18. The FCC licensed the station to operate on channel 18 on July 6, 2015.

=== Dispute with Dish Network ===
On December 10, 2010, KOHD announced that owner Chambers Communications (which also owned KEZI in Eugene, KDRV in Medford, and KDKF in Klamath Falls) and Dish Network could not come to a long-term agreement to keep the station on the air in the Medford market and were in danger of losing local ABC programming as a result. Viewers were encouraged to read a special Q&A page regarding this matter. Despite their best efforts, their previous agreement expired on December 15 and the stations were removed from the Dish Network local line-ups. Chambers and Dish finally came to an agreement to resume service and as of December 30, 2010, the stations returned on Dish Network.

== News operation ==
On September 26, 2007, KOHD began airing local newscasts (which were broadcast in high definition) from 5:30 to 7 a.m. as well as 5, 6, 6:30, and 11 p.m. Weekend newscasts were canceled in July 2009, replaced by House on Saturday nights at 11 and Inside Edition Weekend on Sunday nights at 5 and 11. Following the March 5, 2010, 11 p.m. show, KOHD's news operation was scaled back to three reporters and fourteen staffers were laid off. Long form newscasts were canceled with news and weather updates replacing them. In September 2010, half-hour newscasts returned to KOHD at 6 and 11 p.m. Monday-Friday. In September 2011, KOHD began simulcasting all of KEZI's weekday newscasts (except the 5 a.m. hour of the morning newscast) as well as the 6 p.m. and 11 p.m. on weekends.

As of August 2015, KOHD has stopped simulcasting KEZI's newscasts. Most time slots have since been replaced by syndicated programming, though KOHD has only one locally produced program left: myWindow, seen weeknights at 6 p.m. (half-hour). Before the discontinuation of simulcasts, KOHD was last simulcasting the weekday 6 a.m. hour, the weeknight 5 and 11 p.m. newscasts from KEZI, as well as weekends at 5 and 11, plus Saturday newscasts at 6 and 6:30 p.m.

In April 2016, Zolo Media announced the debut of a local news program to air on both KOHD and KBNZ starting on May 2, 2016, called Central Oregon Daily. KOHD currently airs newscasts weeknights at 5 and 11 p.m., Saturdays at 11 p.m., and Sundays at 9 a.m. and 11 p.m.

== Subchannels ==
The station's digital signal is multiplexed:

Subchannels of KOHD
Channel	Res.	Short name	Programming
18.1	1080i	KOHD-DT	ABC
18.2	1080i	KBNZ LD	CBS (KBNZ-LD)

Simulcast of subchannels of another station
