= Cascade Volcanic Arc calderas =

The Cascade Volcanic Arc is a chain of volcanoes stretching from southern British Columbia down to northern California. Within the arc there is a variety of stratovolcanoes like Mount Rainier and broad shield volcanoes like Medicine Lake. But calderas are very rare in the Cascades, with very few forming over the 39 million year lifespan of the arc.

The few eruptions that do form calderas rarely make it into the VEI 7 range, staying confined to the VEI 6 range in most cases. The only volcanoes known to have produced eruptions within the VEI 7 range are Crater Lake, the Mt. Baker Volcanic Field, and the Lassen Volcanic Center.

All of the exceptionally large caldera-forming eruptions within the cascades erupted silica-rich magmas, with the three VEI 7s erupting mainly rhyodacite and rhyolite.

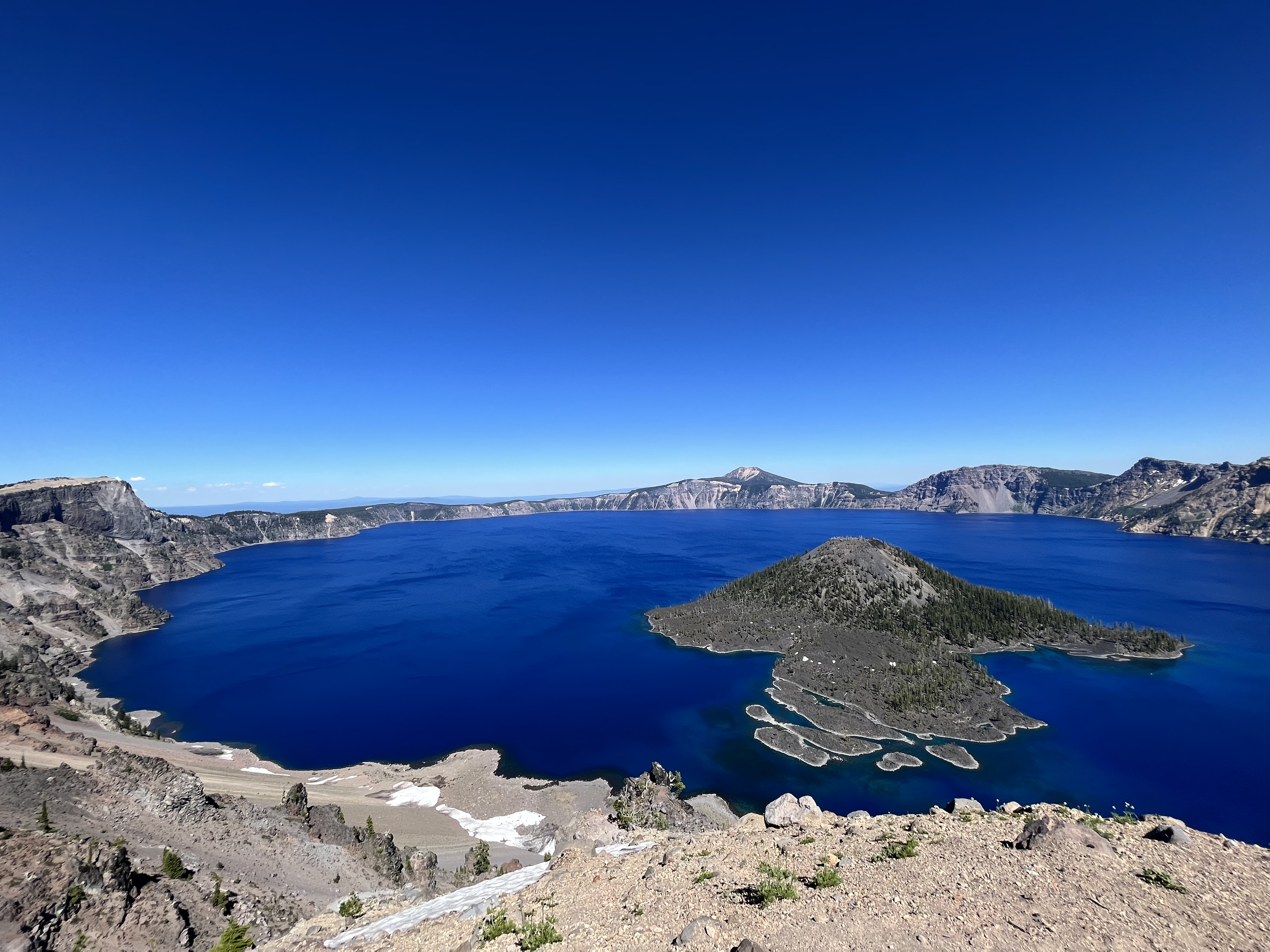
Crater Lake, the most recent caldera to form in the Cascades

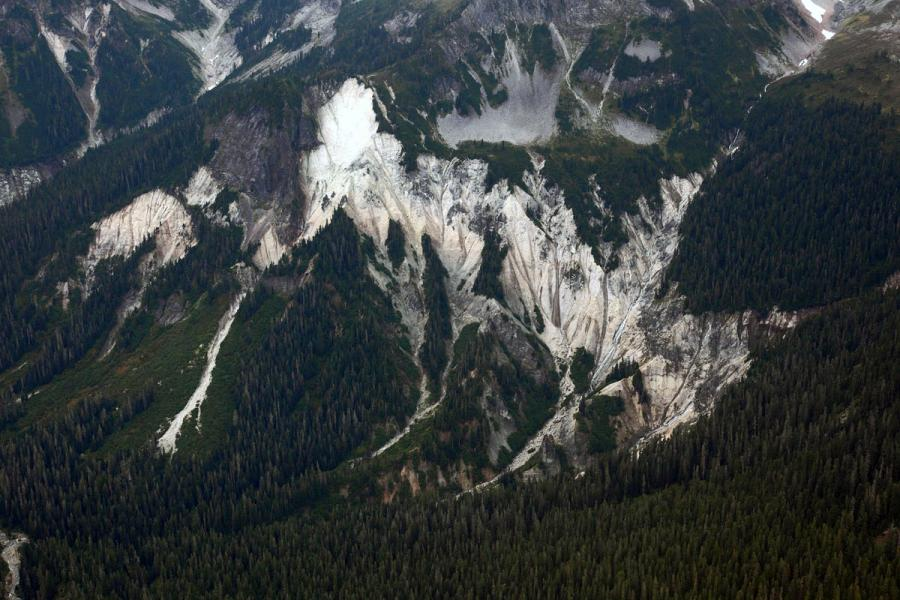
Kulshan Caldera's intracaldera ignimbrite deposit near Upper Swift Creek in the northwestern Mount Baker volcanic field, Washington.

== List of calderas ==
Volcano	Caldera Name	Caldera Size	Age	Eruption Unit Name	Magma Volume (km^{3})	Tephra Volume (km^{3})	VEI	Notes	Reference(s)
Silverthrone	Silverthrone caldera	20 km wide	<1,100,000	N/A	N/A	N/A		Poorly studied	
Franklin Glacier Complex	N/A	6 x 20 km	<6,800,000	N/A	N/A	N/A		Poorly studied	
Coquihalla Volcanic Complex	N/A	6 x 6 km	<21,400,000	N/A	N/A	50		Tephra volume does not represent a single eruption	
Hannegan	Hannegan caldera	8 x 3.5 km	3,722,000	Ignimbrite of Hannegan Peak	N/A	N/A	6-7	Trap-door caldera, first collapse. Both ignimbrites have a combined magma volume of 127 km^{3}	
			3,720,000	Ignimbrite of Ruth Mountain	N/A	N/A	6-7	Trap-door caldera, second collapse	
Big Bosom Buttes	Big Bosom caldera	4 x 5 km ?	Oligocene	N/A	N/A	N/A		Poorly studied	
Mount Rahm ?	Mount Rahm caldera	N/A	Oligocene	N/A	N/A	N/A		Poorly studied	
Mount Baker Volcanic Field	Kulshan Caldera	4.5 x 8 km	1,149,000	Lake Tapps tephra	124	N/A	7		
Gamma Ridge ?	Gamma Ridge caldera	N/A	1,242,000	N/A	40	N/A	6-7	Poorly studied, trap-door caldera	
Mount Aix Volcanic Complex	Mount Aix caldera	6 x 9	28,000,000	Bumping River tuff-north	N/A	N/A	6-7	Cummalitave volume of Mt. Aix tuffs exceeds 100 km^{3}	
			25,000,000	Bumping River tuff-east	N/A	N/A	6-7		
			25,000,000	Cash Prairie tuffs	N/A	N/A	6-7		
Goat Rocks	Devils Horns caldera	5 x 8 km	3,200,000	N/A	N/A	>60	6	Tephra volume may represent multiple eruptions	
Newberry	Newberry Crater	6.4 x 8 km	80,000	Olema ash	14-22	N/A	6	Second caldera formation	
			230,000	Tepee Draw tuff	10	25	6	First caldera formation	
Mount Mazama	Crater Lake	8 x 10 km	5783 BCE	Mazama ash	61	176	7	Largest Holocene eruption in the arc	
			29,900	Trego Hot Springs	8	20.8	6		
Medicine Lake	Medicine Lake caldera	7 x 12 km	171,000	Antelope Well tuff	20	N/A	6		
Lassen Volcanic Center	Rockland caldera	N/A	610,000	Rockland tephra	130	326.7	7		

== Places where calderas could be ==
These are places that have experienced very large eruptions of ash and ignimbrite that reached a VEI of 6 or greater, but have no documented calderas.

=== Tumalo Volcanic Center ===
The Tumalo Volcanic Center is a volcano located just east of Bend, Oregon. It started producing large eruptions around 650,000 years ago, with its first eruption reaching a 5 on the VEI scale and erupting more than 1 km^{3} of magma. The volcano would go on to produce at least three more voluminous eruptions. The two largest eruptions ejected more than 5 km^{3} of magma. Eruptions of those sizes usually entail caldera collapses. However no calderas have been identified in this area.

=== Deschutes Formation ===
Between 6.25 and 5.45 million years ago the cascade volcanic arc flared up in activity. Producing far more explosive ignimbrite eruptions than usual. The activity was mostly focused within the central Oregon cascades. Over 78 individual eruptions have been identified and the total volume of pyroclastic products in the Deschutes formation is estimated to be between 400 and 675 km^{3}.
