= KBNZ-LD =

Television station in Bend, Oregon

- Bend, Oregon; United States
- Channels: Digital: 7 (VHF); Virtual: 7
- Branding: KBNZ; Central Oregon Daily

Programming
- Affiliations: CBS

Ownership
- Owner: BendBroadband; (Telephone and Data Systems); (TDS Broadcasting LLC)
- Sister stations: KOHD

History
- First air date: c. 1985 (current license dates from October 25, 2008)
- Former call signs: K11SE (1985–2006); K07YM (2006–2008)
- Call sign meaning: Bend

Technical information
- Licensing authority: FCC
- Facility ID: 35834
- Class: LD
- ERP: 3 kW
- HAAT: 211 m (692 ft)
- Transmitter coordinates: 44°4′38.2″N 121°20′0.7″W

Links
- Public license information: LMS
- Website: www.centraloregondaily.com/kbnz-cbs/

KBNZ-LD (channel 7) is a low-power television station in Bend, Oregon, United States, serving Central Oregon as an affiliate of CBS. It is owned by local cable company BendBroadband alongside ABC affiliate KOHD (channel 18). The two stations share studios on Lower Meadow Drive in Bend; KBNZ-LD's transmitter is located in the city on Awbrey Butte west of US 97.

Because the low-power broadcasting radius of KBNZ-LD does not reach the entire market, the station is simulcast on sister station KOHD's second digital subchannel (18.2) in 1080i high definition.

== History ==
KBNZ's logo as a semi-satellite of KOIN, from 2008 to 2011

KBNZ originated in the mid-1980s as a low-power translator of KOIN in Portland. In October 2008, KOIN owner New Vision Television announced plans to convert KBNZ into a locally-focused CBS affiliate. The station was upgraded to a low-power license under new calls, KBNZ, on June 13, 2008. On October 26, 2008, it relaunched as Central Oregon's first locally-based CBS affiliate. Four of KOIN's translators in Central Oregon were switched from airing KOIN's signal to that of KBNZ. It also received its own section on KOIN's website. Master control and some internal operations remained based at KOIN's studios at the KOIN Tower in Downtown Portland.

Although identifying as a separate station in its own right, KBNZ was considered a semi-satellite of KOIN. It cleared all network programming as provided through its parent and simulcast most of KOIN's newscasts, but aired a separate offering of syndicated programming as well as separate commercials.

One reason that the station split from KOIN is a result of the Bend market growing in population. The change left MyNetworkTV affiliate KUBN-LD as the only area station serving as a full-time satellite of a Portland station. News personnel based at KBNZ began to contribute two to four local stories each day to air on KOIN broadcasts. It had been planned that as KBNZ grew, a fully produced local newscast originating from Central Oregon would be introduced.

KBNZ's signal does not reach far outside Bend. The only other area it reaches is Deschutes River Woods which is south of Bend and can only be obtained in the northern tip of the area. KBNZ's signal can also be seen in the western portion of Crook County. K31CR-D transmits a digital rebroadcast of KOIN programming and is not available east of Prineville but services an area larger than KBNZ. K31CR's signal reaches Crook, Jefferson, Deschutes, and Wasco counties. In contrast, KBNZ's signal does not exit Deschutes County.

On March 31, 2010, BendBroadband bought KBNZ from New Vision Television through a subsidiary, Zolo Media. The new owner initially didn't plan any immediate or major changes. With the ownership change, contact information for this station as well as listings for reporter Brittney Hopper and photographer Brandon Anderchuk were removed from the KBNZ section of KOIN's website. The weather information for the Bend area on the KBNZ section went without updates for a time before being removed as well.

In the summer of 2011, KBNZ launched a new website. Zolo Media also announced that it would take over master control operations from KOIN, starting on September 1. With the severing of the electronic umbilical cord with KOIN, KBNZ also dropped KOIN's 5:30 p.m. and 6 p.m. newscasts and rolled out a new logo.

BendBroadband announced on May 1, 2014, that it would merge with Telephone and Data Systems, a Chicago-based cable firm, in a $261 million deal.

== News operation ==
In April 2016, Zolo Media announced the debut of a local news program to air on both KBNZ and KOHD starting on May 2, 2016, called Central Oregon Daily. KBNZ currently airs newscasts weekdays at noon, 6 p.m., 7 p.m. and 11 p.m., Saturdays at 6 p.m., and Sundays at 6 and 11 p.m.

== Subchannel ==
Subchannel of KBNZ-LD
Channel	Res.	Short name	Programming
7.1	1080i	KBNZ-DT	CBS

=== Translators ===
Since KBNZ is a low-power station, it relies on translators to expand its reach.

- K34AI-D La Pine
- K47LM-D Prineville
