= List of Mortar Board chapters =

Mortar Board is an American national honor society for college seniors. It was established on February 16, 1918, in Syracuse, New York, by the merger of four local women's organizations from four institutions. Following is a list of Mortar Board active chapters, with active chapters indicated in bold and inactive chapters and institutions in italics.

Chapter	Charter date and range	Institution	Location	Status	Ref.
Pi Sigma Chi	February 16, 1918 – 1965	Swarthmore College	Swarthmore, Pennsylvania	Inactive	(Note: Chapter formed from the pre-existing local honor society called Pi Sigma Chi.)
**Mabel G. Freeman**	February 16, 1918	Ohio State University	Columbus, Ohio	Active	(Note: Chapter formed from a pre-existing local honor society called Mortar Board, established in 1914.)
	February 16, 1918	University of Michigan	Ann Arbor, Michigan	Inactive	(Note: Chapter formed from the pre-existing local honor society called Mortarboard.)
Der Hexenkreis	February 16, 1918–2020	Cornell University	Ithaca, New York	Withdrew	(Note: Chapter formed from the women's secret society called Der Hexenkreis, established in 1892. It withdrew from the national society in 2020, to continue as a local honor society.)
Phi Delta Psi	1918–c. 2016	University of Illinois Urbana-Champaign	Champaign and Urbana, Illinois	Inactive	
**Friars**	1918	University of Missouri	Columbia, Missouri	Active	
Sigma Tau	1919	University of Minnesota	Saint Paul, Minnesota	Inactive	
	1919	DePauw University	Greencastle, Indiana	Inactive	
	1920	University of Wisconsin–Madison	Madison, Wisconsin	Inactive	
Adelphi-Gnouthautii	1920	Knox College	Galesburg, Illinois	Inactive	
Staff & Crown	1920	University of Kentucky	Lexington, Kentucky	Inactive	
**Black Masque**	1921	University of Nebraska–Lincoln	Lincoln, Nebraska	Active	
**Mrs. Granville Wells**	1921	Indiana University Bloomington	Bloomington, Indiana	Active	
	1921	University of Pennsylvania	Philadelphia, Pennsylvania	Active	
Pleiade	1922	Miami University	Oxford, Ohio	Inactive	
**Keod**	1922	Washington University in St. Louis	St. Louis, Missouri	Inactive	
	1922	Northwestern University	Evanston, Illinois	Active	(Note: Chapter formed from Cap and Tassel, a local senior women's honorary.)
**Iota**	1922	Lawrence University	Appleton, Wisconsin	Active	
**Eta**	1923	Carnegie Mellon University	Pittsburgh, Pennsylvania	Active	(Note: Chapter formed from The Sphinx (local), established in 1922 at the Carnegie Institute of Technology, which merged to form Carnegie Mellon University in 1967.)
Alpha Lambda Nu	1923	University of Pittsburgh	Pittsburgh, Pennsylvania	Inactive	
	1923–1975	University of Idaho	Moscow, Idaho	Inactive	
**Scroll & Script**	1923	University of Oregon	Eugene, Oregon	Active	
Gamma Tau	1923	Washington State University	Pullman, Washington	Inactive	
Visor	1923	University of Texas at Austin	Austin, Texas	Inactive	
	1924	University of Colorado Boulder	Boulder, Colorado	Inactive	
**Torch**	1924	University of Kansas	Lawrence, Kansas	Active	
**Laurel**	1924	West Virginia University	Morgantown, West Virginia	Active	
**Akraia**	1924	University of Vermont	Burlington, Vermont	Active	
**Theta Gamma**	1925	University of California, Berkeley	Berkeley, California	Active	
Owl & Triangle	1925	University of Oklahoma	Norman, Oklahoma	Inactive	
**Tolo**	1925	University of Washington	Seattle, Washington	Active	
Torch	1925	Iowa State University	Ames, Iowa	Inactive	
**Pi Sigma Alpha**	1926	University of Arizona	Tucson, Arizona	Active	
	1926	Whitman College	Walla Walla, Washington	Inactive	
Staff & Circle	1926	University of Iowa	Iowa City, Iowa	Inactive	
**Barbara Cook**	1926	Purdue University	West Lafayette, Indiana	Active	
Pi Sigma Alpha	1927	Montana State University	Bozeman, Montana	Inactive	
**Penetralia**	1927	University of Montana	Missoula, Montana	Active	
**XIX**	1928	Kansas State University	Manhattan, Kansas	Active	(Note: Chapter formed from the XIX Senior Honorary for Women (local), established in 1914.)
Banshee	1928–1985	Middlebury College	Middlebury, Vermont	Inactive	
**Keystone**	1928	University of South Dakota	Vermillion, South Dakota	Active	
**Virginia Gamma**	1928	College of William & Mary	Williamsburg, Virginia	Active	
**Torch & Tassel**	1929	University of Southern California	Los Angeles, California	Active	
**Hypatia**	1929	University of Alabama	Tuscaloosa, Alabama	Active	
**Women's Boosters**	1929	Ohio Wesleyan University	Delaware, Ohio	Active	
	1930	Pomona College	Claremont, California	Inactive	
**Pi Alpha**	1930	University of Richmond	Richmond, Virginia	Active	(Note: Chapter formed at Westhampton College for women which merged with the University of Richmond in 1990.)
Torchbearer	1931	Florida State University	Tallahassee, Florida	Inactive	
**Hoasc**	1931	Agnes Scott College	Decatur, Georgia	Active	
**Decima**	1932	Southern Methodist University	Dallas, Texas	Active	
**Mystic Thirteen**	1932	University of Cincinnati	Cincinnati, Ohio	Active	
**Quo Vadis**	1932	University of North Dakota	Grand Forks, North Dakota	Active	
**Cap & Gown**	1933	Oregon State University	Corvallis, Oregon	Active	
Order of the Acorn	1933	University of Utah	Salt Lake City, Utah	Inactive	
**Cap & Gown**	November 10, 1933	University of Wyoming	Laramie, Wyoming	Active	
Blazer	1934	Louisiana State University	Baton Rouge, Louisiana	Inactive	
Sphinx	1934	Michigan State University	East Lansing, Michigan	Inactive	
**Adele H. Stamp**	1934	University of Maryland, College Park	College Park, Maryland	Active	
Scroll	1935	Birmingham–Southern College	Birmingham, Alabama	Inactive	(Note: College closed in 2024.)
**Archousai**	1935	Pennsylvania State University	State College, Pennsylvania	Active	
**Cap & Gown**	1936	Denison University	Granville, Ohio	Active	
**Maia**	1936	University of New Mexico	Albuquerque, New Mexico	Active	
Kedros	1937	University of Denver	Denver, Colorado	Inactive	
Cap and Gown	1937	Grinnell College	Grinnell, Iowa	Inactive	
**Pi Sigma Alpha**	November 1937	University of Tennessee	Knoxville, Tennessee	Active	(Note: Chapter formed from Cap and Gown, a local senior women’s honorary society that was established in 1928.)
Cap and Gown	1938	University of New Hampshire	Durham, New Hampshire	Inactive	
Hour Glass	1938–1979	George Washington University	Washington, D.C.	Inactive	
Cresset	1938	Ohio University	Athens, Ohio	Inactive	
Parthenian	1939	University of Georgia	Athens, Georgia	Inactive	
**Agathai**	1939	University of California, Los Angeles	Los Angeles, California	Active	
Bachelor Maids	1940	Vanderbilt University	Nashville, Tennessee	Inactive	
Octagon	1940	University of Arkansas	Fayetteville, Arkansas	Inactive	
**Achofoa**	1940	Oklahoma State University	Stillwater, Oklahoma	Active	
	1941	Bucknell University	Lewisburg, Pennsylvania	Active	
**Chevron**	1941	Albion College	Albion, Michigan	Active	
**Tassels**	1942	University of Mississippi	Oxford, Mississippi	Active	
Star & Sceptor	1942	Mississippi University for Women	Columbus, Mississippi	Inactive	
Torch	1943	Cornell College	Mount Vernon, Iowa	Inactive	
Dranzen	1947	Occidental College	Los Angeles, California	Inactive	
**Keystone**	1948	Hood College	Frederick, Maryland	Active	
**Pallas**	1949	University of Louisville	Louisville, Kentucky	Active	
Laurels	1949	University of Connecticut	Storrs, Connecticut	Inactive	
**Senior Staff**	1950	University of Tulsa	Tulsa, Oklahoma	Active	
**Senior Bench**	1951	Beloit College	Beloit, Wisconsin	Active	
	November 4, 1951	Carleton College	Northfield, Minnesota	Active	(Note: Chapter formed from the Senior Women’s Honor Board (local), established in 1945.)
**Lux**	1952	Case Western Reserve University	Cleveland, Ohio	Active	(Note: Chapter formed at Western Reserve University, which merged to form Case Western Reserve University in 1967.)
Gold Key	1952	Wayne State University	Detroit, Michigan	Inactive	
Quadrangle	1953	University of Tennessee at Chattanooga	Chattanooga, Tennessee	Inactive	
Margaret Fuller Sieve & Shears	1954	Drake University	Des Moines, Iowa	Inactive	
	1954	Wichita State University	Wichita, Kansas	Active	
**Sphinx**	1954	Auburn University	Auburn, Alabama	Active	
Isogon	1955	University of Massachusetts Amherst	Amherst, Massachusetts	Inactive	
W.E.B.S.	1955	University of Redlands	Redlands, California	Inactive	
Kalon	1955–1976	St. Lawrence University	Canton, New York	Inactive	
Target	1955	Westminster College	New Wilmington, Pennsylvania	Inactive	
**Scarlet Quill**	1956	Butler University	Indianapolis, Indiana	Active	
Hood & Tassel	1957	Chatham University	Pittsburgh, Pennsylvania	Inactive	
**Forum**	1957	Texas Tech University	Lubbock, Texas	Active	
**Alpha Sigma Sigma**	1958	Tulane University	New Orleans, Louisiana	Active	(Note: Chapter formed at H. Sophie Newcomb Memorial College, which was reorganized as part of Tulane University in December 2005.)
Cap & Gown	1958	Willamette University	Salem, Oregon	Inactive	
The Honor	1958	Stetson University	DeLand, Florida	Inactive	
**Otlah**	1959	University of Puget Sound	Tacoma, Washington	Active	
**Cap & Gown**	1959	University of Mary Washington	Fredericksburg, Virginia	Active	
Tassell	1960	University of Delaware	Newark, Delaware	Inactive	
Trianon	1960	University of Florida	Gainesville, Florida	Inactive	
Tau Iota Omega	1961	Colorado State University	Fort Collins, Colorado	Inactive	
**Dianne Portfleet Alcor**	1961	Hope College	Holland, Michigan	Active	(Note: Chapter formed from Alcor (local), established in 1936. It was originally called the Alcor chapter but was renamed in 2016 after its former advisor.)
Arista	1963	Western Michigan University	Kalamazoo, Michigan	Inactive	
Pleiades	1963	Arizona State University	Tempe, Arizona	Inactive	
Pierian	1964	University of Akron	Akron, Ohio	Inactive	
**Senior Staff**	1964	North Dakota State University	Fargo, North Dakota	Active	
**Torch**	1964	Rhodes College	Memphis, Tennessee	Active	
Aglaia	1965	Augustana College	Rock Island, Illinois	Inactive	
**Jane K. Smith Cap & Gown**	1965	San Diego State University	San Diego, California	Active	(Note: Chapter formed from the Cap & Gown Honor Society, established in 1932.)
Crown & Scepter	1965	University of California, Santa Barbara	Santa Barbara, California	Inactive	
**Hui Po'Okela**	1965	University of Hawaiʻi at Mānoa	Mānoa, Honolulu, Hawaii	Active	
Nu Kappa Tau	1965	University of Miami	Coral Gables, Florida	Inactive	
Skiff	1966	Drury University	Springfield, Missouri	Inactive	
Alpha Order	1967	University of South Carolina	Columbia, South Carolina	Inactive	
**Arrow & Mask**	1967	Wittenberg University	Springfield, Ohio	Active	
Gavel	1967	Converse University	Spartanburg, South Carolina	Inactive	
**Knolens**	1967	University of the Pacific	Stockton, California	Active	
Laurels	1967	University of Rhode Island	Kingston, Rhode Island	Inactive	
Mu Beta	1967	New Mexico State University	Las Cruces, New Mexico	Inactive	
Wakapa	1967	Bradley University	Peoria, Illinois	Inactive	
Cap & Gown	1968	American University	Washington, D.C.	Inactive	
Cap and Gown	1968	MacMurray College	Jacksonville, Illinois	Inactive	(Note: College closed in 2020.)
**Meritum**	1968	University of North Texas	Denton, Texas	Active	
**Zeta Chi**	1968	Oklahoma Baptist University	Shawnee, Oklahoma	Active	
**Cap & Gown**	1969	Bowling Green State University	Bowling Green, Ohio	Active	
Gown & Gavel	1969	Valparaiso University	Valparaiso, Indiana	Inactive	
**Tassels**	1969	Wake Forest University	Winston-Salem, North Carolina	Active	
**Women's Honor Organization**	1969	Emory University	Atlanta, Georgia	Active	
**Sally Steadman Azalea**	199	University of South Alabama	Mobile, Alabama	Active	
Ampersand	1970	Texas Christian University	Fort Worth, Texas	Inactive	
Cap & Gown	1970	University of Houston	Houston, Texas	Inactive	
Sigma Phi Eta	1970	Utah State University	Logan, Utah	Inactive	
**Clavia**	1971	Ball State University	Muncie, Indiana	Active	
Laurel	1971	Baylor University	Waco, Texas	Inactive	
**Pleiades**	1971	Northern Illinois University	DeKalb, Illinois	Active	
Senior Women's Honor Board	1971	Northern Arizona University	Flagstaff, Arizona	Inactive	
Women's Leadership Organization	1971	Fort Hays State University	Hays, Kansas	Inactive	
Adahi	1972	Eastern Michigan University	Ypsilanti, Michigan	Inactive	
**Alpha Theta Mu**	1972	Grove City College	Grove City, Pennsylvania	Active	
Athenaeum	1972	University of South Florida	Tampa, Florida	Inactive	
Cap & Gown	1972	California State University, Long Beach	Long Beach, California	Inactive	
Chenrizig	1972	University of Texas at El Paso	El Paso, Texas	Inactive	
Crimson Key	1972	Georgia State University	Atlanta, Georgia	Inactive	
Crown & Sceptre	1972	Wesleyan College	Macon, Georgia	Inactive	
Delphi	1972	Texas Woman's University	Denton, Texas	Inactive	
**Gold Key**	1972	University of Northern Colorado	Greeley, Colorado	Active	
Laurels	1972	Kent State University	Kent, Ohio	Inactive	
Sigma Lambda Sigma Society	1972	South Dakota State University	Brookings, South Dakota	Inactive	
Silver Tassel	1972	Idaho State University	Pocatello, Idaho	Inactive	
**Tau Pi**	1972	Monmouth College	Monmouth, Illinois	Active	
**Alpha Sigma Chi**	1973	Berea College	Berea, Kentucky	Active	
Delta Alpha	1973	University of Missouri–Kansas City	Kansas City, Missouri	Inactive	
Scho-Lea	1973	Trinity University	San Antonio, Texas	Inactive	
Senior Women's Honor Board	1973	Central Michigan University	Mount Pleasant, Michigan	Inactive	
Tassel	1973	University of Memphis	Memphis, Tennessee	Inactive	
**Alpha Chi Sigma**	1973	Berea College	Berea, Kentucky	Active	
Alpha Tau Delta	1974	Louisiana Tech University	Ruston, Louisiana	Inactive	
Cap and Gown	1974	Boston University	Boston, Massachusetts	Inactive	
**Panathenees**	1974	Carson–Newman University	Jefferson City, Tennessee	Active	
**Aurora**	1975	Ohio Northern University	Ada, Ohio	Active	
Cap and Gown	1975	University of Evansville	Evansville, Indiana	Inactive	
**Gold Circle**	1975	Tennessee Tech	Cookeville, Tennessee	Active	
Gold Key Honor Society	1975	Fisk University	Nashville, Tennessee	Inactive	
Honoratae	1975	University of Wisconsin–Milwaukee	Milwaukee, Wisconsin	Inactive	
Laurel Society	1975	Lake Erie College	Painesville, Ohio	Inactive	
Arista	1976	Western Illinois University	Macomb, Illinois	Inactive	
Gold Caps	1976	University of Wisconsin–Eau Claire	Eau Claire, Wisconsin	Inactive	
Hough Honor Society	1976	West Virginia Wesleyan College	Buckhannon, West Virginia	Inactive	
Red Tassel	1976	Illinois State University	Normal, Illinois	Active	
Sigma Lambda Delta	1976	Duquesne University	Pittsburgh, Pennsylvania	Inactive	
**Tassels**	1976	Hanover College	Hanover, Indiana	Active	
Order of Athena	1977	Clemson University	Clemson, South Carolina	Inactive	
Percy Warren Senior Honor Society	1977	James Madison University	Harrisonburg, Virginia	Inactive	
Senior Board	1977	University of Louisiana at Monroe	Monroe, Louisiana	Inactive	
Sigma Lambda Sigma Society	1977	Virginia Tech	Blacksburg, Virginia	Inactive	
Bronze Key	1978	University of Central Oklahoma	Edmond, Oklahoma	Inactive	
**Cap and Gown**	1978	Mississippi College	Clinton, Mississippi	Active	
**Panaegis**	1978	William Jewell College	Liberty, Missouri	Active	
Cap and Gown	1979	Texas A&M University	College Station, Texas	Inactive	
**Spires Honor Society**	1979	Troy University	Troy, Alabama	Active	
**Telion**	1979	Northern Michigan University	Marquette, Michigan	Active	
**Chi Sigma**	1980	Southern Nazarene University	Bethany, Oklahoma	Active	
Cap and Gown	1981	Midwestern State University	Wichita Falls, Texas	Inactive	
**Pamarista**	1982	Indiana State University	Terre Haute, Indiana	Active	
Cap and Gown	1983	Western Carolina University	Cullowhee, North Carolina	Inactive	
Collegiate Pentacle	1983	Eastern Kentucky University	Richmond, Kentucky	Inactive	
**Peppers Honor Society**	1983	University of Toledo	Toledo, Ohio	Active	
**Arete**	1984	Salem College	Winston-Salem, North Carolina	Active	
Tassels	1984	University of Central Missouri	Warrensburg, Missouri	Inactive	
**Crescent Honor Society**	1985	Coe College	Cedar Rapids, Iowa	Active	
**Scribes Honor Society**	1985	West Texas A&M University	Canyon, Texas	Active	
**Xi Phi**	1988	University of Nebraska at Kearney	Kearney, Nebraska	Active	
**Geist**	1993	Longwood University	Farmville, Virginia	Active	(Note: Chapter originated as the local honorary, the Joan Circle of Alpha Delta Rho, established in the 1920s. It joined the national Alpha Kappa Gamma but withdrew in 1966 and became the local organization Geist, which became a chapter of Mortar Board.)
	2013	Alcorn State University	Lorman, Mississippi	Active	
**Alcalá**	October 22, 2000	University of San Diego	San Diego, California	Active	
**Schweitzer**	2007	Chapman University	Orange, California	Active	
**Kitty Freed Findlay**	2008	University of Findlay	Findlay, Ohio	Active	
EGAS	November 8, 2009	Illinois Wesleyan University	Bloomington, Illinois	Inactive	(Note: Chapter formed from EGAS society (local), established in 1937.)
Four Pillars	2011	California State University Channel Islands	Camarillo, California	Inactive	
	May 2014	Pacific Lutheran University	Parkland, Washington	Inactive	
**Blue and White Tassel**	2020	Jackson State University	Jackson, Mississippi	Active	
**Cisternam Sciential**	April 2023	College of Charleston	Charleston, South Carolina	Active	
	November 2, 2023	Life University	Marietta, Georgia	Active	
		Adrian College	Adrian, Michigan	Active	
		California State Polytechnic University, Pomona	Pomona, California	Inactive	
		California Polytechnic State University, San Luis Obispo	San Luis Obispo, California	Inactive	
		Colorado College	Colorado Springs, Colorado	Inactive	
		Eastern Illinois University	Charleston, Illinois	Inactive	
		Embry–Riddle Aeronautical University	Prescott, Arizona	Inactive	
**Triumph**		Endicott College	Beverly, Massachusetts	Active	
		Florida International University	University Park, Florida	Inactive	
Sutton		Indiana University of Pennsylvania	Indiana, Pennsylvania	Inactive	
		Lakeland University	Sheboygan, Wisconsin	Inactive	
**Arktos**		Lenoir–Rhyne University	Hickory, North Carolina	Active	
**Order of the Tartan**		Lyon College	Batesville, Arkansas	Active	
		Middle Tennessee State University	Murfreesboro, Tennessee	Inactive	
		Mississippi State University	Mississippi State, Mississippi	Inactive	
		Northwest Missouri State University	Maryville, Missouri	Inactive	
		Oregon State University–Cascades	Bend, Oregon	Inactive	
		Otterbein University	Westerville, Ohio	Active	
		Queens University of Charlotte	Charlotte, North Carolina	Inactive	
		Rowan University	Glassboro, New Jersey	Inactive	
Ivy		Seattle Pacific University	Seattle, Washington	Inactive	
		Spelman College	Atlanta, Georgia	Inactive	
Athena		Stephens College	Columbia, Missouri	Inactive	
Quadrangle		Texas Wesleyan University	Fort Worth, Texas	Inactive	
Launch		University at Buffalo	Buffalo, New York	Inactive	
**Tau Delta**		University of Minnesota Duluth	Duluth, Minnesota	Active	
		University of Texas at San Antonio	San Antonio, Texas	Inactive	
		Washburn University	Topeka, Kansas	Active	
**Pynchon**		Western New England University	Springfield, Massachusetts	Active	
		Xavier University	Cincinnati, Ohio	Active	
