= TDS Telecom =

American telecommunications company

TDS Telecommunications LLC
- Company type: Subsidiary
- Industry: Telecommunications
- Founded: 1969
- Headquarters: Madison, Wisconsin, United States
- Parent: Telephone and Data Systems
- Website: tdstelecom.com

TDS Telecom is an American telecommunications company with headquarters in Madison, Wisconsin. It is a wholly owned subsidiary of Telephone and Data Systems Inc, and is the seventh-largest local exchange carrier in the U.S. TDS Telecom offers telephone, broadband Internet and television services to customers in 30 states and more than 900 rural and suburban communities, though it also serves some urban metropolitan communities. It also sells businesses communications services, including VoIP (managed IP hosted) phone service, dedicated broadband Internet and hosted-managed services. With headquarters in Madison, TDS Telecom operates TDS Broadband LLC, and BendBroadband, and TDS Metrocom, LLC. Combined, the company employs nearly 3,300 people. In 2019, TDS Telecom and parent company TDS Inc. celebrated 50 years in business.

TDS Telecom is a participant in the FCC's Connect America Fund, also known as A-CAM. With this funding TDS is on a ten-year push to bring high speed internet to the furthest reaches of its rural serving areas. Depending on location, the vast majority of TDS customers in eligible rural areas are expected to receive broadband speeds of 25 Mbit/s download and 3 Mbit/s upload (25/3). The remaining customers are expected to receive broadband speeds at 10/1 and 4/1 Mbit/s. In less rural areas, TDS provides much higher broadband speeds, from 100 Mbps to 8 Gbps.

More recently, TDS has been launching new fiber to the home services across Wisconsin and Idaho. The new markets in Wisconsin include: Deforest, Windsor, McFarland, Monona Grove, Cottage Grove, Oregon, and Merrimac municipalities, all within Dane County. In Idaho the cities cities Coeur d'Alene, Rathdrum, Hayden, and Post Falls, all within Kootenai County. These services are offered by TDS through CLEC TDS Metrocom, LLC which is operated by TDS Telecom. Fiber to the home markets are 1 Gigabit speed markets with multiple speed offerings available to customers.

== TDS Metrocom ==
TDS Metrocom is TDS Telecom's local phone business, providing customers with phone, data, and Internet services in a five-state area in the midwestern United States. Its central office is located at 3416 University Ave in Madison, Wisconsin. Unlike Telecom, Metrocom used a deal brokered by Tommy Thompson to allow for local phone service competition on AT&T's lines in exchange for long distance plan selling rights over landline. They are no longer offering this service to new residential subscribers, but continue to maintain existing contracts, new features, or new locations on existing accounts. TDS Metrocom is currently in maintenance mode, where they are allowed to maintain existing telephone and Internet installations but not add any new telephone or Internet accounts. Business accounts are still available.

== Subsidiaries ==
Subsidiaries include:

- Butler Telephone Co., Butler, Alabama
- Oakman Telephone Co., Oakman, Alabama
- Peoples Telephone Co., Centre, Alabama
- Cleveland County Tel. Co., Rison, Arkansas
- Decatur Telephone Co., Decatur, Arkansas
- Arizona Telephone Co., Quartzsite, Arizona
- Southwestern Telephone Co., Quartzsite, Arizona
- Happy Valley Telephone Co., Olinda, California
- Hornitos Telephone Co., Olinda, California
- Winterhaven Telephone Co., Winterhaven, California
- Delta County Tele-Comm, Paonia, Colorado
- Strasburg Telephone Co., Strasburg, Colorado
- Quincy Telephone Co., Quincy, Florida (also serves Attapulgus, Georgia)
- Blue Ridge Telephone Co., Blue Ridge, Georgia
- Camden Telephone & Telegraph Co., St. Mary's, Georgia
- Nelson-Ball Ground Telephone Co., Nelson, Georgia
- Potlatch Telephone Co., Potlatch, Idaho
- Camden Telephone Co., Camden, Indiana
- Comm. Corp. of Indiana, Whitestown, Indiana
- Comm. Corp. of Southern Indiana, Poseyville, Indiana
- Home Company of Pittsboro, Pittsboro, Indiana
- Home Telephone Co., Waldron, Indiana
- Merchants & Farmers Telephone Co., Hillsboro, Indiana
- S & W Telephone Co., Sandborn, Indiana
- Tipton Telephone, Tipton, Indiana
- Tri-County Telephone Co., New Richmond, Indiana
- West Point Telephone Co., West Point, Indiana
- Leslie County Telephone Co., Hyden, Kentucky
- Lewisport Telephone Co., Lewisport, Kentucky
- Salem Telephone Co., Salem, Kentucky
- Cobbosseecontee Tel. Co., North Anson, Maine
- Hampden Telephone Co., Hampden, Maine
- Hartland & St. Albans Tel. Co., Hartland, Maine
- Somerset Telephone Co., North Anson, Maine
- The Island Telephone Co., Warren, Maine
- Warren Telephone Co., Warren, Maine
- West Penobscot Tel. & Tele. Co., Corinna, Maine
- Chatham Telephone Co., Chatham, Michigan
- Communication Corporation of Michigan, Augusta, Michigan
- Island Telephone Co., Sanford, Michigan
- Shiawassee Telephone Co., Perry, Michigan
- Wolverine Telephone Co., Millington, Michigan
- Arvig Telephone Co., Pequot Lakes, Minnesota
- Bridge Water Telephone Co., Monticello, Minnesota
- Mid-State Telephone Co., New London, Minnesota
- Winsted Telephone Company, Winsted, Minnesota
- Calhoun City Telephone Co., Calhoun, Mississippi
- Myrtle Telephone Co. Myrtle, Mississippi
- Southeast Miss. Tel. Co., Leakesville, Mississippi
- Contoocook Valley Tel. Co., Contoocook, New Hampshire
- Hollis Telephone Co., Hollis, New Hampshire
- Kearsarge Telephone Co., Kearsarge, New Hampshire
- Merrimack County Telephone, Contoocook, New Hampshire
- Union Telephone Co., Farmington, New Hampshire
- Wilton Telephone Company, Wilton, New Hampshire
- Deposit Telephone Co., Deposit, New York
- Edwards Telephone Co., Edwards, New York
- Oriskany Falls Telephone Corporation, Vernon, New York
- Port Byron Telephone Co., Port Byron, New York
- Township Telephone Co., Chaumont, New York
- Vernon Telephone Co., Vernon, New York
- Arcadia Telephone Co., Arcadia, Ohio
- Continental Telephone Co., Continental, Ohio
- Little Miami Communications Corporation, Fayetteville, Ohio
- Oakwood Telephone Company, Oakwood, Ohio
- The Vanlue Telephone Company, Vanlue, Ohio
- Mid-America Telephone Co., Stonewall, Oklahoma
- Wyandotte Telephone Co., Wyandotte, Oklahoma
- BendBroadBand Company, Bend, Oregon
- Mahanoy & Mahantango Tel. Co., Herndon, Pennsylvania
- Sugar Valley Telephone Co., Loganton, Pennsylvania
- McClellanville Telephone Co., McClellanville, South Carolina
- Norway Telephone Company, North, South Carolina
- St. Stephen Telephone Co., St. Stephen, South Carolina
- Williston Telephone Co., Williston, South Carolina
- Concord Telephone Exchange, Farragut, Tennessee
- Humphreys County Tel., New Johnsonville, Tennessee
- Tellico Telephone Co., Tellico Plains, Tennessee
- Tennessee Telephone Co., Parsons, Tennessee
- Amelia Telephone Corp., Amelia, Virginia
- New Castle Telephone Co., New Castle, Virginia
- Virginia Telephone Co., Hot Springs, Virginia
- Ludlow Telephone Company, Ludlow, Vermont
- Northfield Telephone Co., Northfield, Vermont
- Perkinsville Telephone Co., Perkinsville, Vermont
- Asotin Telephone Co., Asotin, Washington (also serves Oregon)
- Lewis River Telephone Co., La Center, Washington
- McDaniel Telephone Company, Salkum, Washington
- Badger Telecom, Neillsville, Wisconsin
- Black Earth Telephone Co., Black Earth, Wisconsin
- Bonduel Telephone Co., Bonduel, Wisconsin
- Burlington, Brighton, & Wheatland Telephone Company, New Munster, Wisconsin
- Central State Telephone Co., Vesper, Wisconsin
- Dickeyville Telephone, Dickeyville, Wisconsin
- EastCoast Telecom, Valders, Wisconsin
- The Farmers Telephone Co., Lancaster, Wisconsin
- Grantland Telecom, Fennimore, Wisconsin
- Mid-Plains Telephone, Middleton, Wisconsin
- Merrimac Communications - Merrimac, Wisconsin
- Midway Telephone Co., Medford, Wisconsin
- Mosinee Telephone Co., Mosinee, Wisconsin
- Mt. Vernon Telephone Co., Verona, Wisconsin
- Riverside Telecom, Reeseville, Wisconsin
- Scandinavia Telephone Co., Iola, Wisconsin
- Southeast Telephone Co., Waterford, Wisconsin
- State Long Distance Telcom, Elkhorn, Wisconsin
- UTELCO, Monroe, Wisconsin
- Waunakee Telephone Co., Waunakee, Wisconsin
- Stockbridge & Sherwood Telephone Company, Sherwood, Wisconsin
- Tenney Telephone Co., Alma, Wisconsin

== See also ==
- List of United States telephone companies
