= Oregon State University–Cascades =

University branch campus in Bend, Oregon, US

- OSU–Cascades
- Type: Public branch campus
- Established: 2001
- Parent institution: Oregon State University
- Students: 1,374 (2020 Fall)
- Location: Bend, Oregon, United States; 44°2′36″N 121°20′3″W
- Campus: 120 acres (49 ha)
- Website: www.osucascades.edu

Oregon State University–Cascades (OSU–Cascades) is a branch campus of Oregon State University (OSU) in Bend, Oregon. It is the only university in Central Oregon that offers both baccalaureate and graduate programs. OSU–Cascades also offers professional pathways and certificate programs. The 30-acre campus is the first public university to open in Oregon in more than 50 years. The campus plans to expand academically with new degree programs over a 10-year period.

== History ==
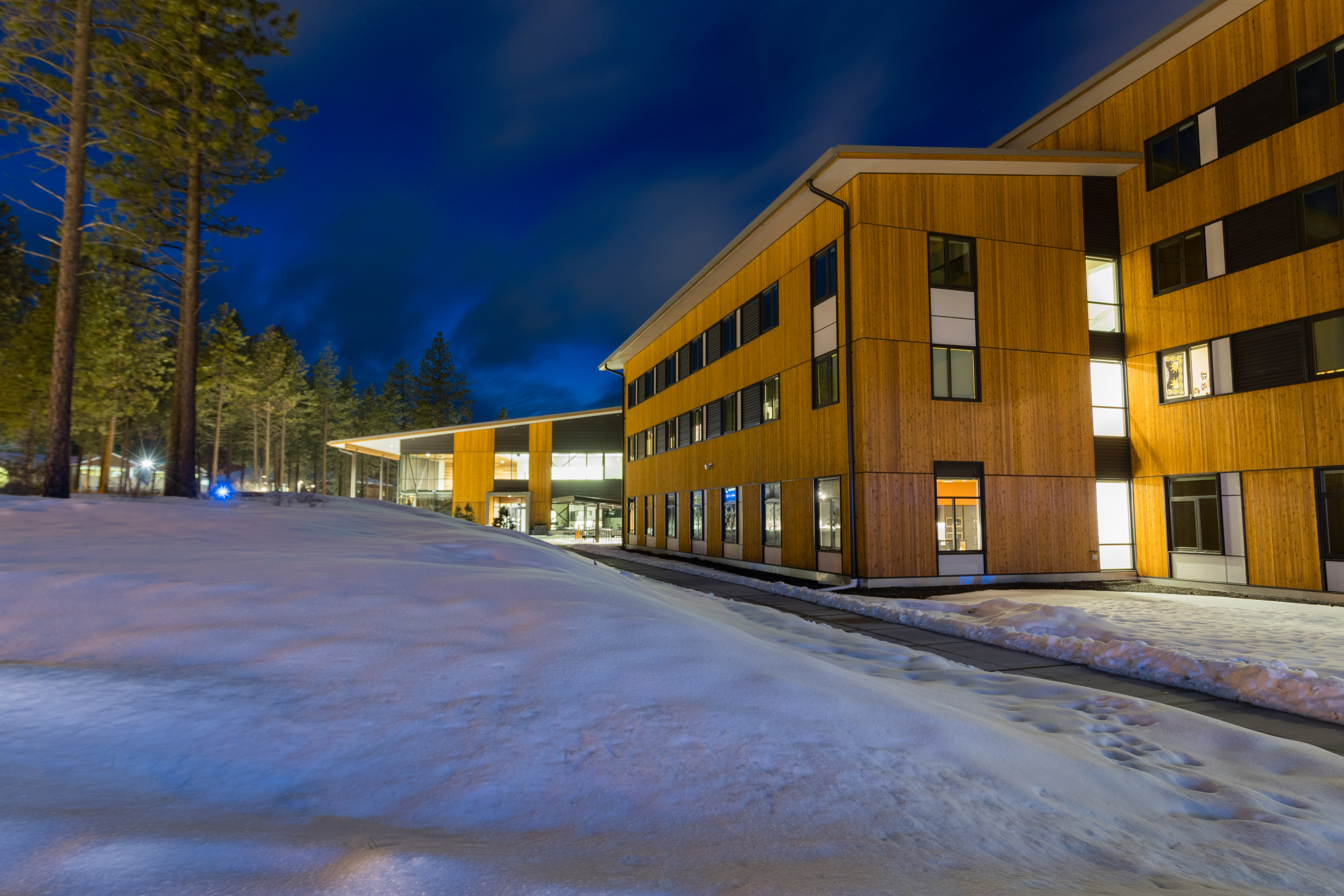
The OSU-Cascades campus in Bend, OR.

OSU–Cascades was established in 2001. In August 2012, the Oregon State Board of Higher Education approved OSU's plan to expand the campus into a four-year school. Oregon State University planned to add freshman and sophomore level classes to the Cascades campus as early as 2015, though it was not decided if the current location would be used or if a new campus would be built. During the 2013 legislative session, the Oregon Legislative Assembly approved $16 million in construction bonds to finance a new, expanded four-year campus in Bend for OSU–Cascades. A supplement of $8 million in philanthropic funds and campus-supported bonds would create a financing package totaling $24 million. A suitable building site would require 40 to 60 acres.

=== 2018 expansion ===
In early 2018, the Oregon Legislature approved a $39 million state-backed bond to expand the OSU–Cascades campus. Supported by Governor Kate Brown, the expansion would go towards the construction of a new academic building, focused on STEAM fields. The building was to feature labs, classrooms, and faculty offices. Majors such as kinesiology, engineering, art, and outdoor products would be housed within the new building. Construction was projected to begin in Summer 2019 with the facility scheduled to open in Fall 2021.

OSU–Cascades purchased a 73-acre demolition landfill from Deschutes County for $1 in late 2017. The landfill sits adjacent to the Cascades campus, and was previously used to collect construction debris. The expected cost of the site cleanup is $43.3 million. The university also owns another 46 acres from an old pumice mine, located next to the landfill. With over 100 acres purchased, OSU–Cascades plans to expand their 10-acre campus. This expansion is projected to serve upwards of 5,000 students within the next decade. The Tumalo Volcanic Center is the source of the pumice for Cascades's to expand their campus.

The OSU–Cascade campus hopes to create a zero-waste sustainable campus by featuring "net-zero energy, water, and waste campuses".

== Academics ==
OSU–Cascades currently offers 24 undergraduate degree programs, ]

Student enrollment in fall of 2025 was just over 1,400. The university is working to increase enrollment to 5,000 over the next decade.

OSU–Cascades partners with Central Oregon Community College to offer a dual degree partnership. Students can take lower-division classes at the Central Oregon Community College and upper-division classes through OSU–Cascades or Oregon State University.

Additionally, OSU–Cascades serves students with small class sizes and one-on-one mentoring. The average undergraduate class size is 20 students.

=== Graduate programs ===
The institution offers Master's programs in Counseling, Teaching, and Creative Writing, and a doctoral program in Physical Therapy.

== Campus ==
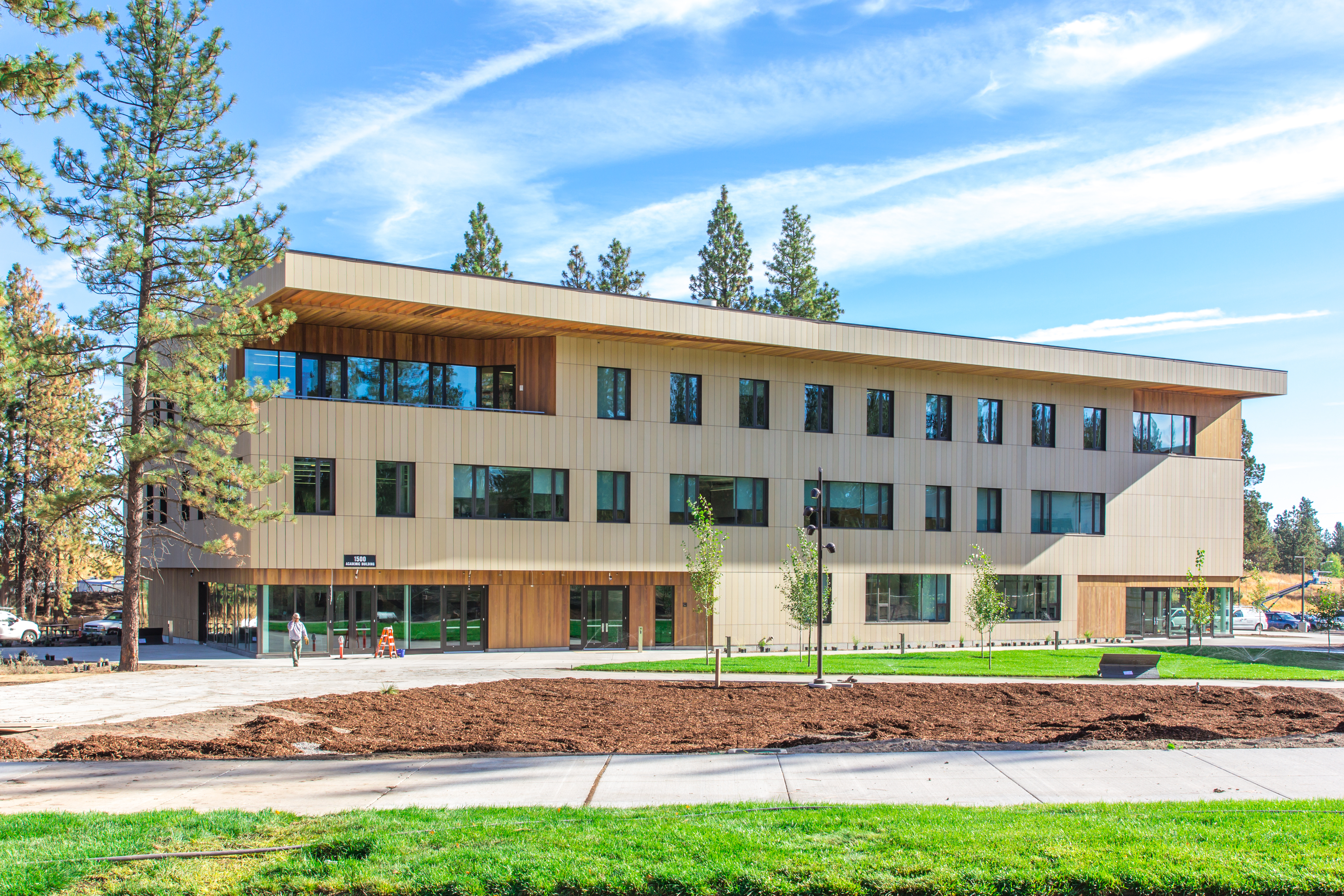
Tykeson hall

The campus, which opened in 2001 and operated in Cascades Hall at Central Oregon Community College, began offering four-year degrees by Fall 2015. The campus is currently seated on 10 acres (4.0 ha) of land, with four buildings on it (one of which is operated by the Bend Science Station). A fifth building, the Graduate and Research Center (GRC), is located a half-mile away near Deschutes Brewery. The GRC houses faculty offices and classrooms utilized by all Cascades students.

Tykeson Hall, named for businessman and philanthropist Don Tykeson, was opened in Fall 2016, and contains the majority of classrooms on campus. The building also houses faculty offices, administrative offices, and labs.

The Cascades Student Residence (CSR), which can house up to 304 students, is the university's only residence hall. The campus dining and academic building, Obsidian Hall, can hold up to 250 students. Both buildings were opened in January 2017.

Edward J. Ray Hall, named for former OSU President Emeritus Ed Ray, opened in the fall of the 2021–22 academic year. It serves the STEAM disciplines of science, technology, engineering, arts, and mathematics.

== Student demographics ==
For the Fall 2017 term, the first year of enrollment at the new campus (which features campus housing), had an enrollment of 1,204 students. Out of those students, there were 81 first-year students, 158 transfer students, and 249 graduate students. The majority of students are Oregon residents, making up 92 percent of the population with 67 percent of those students coming from Central Oregon. Eight percent of the students come from out-of-state with 28 of those students coming from seven countries.

In Fall 2017, about 25 percent of all OSU–Cascades students were the first in their families to attend college. Only eleven percent of OSU–Cascades students are under age 20. The average age of all OSU–Cascades students is 29 and the average age of graduate students is 33. Seven percent of students identified as Hispanic and six percent identified as two other United States minorities.

== Student life ==
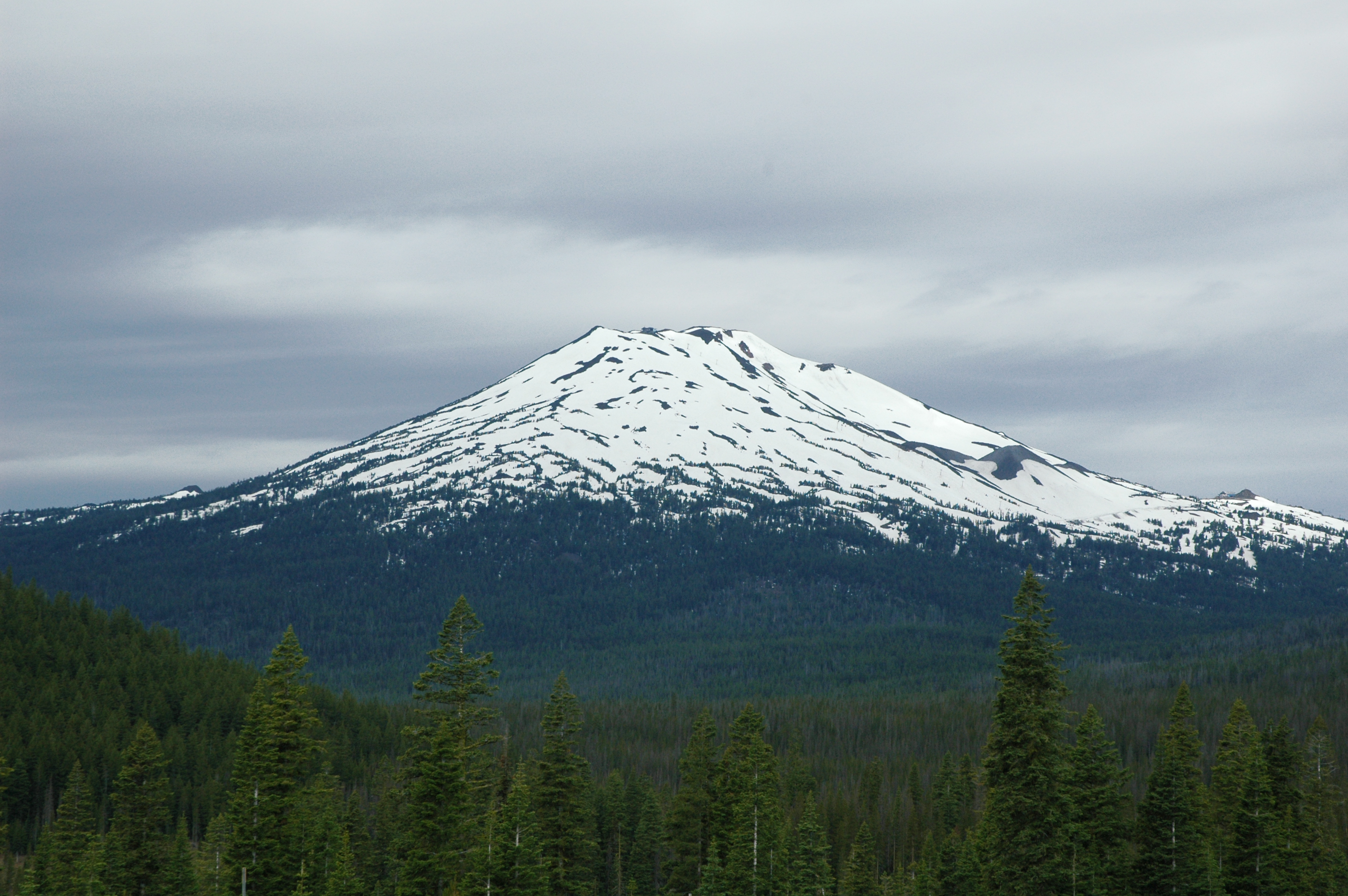
Mount Bachelor

Bend is Central Oregon's largest city and the seventh largest in the state. Bend lies between the Cascade Mountains and the Central Oregon high desert plateaus. The city, which started out as a lumber town when it was established in 1905, has become a tourist hub for outdoor recreation enthusiasts and beer-lovers alike, with dozens of hiking/biking trails and breweries. Mount Bachelor ski resort is also a popular tourist destination, and just 30 minutes from the cascades campus, providing students with easy access to the mountain.

The Oregon State Cascades Campus is located a short drive away from Mount Bachelor, the Factory Outlets, and the Hayden Homes Amphitheater. For students who are confined to campus, OSU Cascades offers over 20 student organizations and clubs that range from athletics to academics.

Because of the location of the school, near Mount Bachelor and the Three Sisters Wilderness, many clubs focus on outdoor activities provided by these locations.
