= Pocket Peak =

Mountain in Washington (state), United States

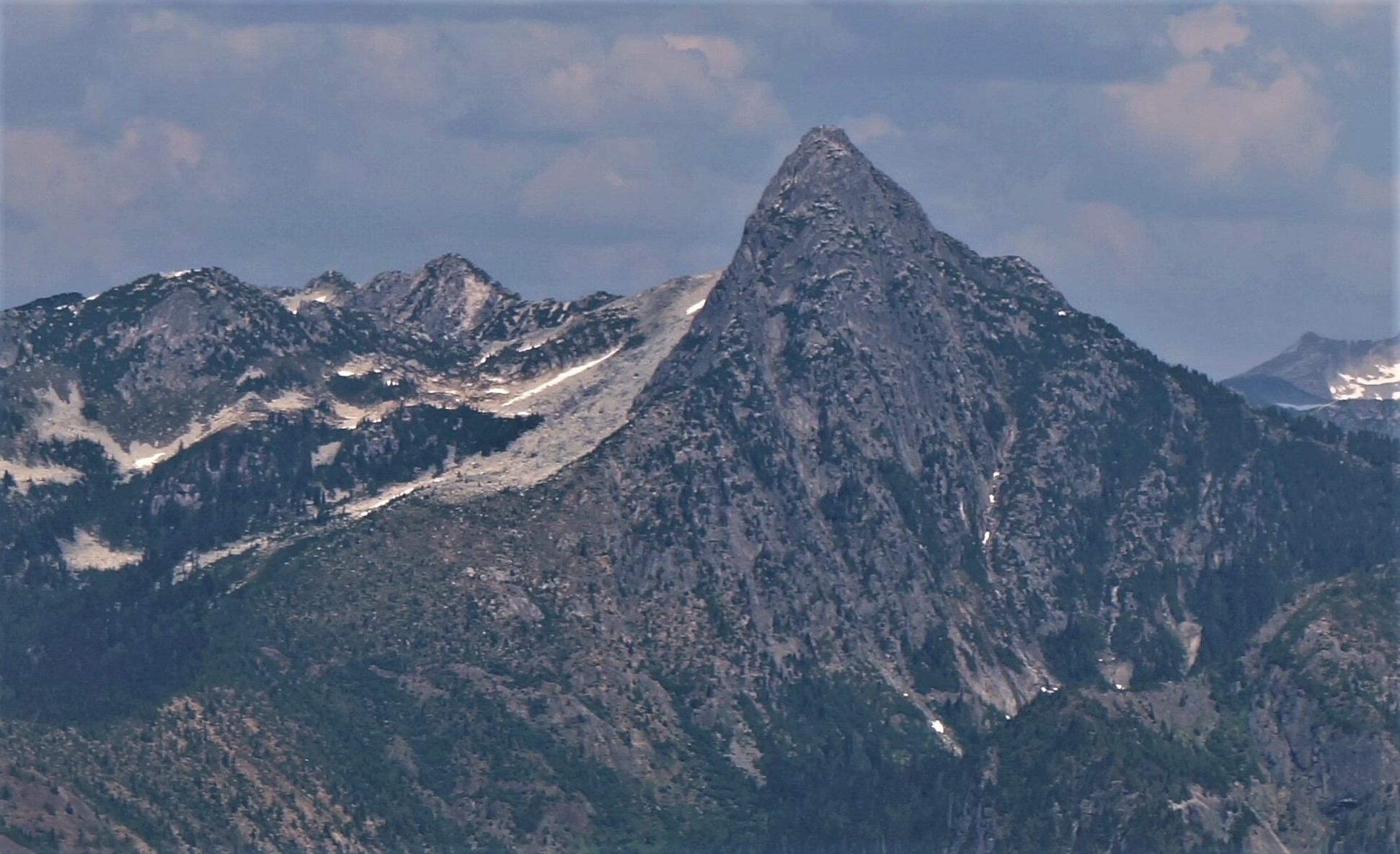
- Pocket Peak, west aspect

Highest point
- Elevation: 7,056 ft (2,151 m)
- Prominence: 1,136 ft (346 m)
- Parent peak: Rapid Peak (7,259 ft)
- Isolation: 2.25 mi (3.62 km)
- Coordinates: 48°59′22″N 121°33′06″W

Geography
- Location within Washington (state) Location within the United States
- Interactive map of Pocket Peak
- Location: Mount Baker Wilderness; Whatcom County, Washington, U.S.
- Parent range: Cascade Range; North Cascades; Skagit Range
- Topo map: USGS Mount Sefrit

Climbing
- First ascent: 1967 D. McKeever, R. Tabor
- Easiest route: class 4 scrambling

Pocket Peak is a 7,056-foot (2,151-metre) mountain summit located in the Skagit Range, which is a subset of the North Cascades in Whatcom County of Washington state. It is situated immediately west of Pocket Lake, and 4 mi (6.4 km) east of Mount Larrabee in the Mount Baker Wilderness, which is managed by Mount Baker-Snoqualmie National Forest. Pocket Peak is set on the Slesse Divide, 0.7 mile south of the Canada–United States border. Its nearest higher neighbor is Rapid Peak, 2.24 mi (3.60 km) to the southeast, North Big Bosom Butte is 2.5 miles to the southwest, and Slesse Mountain is set 3.24 mi (5.21 km) to the northwest. Other peaks which can be seen from the summit include Mount Baker, Mount Shuksan, American Border Peak, Mount Chardonnay, Mount Rexford, and many more. This unofficially named peak is named in association with officially named Pocket Lake. Precipitation runoff from this mountain drains into Silesia and Ensawkwatch Creeks, which are both tributaries of the Chilliwack River.

== Climate ==
Pocket Peak is located in the marine west coast climate zone of western North America. This climate supports a pocket glacier on its north slope. Most weather fronts originate in the Pacific Ocean, and travel northeast toward the Cascade Mountains. As fronts approach the North Cascades, they are forced upward by the peaks of the Cascade Range (Orographic lift), causing them to drop their moisture in the form of rain or snowfall onto the Cascades. As a result, the west side of the North Cascades experiences high precipitation, especially during the winter months in the form of snowfall. Due to its temperate climate and proximity to the Pacific Ocean, areas west of the Cascade Crest very rarely experience temperatures below 0 °F (−18 °C) or above 80 °F (27 °C). During winter months, weather is usually cloudy, but, due to high pressure systems over the Pacific Ocean that intensify during summer months, there is often little or no cloud cover during the summer. Because of maritime influence, snow tends to be wet and heavy, resulting in high avalanche danger. The months July through September offer the most favorable weather for viewing or climbing this peak.

== Geology ==
The North Cascades features some of the most rugged topography in the Cascade Range with craggy peaks, ridges, and deep glacial valleys. Geological events occurring many years ago created the diverse topography and drastic elevation changes over the Cascade Range leading to the various climate differences.

The history of the formation of the Cascade Mountains dates back millions of years ago to the late Eocene Epoch. With the North American Plate overriding the Pacific Plate, episodes of volcanic igneous activity persisted. In addition, small fragments of the oceanic and continental lithosphere called terranes created the North Cascades about 50 million years ago.

During the Pleistocene period dating back over two million years ago, glaciation advancing and retreating repeatedly scoured the landscape leaving deposits of rock debris. The U-shaped cross section of the river valleys is a result of recent glaciation. Uplift and faulting in combination with glaciation have been the dominant processes which have created the tall peaks and deep valleys of the North Cascades area.

== See also ==
- Geology of the Pacific Northwest
- Geography of the North Cascades

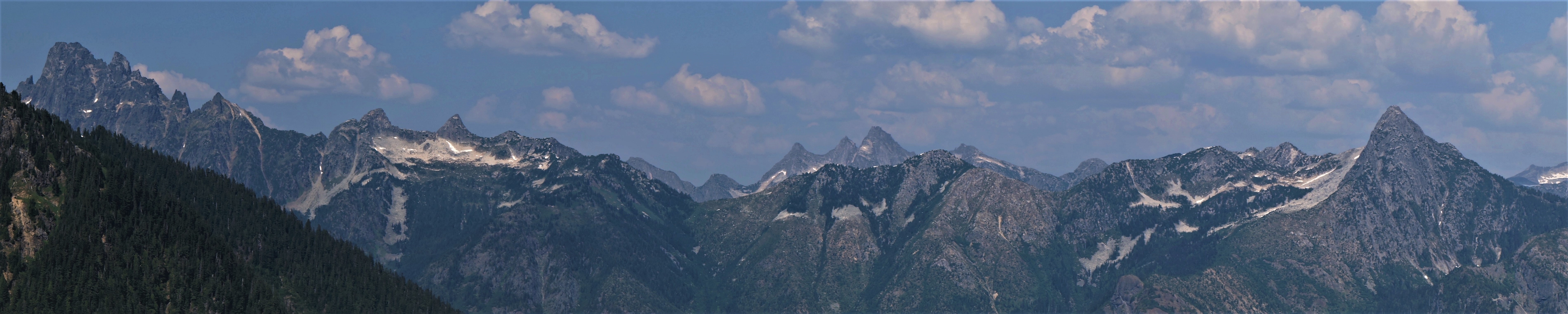
Slesse left, Rexford distant center, Pocket right
