= BendBroadband =

- Company type: Subsidiary
- Industry: Telecommunications; Mass media
- Founded: 1955
- Headquarters: Bend, Oregon, United States
- Area served: Central Oregon
- Products: Cable television Broadband internet VoIP phone Television broadcasting
- Revenue: US$70 million (2013)
- Number of employees: 280 (May 2014)
- Parent: Telephone and Data Systems
- Subsidiaries: Zolo Media; KBNZ; KOHD
- Website: bendbroadband.com

BendBroadband is a cable television and internet provider in the U.S. state of Oregon. Based in Bend, it serves Central Oregon and also owns several television stations and a data center. As of September 2014, the company became a wholly owned subsidiary of Telephone and Data Systems, a Fortune 500 company.

== History ==
The company was founded as Bend TV Cable in 1955. Don Ries and Fred Hartman worked to start the company that started with three channels and charged $3.69 per month. Donald Tykeson bought the company in 1983. In 1997, the company, then known as Bend Cable Communications Inc., started providing internet service. It announced in 1998 it would expand its fiber optic network to Redmond and Sisters. By 2004, the company had moved to the BendBroadband moniker, and that year introduced high-definition video-on-demand to its system utilizing technology from nCUBE.

In 2009, the company started a wireless network to provide internet and telephone service, which was upgraded to LTE in 2011. BendBroadband opened a 30,000-square-foot (2,800 m^{2}) data center, the Vault, in 2011. In February 2014, it sold off its LTE spectrum to AT&T. The company sold itself to Telephone and Data Systems (TDS) for $261 million in May 2014. At that time the company had $70 million in annual revenues and 280 employees with Amy Tykeson as CEO.

== Operations ==
BendBroadband serves 36,000 cable customers, 22,000 landline customers, and 41,000 internet customers. It also owns Zolo Media, which operates KBNZ, KOHD, and COTV11, plus an advertising division. The company also owns a data center, the Vault, which is now part of OneNeck IT Solutions, a TDS Company.
