= Tumalo Mountain =

Shield volcano, Cascade Range of Oregon

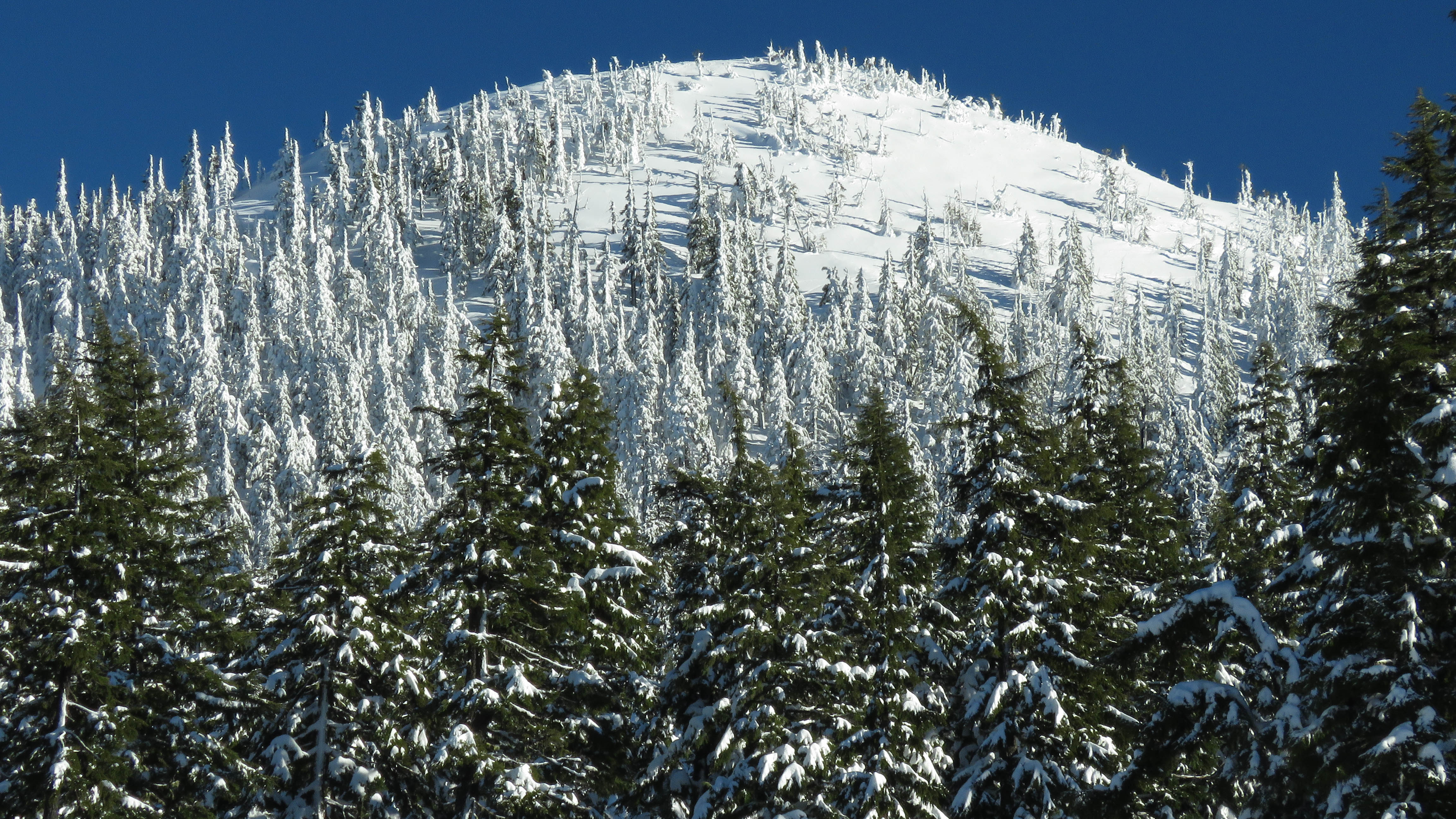
- Tumalo Mountain seen from below Mount Bachelor

Highest point
- Elevation: 7,779 ft (2,371 m) NAVD 88
- Prominence: 1,055 ft (322 m)
- Coordinates: 44°00′19″N 121°38′34″W

Geography
- Location: Deschutes County, Oregon, U.S.
- Parent range: Cascade Range
- Topo map: USGS Broken Top

Geology
- Mountain type: Shield volcano
- Volcanic arc: Cascade Volcanic Arc

Climbing
- Easiest route: Trail hike

Tumalo Mountain is a shield volcano in the Cascade Range of central Oregon, located just northeast of Mount Bachelor across the Cascade Lakes Scenic Byway.

== Climb, the views ==
Ice age glaciers carved a large cirque into the northeast flank of the mountain, producing a bowl which is popular with local backcountry skiers. A United States Forest Service fire lookout tower was built on the summit in the 1930s, but abandoned in the 1970s and subsequently removed.

The volcano's southwest flank is home to a route that leads to the top.

One can see Broken Top, Mt. Bachelor, and the Three Sisters Complex.

== See also ==
- Tumalo Volcanic Center
