= Don Tykeson =

American businessman and philanthropist

- Born: Donald Erwin Tykeson; April 11, 1927; Portland, Oregon, US
- Died: July 12, 2017 (aged 90); Eugene, Oregon, US
- Monuments: Tykeson Hall, University of Oregon; Tykeson Hall, Oregon State University Cascades Campus
- Education: B.S., Business Administration, 1951, University of Oregon

Donald Erwin Tykeson (April 11, 1927 – July 12, 2017) was an American businessman and philanthropist. The owner of BendBroadband, he was also a founding board member of C-SPAN.

== Early life and education ==
The son of O. Ansel Tykeson and Hillie M. Haveman, Don Tykeson was born April 11, 1927, in Portland, Oregon. He was reared on his family's farm near Newberg, Oregon. Tykeson began his education at the Mountain Top one-room school, and he won a statewide Future Farmers of America public speaking contest.

He met Rilda M. "Willie" Steigleder, another student at the University of Oregon, and they married in 1950. The couple had three children.

At age 30 Tykeson was diagnosed with multiple sclerosis (MS). He called MS his "old friend," crediting it with pushing him to "concentrate on what mattered most".

== Career and philanthropy ==
Tykeson worked in the communications industry throughout his adult life, beginning in sales at The Oregon Journal, and then managing and buying minority interest in Liberty Communications/KEZI of Eugene, Oregon. He purchased Bend Cable in 1983, which became BendBroadband.

By 1983, when his firm was sold for US$186 million to Tele-Communications Inc., it "had become one of the top 20 cable operators in the nation." Tykeson was a founding board member of C-SPAN.

Tykeson and his wife were major donors to the University of Oregon, Oregon State University, Oregon Health & Science University, Sacred Heart Medical Center in Eugene, and Lane Community College. His daughters estimated their parents have donated "tens of millions of dollars to organizations involved in education, science, health and the arts".

The National Multiple Sclerosis Society noted, "Their support of the National MS Society has included funding MS research at Oregon Health and Science University and supporting programs and services for people with MS throughout the Pacific Northwest."

== Awards and legacy ==
The University of Oregon constructed a new student advising center named "Tykeson Hall" after Tykeson and his wife Wille, with construction completed during Summer 2019 and its grand opening on October 25, 2019. Oregon State University also has named a building "Tykeson Hall" at the Cascades campus in Bend, Oregon.
