= Mount Bachelor =

Dormant stratovolcano in Oregon, United States

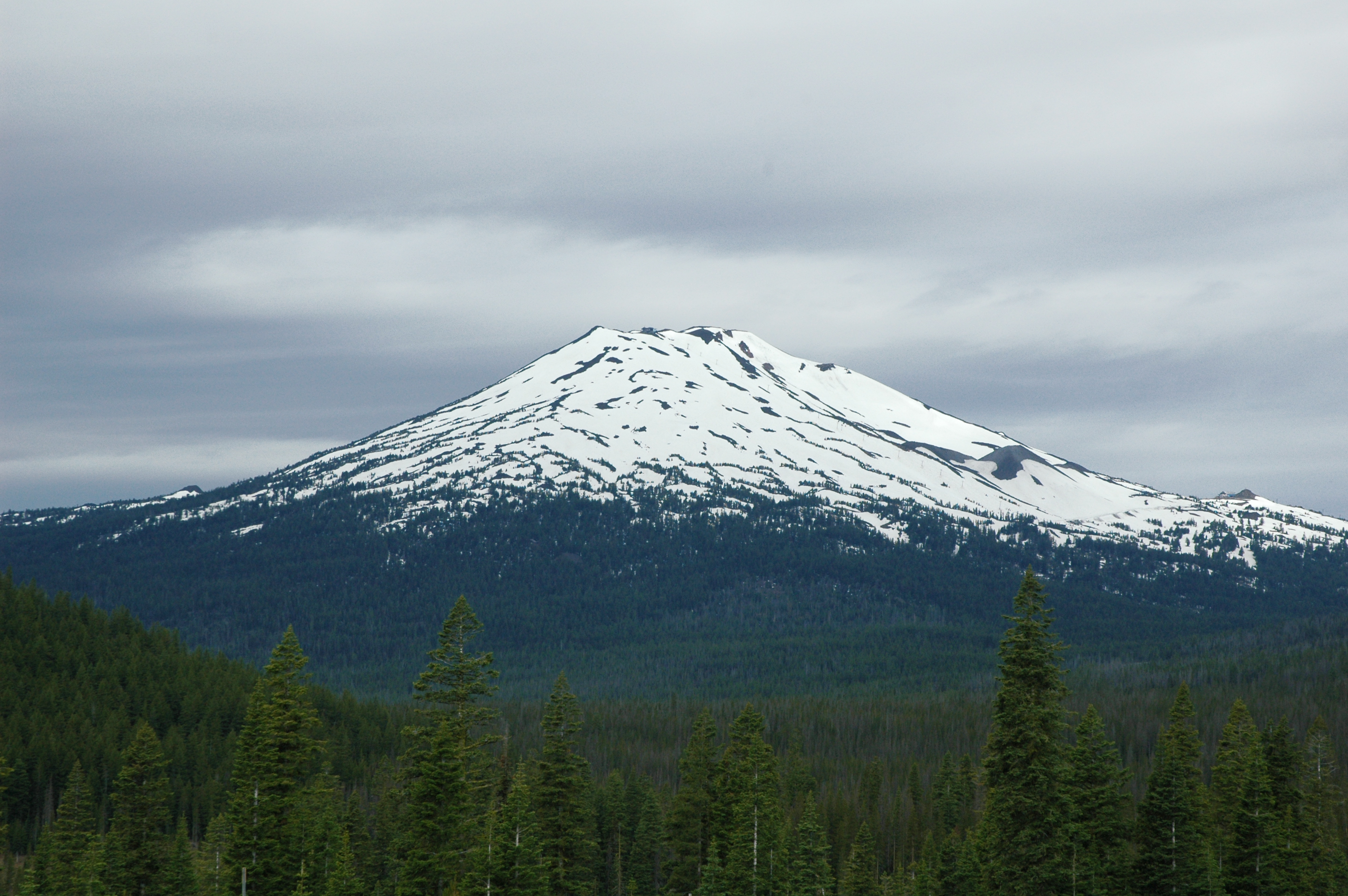
- Mount Bachelor from the Cascade Lakes Scenic Byway (east of the mountain)

Highest point
- Elevation: 9,068 ft (2,764 m) NAVD 88
- Coordinates: 43°58′46″N 121°41′19″W

Geography
- Location: Deschutes County, Oregon, U.S.
- Parent range: Cascade Range
- Topo map: USGS Mount Bachelor

Geology
- Formed by: Subduction zone volcanism
- Rock age: Less than 15,000 years
- Mountain type: Stratovolcano (on top of a shield volcano)
- Volcanic arc: Cascade Volcanic Arc
- Last eruption: 5800 BC

Climbing
- Easiest route: Ski lifts

Mount Bachelor, formerly named Bachelor Butte, is a dormant stratovolcano atop a shield volcano in the Cascade Volcanic Arc and the Cascade Range of central Oregon, United States. Named Mount Bachelor because it stands apart from the nearby Three Sisters, it lies in the eastern segment of the central portion of the High Cascades, the eastern segment of the Cascade Range. The volcano lies at the northern end of the 15-mile (24 km) long Mount Bachelor Volcanic Chain, which underwent four major eruptive episodes during the Pleistocene and the Holocene. The United States Geological Survey considers Mount Bachelor a moderate threat, but Bachelor poses little threat of becoming an active volcano in the near future. It remains unclear whether the volcano is extinct or just inactive.

The Mount Bachelor ski area has operated on the mountain since 1958, and the volcano's summit hosts the Mount Bachelor Observatory. A center of winter recreation, the area offers alpine skiing and snowboarding, cross-country skiing, and dog sledding, among other activities. The summit can be reached by a climbing trail that travels over lava from the volcano.

== Geography ==
Mount Bachelor lies in the Cascade Range, within Deschutes County, in the U.S. state of Oregon. It is located south of the Three Sisters complex volcano, and reaches an elevation of 9,068 feet (2,764 m).^{[a]} It rises 3,500 feet (1,100 m) above its base, with a proximal relief of 2,674 feet (815 m). The volcano has a volume of 6.0 cubic miles (25 km^{3}). Mount Bachelor stands 3 miles (4.8 km) southeast of the Tumalo Mountain volcano and 18 miles (29 km) to the southwest of the city of Bend, in the Deschutes National Forest.

Weather varies greatly in the area due to the rain shadow caused by the Cascade Range. Air from the Pacific Ocean rises over the western slopes, which causes it to cool and dump its moisture as rain (or snow in the winter). Precipitation increases with elevation. Once the moisture is wrung from the air, it descends on the eastern side of the crest, which causes the air to be warmer and drier. On the western slopes, precipitation ranges from 80 to 125 inches (200 to 320 cm) annually, while precipitation over the eastern slopes varies from 40 to 80 inches (100 to 200 cm) in the east. Temperature extremes reach 80 to 90 °F (27 to 32 °C) in summers and −20 to −30 °F (−29 to −34 °C) during the winters.

== Geology ==
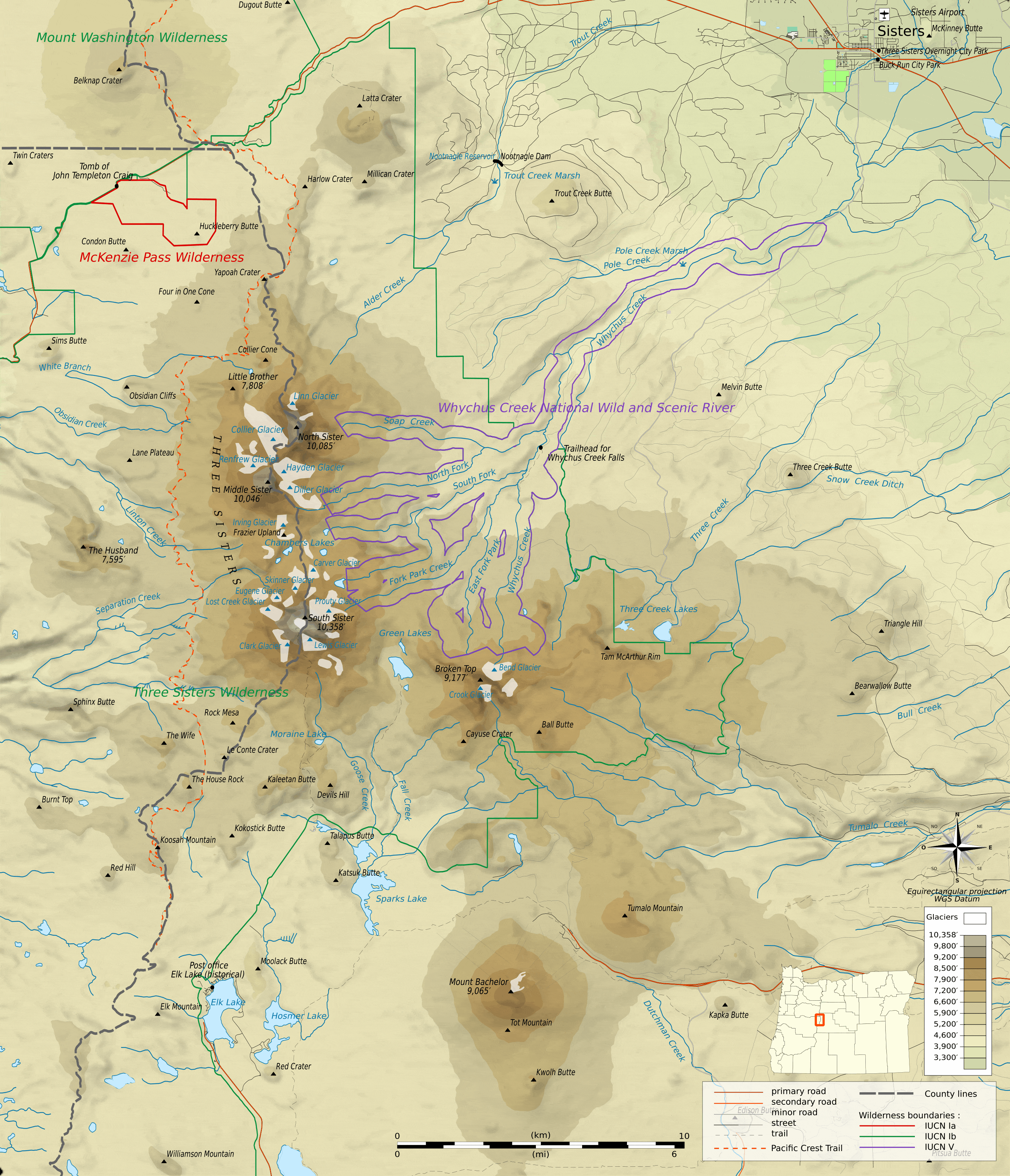
Topographic map of area (with Bachelor near bottom center)

Mount Bachelor joins several other volcanoes in the eastern segment of the Cascade Range known as the High Cascades, which trends north–south. Constructed towards the end of the Pleistocene Epoch, these mountains are underlain by more ancient volcanoes that subsided due to parallel north–south faulting in the surrounding region. Bachelor lies in the eastern segment of the central portion of the High Cascades.

Mount Bachelor is the youngest prominent volcano in the Three Sisters area of Oregon, a group of closely grouped volcanic peaks, in contrast to the typical 40-to-60-mile (64 to 97 km) spacing between volcanoes elsewhere in the Cascades. Among the most active volcanic areas in the Cascades and one of the most densely populated volcanic centers in the world, the Three Sisters region includes peaks such as Belknap Crater, Mount Washington, Black Butte, and Three Fingered Jack to the north, and Broken Top and Mount Bachelor to the south. Most of the surrounding volcanoes consist of mafic (rich in magnesium and iron) lavas; only South and Middle Sister have an abundance of silicic rocks such as andesite, dacite, and rhyodacite. Mafic magma is less viscous; it produces lava flows and is less prone to explosive eruptions than silicic magma.

The Mount Bachelor volcanic chain, southeast of South Sister, consists of Mount Bachelor, which is the largest and northernmost volcano of the group, and a series of cinder cones, lava flows, and three shield volcanoes. The chain runs for 15 miles (24 km) and encompasses an area of about 100 square miles (260 km^{2}), trending from north to south. Its volcanoes show significant variation in size and shape, ranging from steep cones produced by mild explosive activity to the gently sloping profiles of shield volcanoes. Volcanic vents within the locale show north–northwest–north–northeast-trending trends, which correspond to normal faults (where one side of the fault moves downward relative to the other) in the region, including one at the Bachelor chain's southern end. The Bachelor chain shows that much of the Quaternary Cascades in Oregon were produced in short bursts of eruptive activity and that mafic shield volcanoes can erupt at equal rates to stratovolcanoes. The volcanoes within the field are fed by shallow, compartmentalized magma chambers.

A stratovolcano (atop a shield volcano with a symmetrical shape), Mount Bachelor formed between 18,000 and 8,000 years ago. Bachelor is composed of basalt and basaltic andesite, and though its upper volcanic cone formed after its base shield, the two edifices show similar eruptive composition. The mountain has withstood very little alteration as a result of glacial erosion besides a small cirque (an amphitheatre-like valley formed by glacial erosion) on the northern side of the volcano. Despite the small scale of this erosion, it has extensively altered the northern face of Mount Bachelor, breaking down its lava into fine powder, particularly at the glacier terminus, where the terminal moraine resembles dust. However, the volcano's glacier has shrunk in recent decades and may vanish as a result of the warming climate. The volcano's summit has a number of clustered, northwest–southeast-trending vents, which erupted block lava flows made of basalt and andesite and only exhibited minor explosive eruptions, as little tephra can be found near the vents at the summit; there is also little pyroclastic rock. There is no summit crater.

Lava flows from Mount Bachelor's summit feature phenocrysts including clinopyroxene, olivine (more rare), and plagioclase, with two phases for the clinopyroxene featuring augite and pigeonite. Textures for these eruptive products vary from intersectal to intergranular, seriate to glomeroporphyritic to subophitic, and trachytic to non-aligned.

Bachelor last erupted between 10,000 and 8,000 years ago, and is entirely covered with Mazama Ash from the catastrophic eruption of Mount Mazama about 6,845 years ago. There is no geothermal activity at present, though some areas popularly thought to be fumaroles are caused by air movement through the porous structure. Several are near the top of the Pine Marten chairlift and occasionally present a hazard to skiers and snowboarders where the snow is undermined.

=== Subfeatures ===
Mount Bachelor is associated with a number of pyroclastic cones and shield volcanoes. Nearby cones include Dry Butte, Egan Cone, Katsuk Butte, Kwolh Butte, Lolah Butte, Lumrum Butte, Red Crater, Sheridan Mountain, Siah Butte, Talapus Butte, Three Trappers, and Tot Mountain. Shield volcanoes within the vicinity of Bachelor include Sheridan Mountain, Lookout Mountain, and Kwohl Butte.

== Eruptive history ==
The Mount Bachelor Chain has shown activity during the Pleistocene and the Holocene, mostly consisting of effusive eruptions with a small number of explosive eruptions yielding agglutinate in the form of spatter cones, volcanic bombs, and scoria. Within the Bachelor chain, mafic (rich in magnesium and iron) eruptive activity consisting mostly of lava flows and tephra fall took place over four discrete periods,^{[b]} beginning approximately 18,000 to 15,000 years ago as a Pleistocene glacier in the area began to retreat. During this first eruptive episode, the majority of activity occurred in the center of the chain, forming the Sheridan Mountain shield volcano. The first vents to erupt, subglacial volcanoes beneath an ice sheet west of Sparks Lake in the northwestern segment of the chain, interacted with water to produce violent explosive eruptions that ejected pyroclastic rock, which was deposited into the lakebed. Hyaloclastite deposits and thick lava flows with ice also formed in this area, along with the Talapus and Katsuk Buttes from scoria produced by later, milder Strombolian eruptions (which eject incandescent cinder, lapilli, and volcanic bombs).

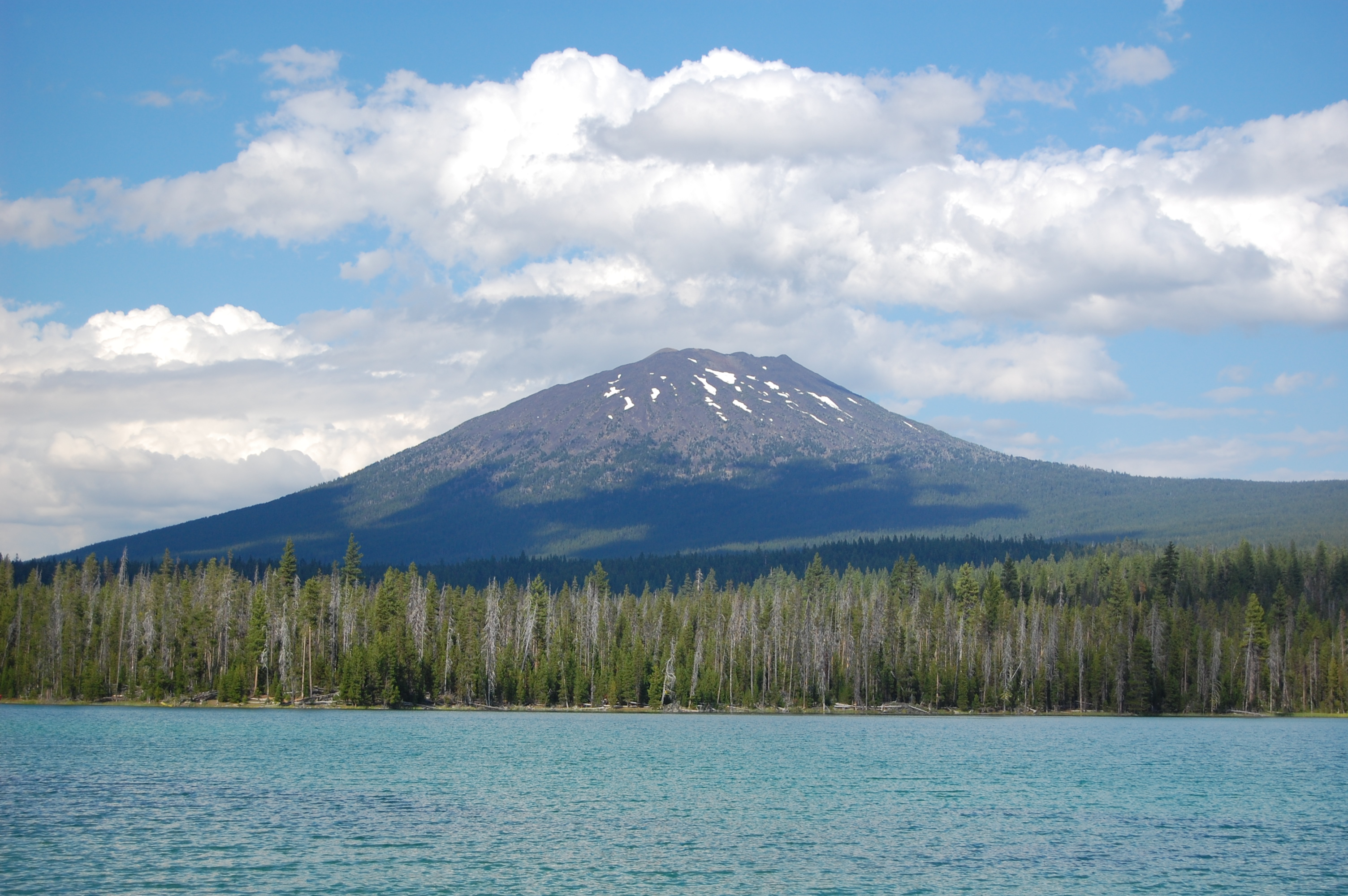
Mount Bachelor from Little Lava Lake (southwest of the mountain)

The second eruptive period consisted of explosive eruptions, which constructed scoria cones and lava flows to the south of Sheridan Mountain, known as the Siah Butte vents. These extend to the south end of the chain. The third period produced the shield volcano beneath Mount Bachelor out of basaltic andesite, later constructing its summit, in addition to a shield volcano that is topped by the Kwohl Butte. ʻAʻā lava erupted from Mount Bachelor during this third period coursed down its northern and northwestern sides. By 12,000 years ago, Mount Bachelor was close to its current size, as the oldest moraines from glaciers on the mountain (which are covered by lava flows from this third eruptive episode) can be dated to this time period. The current edifice at Mount Bachelor had been finished by about 10,000 years ago, followed by a gap in eruptive activity that lasted for 2,000 years. The latest eruptive activity within the chain yielded scoria cones and lava flows, including the Egan cone, which can be observed on Mount Bachelor's lower northern flank. Due to the presence of Mazama Ash on the northern side of the volcano, no eruptive activity is likely to have happened since 7,700 years ago.

In total, the Mount Bachelor chain has produced 9.6 cubic miles (40 km^{3}) of eruptive material, including Mount Bachelor's volume at 6.0 cubic miles (25 km^{3}). Stratigraphic and paleomagnetic studies suggest that Bachelor's volume was produced in as little as 1,500 years.

=== Potential hazards ===
Listed at a "moderate" threat level by the United States Geological Survey, Mount Bachelor poses little threat of becoming an active volcano in the near future. It may be part of a monogenetic volcanic field, meaning that the volcano only underwent one long series of eruptions before stopping activity altogether, but it may just be inactive, and it could erupt in the future. It remains unclear whether Mount Bachelor is merely dormant or completely extinct.

The Bachelor volcanic chain lies within a lava flow hazard zone that exists in central Oregon, and eruptions from this field of mafic volcanoes may produce eruptions of tephra and lava flows extending for 3 to 9 miles (4.8 to 14.5 km) from their source vents. Within areas 1.2 miles (1.9 km) of the vents, tephra may form deposits with thicknesses of up to 10 feet (3.0 m), though they only reach thicknesses of 4 inches (10 cm) at further distances beyond 6 miles (9.7 km). Because lava flows move slowly, they can be outmaneuvered by animals and humans, though they do pose a threat to streams and rivers, which they may dam or divert, leading to potential flood risks. If Mount Bachelor were to erupt, it would significantly affect the ski industry on the volcano, endangering visitors. An eruption from Mount Bachelor, the Three Sisters to the north, or another nearby vent in the Mount Bachelor Chain may be unlikely, but any would pose threats to the ski area.

== Human history ==
Mount Bachelor is so called because it "stands apart" from the Three Sisters, a group of three volcanic mountains that are northwest of Mount Bachelor. In early days Bachelor Butte was frequently called "Brother Jonathan", or "Mount Brother", but both eventually fell out of use.

Around the time of World War II, 90,000 soldiers were stationed to train at Camp Abbot near Bend. During the war, Bend's community depended on sawmills and agriculture, with a small ski area opening at Mount Bachelor in 1941. In 1950, the Shevlin-Hixon mill closed, leaving hundreds unemployed before it was re-expanded several years later. By 1958, the ski hill had grown into a ski resort, after the fundraising of start-up costs by the Bend Skyliners Mountaineering Club, with the installation of the first chair lift in 1962 and the attainment of a 30-year special use permit from the United States Forest Service. Expansion continued into the 1970s, with the ski area receiving 257,000 visitors between 1974 and 1975, and more than 500,000 between 1982 and 1983.

The resort developers were concerned that skiing on a butte might be perceived by consumers as "small-time" and so named their resort Mount Bachelor. Over time the popularity of the ski area led to the name Mount Bachelor coming into popular usage, and in a divided decision, the Oregon Geographic Names Board voted to change the name from Bachelor Butte to Mount Bachelor.

In the 1980s, struggles of the homebuilding and lumber industries meant that Deschutes County saw a 15 percent unemployment rate, but construction of a local mall, a chair to the top of Mount Bachelor, and the High Desert Museum helped the economy improve with time. In 2013, the United States Forest Service approved a new master plan for further development of the resort, including a mountain bike park, more chair lifts, more trails, a zip line, and improved lodge amenities.

The volcano's summit hosts the Mount Bachelor Observatory, located at an elevation of 9,000 feet (2,700 m) above sea level, and maintained by a research group at the University of Washington Bothell and the ski resort. Research at the observatory investigates long-range transport of pollution from the Asian continent, measuring chemical features of plumes that reach the Pacific Northwest.

== Recreation ==
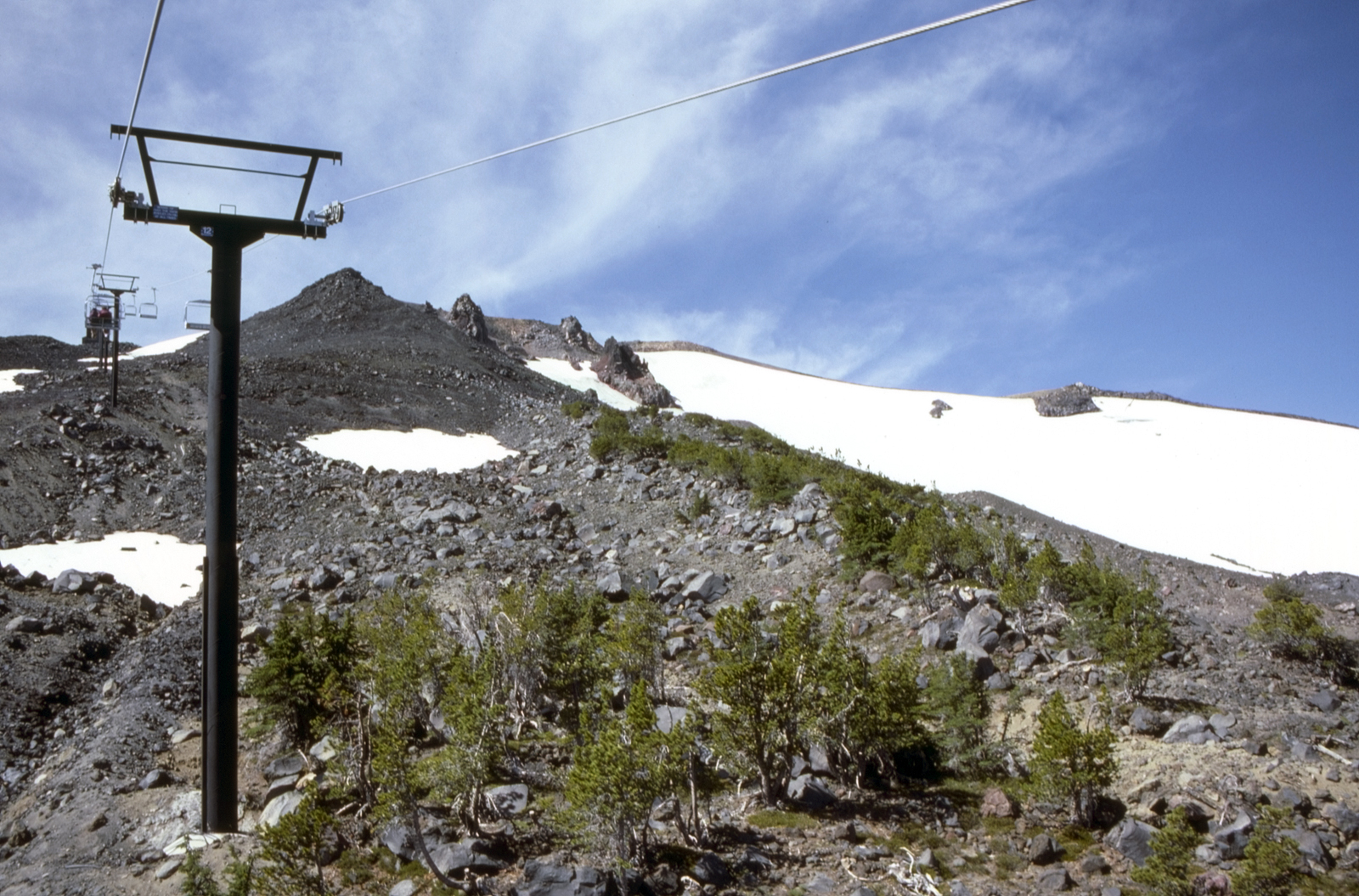
The chair lift to Mount Bachelor's summit, as seen in 1986

Mount Bachelor ski area operates a chairlift during the summer as well as during the ski season (weather permitting), making it the only major Cascade volcano with a chairlift to the summit. Nationally known, the resort is one of the largest in the Pacific Northwest with a skiable area of 3,683 acres (14.9 km^{2}) and a vertical drop of 3,365 feet (1,026 m), in addition to six terrain parks. The resort represents a center of winter recreational activities within Deschutes County, operating within the Deschutes National Forest and partnering with the United States Forest Service to offer activities while preserving the Oregon Cascades and the forest area. The resort offers interpretive tours with a naturalist on local flora and fauna, in addition to snowshoeing, snowboarding, snow tubing, dog sledding, and department stores. During the summer, fishing is a popular activity in the local lakes and streams, as is hiking and camping.

Climbing to the top of Mount Bachelor follows a trail that begins at an elevation of 6,300 feet (1,900 m) and gains 2,765 feet (843 m) to reach the summit. A single-track trail, it traverses over lava from the volcano, which appears in jagged formations. The volcano's summit offers views of the rest of the Mount Bachelor chain to the south, in addition to Lookout Mountain, the Three Sisters, Mount Jefferson, Mount Hood, and Mount Adams in Washington state.

== Notes ==
- [a] Other sources list the elevation at 9,065 feet (2,763 m).
- [b] Hildreth (2007) mentions five eruptive periods.

== Sources ==
- Gardner, C. A. (1994). Temporal, spatial and petrologic variations of lava flows from the Mount Bachelor volcanic chain, central Oregon High Cascades: Open-File Report 94-261. United States Geological Survey.
- Harris, S. L. (2005). "Chapter 13: The Three Sisters". Fire Mountains of the West: The Cascade and Mono Lake Volcanoes (Third ed.). Missoula, Montana: Mountain Press Publishing Company. ISBN 978-0-87842-511-2.
- Hildreth, W. (2007). Quaternary Magmatism in the Cascades, Geologic Perspectives. United States Geological Survey. Professional Paper 1744.
- Hildreth, W.; Fierstein, J.; Calvert, A. T. (2012). Geologic map of Three Sisters volcanic cluster, Cascade Range, Oregon: U.S. Geological Survey Scientific Investigations Map 3186, pamphlet. United States Geological Survey.
- Holyoak, D. (2003). Ski North America: The Ultimate Travel Guide. Firefly Books. ISBN 978-1552978283.
- Joslin, L. (2005). The Wilderness Concept and the Three Sisters Wilderness: Deschutes and Willamette National Forests, Oregon. Bend, Oregon: Wilderness Associates. ISBN 978-0-9647167-4-2.
- Manwill, B. (2016). Day Hiking Bend & Central Oregon: Mount Jefferson/ Sisters/ Cascade Lakes. Mountaineers Books. ISBN 978-1594859342.
- McArthur, Lewis A.; McArthur, Lewis L. (2003) [1928]. Oregon Geographic Names (Seventh ed.). Portland, Oregon: Oregon Historical Society Press. ISBN 978-0-87595-277-2.
- Peterson, N. V.; Groh, E. A.; Taylor, E. M.; Stensland, D. E. (1976). "Geology and mineral resources of Deschutes County Oregon". Oregon Department of Geology and Mineral Industries Bulletin. 89. Oregon Department of Geology and Mineral Industries: 1–62.
- Plummer, Charles C.; McGeary, David (1988). Physical Geology (4th ed.). Dubuque, Iowa: Wm. C. Brown Publishers. ISBN 978-0-697-05092-2.
- Riddick, S. N.; Schmidt, D. A. (2011). "Time-dependent changes in volcanic inflation rate near Three Sisters, Oregon, revealed by InSAR". Geochemistry, Geophysics, Geosystems. 12 (12): n/a. Bibcode:2011GGG....1212005R. doi:10.1029/2011GC003826. S2CID 134308941.
- Scott, W. E.; Gardner, C. A. (September 1990). "Field trip guide to the central Oregon High Cascades Part 1: Mount Bachelor-South Sister area". Oregon Geology. 52 (5). Oregon Department of Geology and Mineral Industries.
- Wood, C. A.; Kienle, J., eds. (1992). Volcanoes of North America: United States and Canada. Cambridge, England: Cambridge University Press. ISBN 978-0-521-43811-7.
