= North Big Bosom Butte =

Mountain in Washington (state), United States

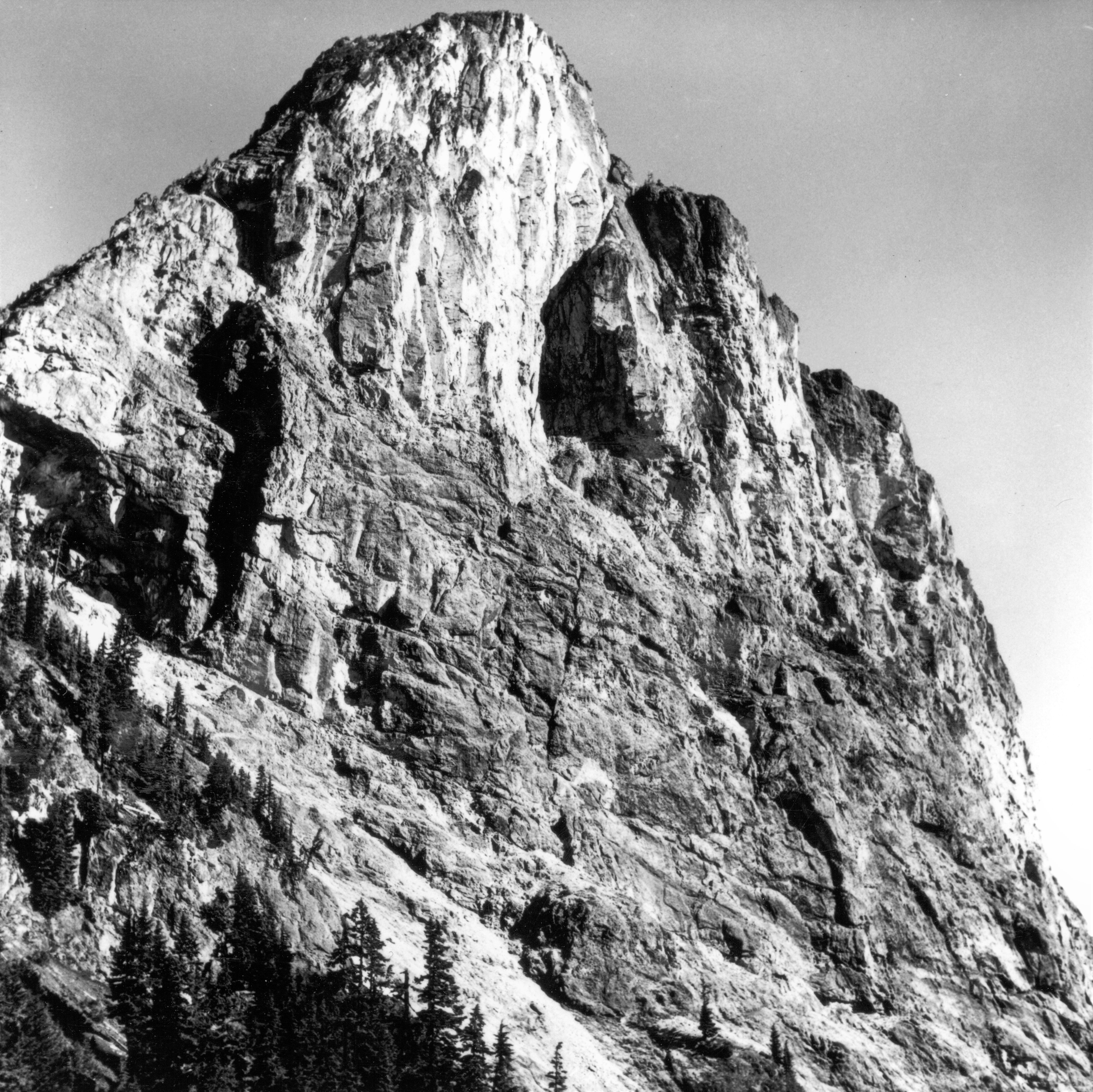
- North Big Bosom Butte, circa 1966

Highest point
- Elevation: 6,384 ft (1,946 m)
- Prominence: 824 ft (251 m)
- Parent peak: South Big Bosom Butte (6,521 ft)
- Isolation: 0.58 mi (0.93 km)
- Coordinates: 48°57′34″N 121°35′17″W

Geography
- Location within Washington (state) Location within the United States
- Interactive map of North Big Bosom Butte
- Country: United States
- State: Washington
- County: Whatcom
- Protected area: Mount Baker Wilderness
- Parent range: Cascade Range; North Cascades; Skagit Range
- Topo map: USGS Mount Sefrit

Geology
- Rock type: breccia

Climbing
- First ascent: 1984

North Big Bosom Butte is a 6,384-foot (1,946-metre) mountain summit located in Whatcom County of Washington state.

== Description ==
North Big Bosom Butte is part of the Skagit Range, which is a subset of the North Cascades. It is situated 2.5 miles south of the Canada–United States border in the Mount Baker Wilderness, on land managed by Mount Baker-Snoqualmie National Forest. Its nearest higher neighbor is South Big Bosom Butte 0.6 mi (0.97 km) to the south, Mount Larrabee is three miles to the northwest, and Pocket Peak is set 2.5 mi (4.0 km) to the northeast. Precipitation runoff from this mountain drains into Silesia Creek, which is a tributary of the Chilliwack River. Topographic relief is significant as the summit rises 3,900 feet (1,200 meters) above the creek in one mile.

== History ==
The Big Bosom Buttes were named by geologist Rowland Tabor, who with Doug McKeever, made the first ascent of the south butte in 1967. Surveyors made a helicopter landing on the north butte prior to 1955, but the first ascent of the north butte was made September 28, 1984, by John Roper and Mark Allaback.

== Climate ==
North Big Bosom Butte is located in the marine west coast climate zone of western North America. Weather fronts originating in the Pacific Ocean travel northeast toward the Cascade Mountains. As fronts approach the North Cascades, they are forced upward by the peaks of the Cascade Range (orographic lift), causing them to drop their moisture in the form of rain or snowfall onto the Cascades. As a result, the west side of the North Cascades experiences high precipitation, especially during the winter months in the form of snowfall. Because of maritime influence, snow tends to be wet and heavy, resulting in high avalanche danger. During winter months, weather is usually cloudy, but due to high pressure systems over the Pacific Ocean that intensify during summer months, there is often little or no cloud cover during the summer. Due to its temperate climate and proximity to the Pacific Ocean, areas west of the Cascade Crest very rarely experience temperatures below 0 °F (−18 °C) or above 80 °F (27 °C). The months July through September offer the most favorable weather for viewing or climbing this peak.

== Geology ==
The butte is made up of volcanic breccia of the Hannegan Pass Volcanics. The North Cascades features some of the most rugged topography in the Cascade Range with craggy peaks, ridges, and deep glacial valleys. Geological events occurring many years ago created the diverse topography and drastic elevation changes over the Cascade Range leading to the various climate differences.

The history of the formation of the Cascade Mountains dates back millions of years ago to the late Eocene Epoch. With the North American Plate overriding the Pacific Plate, episodes of volcanic igneous activity persisted. The peak has its own surrounding extinct caldera. In addition, small fragments of the oceanic and continental lithosphere called terranes created the North Cascades about 50 million years ago.

During the Pleistocene period dating back over two million years ago, glaciation advancing and retreating repeatedly scoured the landscape leaving deposits of rock debris. The U-shaped cross section of the river valleys is a result of recent glaciation. Uplift and faulting in combination with glaciation have been the dominant processes which have created the tall peaks and deep valleys of the North Cascades area.

== Gallery ==
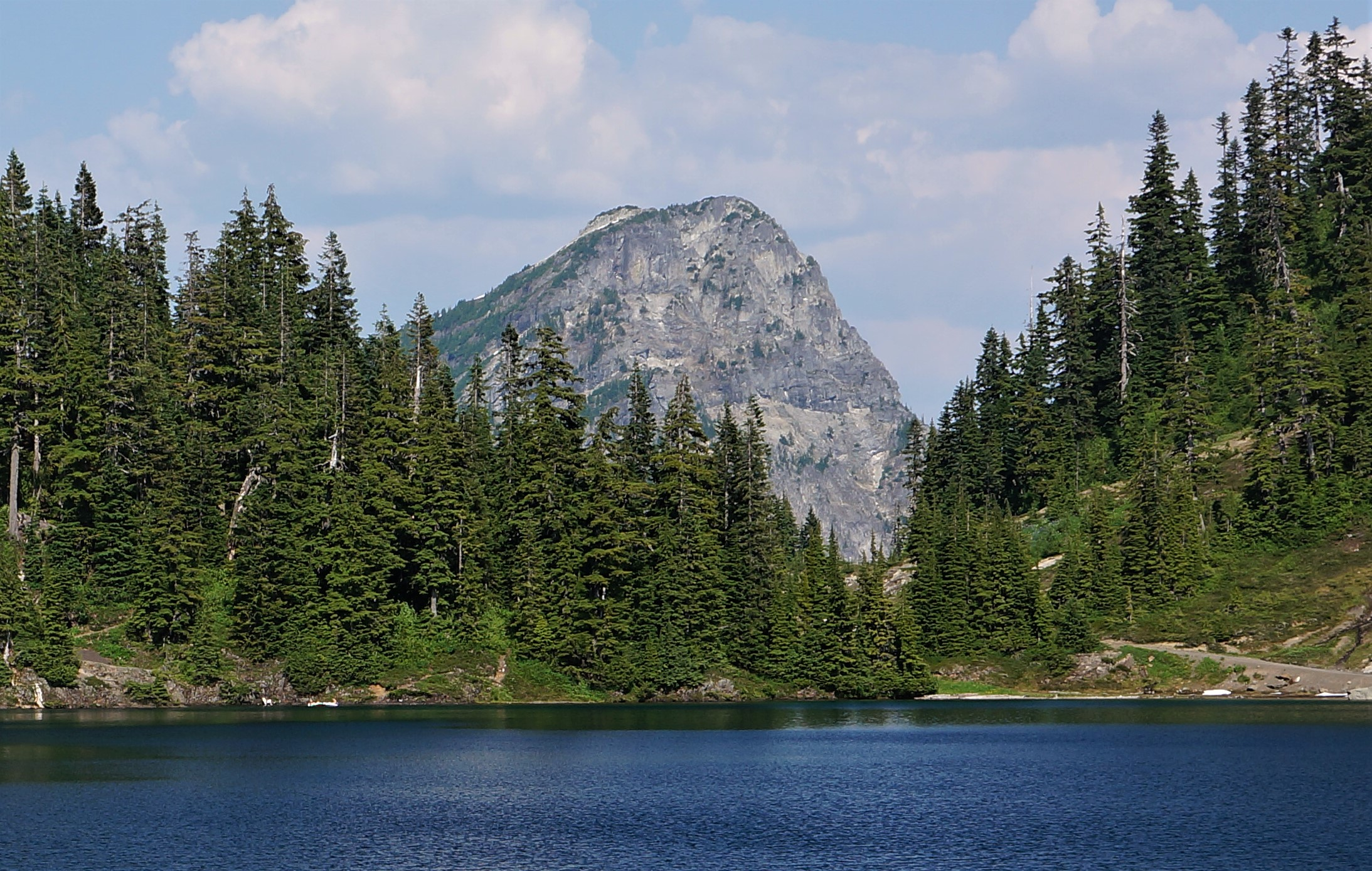
West aspect viewed from Twin Lakes

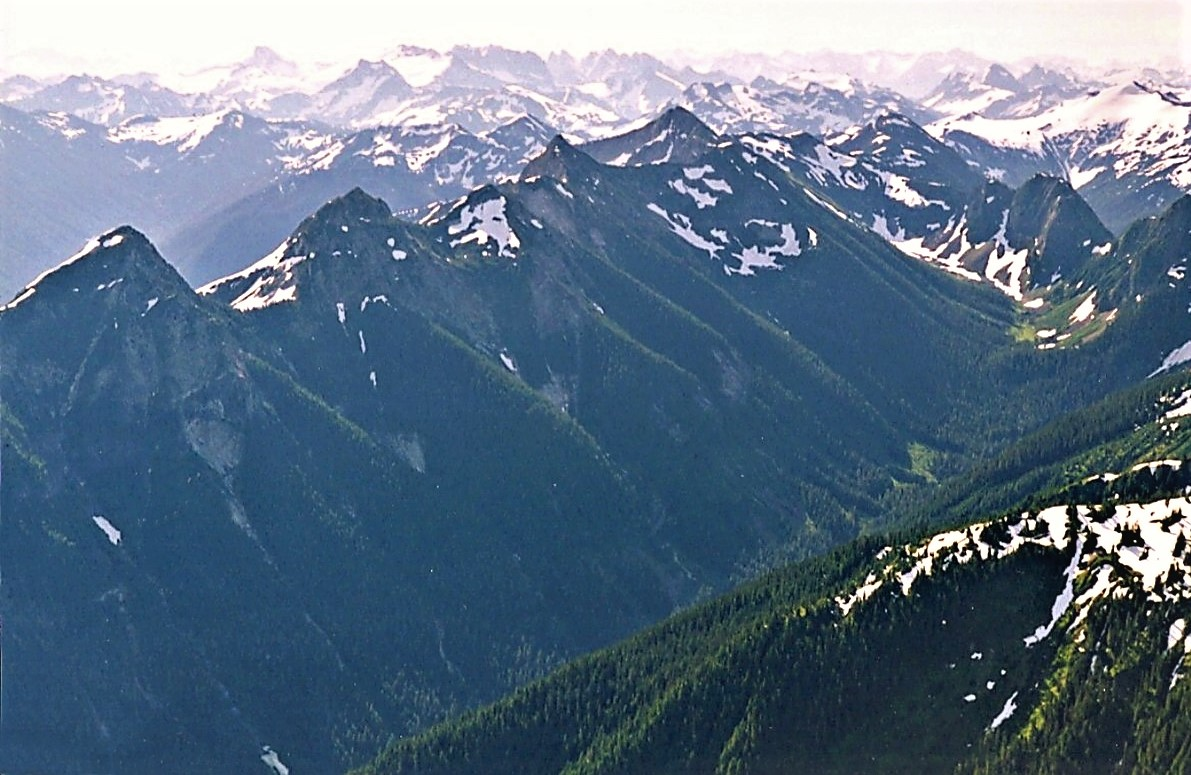
North Big Bosom Butte (furthest left) seen from Mount Larrabee

== See also ==
- Geology of the Pacific Northwest
- Geography of the North Cascades
