= Lolah Butte =

Summit in Deschutes County, Oregon, US

Coordinates: 43.8423396°N 121.6678074°W

Lolah Butte is a summit in Deschutes County, Oregon, in the United States. With an elevation of 5,190 feet (1,580 m), Lolah Butte is the 1258th highest summit in the state of Oregon.

Lolah is a name most likely derived from Chinook Jargon, meaning "round" or "complete".
