= Tumalo Volcanic Center =

Source of large-volume Pleistocene ashflows in Oregon, United States

Highest point
- Elevation: 1,955 ft (596 m)
- Coordinates: 44°05′56″N 121°32′28″W

Geography
- Parent range: Cascade Range

Geology
- Rock age: More than 500,000 years
- Volcanic arc: Cascade Volcanic Arc
- Last eruption: Pleistocene

The Tumalo volcanic center of Central Oregon is viewed as a source of large-volume Pleistocene ashflows, in the US state of Oregon.

== The eruption, ashflows included ==
The volcanic eruption released a volume of lava equivalent to a cube 1.5 miles (2.4 km) long by 1.5 miles (2.4 km) wide by 1.5 miles (2.4 km) high.

Ashflows include:

1. Desert Spring Tuff
2. Bend Pumice
3. Tumalo Tuff, and
4. Shevlin Park Tuff

The area has many rhyolitic domes, such as Melvin Butte, plus andesitic cinder cones, including those of the Triangle Hill and Triangle Peak area, whose composition is similar to the Tumalo Tuff (and Bend Pumice), and Shevlin Park Tuff.

This area has andesitic and mafic cinder cones, such as Lava Butte. and rhyolite domes. Viscous rhyolite domes extruded to the surface.

== Ways the Tumalo Volcanic Center's ashflows have been used ==
The Tumalo Volcanic Center's ashy pumice was quarried for concrete. This concrete effectively built the city of Bend, Oregon

Pumice from the Tumalo Volcanic Center composes Oregon State University–Cascades's expansion, into a pumice mine.

== See also ==
- Tumalo Mountain

== External links and references ==
- Volcanocafe, has information about the Tumalo Volcanic Center
- Information on Tumalo Volcanic Center's vent
