= Telephone and Data Systems =

American telecommunications service company

Telephone and Data Systems, Inc.
- Company type: Public
- Traded as: NYSE: TDS; S&P 600 component
- Industry: Communications services
- Founded: 1969; 57 years ago
- Headquarters: 30 North LaSalle; Chicago, Illinois, U.S.
- Key people: Walter Carlson (president & CEO and Chair)
- Products: Local wireline and wireless telecommunication services, Internet services
- Revenue: ▼$4.964 billion USD (2024, prior to wireless sale)
- Subsidiaries: TDS Telecom; Array Digital Infrastructure
- ASN: 4181
- Website: www.tdsinc.com

Telephone and Data Systems, Inc. is an American telecommunications service company primarily providing broadband, cable, telephone, and wireless services, and radio tower leasing, through its subsidiaries TDS Telecom and Array Digital Infrastructure, the latter of which was formerly the cell phone company United States Cellular.

The company began as a group of rural phone companies in Wisconsin in 1969. In 1983 it founded U.S. Cellular as a subsidiary. In 2001, it acquired Straus Printing Company and combined it with a previously acquired printing company, Suttle Press, to form Suttle-Straus as another subsidiary.

LeRoy T. Carlson, the founder of TDS, died in May 2016 at the age of 100.

In 2024 TDS sold OneNeck, a managed services and regional data center company, to US Signal, a portfolio company of Igneo Infrastructure Partners.

In August 2025, United States Cellular Corporation sold its cellular/wireless business and much of its radio spectrum rights to T-Mobile USA, but kept ownership of its approximately 4,400 radio towers, with T-Mobile signing 15-year leases to remain a tenant on at least 2,600 of the towers. At the same time, USCC changed its corporate name to Array Digital Infrastructure, Inc., but remained publicly traded, with its stock ticker symbol changing from USM to AD in the same month, and TDS holding 81% ownership of Array.
