= Diablo, Washington =

Unincorporated community in Washington, US

- Unincorporated community
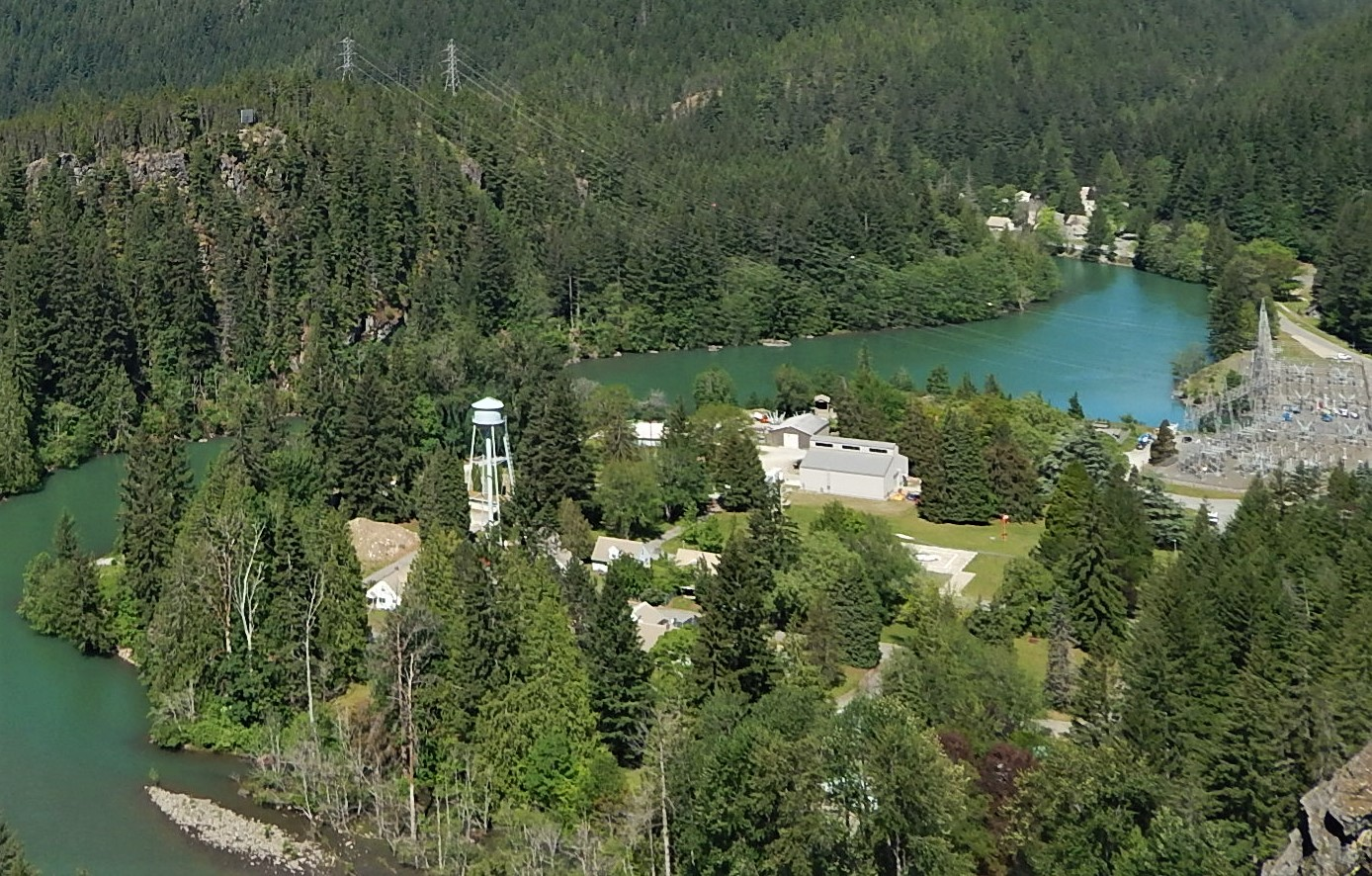
- Diablo, Washington

- Location within Washington (state)
- Coordinates: 48°42′48″N 121°08′28″W
- Country: United States
- State: Washington
- County: Whatcom

Government
  - Type: Company town
  - Company: Seattle City Light

Area
  - Total: 69 acres (28 ha)
- Elevation: 896 ft (273 m)
- Time zone: UTC-8 (Pacific (PST))
  - Summer (DST): UTC-7 (PDT)
- ZIP Code: 98283
- Area code(s): 360, 564
- GNIS feature ID: 1518740

Diablo is an unincorporated community in Whatcom County, Washington, United States. It is located near Diablo Dam in the Ross Lake National Recreation Area, along the Skagit River. The community was established as a company town in the late 1920s by Seattle City Light to support the construction of Diablo Dam, one of three major dams that form the Skagit River Hydroelectric Project. Seattle City Light continues to maintain operations in Diablo, but now works with the National Park Service and the North Cascades Institute to offer educational and recreational opportunities within the area.

The town has two sections; these are known as Hollywood (formerly Cedar Bar) and Reflector Bar, which are connected by a single access road. Between the two areas lies the Diablo Dam powerhouse and an electrical substation. Diablo does not have a post office; it is considered part of Rockport, Washington, for postal purposes. The town is accessible via Washington State Route 20 and is approximately 30 miles (50 km) northeast of Rockport.

Diablo takes its name from Diablo Canyon, which early prospectors and miners named, either for the difficulty of traversing it, or after a landmark in the American Southwest. Today, Diablo is known for its proximity to recreational destinations such as Diablo Lake, and for the many trails, campgrounds, and historic sites in the area.

== History ==
Before European settlers arrived, the area around Diablo was populated by the Kwabatsabsh people—now part of the Upper Skagit Indian Tribe. Interviews with members of the Upper Skagit have helped discover the dates of past disasters, such as a flood in 1815.

Reflector Bar, a river bar, is located at the confluence of the Skagit River and Stetattle Creek, and may have held importance to the tribe. While it is generally accepted the word Stetattle means "barrier" or "boundary" in the native language, the reason for the creek's name is unclear. According to C. H. Park, a United States Forest Service supervisor in 1926, the location may have marked the boundary between the Kwabatsabsh people's territory and that of other tribes to the north, while a 1941 guidebook interprets Stetattle as referring to the area as a boundary between worlds, above which lies the world of ghosts in Indigenous oral tradition. This latter interpretation is attested in several other publications.

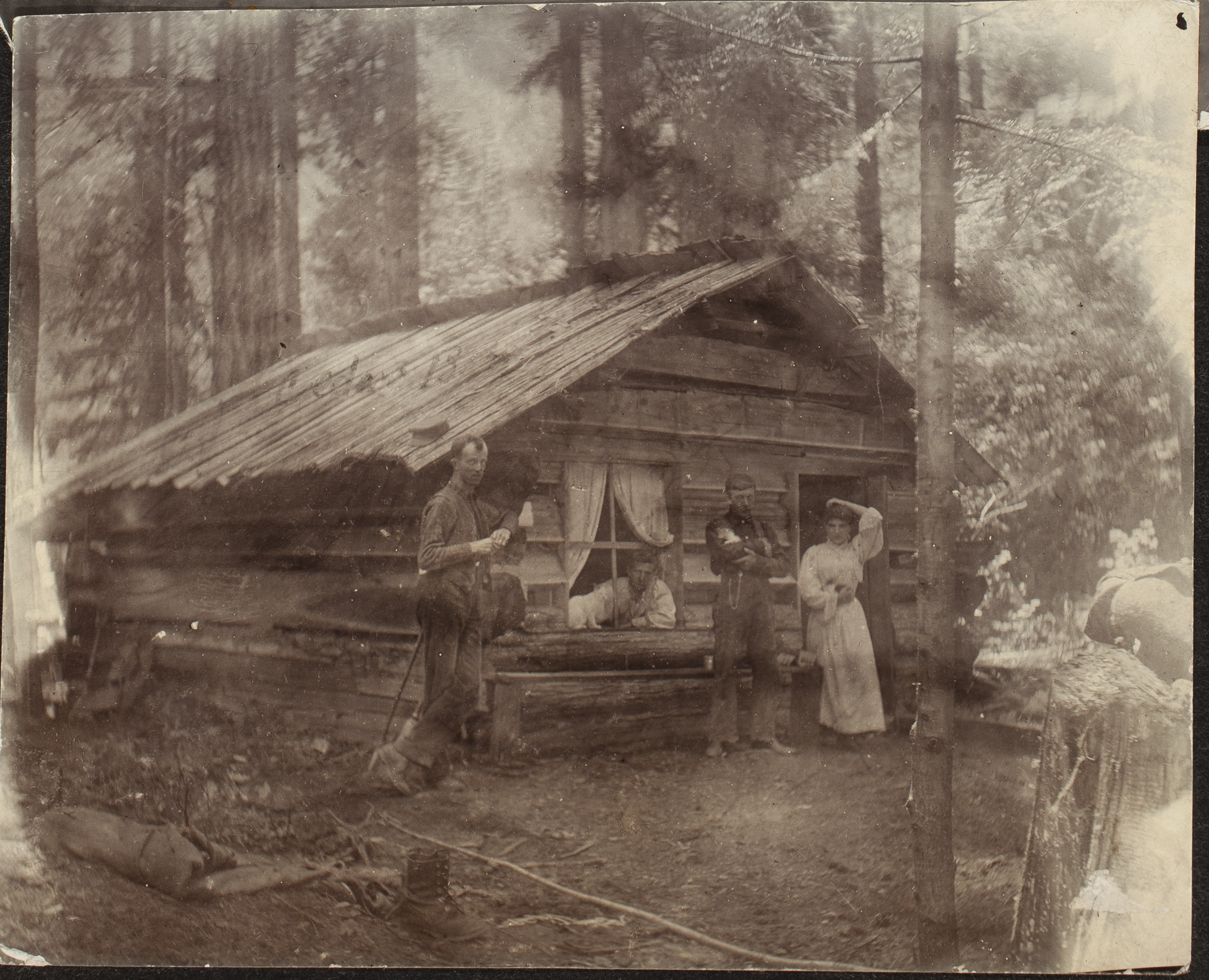
The first house at Cedar Bar, constructed by Lucinda Davis.

Lucinda Davis and her children claimed a homestead at Cedar Bar, near the modern-day site of Diablo, in June 1898. At the time, the area was accessible only via a notoriously difficult and dangerous overland trail from Newhalem. The Davis family opened an inn that served hundreds of local miners, forest rangers, and hunters. Their inn had modern amenities, including electricity and a radio, which was unusual for a remote location at the time. In 1904, the Reaburn climbing party renamed the previously named Stetattle Peak to Davis Peak in honor of the Davis family.

Under the Forest Homestead Act of 1906, the United States Forest Service reevaluated the validity of the Davis family's claim to Cedar Bar. The Forest Service reduced their original claim of 100 acres (40 ha), and proposed 40 acres (16 ha) for a ranger station and other uses. In 1910, the Davis family's claim was submitted for a federal land patent, and title papers granting them ownership were signed in 1917. In the same year, Frank Davis built the Sourdough Mountain Lookout, which was replaced by the Civilian Conservation Corps (CCC) in 1933. At the time, the CCC had a team of 18 men living in Reflector Bar.

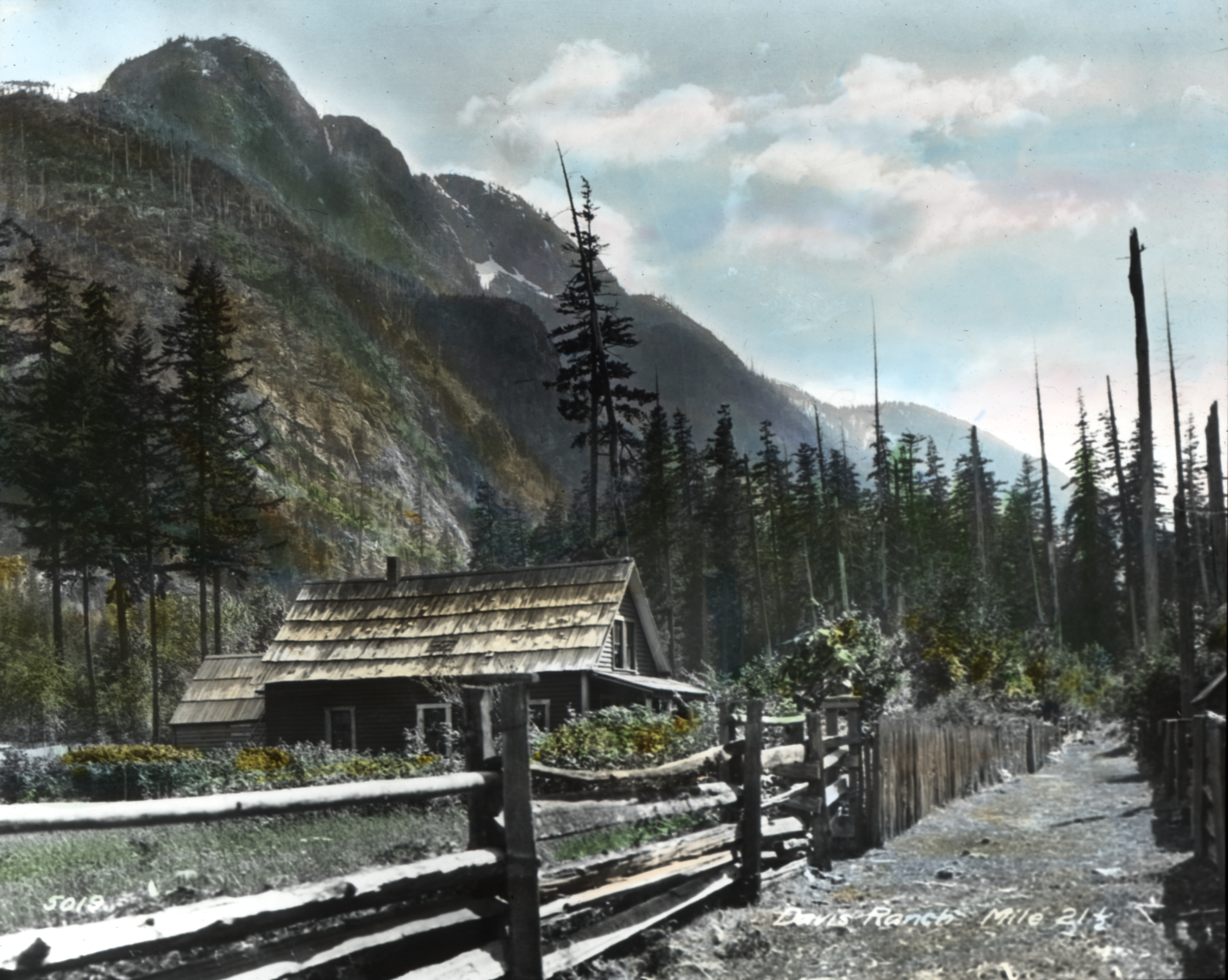
Davis Ranch (1919)

In the 1920s, Seattle City Light (also known as City Light) began to show interest in the area's potential for hydroelectric generation, and by 1928, it had started condemnation proceedings. In 1929, following site surveys and expansions of the dam project that led to the Davis family losing their land, the family moved to Sedro-Woolley. City Light later honored the family by constructing a replica of their power station, including the original waterwheel.

=== Reflector Bar ===
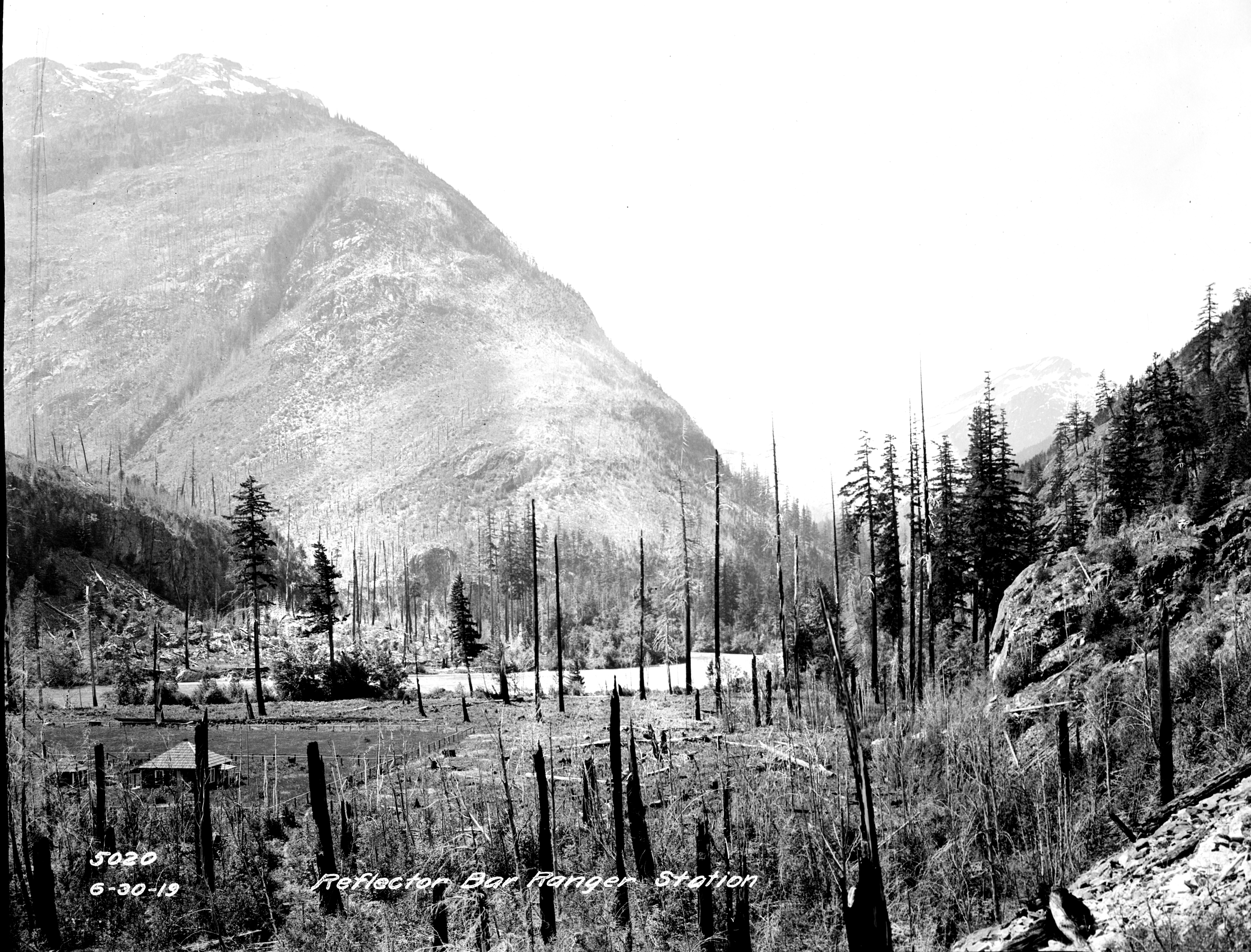
Ranger station at Reflector Bar. (1919)

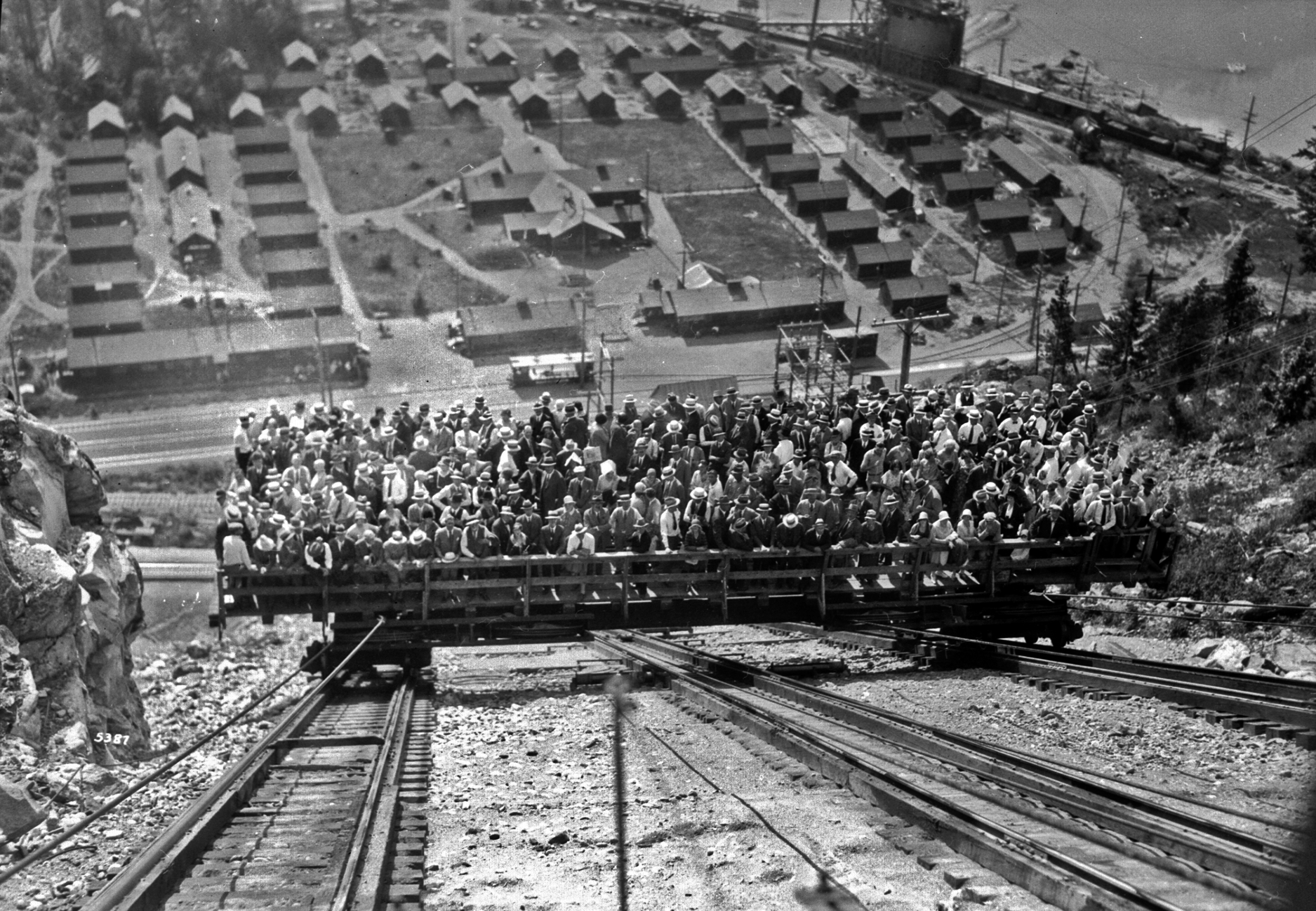
Tourists on inclined railway, Reflector Bar visible in back. (1930)

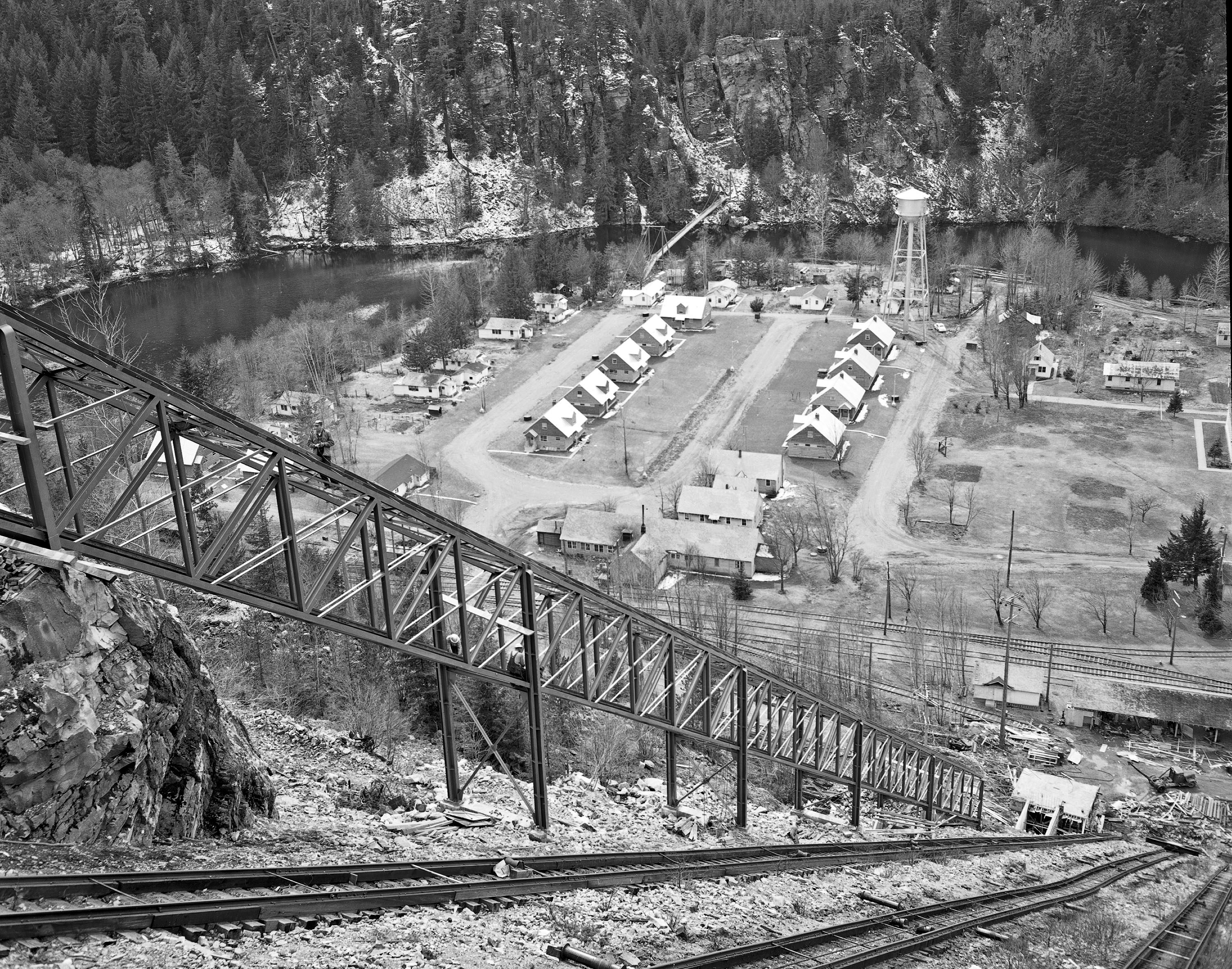
View from top of inclined railway. (1954)

Reflector Bar, a river bar named for the small reflector shelter built there, was the site of the Forest Service ranger station. In 1927, the Forest Service allowed City Light to occupy the area. In late 1927 or early 1928, a railroad bridge was built over Stetattle Creek, connecting the line from Reflector Bar to Newhalem. The rails were electrified, although a steam engine was brought in to climb the steep slope.

By 1928, Reflector Bar had many buildings arranged in a U-shape with a mess hall in the center. There were numerous cottages and ten larger, four-room houses were built for the dam project's upper management. Amenities included a tennis court, a small zoo, and a swimming pool.

In 1932, two years after the dam was completed, many of the buildings were demolished. The powerhouse for the dam still needed to be constructed, so for a time, Reflector Bar housed a 300-ton crane manufactured by the Harnischfeger Corporation. In 1934, a water tower—a prominent town landmark today—was built, and the mess hall was converted into a commissary, carpenter's shop, store room, and recreational hall.

In 1942, Reflector Bar may have been designated as an Aircraft Warning Service site, though it may have never been used. By the 1970s, most of the buildings had been demolished and replaced with lawns, despite earlier plans to turn the area into a wild garden.

=== Hollywood ===
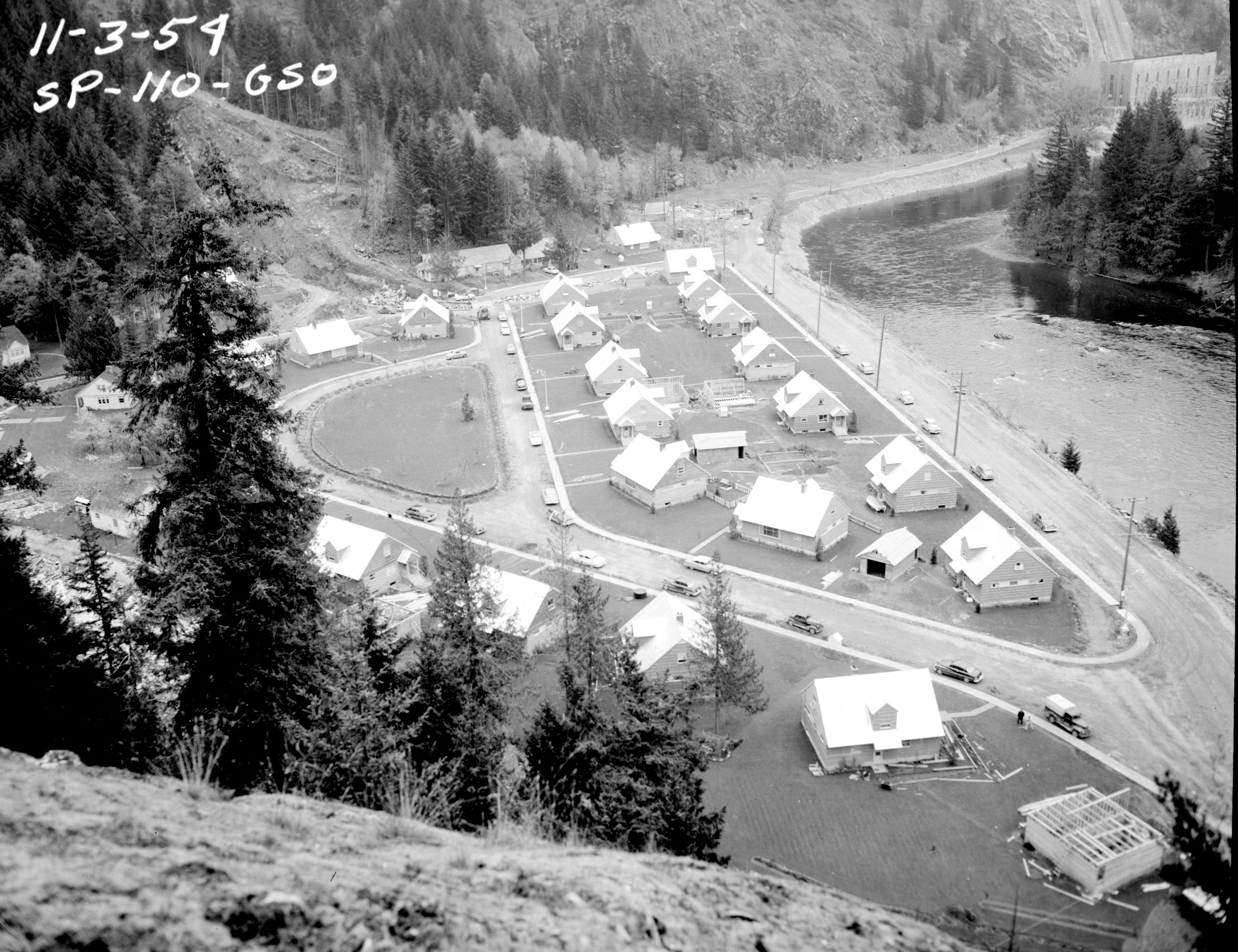
General view of Hollywood. (1954)

The former location of the Davis ranch was renamed from Cedar Bar to Hollywood. In the mid-1920s, around 20 shacks were scattered throughout Hollywood; the Davis family may have built these to rent to employees before the condemnation of their land. In 1935, a building was donated for use as a school for eight children. A larger school was built in 1946, due to a population increase during the construction of Ross Dam. The building still stands, and has been converted into a dining hall, visitor center, and museum.

In response to complaints from employees about the crude construction of the buildings and the lack of sewer or water connections, City Light built five more houses and an apartment for ten people in 1938. By that time, only five of the original 1920s shacks still stood. In 1952, it was decided 36 new buildings were to be built—11 in Reflector Bar and the rest in Hollywood. The plan to build 60 new buildings was scaled down after it was determined the old buildings could be kept. Only one of the houses built in 1938 survived.

The Diablo area has a history of flooding dating to at least 1815, and after a particularly difficult winter of floods leading into 1950, City Light raised the lower areas of Hollywood to an elevation of 890 feet (270 m). This was done to alleviate flood damage and to prepare for the new Gorge Dam being built downstream. Also at this time, the original 1920s shacks were demolished to make way for redevelopment. The redevelopment and regrading of the Hollywood area in the 1950s created much of the modern-day neighborhood. During redevelopment work, railroad tracks were removed, rail bridges were paved over, roads were regraded and repaved, 28 new houses were built, sewer and water systems were updated, and sidewalks and street lights were installed.

=== Modern-day Diablo ===
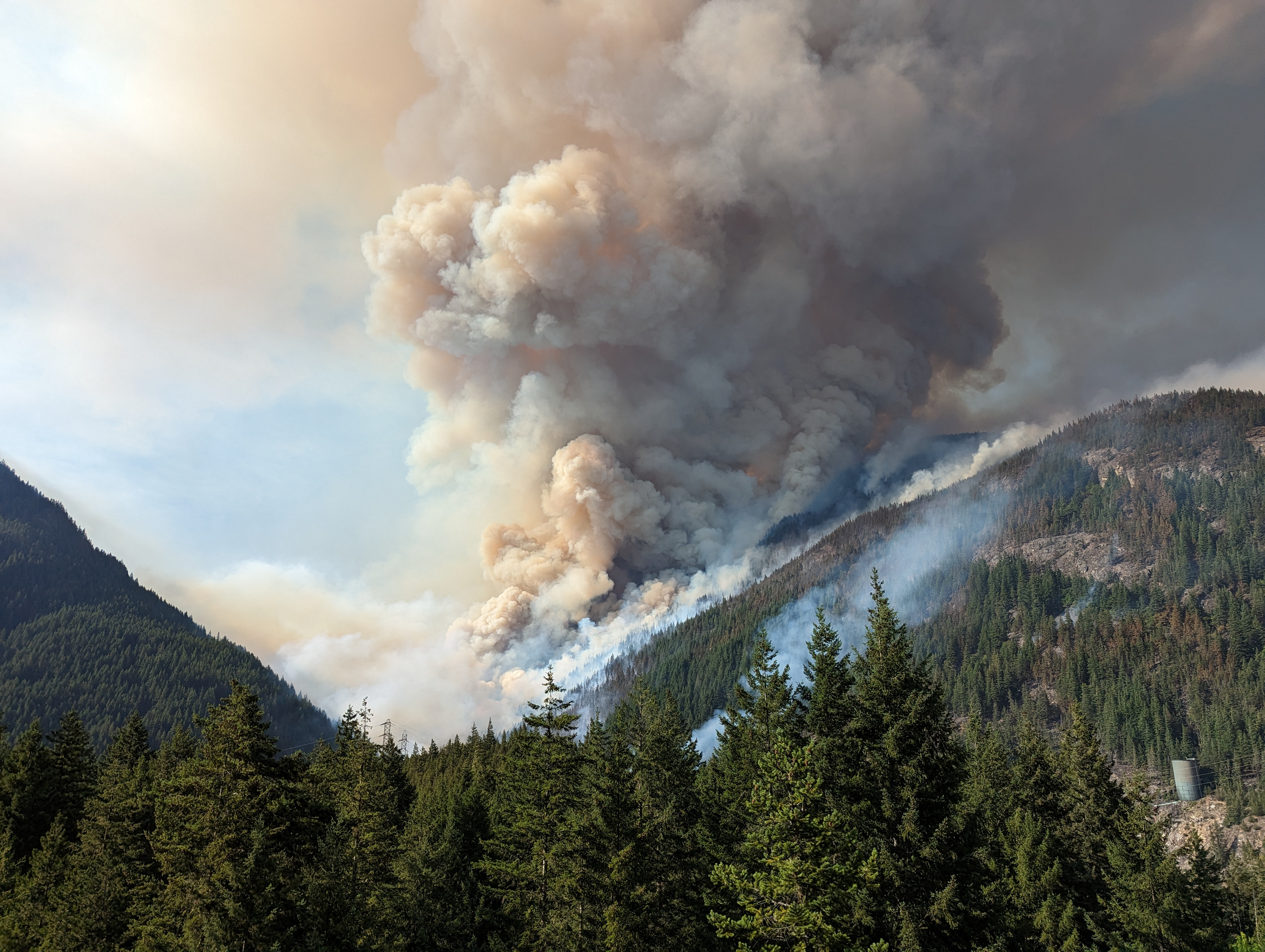
The Sourdough Fire from Pyramid Lake Trailhead near Diablo. (2023)

In 1972, City Light decided to automate its dams, leading to the relocation of most residents and the retention of only a few essential employees. The town remains under City Light control, but is now used to house employees of the National Park Service, and those of the North Cascades Institute who run the nearby North Cascades Environmental Learning Center. City Light and the National Park Service together maintain trails in and around Diablo.

In 1996, the Skagit River Hydroelectric Project historic district was created, which included many buildings in Diablo, and in 2011 the district was expanded and more buildings were added, encompassing most of the town. From July 29 to October 1, 2023, the Sourdough Fire caused the evacuation of any residents, the closure of Diablo, the North Cascades Highway (State Route 20), recreational facilities, and the three dams in the area.

== Geography ==
Seattle City Light established the community of Diablo as a company town to support the construction of Diablo Dam and other dams as part of the Skagit River Hydroelectric Project. Diablo consists of two parts—Reflector Bar upstream and Hollywood (Cedar Bar) downstream. The two parts are connected by a road, that was formerly a rail line before it was paved over. Hollywood was the primary residential area and mostly contains residential buildings. The Reflector Bar area has maintenance buildings, an inclined railway, a water tower, a helipad, and a few houses. Most buildings in Diablo are now empty. The Diablo Dam powerhouse and substation are located between the two areas. Land in Hollywood remains owned by City Light, while the United States Forest Service manages land in Reflector Bar.

The settlement is 38 miles (61 km) east of Concrete, the nearest significant town, on State Route 20, which is also known as the North Cascades Highway. The nearest significant town east of Diablo is Winthrop, which is 68 miles (109 km) away.

=== Topography ===
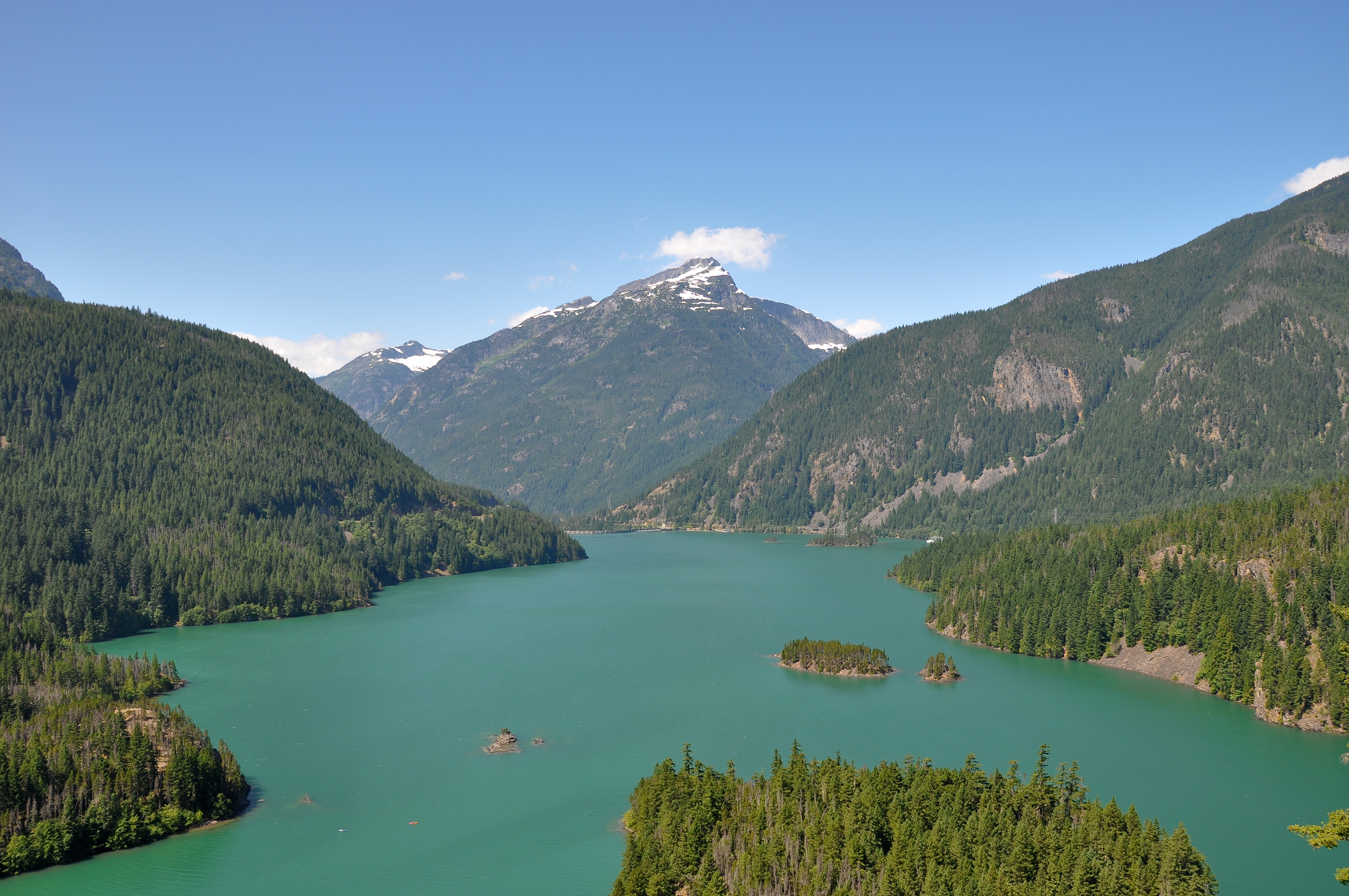
Diablo Lake with Davis Peak in the background.

Diablo is located in the upper Skagit River valley in Whatcom County, which lies in the North Cascades of northern Washington. The community occupies two adjacent alluvial river bars; Reflector Bar to the south and Cedar Bar (Hollywood) to the north. These river bars comprise some of the only relatively flat, geologically stable, and buildable areas in the region. Diablo lies at the center of a narrow, 10-mile (16 km) canyon that was formed by the Skagit River, and by repeated advances and retreats of the Puget Lobe of the Cordilleran Ice Sheet. One theory about the canyon's formation says the upper Skagit once drained northward into Canada. The growth and retreat of successive Cordilleran ice flows brought about a reversal in the river's direction. Each advance blocked the river, forcing it to find new routes to the south, and carving deep gorges. According to this theory, the Skagit gorge was so deep the river continued flowing southward after the Cordilleran ice disappeared.

Diablo sits at an elevation of 896 feet (273 m), which is comparatively low compared to nearby landforms such as Diablo Lake, a reservoir impounded by Diablo Dam at 1,201 feet (366 m) above sea level, and nearby Cascades peaks that exceed 7,000 feet (2,100 m).

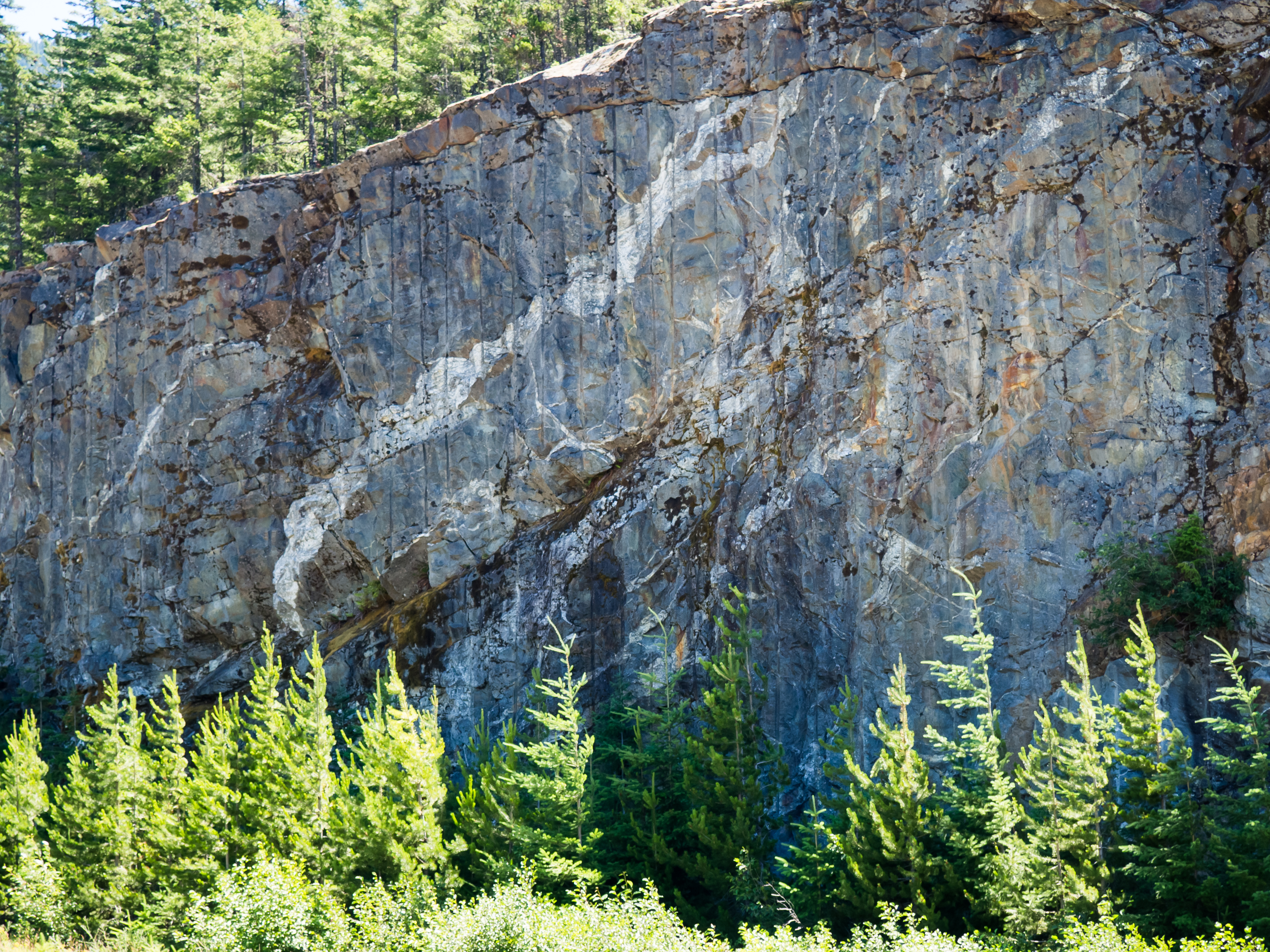
An example of Skagit Gneiss at the Diablo Lake Overlook.

The regional bedrock is predominantly the Skagit Gneiss Complex, a high-grade, metamorphic suite of orthogneiss, paragneiss, and related migmatitic rocks that form the crystalline core of the North Cascades. The resistant nature of Skagit Gneiss has influenced local landforms by guiding patterns of valley incision and ridge formation, and contributing to the supply of glacial flour, fine sediments that give Diablo Lake its characteristic turquoise hue when suspended in glacial meltwater.

=== Climate ===
The Western Regional Climate Center (WRCC) has reported weather station 452157 at Diablo Dam since 1948. It is presently at 48°42′51″N 121°08′35″W with an elevation of 891 feet (272 m).

Climate data for Diablo, Washington (Diablo Dam) 1991–2020, extremes 1914–present
Month	Jan	Feb	Mar	Apr	May	Jun	Jul	Aug	Sep	Oct	Nov	Dec	Year
Record high °F (°C)	62 (17)	63 (17)	76 (24)	90 (32)	103 (39)	110 (43)	106 (41)	106 (41)	101 (38)	87 (31)	65 (18)	59 (15)	110 (43)
Mean maximum °F (°C)	48.4 (9.1)	52.7 (11.5)	63.7 (17.6)	75.9 (24.4)	86.4 (30.2)	90.8 (32.7)	95.6 (35.3)	94.8 (34.9)	88.4 (31.3)	72.7 (22.6)	55.1 (12.8)	48.5 (9.2)	98.3 (36.8)
Mean daily maximum °F (°C)	38.5 (3.6)	43.2 (6.2)	49.0 (9.4)	57.2 (14.0)	66.1 (18.9)	70.3 (21.3)	78.1 (25.6)	78.8 (26.0)	71.3 (21.8)	57.5 (14.2)	44.7 (7.1)	38.1 (3.4)	57.7 (14.3)
Daily mean °F (°C)	34.0 (1.1)	36.7 (2.6)	41.1 (5.1)	47.4 (8.6)	55.2 (12.9)	59.8 (15.4)	65.8 (18.8)	66.4 (19.1)	60.1 (15.6)	49.5 (9.7)	39.8 (4.3)	34.2 (1.2)	49.2 (9.6)
Mean daily minimum °F (°C)	29.5 (−1.4)	30.3 (−0.9)	33.1 (0.6)	37.5 (3.1)	44.2 (6.8)	49.4 (9.7)	53.4 (11.9)	53.9 (12.2)	48.9 (9.4)	41.5 (5.3)	34.8 (1.6)	30.2 (−1.0)	40.6 (4.8)
Mean minimum °F (°C)	17.4 (−8.1)	21.2 (−6.0)	25.5 (−3.6)	30.7 (−0.7)	35.8 (2.1)	42.5 (5.8)	47.3 (8.5)	47.3 (8.5)	41.4 (5.2)	31.8 (−0.1)	24.4 (−4.2)	19.1 (−7.2)	11.2 (−11.6)
Record low °F (°C)	−2 (−19)	0 (−18)	9 (−13)	24 (−4)	28 (−2)	33 (1)	38 (3)	37 (3)	31 (−1)	18 (−8)	5 (−15)	−2 (−19)	−2 (−19)
Average precipitation inches (mm)	12.25 (311)	7.38 (187)	8.16 (207)	4.60 (117)	2.71 (69)	2.25 (57)	1.25 (32)	1.51 (38)	3.41 (87)	8.64 (219)	13.66 (347)	11.57 (294)	77.39 (1,965)
Average snowfall inches (cm)	12.2 (31)	9.9 (25)	4.2 (11)	0.3 (0.76)	0.0 (0.0)	0.0 (0.0)	0.0 (0.0)	0.0 (0.0)	0.0 (0.0)	0.0 (0.0)	3.1 (7.9)	16.0 (41)	45.7 (116.66)
Average extreme snow depth inches (cm)	11.0 (28)	7.7 (20)	4.1 (10)	0.1 (0.25)	0.0 (0.0)	0.0 (0.0)	0.0 (0.0)	0.0 (0.0)	0.0 (0.0)	0.0 (0.0)	1.9 (4.8)	9.7 (25)	16.0 (41)
Average precipitation days (≥ 0.01 in)	18.8	15.6	19.0	16.5	12.8	12.1	6.4	6.3	10.8	16.6	19.9	19.5	174.3
Average snowy days (≥ 0.1 in)	4.4	2.6	2.0	0.1	0.0	0.0	0.0	0.0	0.0	0.0	1.3	5.1	15.5
Source 1: NOAA
Source 2: National Weather Service

== Recreation ==
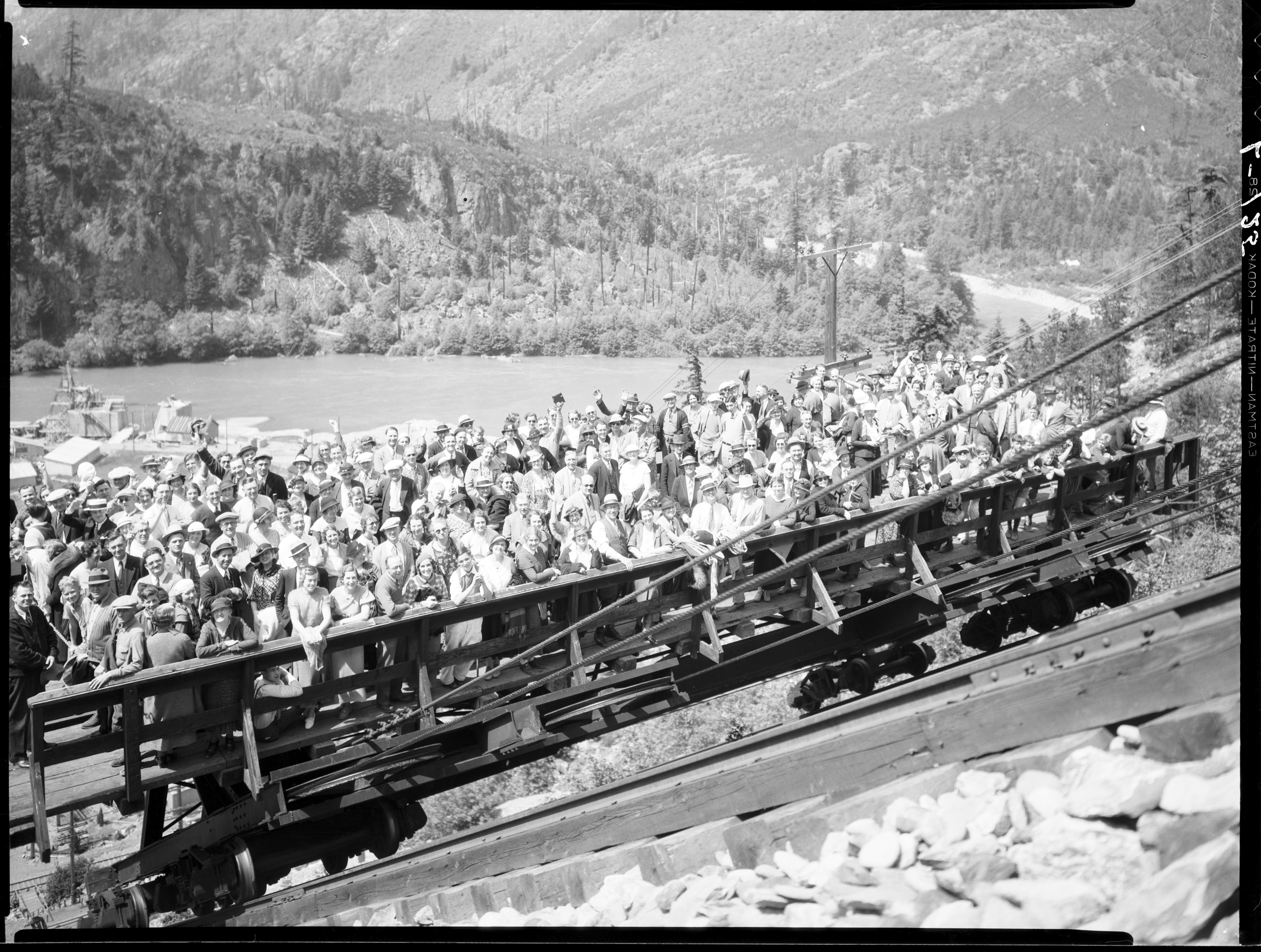
Tourists on the Diablo incline. (1935)

From 1928 until the start of World War II, City Light offered guided tours of the Skagit River Hydroelectric Project. From Rockport, visitors rode City Light's steam locomotive 23 miles (37 km) to Newhalem. The next day, visitors boarded a train to Diablo, where they toured the powerhouse and rode an inclined lift, previously used in the construction of Diablo and Ross dams, to the top of the dam. The tour continued by barge or tour boat to Ruby Creek before returning to Rockport. By 1941, more than 100,000 people had visited the Skagit Project. After the war, tours resumed in a shortened format.

Since 1986, Diablo has been home to the North Cascades Environmental Learning Center, which provides lodging, getaways, tours of Diablo Lake, photography, art classes, and a conference center. The center is operated by The North Cascades Institute, which partners with Seattle City Light to offer tours of the dams and powerhouses.

Diablo is located within Ross Lake National Recreation Area, a part of the North Cascades National Park Service Complex. The area offers trails, camping grounds, boat launches, and places to fish.

=== Historic places ===
Several buildings and sites within Diablo and surrounding areas are listed on the National Register of Historic Places:

- Beaver Pass Shelter
- Diablo Hydroelectric Power Plant
- Rock Cabin
- Skagit River and Newhalem Creek Hydroelectric Projects
- Sourdough Mountain Lookout
- Swamp–Meadow Cabin (east)
- Swamp–Meadow Cabin (west)

== Notable people ==
- Elizabeth W. Jones, geneticist, was born in Seattle and lived in Diablo for a decade as a child.
- Jeff Sherman, founding member of the band Glass, was born in Seattle and lived in Diablo as a child.
