= Sourdough Fire =

2023 wildfire in Washington, U.S.

- Part of the 2023 Washington wildfires
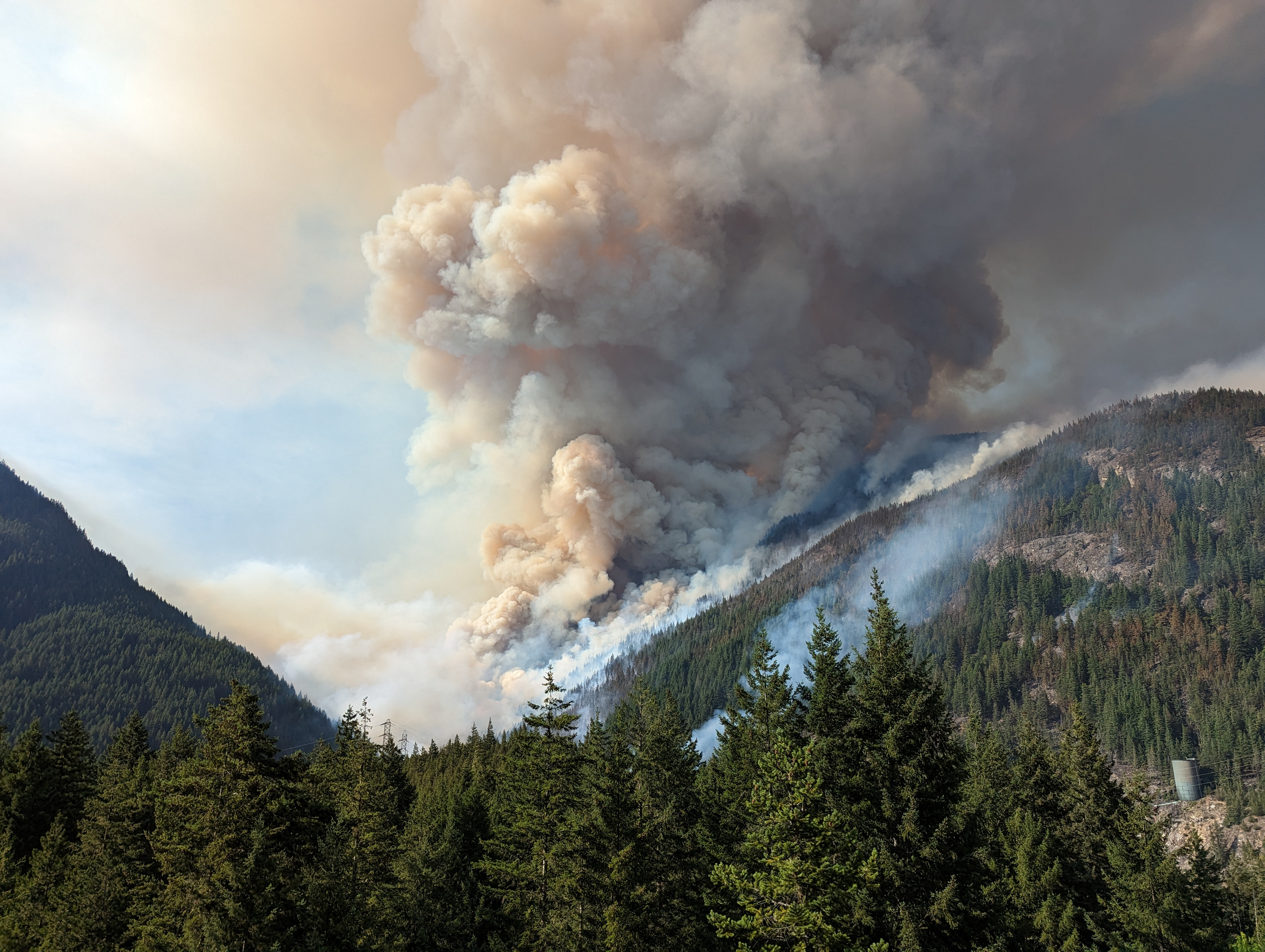
- Smoke plumes from the fire seen on August 4
- Date: July 29, 2023 – October 1, 2023
- Location: North Cascades National Park; Whatcom County, Washington, U.S.
- Coordinates: 48°43′18″N 121°8′8″W

Statistics
- Burned area: 6,369 acres (2,577 ha) as of September 15

Ignition
- Cause: Lightning strike

Map
- Estimated perimeter of Sourdough Fire with Skagit River dams marked (map data)

The Sourdough Fire was a wildfire in Whatcom County, Washington, in the Pacific Northwest region of the United States. It was reported on July 29, 2023, near Sourdough Mountain in North Cascades National Park and was likely caused by an earlier lightning strike. The fire caused the closure of the North Cascades Highway (State Route 20) and evacuations of recreational facilities and three Seattle City Light hydroelectric dams in the area. As of September 15, 2023, the Sourdough Fire had been estimated to have burned 6,369 acres (2,577 ha) and was 25 percent contained.

== History ==
The Sourdough Fire was first reported on July 29, 2023, three days after a thunderstorm in the area with lightning strikes that caused nearby fires. It is named for Sourdough Mountain in North Cascades National Park. The fire grew to over 1,440 acres (580 ha) by August 4 and prompted the immediate closure of the North Cascades Highway (State Route 20) between Newhalem and Rainy Pass. It was initially reported on August 5 to be nearly 3,000 acres (1,200 ha) but the estimate was revised down with the use of more accurate mapping. The North Cascades Highway reopened on August 9, but closed again two days later due to increased fire activity near the road.

Evacuations were ordered at several campsites and recreational facilities in the park around Diablo Lake. By August 11, the fire burned approximately 1,809 acres (732 ha) and was 5 percent contained with 411 firefighters, 6 helicopters, and several aircraft dispatched to the area. The Sourdough Mountain Lookout, a historic fire lookout tower atop the mountain, was wrapped in fireproof material to protect it from damage. The fire generated a large pyrocumulus cloud on August 4 that was visible from the Puget Sound region.

Fire officials expect the Sourdough Fire to continue southeast towards Diablo Lake and Gorge Lake and potentially west where "more continuous fuels exist". The fire, described as "long-duration", is not expected to be contained until October due to warm temperatures and low humidity. The community of Diablo is expected to remain under evacuation orders, along with the Diablo Dam. Seattle City Light plans to continue operating the three hydroelectric dams in the area and suspended its tours of Diablo Lake. During evacuations of staff on August 2, the Diablo and Ross dams went offline while Gorge Dam continued with reduced output of about 50 percent; and several transmission lines were also shut down to prevent shorting. Power generation at the Diablo and Ross dams resumed on August 9.

The fire was directed west towards Newhalem by firefighters using "burnout techniques"; the area near Newhalem includes burn scars from a 2015 wildfire that would slow progress. The strategy was paused after a red flag warning was issued by the National Weather Service for the Diablo area with a high temperature of 104 °F (40 °C) recorded on August 13. Smoke from the fire moved southwest into the Puget Sound region, including Seattle, on August 13 and caused worsened air quality readings. The smoke from the Sourdough Fire and other fires in Washington and British Columbia returned to the Puget Sound region the following week and caused the air quality index in Seattle to reach 190 on August 20, the worst among major cities globally.

The North Cascades Highway reopened on August 23 for through travelers, with stops prohibited and recreation areas remaining closed due to the Sourdough and Blue Lake fires. It closed a day later and was reopened on August 30 for travel with pilot vehicles to direct traffic. The North Cascades Institute cancelled all of their programs for 2023 as a result of the fire, which forced their on-site employees to evacuate from dormitories. Management of the Sourdough Fire was transferred from the Northwest Incident Management Team 8 to the National Park Service on August 29 following successful containment measures. The fire's spread slowed after rainfall in early September as containment reached 25 percent; several campsites and recreation areas in the North Cascades National Park Complex were reopened on September 11 due to improved conditions.
