= Ruby Dam =

Ruby Dam may refer to several dams:

- Ruby Dam, a variant name for Ross Dam
- Ruby Dam (Montana), a dam on the Ruby River
