= Skagit =

Skagit (/ˈskædʒɪt/ SKA-jit) may refer to:

- Upper Skagit Indian Tribe, a federally recognized tribe in Skagit County, Washington
- Lower Skagit, a historic Lushootseed-speaking tribe located around northern Whidbey Island in the US state of Washington
- Skagit language, the traditional language of the Skagits, typically called Lushootseed
- Skagit Bay
- Skagit County, Washington
- Skagit Range
- Skagit River
- Skagit River Hydroelectric Project
- Skagit Valley
