= Skagit Environmental Endowment Commission =

The Skagit Environmental Endowment Commission (SEEC) is a binational body established by the governments of the United States and Canada to support conservation of the Skagit River basin. It was created under the High Ross Treaty, an agreement between the two countries concerning the management of the Skagit River in British Columbia and Washington State.

== Mandate ==
The responsibilities of the Commission are described in an annex to the High Ross Treaty. Under the Treaty, the Commission’s mandate is to conserve and protect wilderness and wildlife habitat, enhance recreational opportunities, eliminate mineral and timber rights consistent with conservation and recreation purposes, conduct studies and plan for the construction of hiking trails, footbridges, interpretive displays and the like.

== History ==
The Skagit Environmental Endowment Commission and its Skagit Endowment Fund were established in 1984 by the High Ross Treaty between the U.S. and Canada. The founding mandate of the Commission was to manage an endowment fund and to influence conservation and protection of wilderness and wildlife in the transboundary Upper Skagit watershed.

== Structure ==
The Commission consists of sixteen members. Eight members are appointed by the Premier of British Columbia to represent Canada, and eight members are appointed by the Mayor of Seattle to represent the United States. Commissioners serve four-year terms on a staggered basis. The Commission provides strategic direction for the organization and oversees the stewardship and disbursement of the endowment fund in accordance with the Treaty provisions.
