= Diablo Lake =

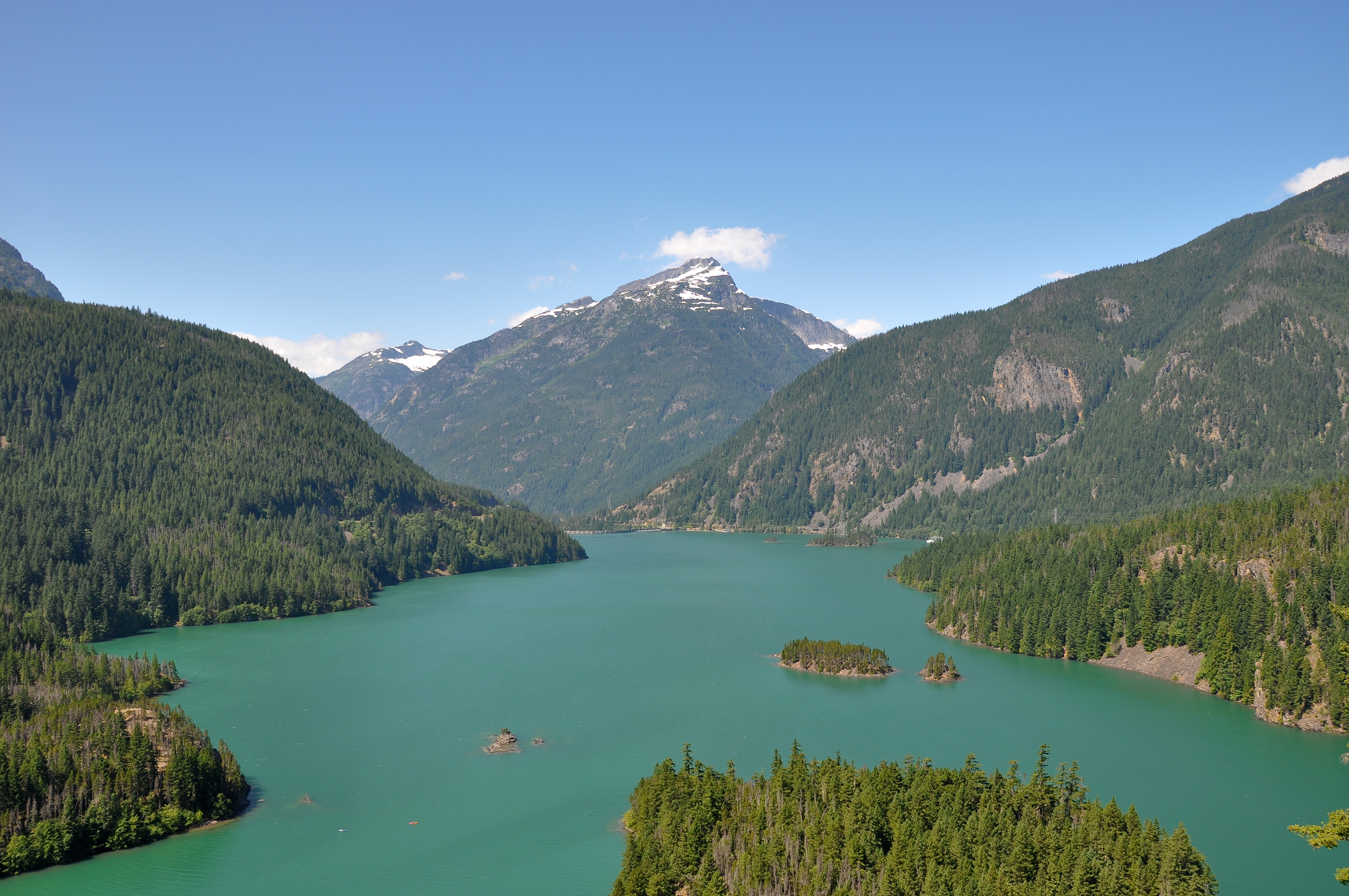

- Location within Washington (state) Location within the United States
- Location: Ross Lake National Recreation Area, Whatcom County, Washington, United States
- Coordinates: 48°42′51″N 121°7′52″W
- Type: reservoir
- Basin countries: United States
- Max. length: 4.5 miles (7.2 km)
- Max. depth: 390 feet (120 m)
- Water volume: 90,000 acre-feet (110 hm^{3})
- Surface elevation: 1,201 feet (366 m)

Diablo Lake is a reservoir in the North Cascade mountains of northern Washington state, United States. Created by Diablo Dam, the lake is located between Ross Lake and Gorge Lake on the Skagit River at an elevation of 1,201 feet (366 m) above sea level. Diablo Lake is part of the Skagit River Hydroelectric Project and managed by Seattle City Light.

== History ==
The Skagit Valley was formed via runoff from Cordilleran Glacier. The turquoise hue of the lake's water is attributed to surrounding glaciers grinding rocks into glacial flour that stays suspended in the lake.

=== Diablo Dam ===
The Diablo Dam is a part of the Skagit River Hydroelectric Project, which is owned and operated by Seattle City Light. Construction finished in 1930 and the dam became operational in 1936.

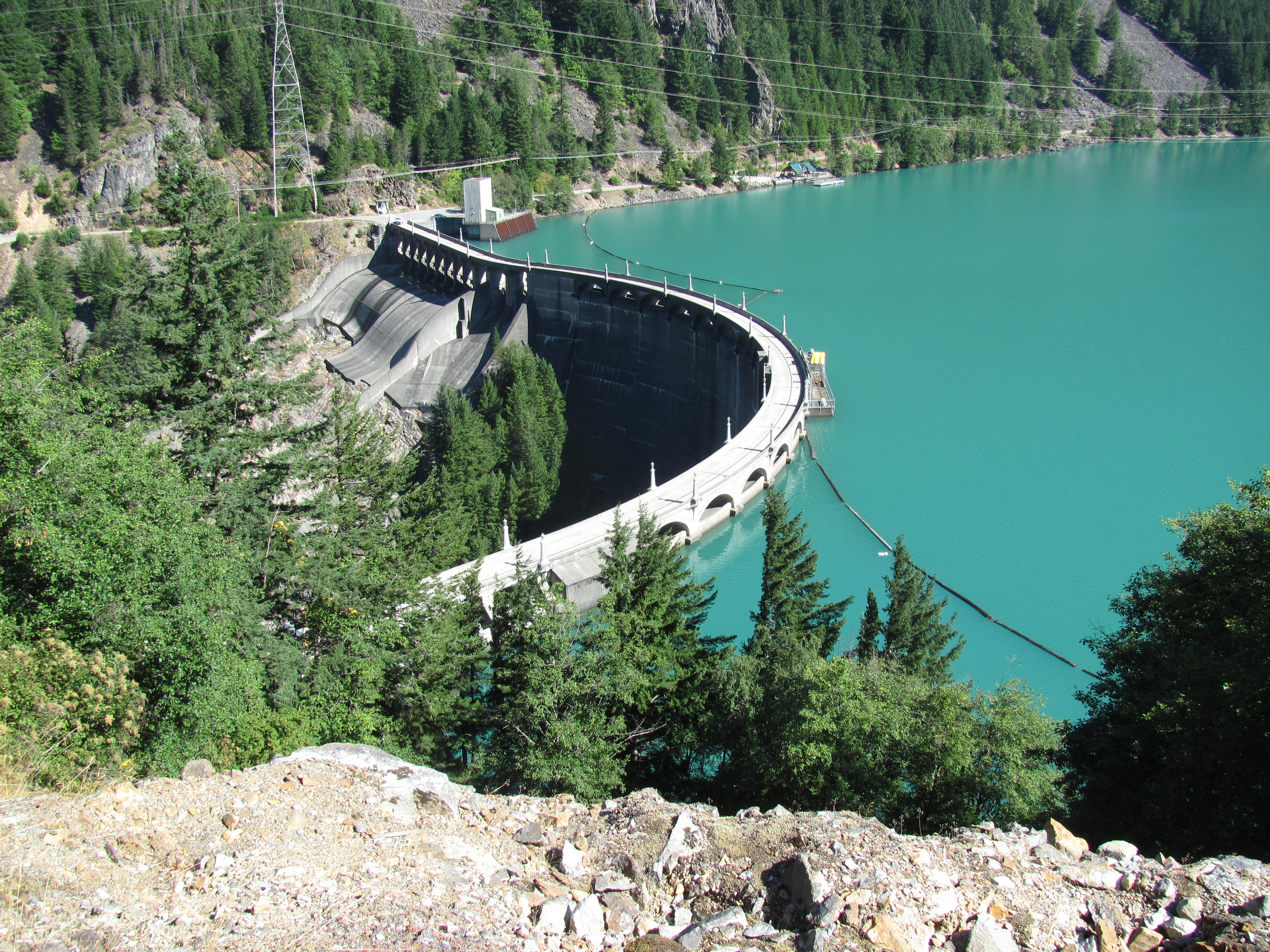
2010 Diablo Dam

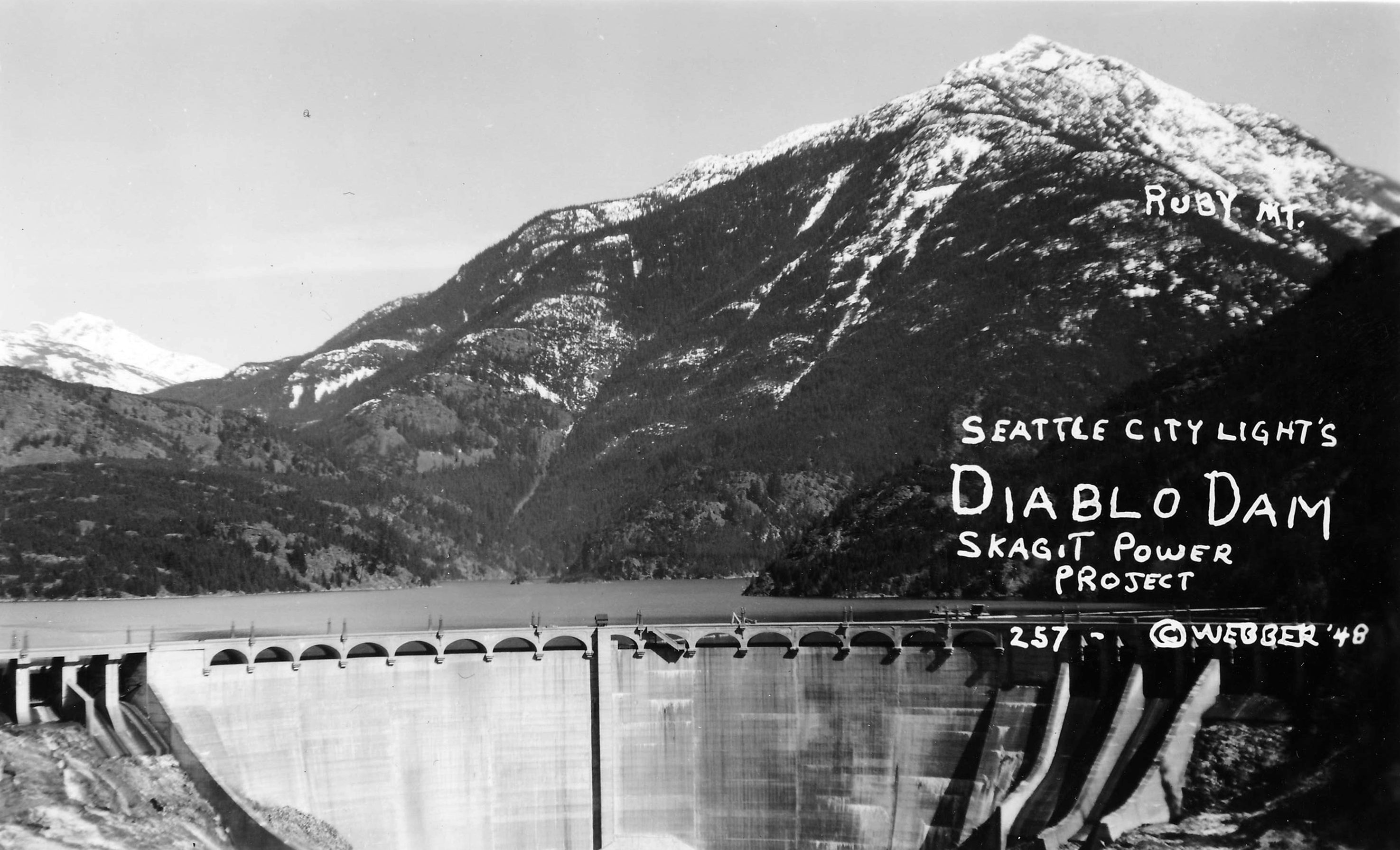
Diablo Dam Skagit Power Project 1948

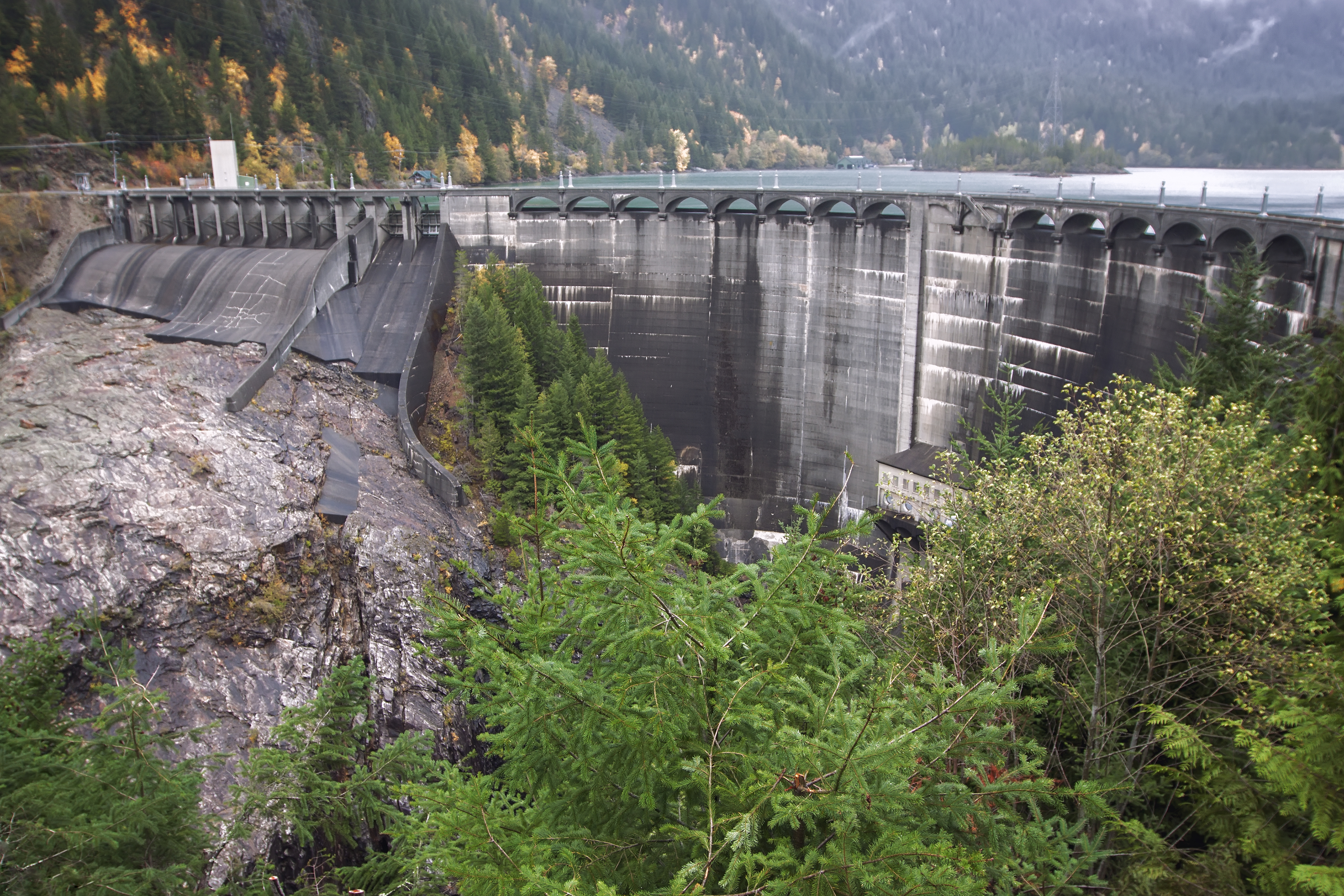
Northwest side view of dam

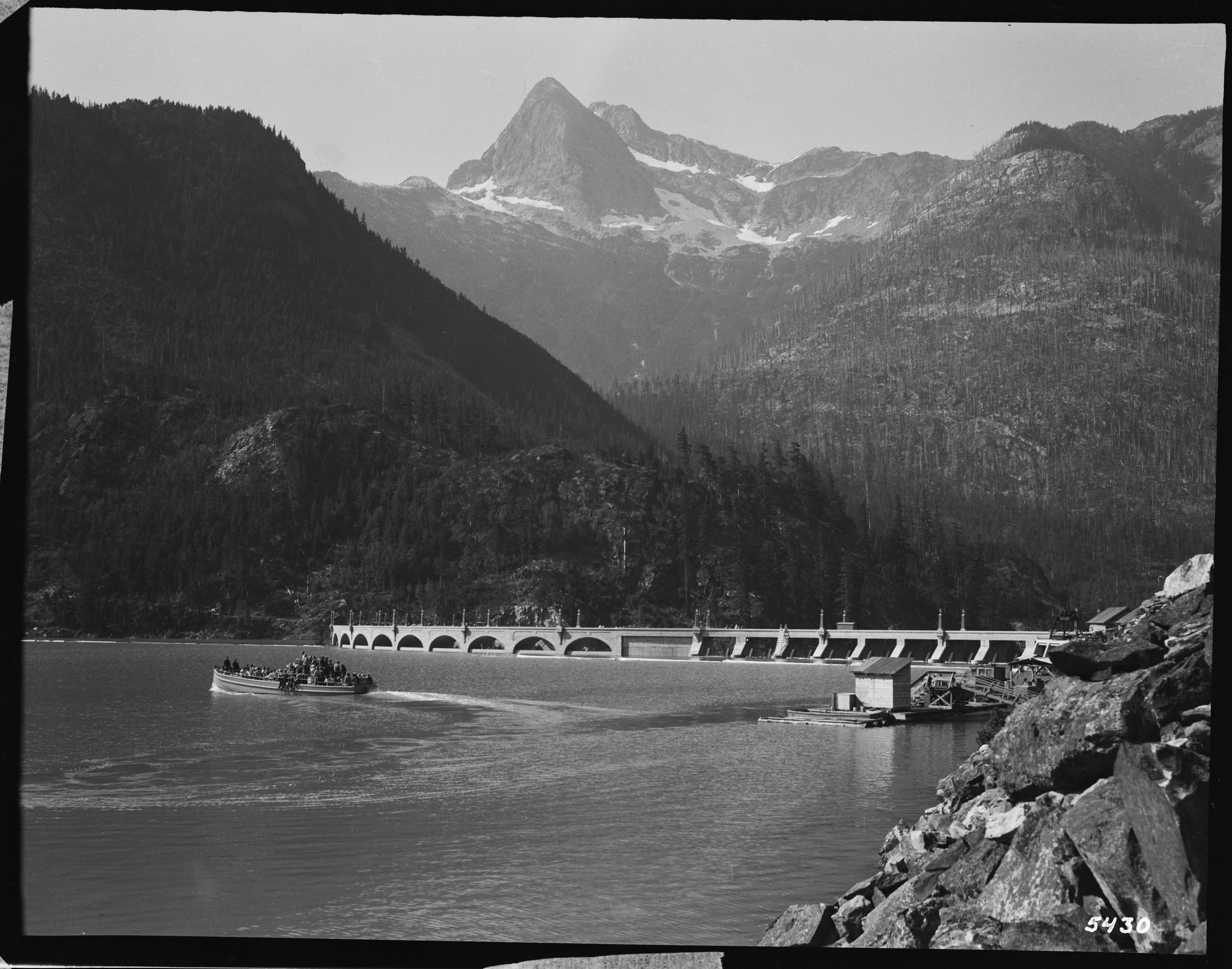
1931, one year after opening Diablo Dam

== Recreation ==
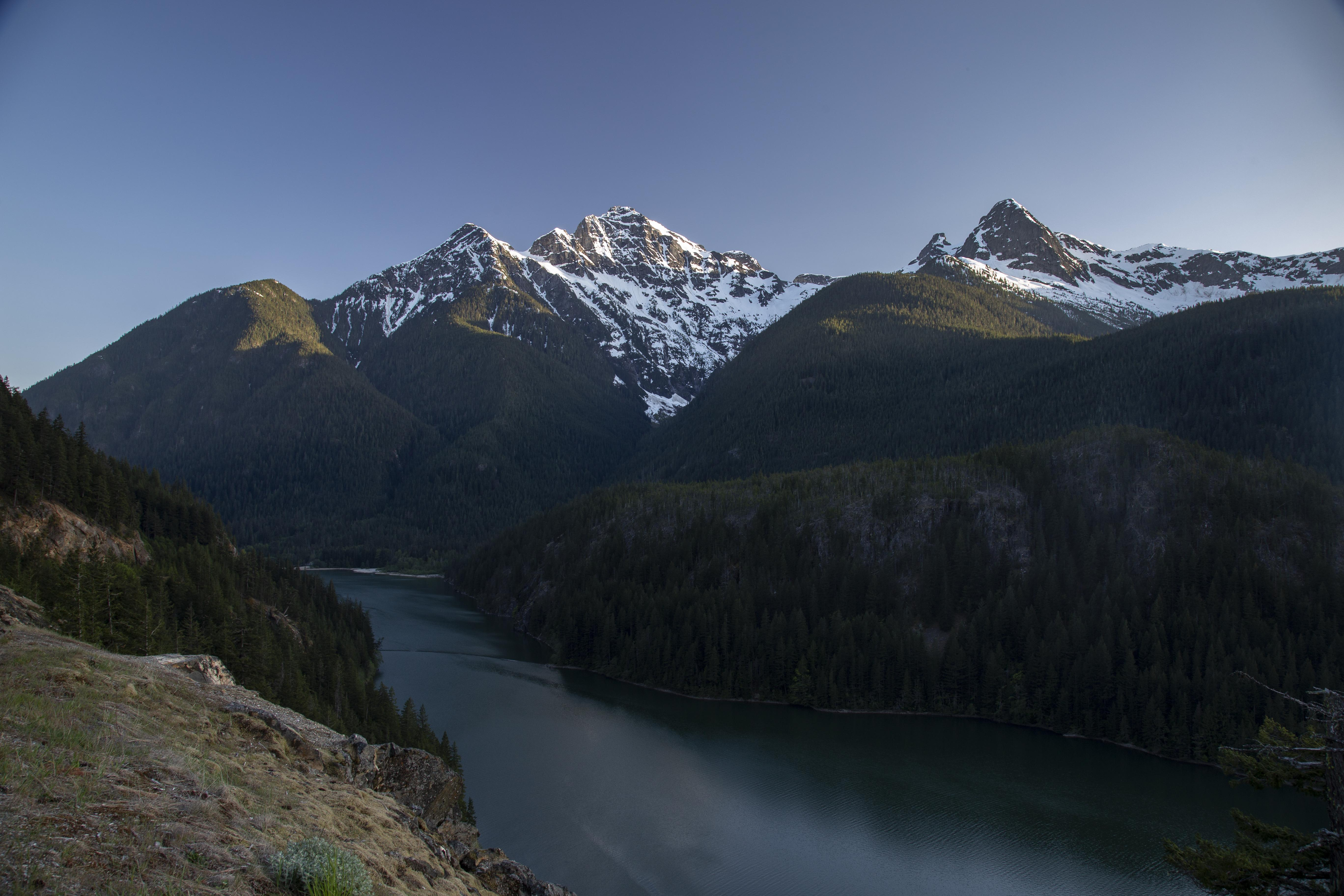
Birds eye view of the lake and the surrounding forest and mountains

Diablo Lake Trail is the main hike surrounding the lake. It is a moderately difficult 7.6 mile hike that reaches approximately 1,300 feet.

=== Fishing ===
The lake holds rainbow, coastal cutthroat, brook, and bull trout. Two-pole fishing is prohibited at Diablo Lake.

== See also ==
- List of dams and reservoirs in the United States § Washington
