= Ruby Creek (Skagit River tributary) =

- Mouth of Ruby Creek

Location
- Country: United States
- State: Washington
- County: Whatcom

Physical characteristics
- Source: Confluence of Granite Creek and Canyon Creek
  - coordinates: 47°49′05″N 124°18′05″W
  - elevation: 1,880 ft (570 m)approx.
- Mouth: Ross Lake
  - coordinates: 48°42′43″N 120°59′11″W
  - elevation: 1,604 ft (489 m)Subject to changes in reservoir water levels
- Length: 3.39 mi (5.46 km)
- Basin size: 208.86 mi^{2} (540.9 km^{2})
- Discharge
  - average: 20.37 m^{3}/s (719 cu ft/s)estimated

Ruby Creek is a tributary of the Skagit River located in the North Cascades of Northwestern Washington. The river's watershed drains the southern Washington portion of the Hozameen Range, and the western section of the North Cascades Scenic Corridor. The creek was named by three prospectors, John Sutter, George Sanger, and John Rowley, in 1872. Sutter believed he found a ruby in the creek, leading to the name, however the stone was actually a misidentified garnet. Ruby Creek had an original length of approximately 11 kilometers, before the lower 6 kilometers were inundated by Ross Lake, reducing it to its current length of 5 kilometers.

== History ==
Ruby Creek was first discovered in the summer of 1859 by most likely Henry Custer, however, there is a questionable account of prospectors in the area earlier that year. Ruby creek would not be visited again until the year of its naming 1872. In 1879 substantial amounts of gold were found in the creek, leading to its first mining claim "Nip and Tuck" and with it the start of the first gold rush in the North Cascades. In excess of 600 claims were filed, and between several hundred and 2,500 people worked the creek, however low profitability ended most mining by the fall of 1880. Small amounts of mining persisted in the area, most notably the Ruby Hydraulic Gold Mining Co. mine operating between the late 1890s and early 1900s located approximately two miles up the creek from its confluence with the Skagit River, the site was flooded by Ross Lake in 1947.

The area was never heavily settled, however many cabins, and a store were constructed in the area during the gold rush period.

== Tributaries ==
- Canyon Creek
- Granite Creek

=== Left ===
- Panther Creek
- 5 unnamed watercourses

=== Right ===
- Crater Creek
- 2 unnamed watercourses

== See also ==
- List of rivers of Washington (state)
- North Cascades
