= Skagit River Hydroelectric Project =

- Skagit River and Newhalem Creek Hydroelectric Projects
- U.S. National Register of Historic Places
- U.S. Historic district
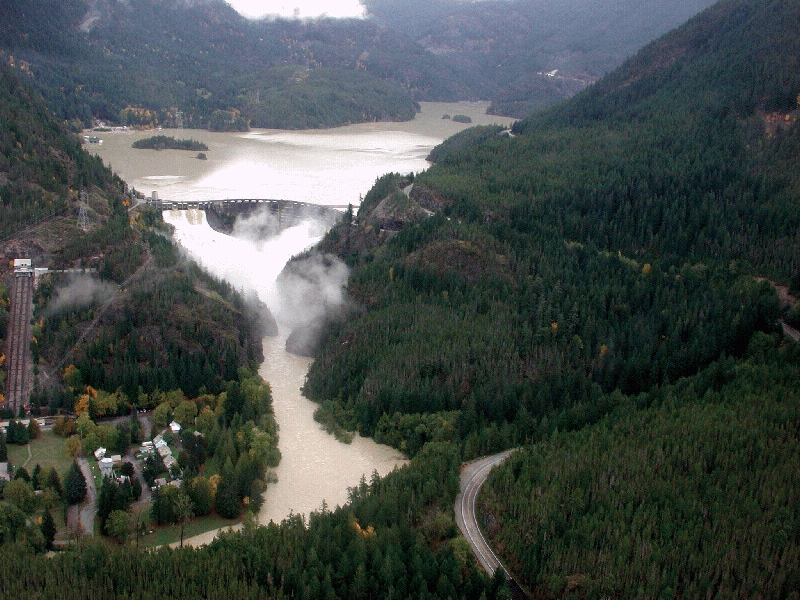
- Diablo Dam, one of three dams in the overall project

- Location within Washington (state)
- Location: Whatcom County, Washington
- Nearest city: Newhalem, Washington
- Area: 42 acres (17.0 ha)
- Built: 1917
- Architect: Lars Jorgenson
- Architectural style: Classical Revival, Bungalow/American craftsman, Industrial
- MPS: Hydroelectric Power Plants in Washington State, 1890–1938 MPS
- NRHP reference No.: 96000416 (original); 11000016 (increase)

Significant dates
- Added to NRHP: April 26, 1996
- Boundary increase: February 11, 2011

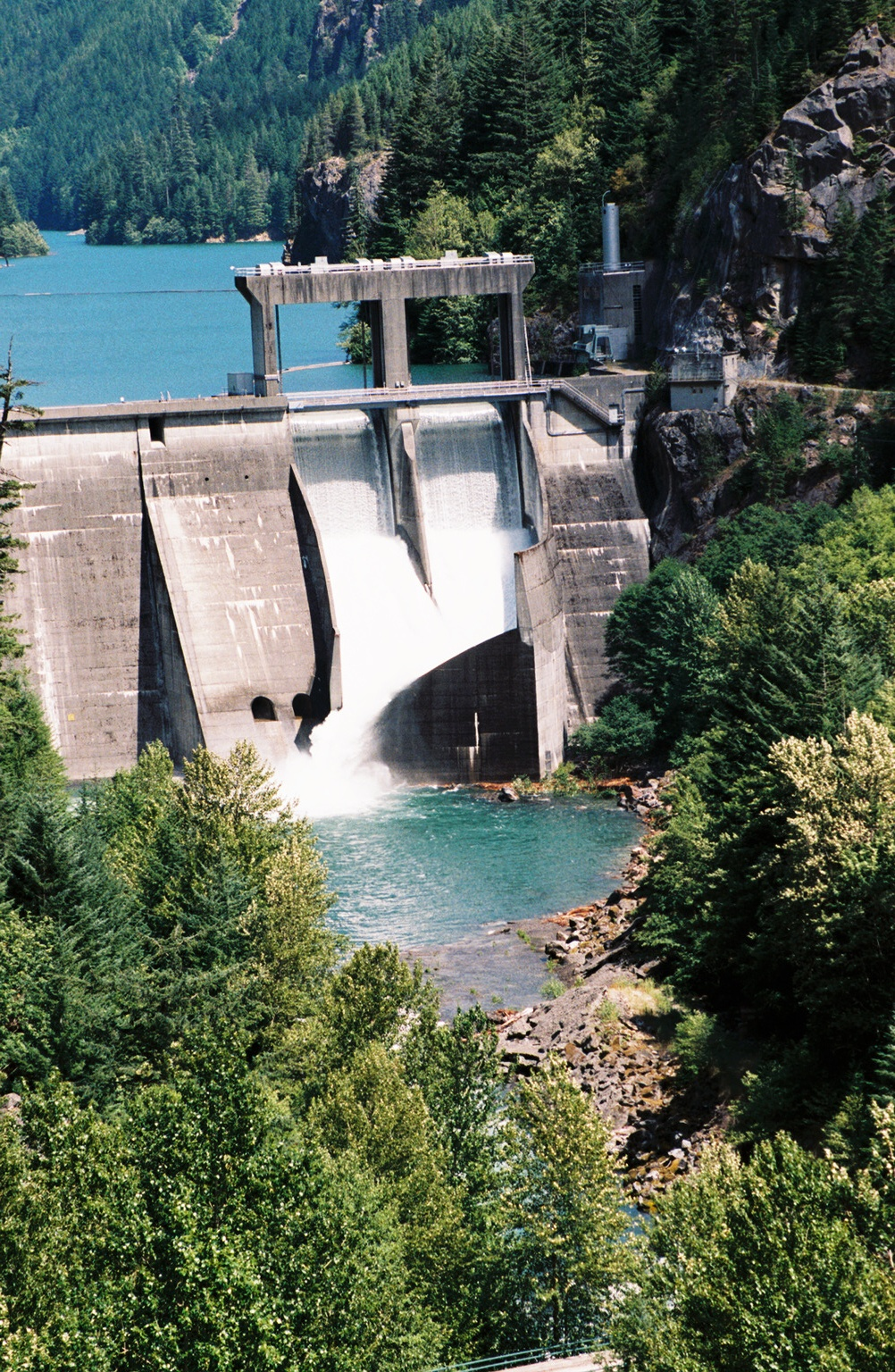
Gorge Dam on the Skagit River

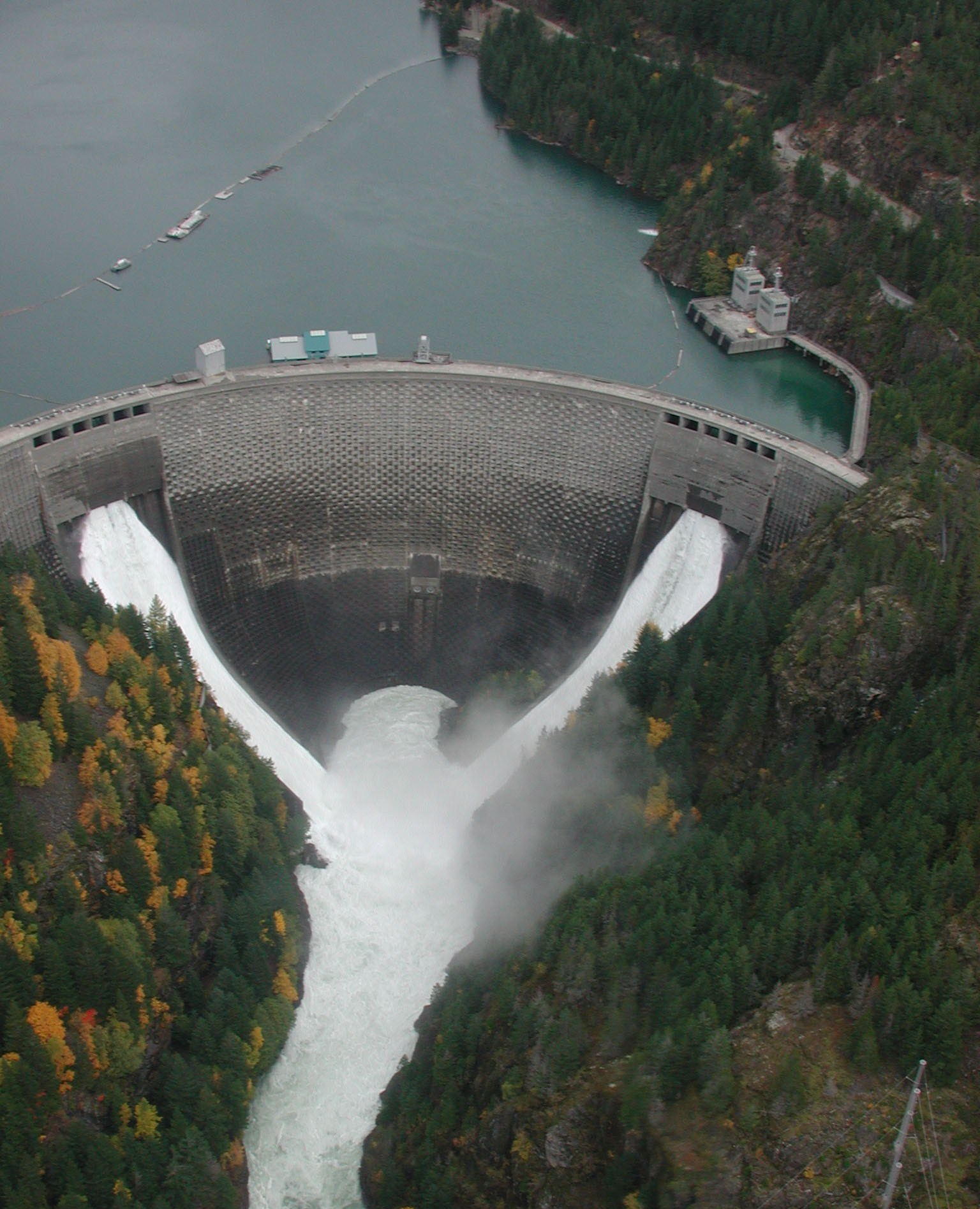
Ross Dam on the Skagit River

The Skagit River Hydroelectric Project is a series of dams with hydroelectric power-generating stations on the Skagit River in the north of the U.S. state of Washington. The project is owned and operated by Seattle City Light to provide electric power for the City of Seattle and surrounding communities.

As of 2024, the Skagit Hydroelectric Project accounts for 17.5 percent of Seattle City Light's energy resources.

== History ==
In 1917, James Delmage Ross, superintendent of lighting for Seattle, obtained approval from the Department of Agriculture to build dams on the Skagit River. The city council approved $1.5 million in bonds for construction and appointed Carl F. Uhden as the project superintendent. The construction camp was set up at the mouth of Newhalem Creek, giving the unincorporated community its name.

Uhden hired contractors to build a 25-mile rail line to Gorge Creek, allowing Seattle City Light to control access to the area. After the railroad reached the site above Newhalem, a two-mile tunnel was dug between the dam and the powerhouse. Work was frequently delayed by floods, mudslides, and avalanches. The schedule was further delayed by workers leaving to hunt for gold, labor troubles, a forest fire, and a shortage of electricity. Although Ross had estimated that the Skagit River operation would provide electricity to Seattle by 1921, those various delays pushed the date to 1924.

The Gorge Dam generators were formally started by President Calvin Coolidge on September 17, 1924.

In August 2021 Seattle City Light announced that it will undertake a study of the possibility of removing one or more of the Skagit dams for environmental reasons.

The dams were threatened by the Sourdough Fire in August 2023, which prompted the evacuation of City Light facilities in the area and reduction in output for the dams.

On March 5, 2026, City Light announced a $979 million settlement to build fish passages on the dams.

== Dams ==
The three major dams in the Skagit River Project are (from lower to upper) Gorge Dam, Diablo Dam, and Ross Dam. The dams are located in Whatcom County above the town of Newhalem, which lies just west of North Cascades National Park. Ross Lake, formed by Ross Dam, extends into British Columbia, which is 20 miles (32 km) upriver from the dam. Ross Lake National Recreation Area surrounds the lake.

Construction of Gorge Dam began in 1921 and the first power was delivered to Seattle in 1924. The cost of the dam was $13 million (equivalent to $244 million in 2025). In 1961 a new, 300-foot (91-meter), Gorge High Dam was completed to replace the original Gorge Dam. This dam was featured in Alan Pakula's 1974 thriller The Parallax View, starring Warren Beatty.

Construction of Diablo Dam was begun in 1927, 5 miles (8.0 km) upstream from Gorge Dam. Diablo Dam was completed in 1930, and at that time was the tallest dam in the world at 389 feet (119 meters) until Owyhee Dam was built. Although the dam was complete, financial problems due to the Great Depression delayed building the powerhouse, so the dam produced no electricity for Seattle until 1936.

Construction of Ruby Dam at the Rip Raps below Ruby Creek began in 1937. This dam was renamed Ross Dam after the death of James Delmage Ross (1872–1939), the superintendent of the Skagit River Project. Construction of Ross Dam was to take place in three stages and the first stage was completed in 1940. The second stage was completed in 1953 when the dam was built to its current height of 540 feet (160 meters). Seattle City Light ultimately decided not to pursue the final design height of 665 feet (203 m) due to controversy surrounding the flooding of lands in Canada. This was put to rest when the United States and Canada formally concluded negotiations that resulted in the High Ross Treaty signed in 1984.

All three dams are listed in the National Register of Historic Places. The total cost of the Skagit River Hydroelectric Project was $250 million over 50 years.

== Hydroelectric power capacity ==
Dam	Capacity (MW)	Location
Gorge	207.3	48°41′52″N 121°12′30″W
Diablo	182.4	48°42′51″N 121°07′52″W
Ross	450.0	48°43′54″N 121°04′02″W
Total	839.7	—

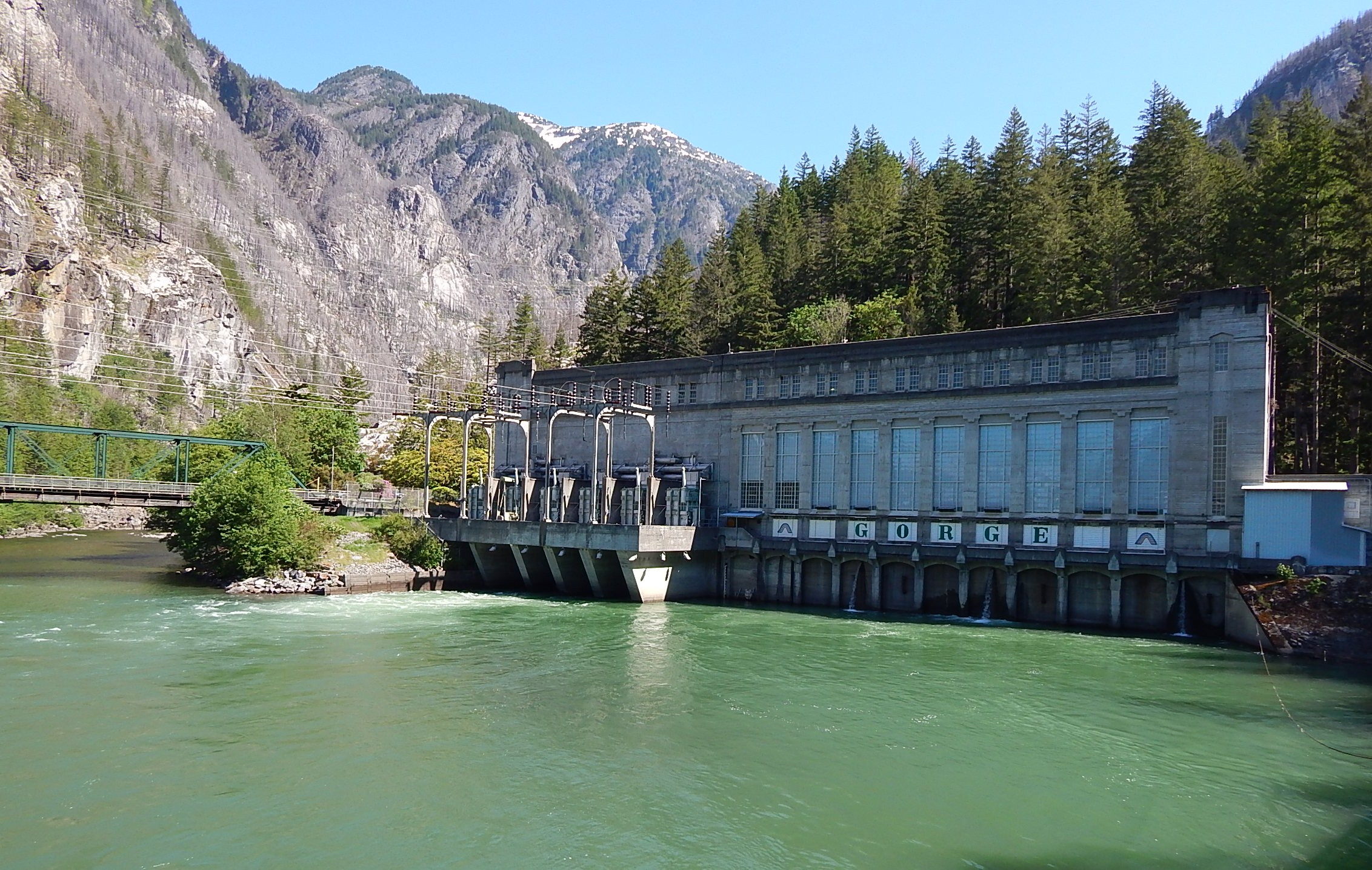
Gorge Powerhouse, Newhalem, Washington

== Tourism ==
From 1928 until the start of World War II, City Light offered guided tours of the Skagit Project. From Rockport, visitors rode City Light's steam locomotive 23 miles to Newhalem. Dormitories were provided, as were meals in The Gorge Inn. The next day, visitors boarded another train to Diablo, where they toured the powerhouse and rode an incline lift to the top of the dam. Next, they rode a barge or tour boat to Ruby Creek, then returned to Rockport. Over 100,000 people visited the Skagit Project by 1941. After the war, shortened tours resumed.

As of 2025, Seattle City Light provides guided tours of Diablo Lake via boat. Self-guided tours of the Newhalem, ladder creek falls, and the Gorge Powerhouse Gallery are available.

== Sources ==
- Historylink.org
- Seattle City Light Skagit Tours
- Larry Kunzler Historical Record of Dam Building and their Impacts on Floods of the Skagit River: 1924 through 1968
- Guide to the Seattle City Light Gorge Development Project Photographs and Photograph Albums 1948-1962
- Guide to the Seattle City Light Skagit Project: Diablo Dam Construction Photograph Albums 1919-1936
- Guide to the Seattle City Light Ross Dam Photograph Albums 1938-1948
- Guide to the Seattle City Light Skagit Youth Camp Records 1991-1996
- Nearby construction era photo, as the Ross Dam was being completed in 1956
- Tour boat on the lake formed by the Diablo Dam, during the construction era
- Construction photo of what became Ross Dam
