= Diablo Dam =

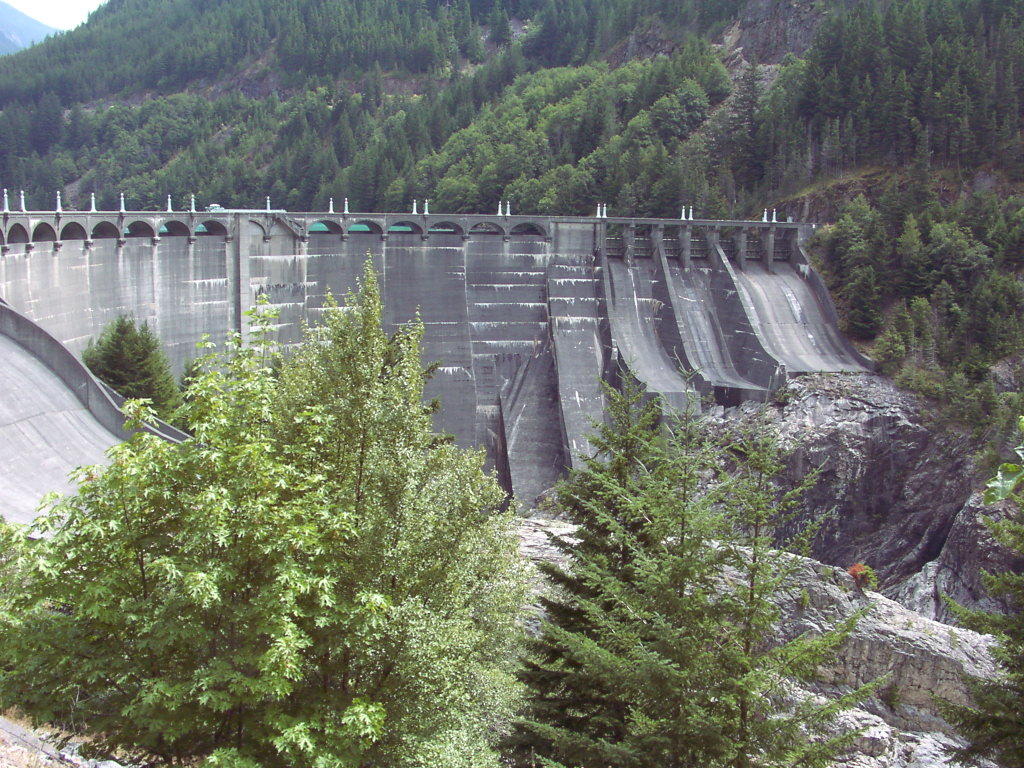
- Interactive map of Diablo Dam
- Location: Washington, U.S.
- Opening date: 1930

Dam and spillways
- Type of dam: Concrete arch-gravity
- Impounds: Skagit River
- Height: 389 ft (119 m)
- Length: 1,180 ft (360 m)

Reservoir
- Total capacity: 88,500 acre⋅ft (109,200,000 m^{3})
- Catchment area: 1,103 mi^{2} (2,860 km^{2})
- Surface area: 990 acres (400 ha)

Power Station
- Commission date: 1936
- Turbines: 2x 90.0 MW, 2x 1.2 MW
- Installed capacity: 182.4 MW
- Annual generation: 361.396 GWh(2024)

Diablo Dam is one of three dams along the upper Skagit River in Whatcom County, Washington and part of the Skagit River Hydroelectric Project that supplies Seattle with some of its power needs. The dam was built in Diablo Canyon, a gorge of solid granite with vertical walls rising 160 feet (49 m) from the river bed, yet were less than 100 feet (30 m) apart. Construction began in 1927, and was completed in 1930. The dam began generating electricity in 1936. The town of Diablo was established to house the workers building the dam.

The result was a power-generating dam that holds a reservoir known as Diablo Lake. At the time it was completed, Diablo Dam, at 389 feet (119 m), was the tallest dam in the world. As of 1951, water from the dam operated two main generators, each with a capacity of 64.5 MW. The dam and its original associated power generation infrastructure were listed on the National Register of Historic Places in 1989.

== Hydroelectric power capacity ==
Generator	Nameplate Capacity (MW)
31	90.0
32	90.0
33	1.2
34	1.2
Total	182.4

== Climate ==
The Western Regional Climate Center (WRCC) reports weather station 452157 at Diablo Dam since 1948, presently at 48°42′51″N 121°08′35″W with an elevation of 891 feet (272 m). The dam is in a transitional maritime-mediterranean climate (Köppen: Cfb/Csb) depending on summer rainfall isotherm.

Climate data for Diablo Dam, Washington (1991–2020 normals, extremes 1914–present)
Month	Jan	Feb	Mar	Apr	May	Jun	Jul	Aug	Sep	Oct	Nov	Dec	Year
Record high °F (°C)	62 (17)	63 (17)	76 (24)	90 (32)	103 (39)	110 (43)	106 (41)	106 (41)	101 (38)	87 (31)	65 (18)	59 (15)	110 (43)
Mean maximum °F (°C)	48.4 (9.1)	52.7 (11.5)	63.7 (17.6)	75.9 (24.4)	86.4 (30.2)	90.8 (32.7)	95.6 (35.3)	94.8 (34.9)	88.4 (31.3)	72.7 (22.6)	55.1 (12.8)	48.5 (9.2)	98.3 (36.8)
Mean daily maximum °F (°C)	38.5 (3.6)	43.2 (6.2)	49.0 (9.4)	57.2 (14.0)	66.1 (18.9)	70.3 (21.3)	78.1 (25.6)	78.8 (26.0)	71.3 (21.8)	57.5 (14.2)	44.7 (7.1)	38.1 (3.4)	57.7 (14.3)
Daily mean °F (°C)	34.0 (1.1)	36.7 (2.6)	41.1 (5.1)	47.4 (8.6)	55.2 (12.9)	59.8 (15.4)	65.8 (18.8)	66.4 (19.1)	60.1 (15.6)	49.5 (9.7)	39.8 (4.3)	34.2 (1.2)	49.2 (9.6)
Mean daily minimum °F (°C)	29.5 (−1.4)	30.3 (−0.9)	33.1 (0.6)	37.5 (3.1)	44.2 (6.8)	49.4 (9.7)	53.4 (11.9)	53.9 (12.2)	48.9 (9.4)	41.5 (5.3)	34.8 (1.6)	30.2 (−1.0)	40.6 (4.8)
Mean minimum °F (°C)	17.4 (−8.1)	21.2 (−6.0)	25.5 (−3.6)	30.7 (−0.7)	35.8 (2.1)	42.5 (5.8)	47.3 (8.5)	47.3 (8.5)	41.4 (5.2)	31.8 (−0.1)	24.4 (−4.2)	19.1 (−7.2)	11.2 (−11.6)
Record low °F (°C)	−2 (−19)	0 (−18)	9 (−13)	24 (−4)	28 (−2)	33 (1)	38 (3)	37 (3)	31 (−1)	18 (−8)	5 (−15)	−2 (−19)	−2 (−19)
Average precipitation inches (mm)	12.25 (311)	7.38 (187)	8.16 (207)	4.60 (117)	2.71 (69)	2.25 (57)	1.25 (32)	1.51 (38)	3.41 (87)	8.64 (219)	13.66 (347)	11.57 (294)	77.39 (1,965)
Average snowfall inches (cm)	12.2 (31)	9.9 (25)	4.2 (11)	0.3 (0.76)	0.0 (0.0)	0.0 (0.0)	0.0 (0.0)	0.0 (0.0)	0.0 (0.0)	0.0 (0.0)	3.1 (7.9)	16.0 (41)	45.7 (116.66)
Average extreme snow depth inches (cm)	11.0 (28)	7.7 (20)	4.1 (10)	0.1 (0.25)	0.0 (0.0)	0.0 (0.0)	0.0 (0.0)	0.0 (0.0)	0.0 (0.0)	0.0 (0.0)	1.9 (4.8)	9.7 (25)	16.0 (41)
Average precipitation days (≥ 0.01 in)	18.8	15.6	19.0	16.5	12.8	12.1	6.4	6.3	10.8	16.6	19.9	19.5	174.3
Average snowy days (≥ 0.1 in)	4.4	2.6	2.0	0.1	0.0	0.0	0.0	0.0	0.0	0.0	1.3	5.1	15.5
Source 1: NOAA
Source 2: National Weather Service

== Panorama ==
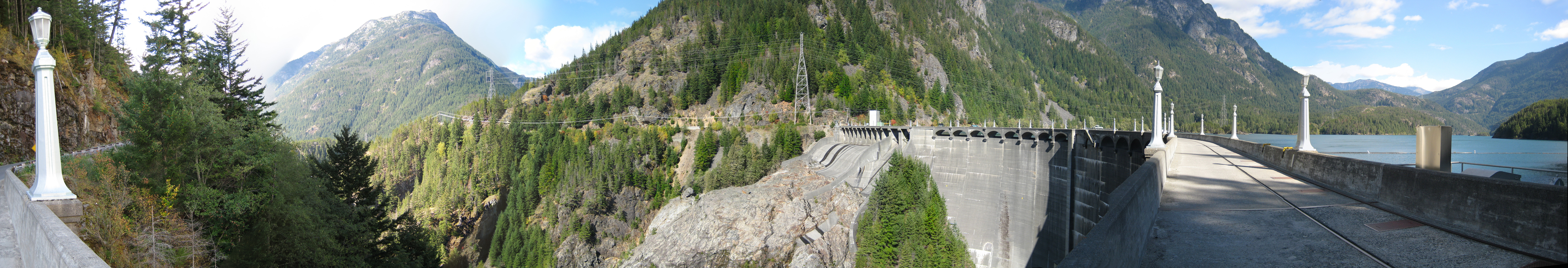
180° panorama from the top of Diablo Dam, Diablo Lake, Washington as seen on an early September afternoon.

== See also ==
- List of dams and reservoirs in Washington
- Skagit River
