= Ross Dam =

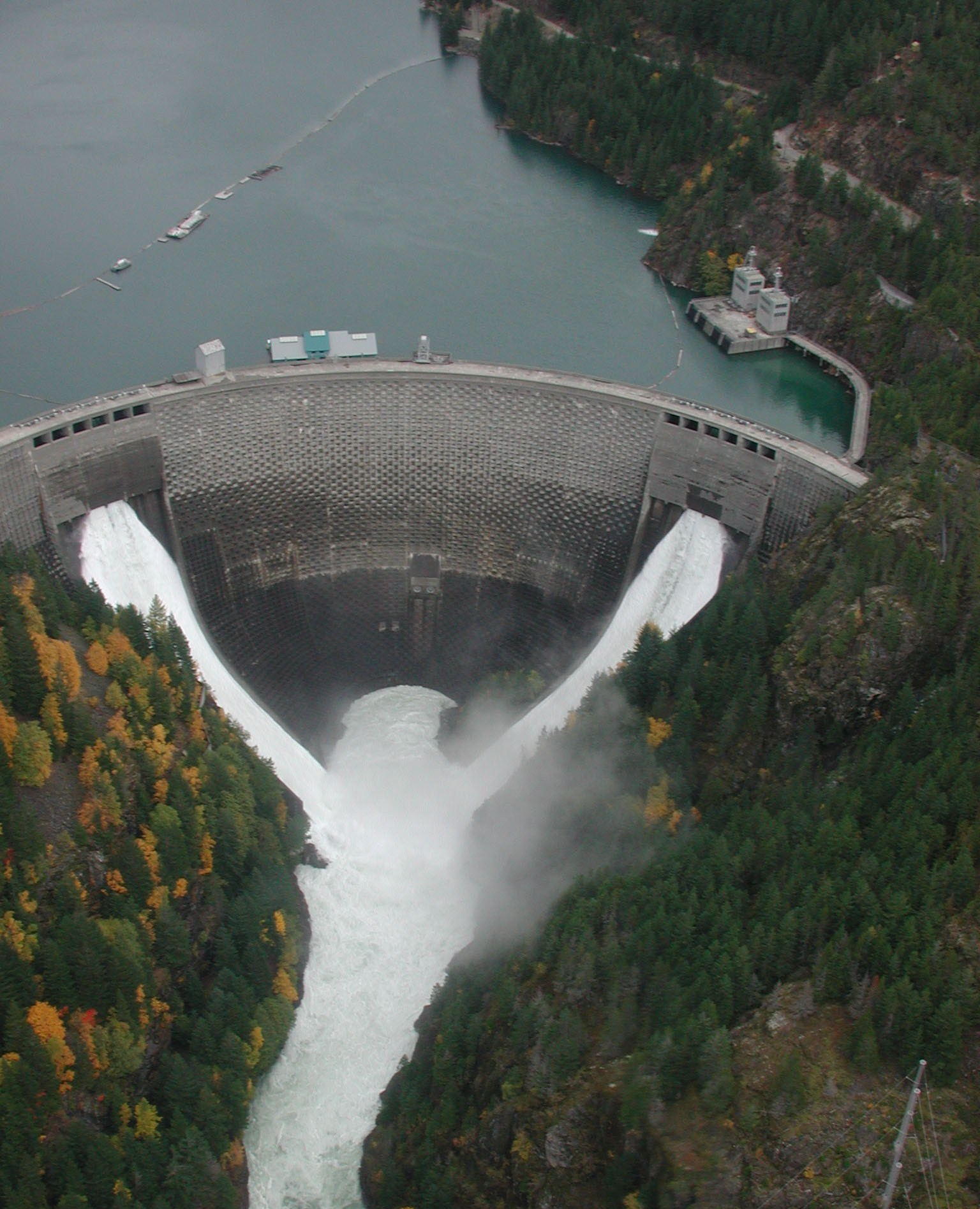
- Ross Dam during the Skagit River floods of 2003.
- Interactive map of Ross Dam
- Location: Ross Lake National Recreation Area, Whatcom County, Washington, USA
- Coordinates: 48°43′54″N 121°04′02″W
- Construction began: 1937
- Opening date: 1949

Dam and spillways
- Impounds: Skagit River
- Height: 540 feet (160 m)
- Length: 1,300 feet (400 m)

Reservoir
- Creates: Ross Lake
- Total capacity: 1,435,000 acre-feet (1.770 km^{3})
- Surface area: 11,700 acres (4,700 ha)

Power Station
- Turbines: 4x 112.5 MW
- Installed capacity: 450 MW
- Annual generation: 410.106 GWh(2024)
- Website https://www.seattle.gov/city-light/energy/power-supply-and-delivery/hydroelectric-resources/skagit-river-hydroelectric-project

Ross Dam is a 540-foot (160 m)-high, 1,300-foot (400 m)-long concrete thin arch dam across the Skagit River, forming Ross Lake. The dam is in Washington state, while Ross Lake extends 23 miles (37 km) north to British Columbia, Canada. Both dam and reservoir are located in Ross Lake National Recreation Area, is bordered on both sides by Stephen Mather Wilderness and combined with Lake Chelan National Recreation Area they make up North Cascades National Park Complex.

Built as part of the Skagit River Hydroelectric Project by Seattle City Light, the dam is part of a series of three dams through the Skagit Gorge that were built primarily to generate hydroelectricity from the massive elevation drop of over 1,000 feet (300 m) from the Canada-U.S. border to Newhalem. The other two dams are Diablo Dam, directly below Ross Dam, and Gorge Dam, further downstream. Ross Dam can generate up to 460 MW of electricity.

== History ==
=== Planning and early construction ===
Prior to construction of the dam the Skagit Gorge upstream of the dam was a wild, free flowing, completely undeveloped area. The canyon held an intact ancient forest of Douglas Fir, Western Hemlock and Western Redcedar, estimated to be millable into up to 340 million usable board feet of timber. With the creation of the Skagit River Hydroelectric Project in the 1910s, the first two dams, Gorge Dam and Diablo Dam, were constructed downstream of the Ross Dam site. In 1937, construction began on the dam, originally slated to be called Ruby Dam, on the first two of four planned construction phases. The name originates from Ruby Creek, a Skagit River tributary that flows southwest to meet the Skagit just upstream of the dam site. By 1940, phases 1 and 2 of the dam were complete, and the dam stood 305 feet (93 m) above the river. While the reservoir filled, the Decco-Walton Logging Company was formed in 1945 with the awarding of a contract from Seattle City Light. Decco-Walton logged the Skagit Gorge as Ross Lake slowly rose, and floated logs up the river to British Columbia, where it was hauled to the Fraser River. By the time Ross Lake filled, only 30 million board feet remained in the basin, less than 10% of the original timber.

=== Third phase ===
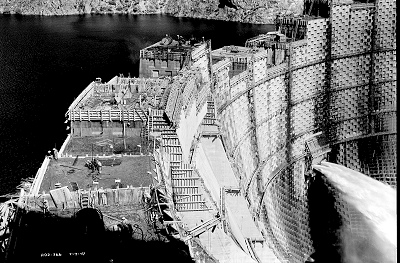
Ross Dam third construction phase, 1947

In 1939, superintendent of the Skagit Hydroelectric Project James Delmage Ross died, so Ruby Dam was renamed Ross Dam in his memory. In 1943 a consortium of contractors including Morrison-Knudsen, which had previously participated in construction of Hoover Dam, began new construction on the dam ultimately raising its height to 475 feet (145 m). Energy demands during World War II coincided with an energy shortage in Seattle, requiring that the dam be constructed quickly, but the dam did not generate any power until many years after the war ended. This third phase was finished in 1949, to 540 feet (160 m). This height would cause the reservoir at full pool to extend slightly past the Washington-British Columbia border. The reservoir, however, did not fill past the national border until 1954. As compensation for the flooded land, which totals about 500 acres (2.0 km^{2}), Seattle City Light paid the Province of British Columbia $250,000, as well as an annual payment of $5,000. Two years prior to the reservoir reaching full pool, construction of the Ross Dam power plant began, and two turbines first went on line in 1956, generating 360 MW of power. Another two generators were added later, increasing the capacity to its current 450 MW.

=== High Ross Dam ===
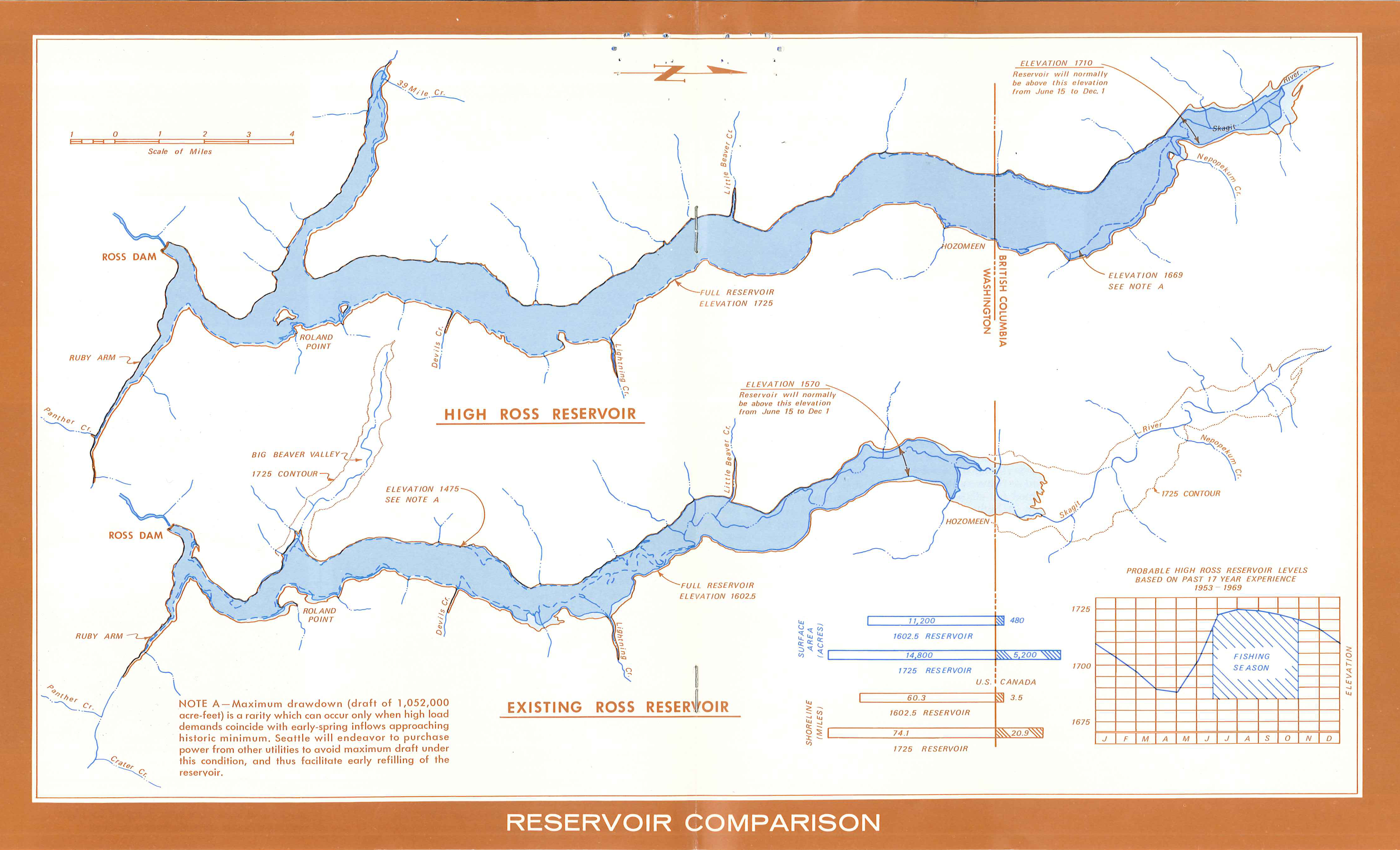
The upper map shows what the dimensions of the reservoir would have been if the high dam had been built. The lower map shows the existing dimensions of the reservoir. Dam is at left in both maps.

A controversy later arose over the planned fourth stage of the construction of Ross Dam. This argument over land became known as the High Ross Dam Controversy. The dam was built with the potential to be raised 125 feet (38 m) further, bringing the total height of the dam to 665 feet (203 m) and raising the reservoir to approximately 1,725 feet (526 m) above sea level. The stepped "concrete waffle" facing on the front of the dam was designed to accommodate this addition to the height. This would have flooded land into Canada approximately 3 miles (4.8 km) further, also extending up the Klesilkwa River, a Skagit River tributary, and provided the opportunity to generate about 272 MW of extra power, bringing the generating capacity to 732 MW. It wasn't until the 1970s when the High Ross project was finally ended. On the US side, the North Cascades Conservation Council inventoried the ancient forest of Big Beaver Creek which would have been flooded, and showed that City Light's statements that no unique forest environments would be lost were not true. On the Canadian side the raising of the dam was halted primarily by the extensive work by Curley Chittenden - logger turned environmentalist, who worked tirelessly to rally opposition to this additional flooding of the upper Skagit River basin. Ultimately a treaty was signed between the City of Seattle and Province of British Columbia to supply Seattle with the equivalent amount of power from other, existing dams in British Columbia in exchange for Seattle not raising the dam. The Skagit Environmental Endowment Commission was created at this time to oversee joint USA/Canada stewardship of the upper Skagit River watershed.

== Description ==
The Ross Dam is situated in the gorge of the Skagit River about midway along its 150-mile (240 km) length, and 23 miles (37 km) south of the Canada–US border. It is a concrete thin arch dam 540 feet (160 m) high and about 1,300 feet (400 m) long, stretching across one of the narrowest spots in the Skagit Gorge.

The North Cascades mountains rise nearly 5,000 feet (1,500 m) vertically from the floor of the canyon and surround it on both sides. Directly upstream of the dam, Ruby Creek flows into the reservoir, forming the Ruby Arm of Ross Lake. Directly downstream, Diablo Dam forms Diablo Lake, much smaller than Ross Lake. Other creeks that flow into Ross Lake include Little Beaver Creek and Big Beaver Creek from the west, and Lightning Creek from the east. North Cascades Highway, also known as Washington State Route 20, follows the Skagit River to where it turns away from the river at Ross Dam and follows Ruby Creek instead.

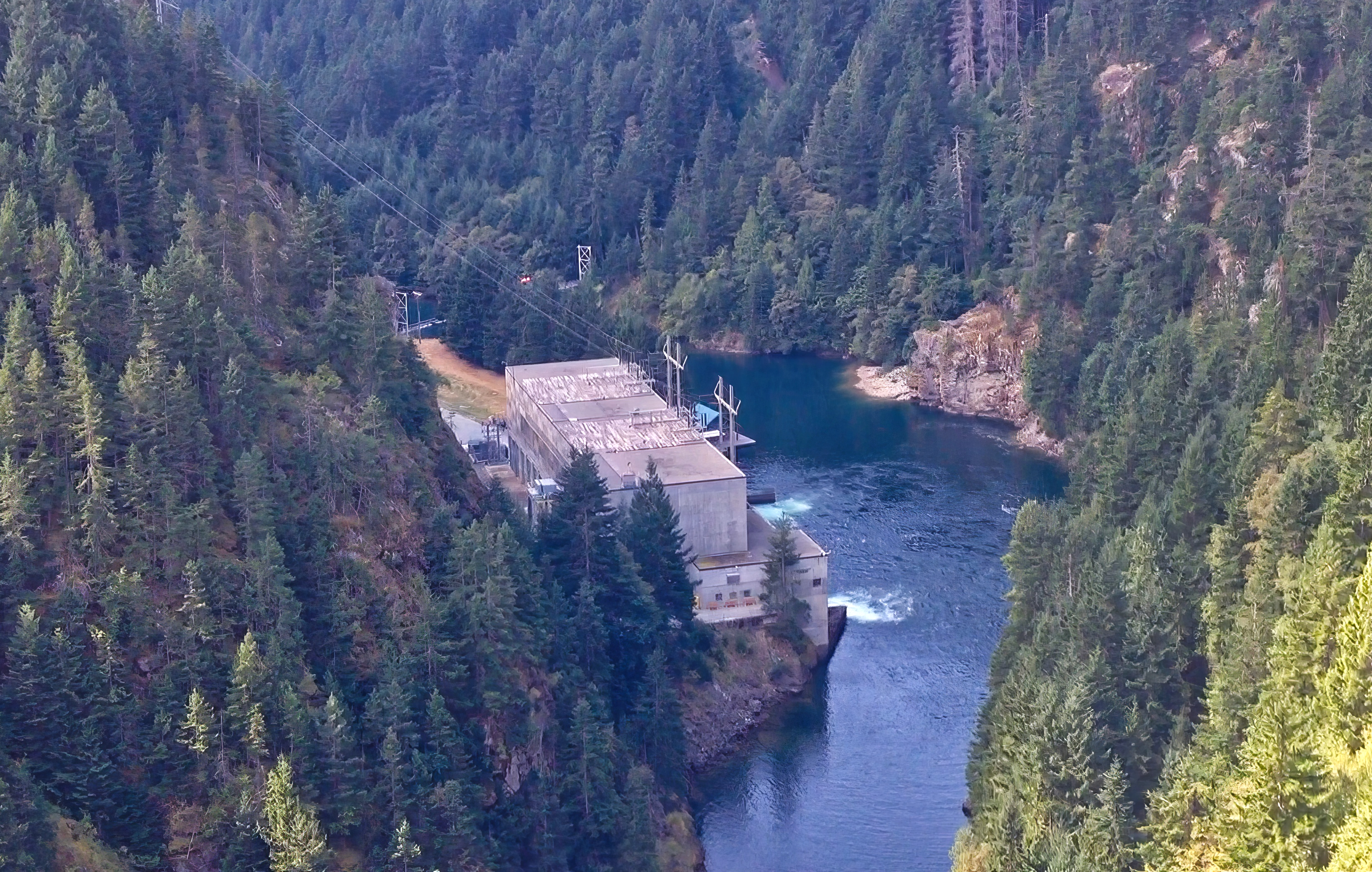
The Ross Dam power plant as seen from Ross Dam

The power plant of Ross Dam is located just downstream of its base and produces 460 MW of power from four hydroelectric turbines. The dam has two over-the-crest spillways on its flanks, each with six individual spillway bays. The capacity of each individual spillway bay at full pool is rated at 10,600 cubic feet per second (300 m^{3}/s), for a total discharge capacity of just over 127,000 cubic feet per second (3,600 m^{3}/s).

== Hydroelectric power capacity ==
Generator	Nameplate Capacity (MW)
41	112.5
42	112.5
43	112.5
44	112.5
Total	450.0

== Climate ==
Climate data for Ross Dam (1991–2020 normals, extremes 1960–present)
Month	Jan	Feb	Mar	Apr	May	Jun	Jul	Aug	Sep	Oct	Nov	Dec	Year
Record high °F (°C)	57 (14)	61 (16)	71 (22)	83 (28)	97 (36)	108 (42)	103 (39)	102 (39)	98 (37)	86 (30)	64 (18)	57 (14)	108 (42)
Mean maximum °F (°C)	47.1 (8.4)	50.3 (10.2)	61.1 (16.2)	72.8 (22.7)	84.0 (28.9)	88.6 (31.4)	95.2 (35.1)	94.3 (34.6)	86.5 (30.3)	70.8 (21.6)	53.7 (12.1)	47.0 (8.3)	97.0 (36.1)
Mean daily maximum °F (°C)	37.5 (3.1)	41.3 (5.2)	47.3 (8.5)	55.7 (13.2)	65.1 (18.4)	69.9 (21.1)	78.6 (25.9)	79.0 (26.1)	70.4 (21.3)	56.0 (13.3)	43.7 (6.5)	37.6 (3.1)	56.8 (13.8)
Daily mean °F (°C)	33.8 (1.0)	35.9 (2.2)	40.2 (4.6)	46.8 (8.2)	54.9 (12.7)	59.9 (15.5)	66.8 (19.3)	67.4 (19.7)	60.4 (15.8)	49.2 (9.6)	39.5 (4.2)	34.0 (1.1)	49.1 (9.5)
Mean daily minimum °F (°C)	30.0 (−1.1)	30.5 (−0.8)	33.2 (0.7)	37.9 (3.3)	44.8 (7.1)	49.9 (9.9)	55.1 (12.8)	55.8 (13.2)	50.4 (10.2)	42.5 (5.8)	35.3 (1.8)	30.5 (−0.8)	41.3 (5.2)
Mean minimum °F (°C)	18.0 (−7.8)	21.5 (−5.8)	25.5 (−3.6)	31.2 (−0.4)	36.4 (2.4)	43.0 (6.1)	48.1 (8.9)	48.9 (9.4)	42.9 (6.1)	33.4 (0.8)	24.9 (−3.9)	19.4 (−7.0)	10.9 (−11.7)
Record low °F (°C)	−1 (−18)	5 (−15)	10 (−12)	27 (−3)	27 (−3)	36 (2)	37 (3)	40 (4)	34 (1)	16 (−9)	7 (−14)	−1 (−18)	−1 (−18)
Average precipitation inches (mm)	9.72 (247)	5.98 (152)	6.37 (162)	3.23 (82)	2.06 (52)	1.68 (43)	0.99 (25)	1.21 (31)	2.50 (64)	6.72 (171)	11.07 (281)	9.23 (234)	60.76 (1,544)
Average snowfall inches (cm)	17.2 (44)	11.9 (30)	7.8 (20)	0.3 (0.76)	0.0 (0.0)	0.0 (0.0)	0.0 (0.0)	0.0 (0.0)	0.0 (0.0)	0.0 (0.0)	5.8 (15)	23.7 (60)	66.7 (169.76)
Average extreme snow depth inches (cm)	12.5 (32)	10.0 (25)	6.9 (18)	0.2 (0.51)	0.0 (0.0)	0.0 (0.0)	0.0 (0.0)	0.0 (0.0)	0.0 (0.0)	0.0 (0.0)	3.0 (7.6)	11.3 (29)	20.7 (53)
Average precipitation days (≥ 0.01 in)	18.6	15.3	18.1	14.5	11.8	11.3	6.3	5.7	10.5	16.4	20.4	18.8	167.7
Average snowy days (≥ 0.1 in)	4.7	3.4	3.1	0.3	0.0	0.0	0.0	0.0	0.0	0.0	1.9	6.6	20
Source 1: NOAA
Source 2: National Weather Service

== See also ==
- List of world's tallest dams
- List of dams in the United States
