= Rockport, Washington =

- CDP
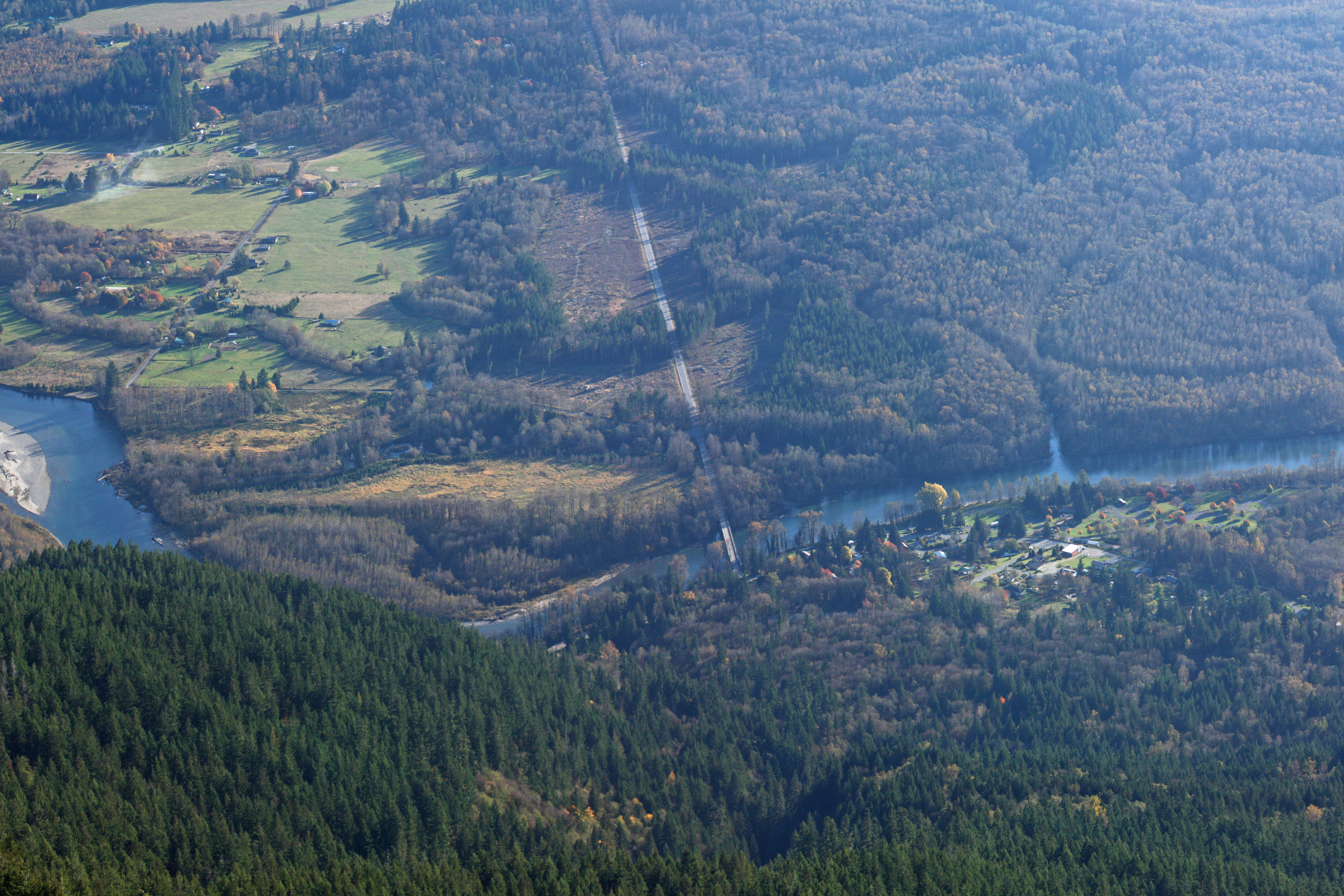
- Rockport (bottom right) lies at the junction of Washington State Route 530 (center) with Washington State Route 20 (hidden by trees).

- Location of Rockport, Washington
- Coordinates: 48°29′06″N 121°36′23″W
- Country: United States
- State: Washington
- County: Skagit

Area
  - Total: 0.39 sq mi (1.0 km^{2})
  - Land: 0.39 sq mi (1.0 km^{2})
  - Water: 0 sq mi (0.0 km^{2})
- Elevation: 220 ft (67 m)

Population (2020)
  - Total: 90
  - Density: 272/sq mi (105.1/km^{2})
- Time zone: UTC-8 (Pacific (PST))
  - Summer (DST): UTC-7 (PDT)
- ZIP Code: 98283
- Area code: 360, 564
- FIPS code: 53-59250
- GNIS feature ID: 2409196

Rockport is a census-designated place (CDP) in Skagit County, Washington, United States. As of the 2020 census, Rockport had a population of 90. It is included in the Mount Vernon–Anacortes, Washington Metropolitan Statistical Area.

Based on per capita income, Rockport ranks 48th of 522 areas in the state of Washington to be ranked.

== Geography ==
According to the United States Census Bureau, the CDP has a total area of 0.4 square miles (1.0 km^{2}), all of it land.

=== Climate ===
The climate in this area has mild differences between highs and lows, and there is adequate rainfall year-round. According to the Köppen Climate Classification system, Rockport has a marine west coast climate, abbreviated "Cfb" on climate maps.

Climate data for Rockport, WA (1991-2020)
Month	Jan	Feb	Mar	Apr	May	Jun	Jul	Aug	Sep	Oct	Nov	Dec	Year
Mean daily maximum °F (°C)	42.4 (5.8)	46.6 (8.1)	51.6 (10.9)	58.7 (14.8)	66.5 (19.2)	70.3 (21.3)	77.4 (25.2)	78.5 (25.8)	71.8 (22.1)	59.2 (15.1)	47.9 (8.8)	41.4 (5.2)	59.4 (15.2)
Daily mean °F (°C)	37.7 (3.2)	39.9 (4.4)	43.6 (6.4)	49.0 (9.4)	55.6 (13.1)	59.6 (15.3)	64.7 (18.2)	65.3 (18.5)	60.1 (15.6)	50.8 (10.4)	42.4 (5.8)	37.2 (2.9)	50.5 (10.3)
Mean daily minimum °F (°C)	32.9 (0.5)	33.1 (0.6)	35.5 (1.9)	39.2 (4.0)	44.5 (6.9)	48.9 (9.4)	51.9 (11.1)	52.2 (11.2)	48.5 (9.2)	42.4 (5.8)	36.9 (2.7)	33.0 (0.6)	41.6 (5.3)
Average precipitation inches (mm)	11.32 (288)	7.09 (180)	8.14 (207)	5.24 (133)	3.74 (95)	3.00 (76)	1.52 (39)	1.72 (44)	3.65 (93)	8.05 (204)	12.51 (318)	10.81 (275)	76.79 (1,952)
Average snowfall inches (cm)	19.0 (48.3)	9.2 (23.4)	4.3 (10.9)	0.5 (1.3)	0.0 (0.0)	0.0 (0.0)	0.0 (0.0)	0.0 (0.0)	0.0 (0.0)	0.0 (0.0)	3.5 (8.9)	14.8 (37.6)	51.3 (130.4)
Average precipitation days	21	17	20	18	15	13	8	7	11	17	21	21	189
Average snowy days	4.6	2.8	1.8	0.2	0.1	0	0	0	0	0	1.4	5.2	16.1
Average dew point °F (°C)	33.3 (0.7)	32.6 (0.3)	35.1 (1.7)	38.1 (3.4)	43.0 (6.1)	47.1 (8.4)	49.9 (9.9)	50.2 (10.1)	46.8 (8.2)	41.7 (5.4)	37.2 (2.9)	33.1 (0.6)	40.7 (4.8)
Source 1: PRISM Climate Group
Source 2: Weatherbase(snow-days with precipitation)

== Demographics ==
Historical population
Census	Pop.	Note	%±
2000	102		—
2010	109		6.9%
2020	90		−17.4%
U.S. Decennial Census; 1970 1980 1990; 2000 2010

Rockport first appeared as a census designated place in the 2000 U.S. census.

=== Racial and ethnic composition ===
Rockport CDP, Washington – Racial and ethnic composition Note: the US Census treats Hispanic/Latino as an ethnic category. This table excludes Latinos from the racial categories and assigns them to a separate category. Hispanics/Latinos may be of any race.
Race / Ethnicity (NH = Non-Hispanic)	Pop 2000	Pop 2010	Pop 2020	% 2000	% 2010	% 2020
White alone (NH)	99	105	81	97.06%	96.33%	90.00%
Black or African American alone (NH)	0	0	1	0.00%	0.00%	1.11%
Native American or Alaska Native alone (NH)	2	1	0	1.96%	0.92%	0.00%
Asian alone (NH)	0	0	0	0.00%	0.00%	0.00%
Native Hawaiian or Pacific Islander alone (NH)	0	0	0	0.00%	0.00%	0.00%
Other race alone (NH)	0	0	2	0.00%	0.00%	2.22%
Mixed race or Multiracial (NH)	0	1	5	0.00%	0.92%	5.56%
Hispanic or Latino (any race)	1	2	1	0.98%	1.83%	1.11%
Total	102	109	90	100.00%	100.00%	100.00%

=== 2000 census ===
As of the census of 2000, there were 102 people, 39 households, and 26 families residing in the CDP. The population density was 272.2 people per square mile (106.4/km^{2}). There were 54 housing units at an average density of 144.1/sq mi (56.3/km^{2}). The racial makeup of the CDP was 98.04% White and 1.96% Native American. Hispanic or Latino of any race were 0.98% of the population.

There were 39 households, out of which 25.6% had children under the age of 18 living with them, 51.3% were married couples living together, 12.8% had a female householder with no husband present, and 33.3% were non-families. 25.6% of all households were made up of individuals, and 2.6% had someone living alone who was 65 years of age or older. The average household size was 2.62 and the average family size was 3.12.

In the CDP, the age distribution of the population shows 30.4% under the age of 18, 7.8% from 18 to 24, 27.5% from 25 to 44, 20.6% from 45 to 64, and 13.7% who were 65 years of age or older. The median age was 34 years. For every 100 females, there were 104.0 males. For every 100 females age 18 and over, there were 102.9 males.

The median income for a household in the CDP was $48,750, and the median income for a family was $69,250. Males had a median income of $36,250 versus $26,250 for females. The per capita income for the CDP was $28,372. None of the population or families were below the poverty line.
