= Mount Payne =

Mountain in the country of Canada

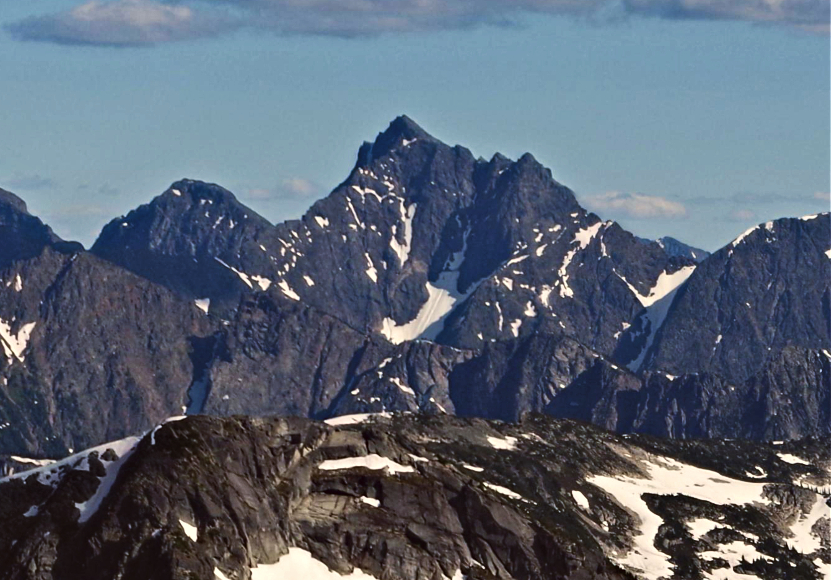
- Mount Payne seen from Eaton Peak

Highest point
- Elevation: 2,468 m (8,097 ft)
- Prominence: 378 m (1,240 ft)
- Parent peak: Silvertip Mountain
- Listing: Mountains of British Columbia
- Coordinates: 49°10′04″N 121°16′29″W

Geography
- Location within British Columbia Location within Canada
- Interactive map of Mount Payne
- Location: British Columbia, Canada
- District: Yale Division Yale Land District
- Parent range: Skagit Range; Canadian Cascades
- Topo map: NTS 92H3 Skagit River

Geology
- Mountain type: Intrusive
- Rock type: granitic

Climbing
- First ascent: 1950 J. Bussell, H. Genschorek, I. Kay, A. Melville, W. Sparling
- Easiest route: Scramble via south ridge

Mount Payne is a 2,468-metre (8,097-foot) mountain summit located in the Canadian Cascades of southwestern British Columbia, Canada. It is situated 27 km (17 mi) southeast of Hope, 14 km (9 mi) northeast of Chilliwack Lake, and 4 km (2 mi) west of Silvertip Mountain, which is its nearest higher peak. Following Silvertip, Mount Payne is the second-highest summit in the Hope Mountains, a subset of the Skagit Range. The peak was first climbed in 1950 by J. Bussell, H. Genschorek, I. Kay, A. Melville, and W. Sparling. The peak was named for Damasus Payne, a Benedictine monk and mountaineer who fell to his death on Edge Peak in 1978. Payne was responsible for naming mountains such as Mount Rohr and Mount Duke. He also carried all the materials for mass and communion up to the summit of Slesse Mountain to perform a ceremony to honor the victims of Trans-Canada Air Lines Flight 810. Mt. Payne's name was officially adopted May 7, 1984 by the Geographical Names Board of Canada. Precipitation runoff from the peak drains into headwaters of the Sumallo River and into the Klesilkwa River, which is a tributary of the Skagit .

== Geology ==
Mount Payne is related to the Chilliwack batholith, which intruded the region 26 to 29 million years ago after the major orogenic episodes in the region. This is part of the Pemberton Volcanic Belt, an eroded volcanic belt that formed as a result of subduction of the Farallon Plate starting 29 million years ago.

During the Pleistocene period dating back over two million years ago, glaciation advancing and retreating repeatedly scoured the landscape leaving deposits of rock debris. The U-shaped cross section of the river valleys is a result of recent glaciation. Uplift and faulting in combination with glaciation have been the dominant processes which have created the tall peaks and deep valleys of the North Cascades area.

The North Cascades features some of the most rugged topography in the Cascade Range with craggy peaks and ridges, deep glacial valleys, and granite spires. Geological events occurring many years ago created the diverse topography and drastic elevation changes over the Cascade Range leading to various climate differences which lead to vegetation variety defining the ecoregions in this area.

== Climate ==
Most weather fronts originate in the Pacific Ocean, and travel east toward the Cascade Range where they are forced upward by the range (Orographic lift), causing them to drop their moisture in the form of rain or snowfall. As a result, the Cascade Mountains experience high precipitation, especially during the winter months in the form of snowfall. Temperatures can drop below −20 °C (−4 °F) with wind chill factors below −30 °C (−22 °F). The months July through September offer the most favorable weather for climbing Mount Payne.

== Gallery ==
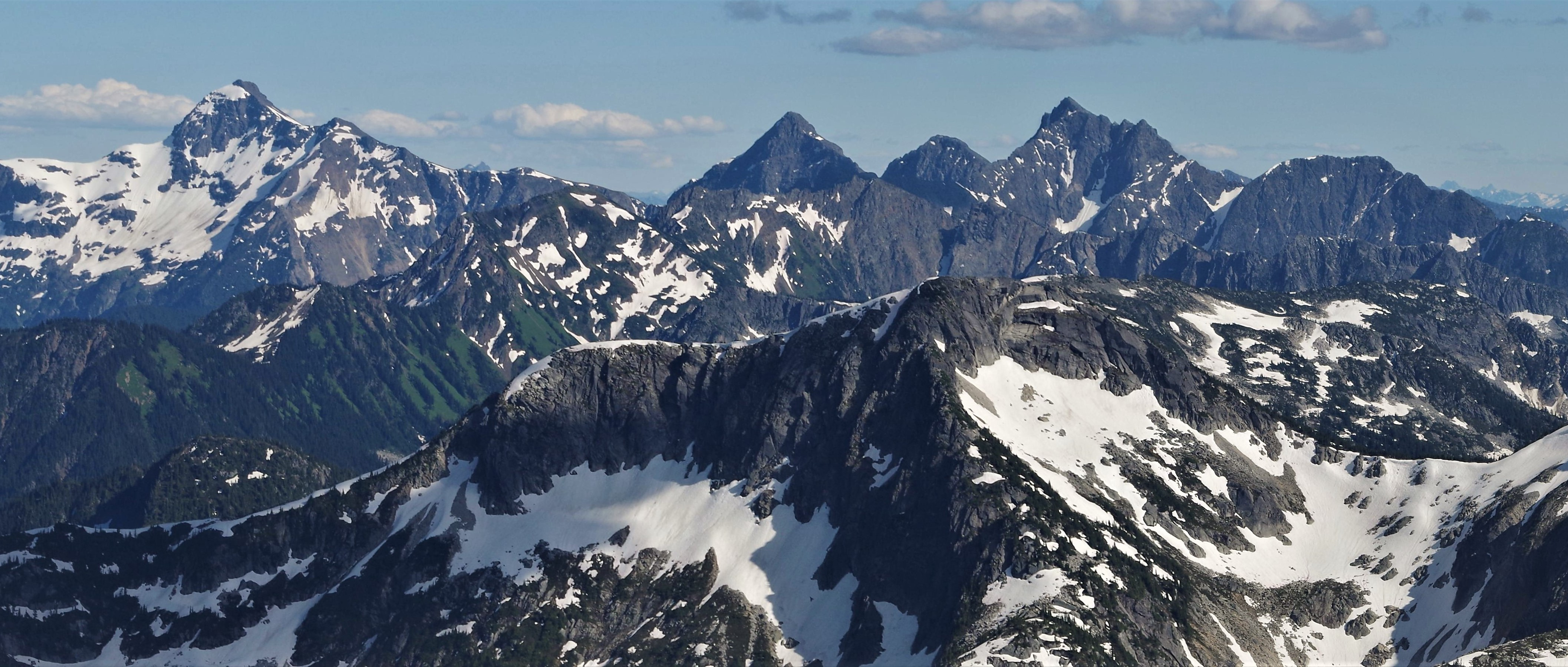
Silvertip Mountain (left), Mount Rideout (centered on skyline), Mount Payne (right) viewed from the north

== See also ==
- Geography of the North Cascades
