= List of wildlife of the Skagit River Basin =

This is a list of wildlife found in the Skagit River basin of the Pacific Northwest.

== Fish ==
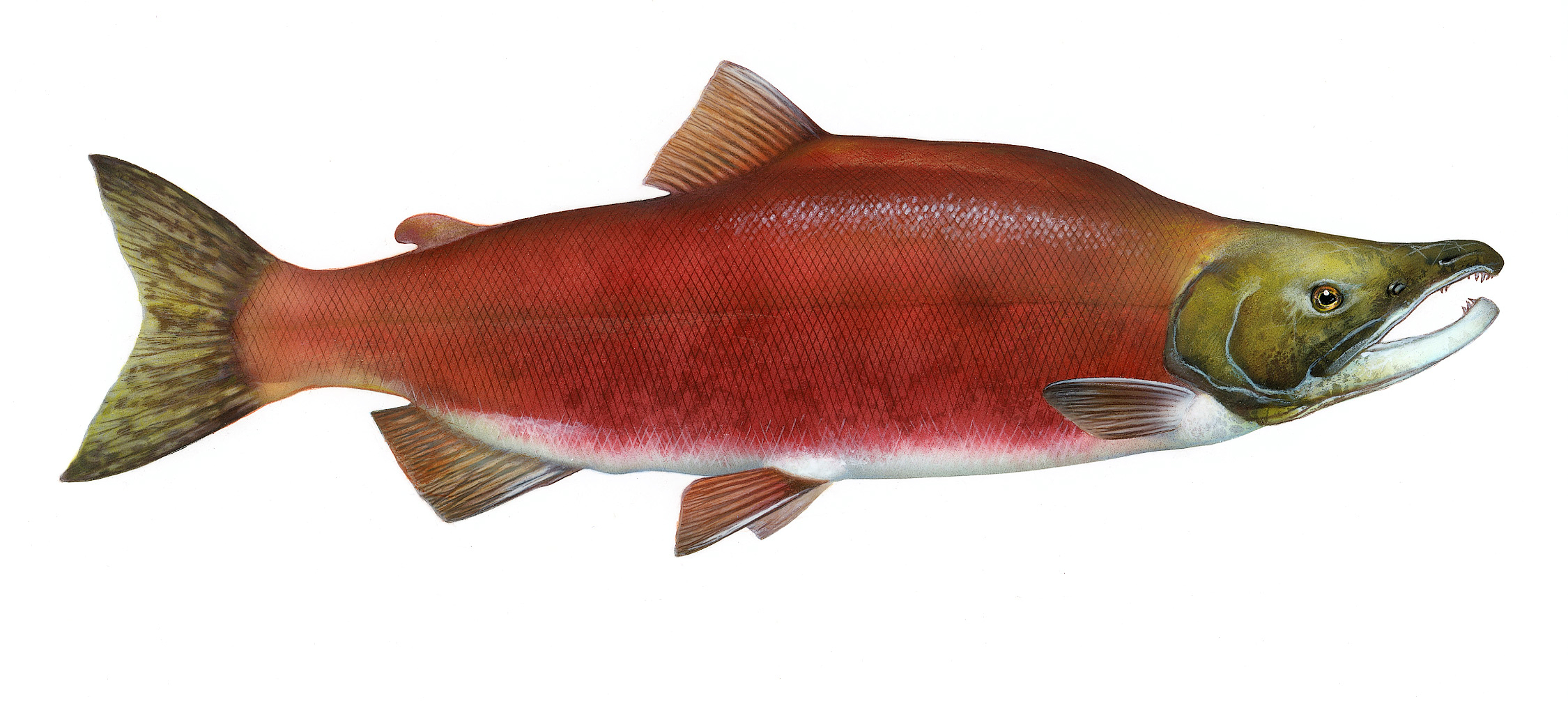
Sockeye salmon

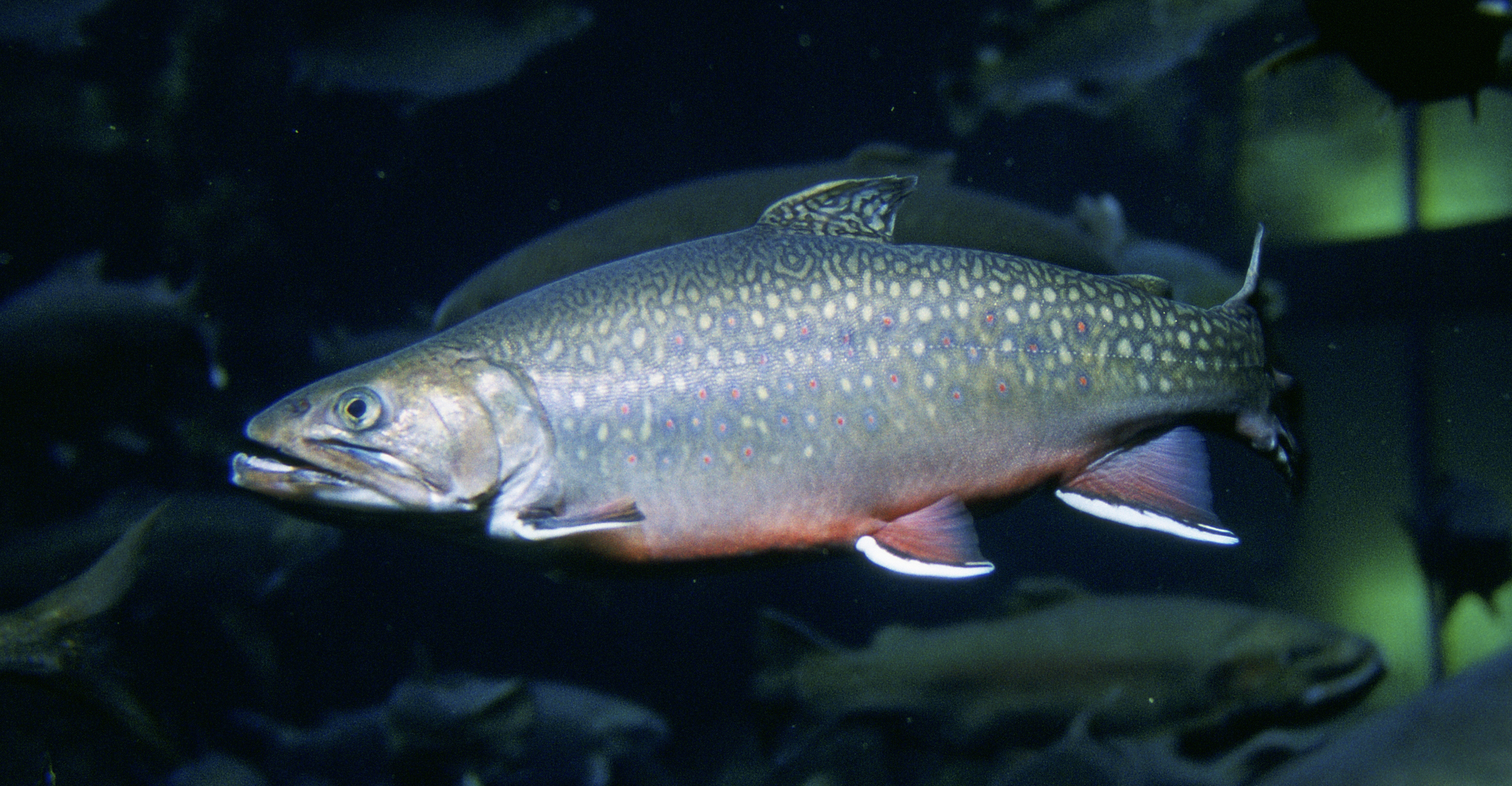
Brook trout

Salmon and trout

- Sockeye salmon
- Chinook salmon
- Chum salmon
- Pink salmon
- Coho salmon
- Steelhead (coastal rainbow trout)
- Coastal cutthroat trout
- Dolly Varden trout
- Golden trout
- Brook trout
- Bull trout
- Mountain whitefish

Minnows, carp

- Peamouth chub
- Northern pikeminnow (formerly known as northern squawfish)
- Longnose dace
- Redside shiner

Suckers

- Longnose sucker
- Largescale sucker
- Bridgelip sucker

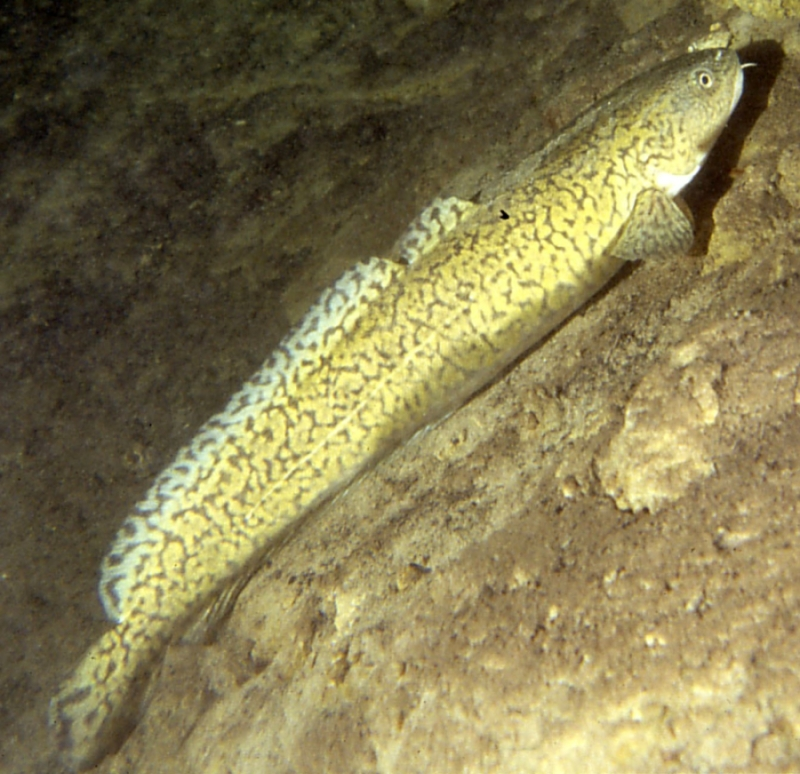
Burbot

Codfishes

- Burbot (ling)

Sculpins

- Slimy sculpin
- Torrent sculpin
- Coast range sculpin
- Prickly sculpin

Sticklebacks

- Three-spined stickleback

== Reptiles and amphibians ==
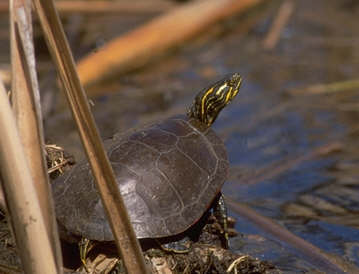
Painted turtle

Turtles

- Painted turtle

Lizards

- Northern alligator lizard
- Western fence lizard
- Side-blotched lizard

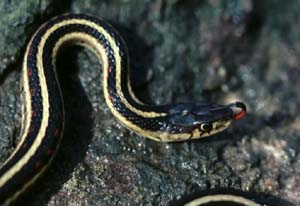
Common garter snake

Snakes

- Rubber boa
- Western garter snake
- Common garter snake
- Northwestern garter snake
- Racer
- Gopher snake

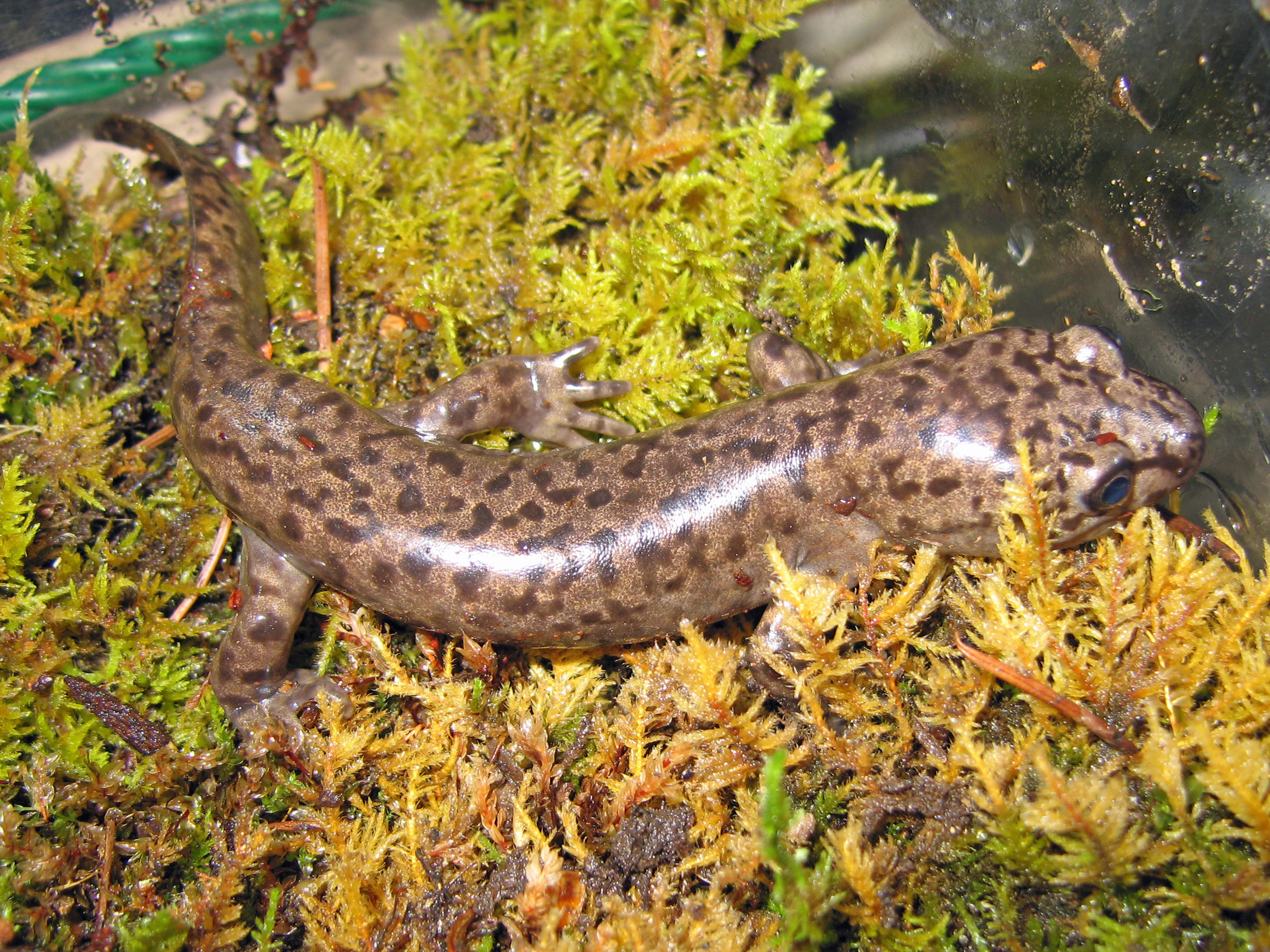
Pacific giant salamander

Salamanders

- Northwestern salamander
- Long-toed salamander
- Pacific giant salamander
- Rough-skinned newt
- Western redback salamander
- Van Dyke's salamander
- Cope's giant salamander
- Olympic salamander
- Ensatina

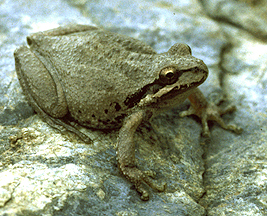
Pacific tree frog

Frogs and toads

- Pacific treefrog
- Tailed frog
- Red-legged frog
- Cascades frog
- Spotted frog
- Bullfrog
- Western toad

== Mammals ==
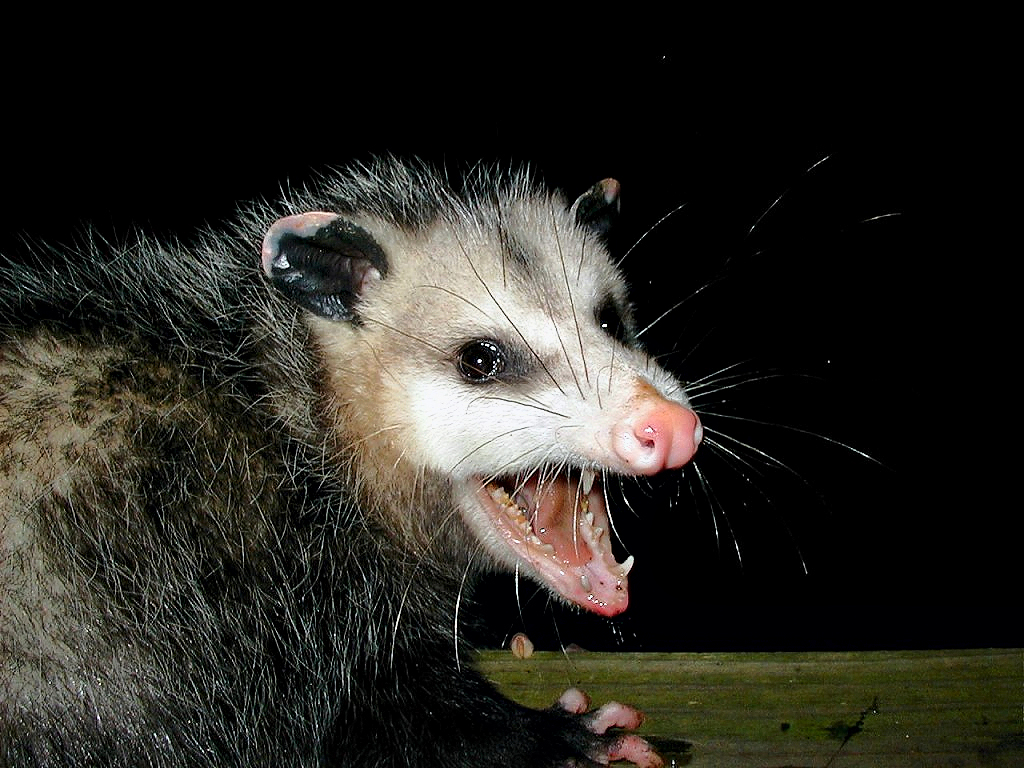
Opossum

Opossums

- Opossum

Shrews

- Masked shrew
- Vagrant shrew
- Dusky shrew
- Northern water shrew
- Pacific water shrew
- Trowbridge's shrew

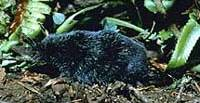
American shrew mole

Moles

- Shrew-mole
- Coast mole
- Townsend's mole

Bats

- California myotis
- Yuma myotis
- Little brown myotis
- Long-eared myotis
- Long-legged myotis
- Hoary bat
- Townsend's big-eared bat
- Silver-haired bat
- Big brown bat

Pikas

- Pika

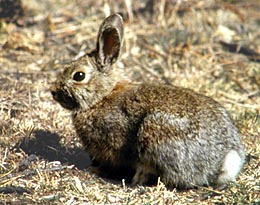
Snowshoe hare

Rabbits and hares

- Eastern cottontail
- Snowshoe hare

Mountain beaver

- Mountain beaver

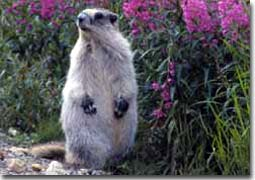
Hoary marmot

Chipmunks, marmots, squirrels

- Yellow-pine chipmunk
- Townsend's chipmunk
- Hoary marmot
- Cascade golden-mantled ground squirrel
- Western gray squirrel
- Fox squirrel (introduced)
- Douglas squirrel
- Northern flying squirrel

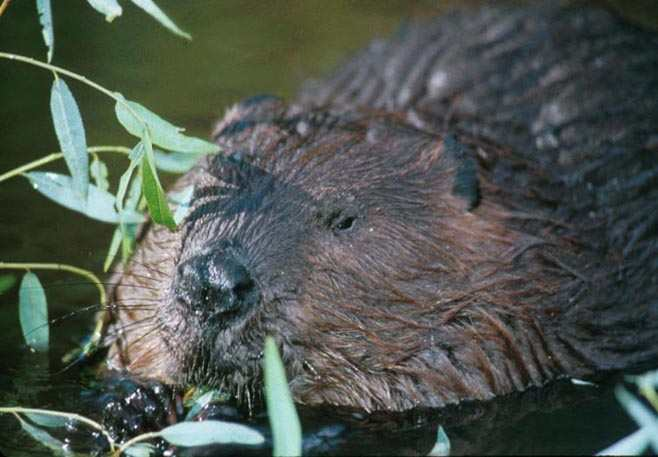
Beaver

Beavers

- Beaver

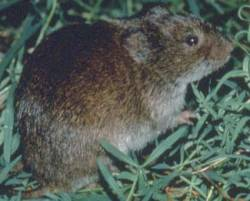
Meadow vole

Mice, woodrats, voles

- Deer mouse
- Bushy-tailed woodrat
- Red-backed vole
- Heather vole
- Meadow vole
- Townsend's vole
- Long-tailed vole
- Creeping vole
- Water vole
- Muskrat
- Northern bog lemming
- Norway rat (introduced)
- Black rat (introduced)
- House mouse (introduced)
- Pacific jumping mouse

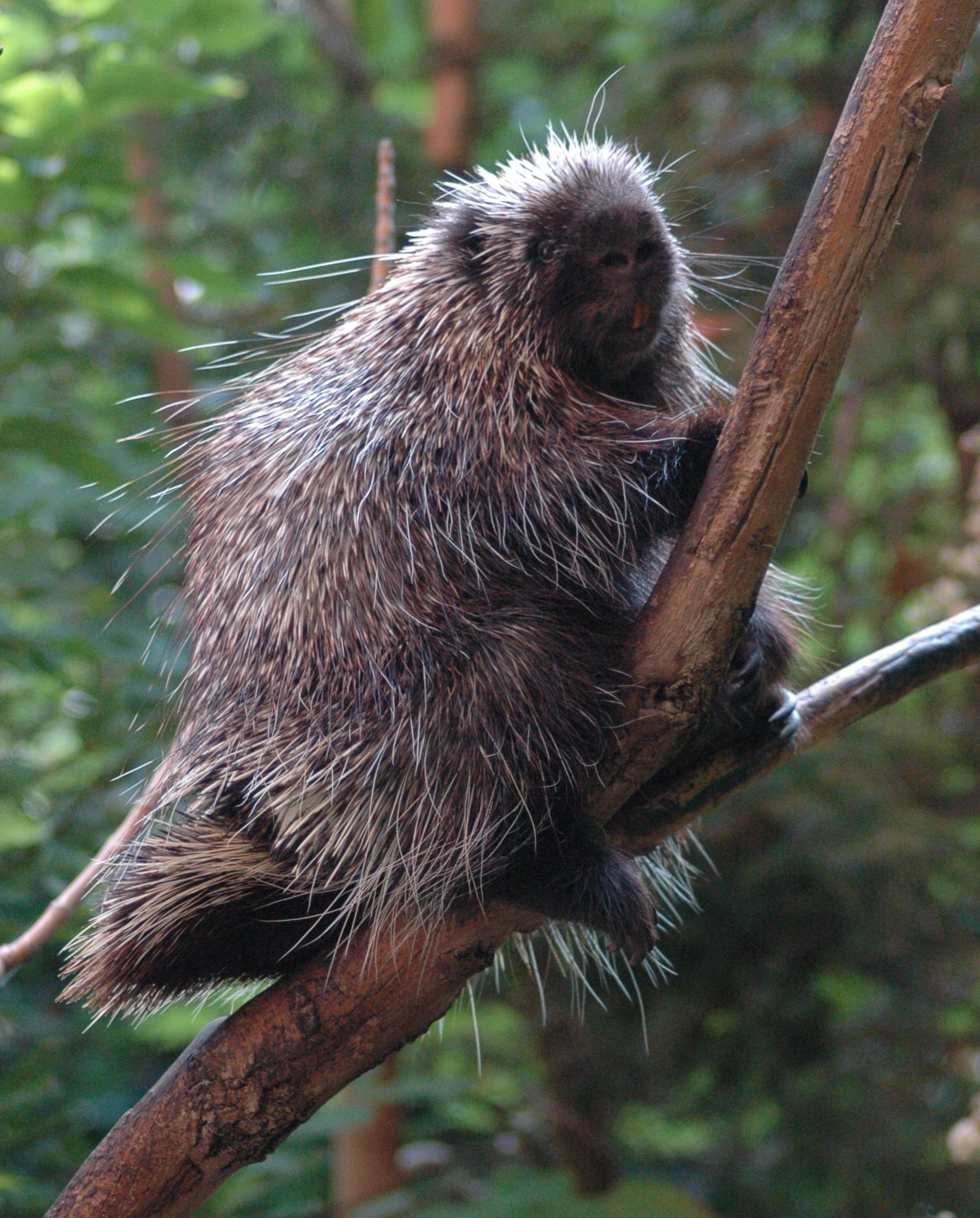
Porcupine

Porcupines

- Porcupine

Nutrias

- Nutria (introduced)

Coyotes, wolves, foxes

- Coyote
- Gray wolf (endangered)
- Red fox

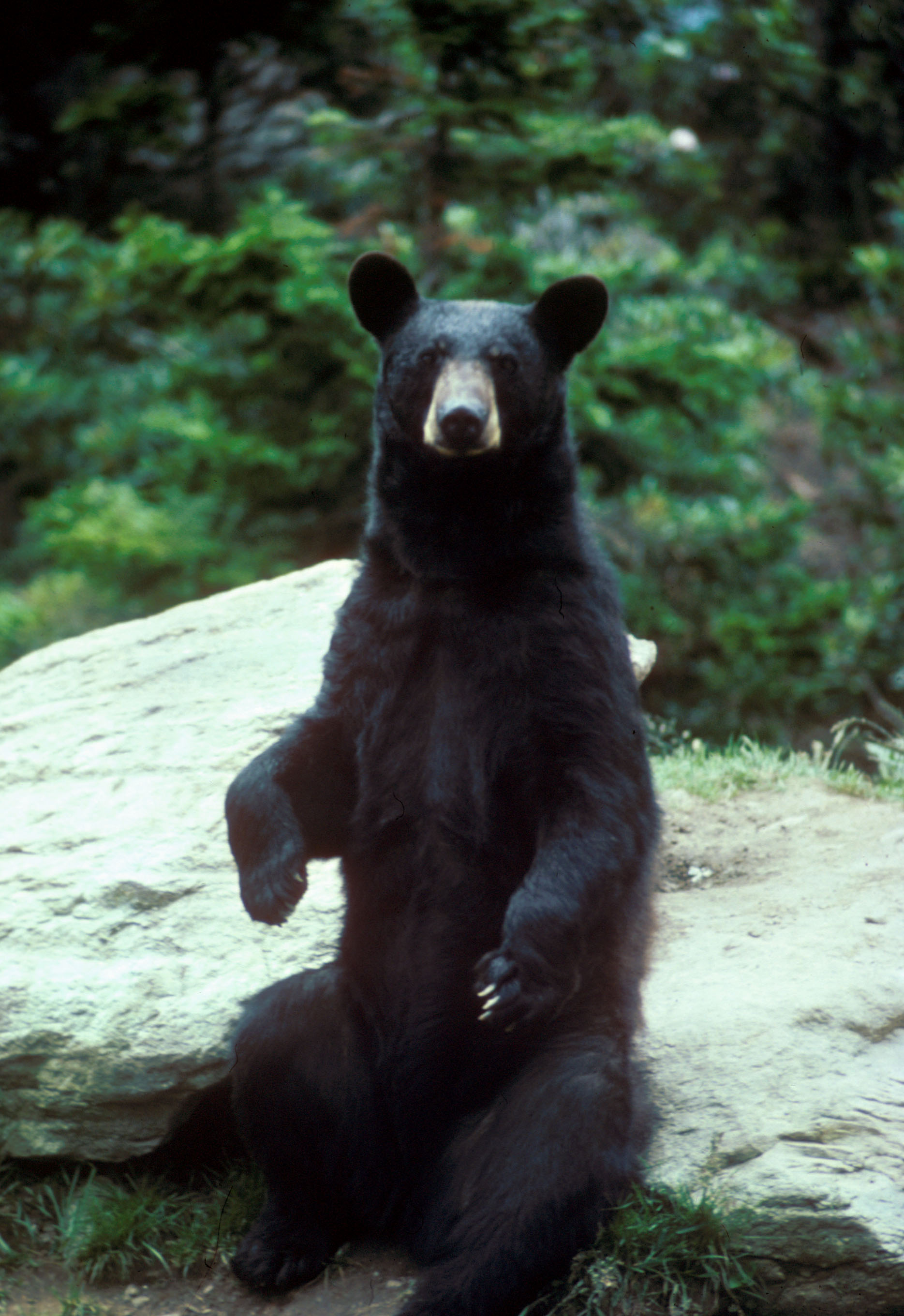
Black bear

Bears

- Black bear
- Grizzly bear (threatened)

Raccoons

- Raccoon

Weasels

- Marten
- Fisher
- Ermine
- Long-tailed weasel
- Mink
- Wolverine
- Striped skunk
- Western spotted skunk
- River otter

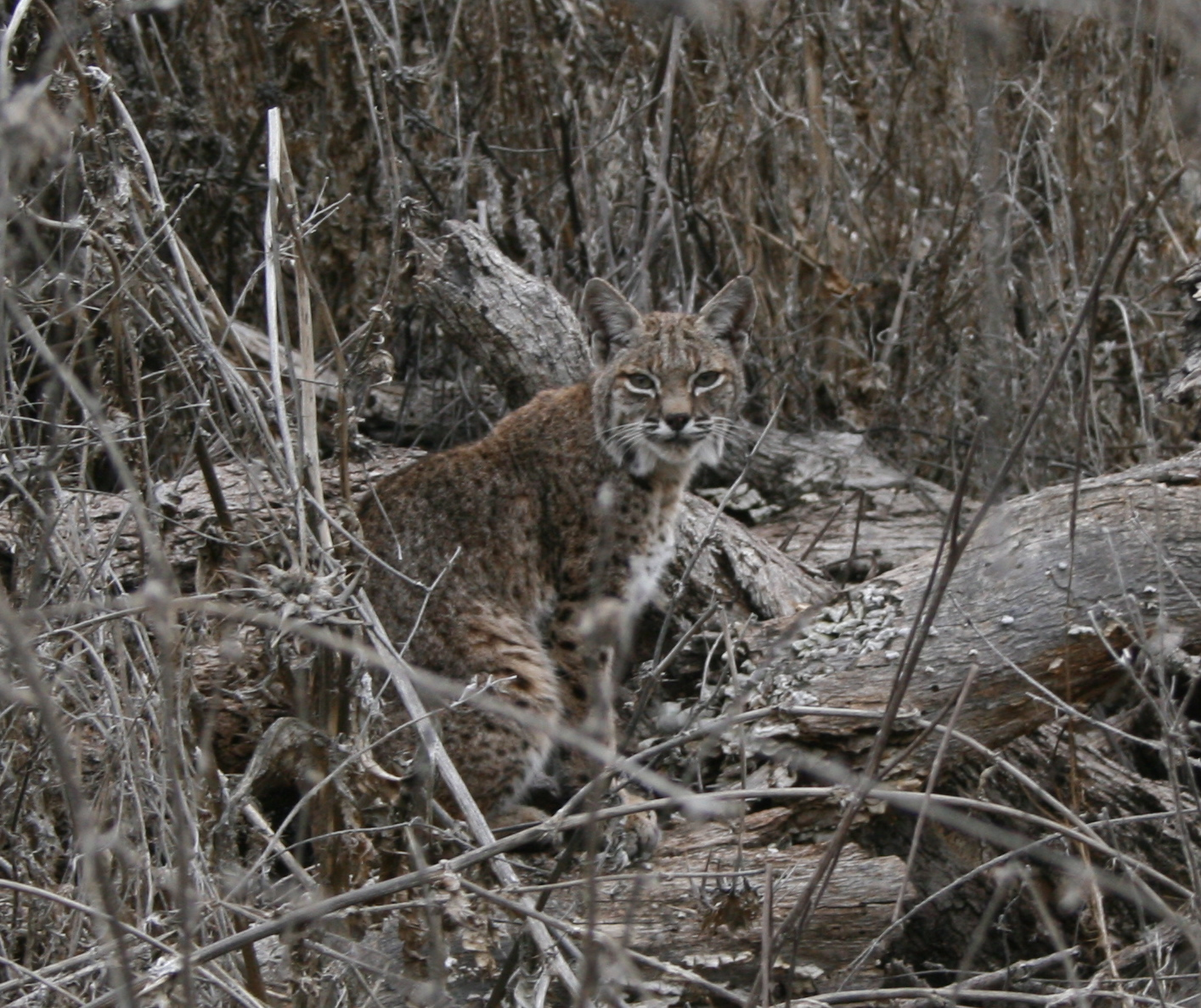
Bobcat

Cats

- Mountain lion
- Lynx
- Bobcat

Elk, deer, moose

- Elk
- Mule deer
- White-tailed deer
- Moose

Goats

- Mountain goats

== Birds ==
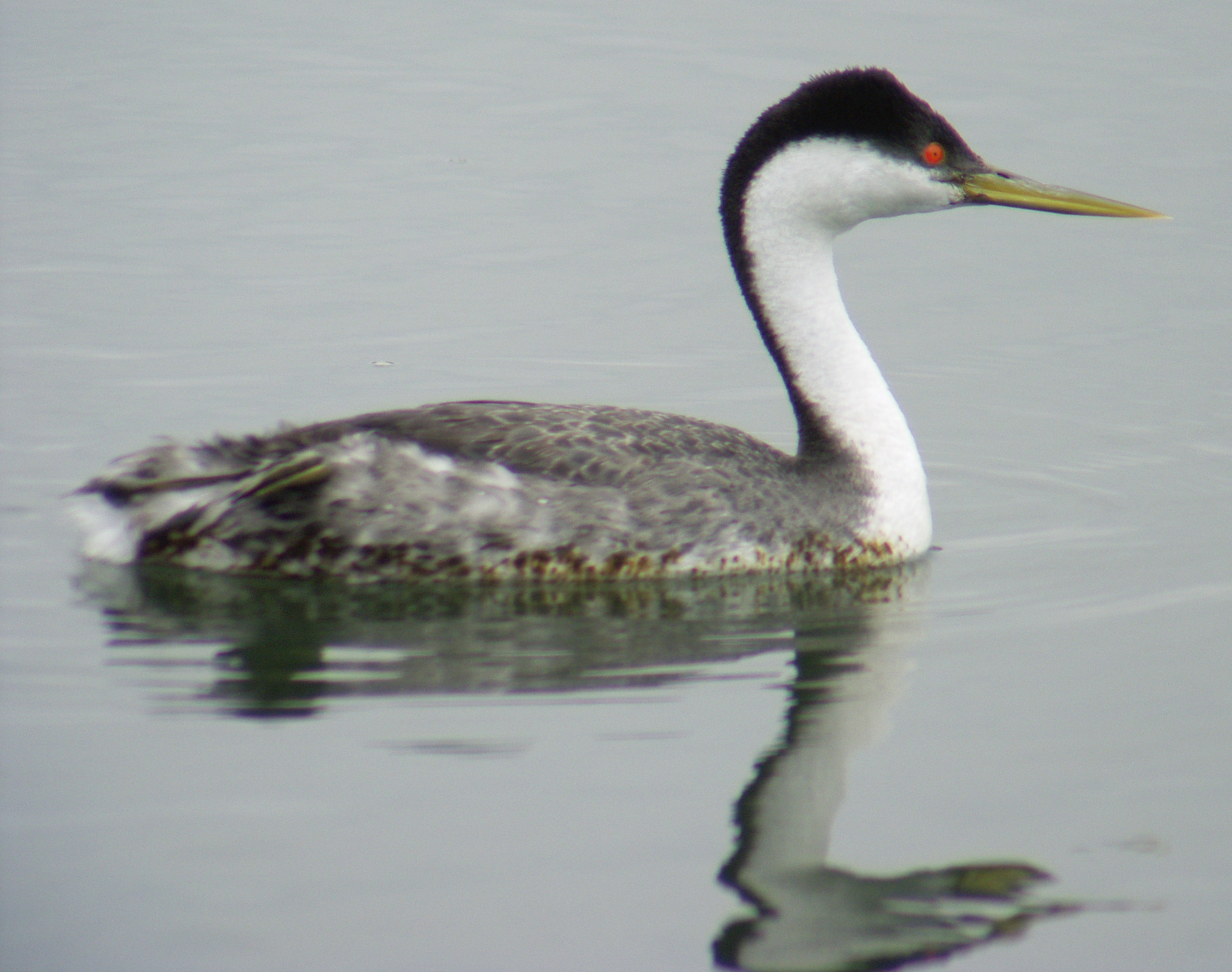
Western grebe

Loons

- Common loon

Grebes

- Pied-billed grebe
- Horned grebe
- Eared grebe
- Western grebe

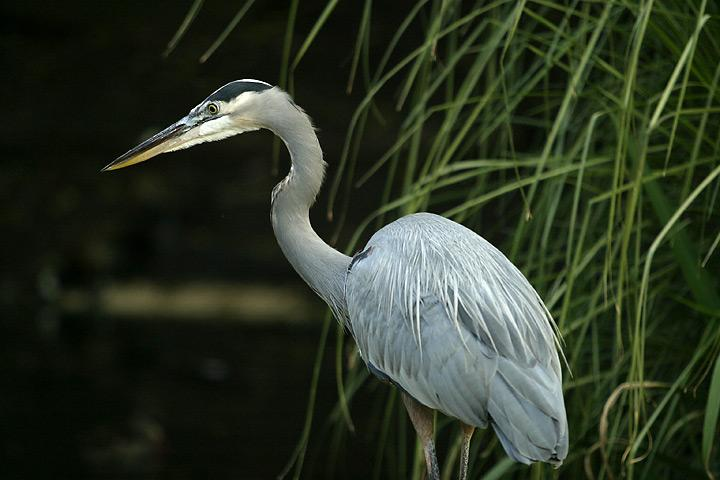
Great blue heron

Herons and bitterns

- Great blue heron
- Green-backed heron

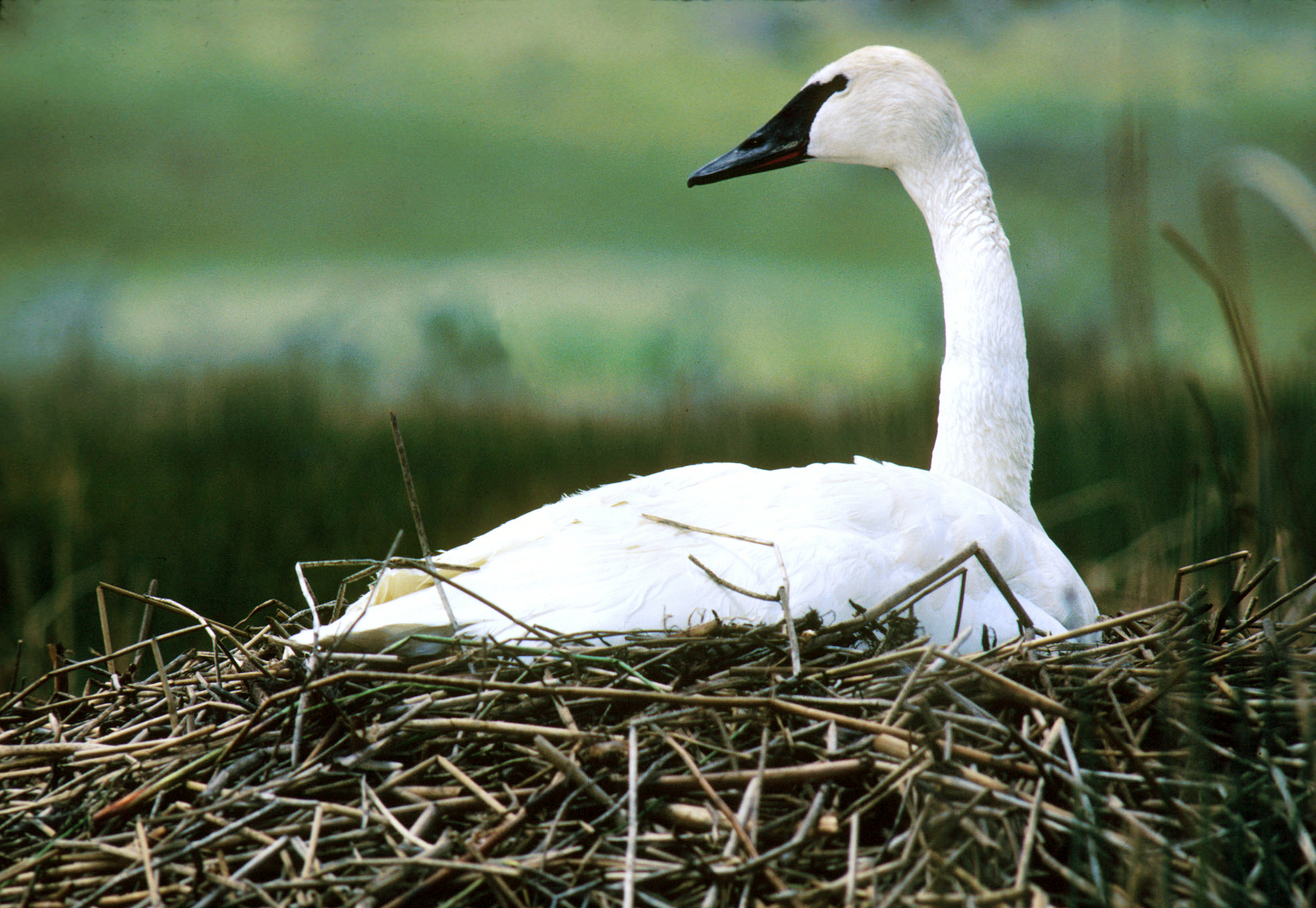
Trumpeter swan

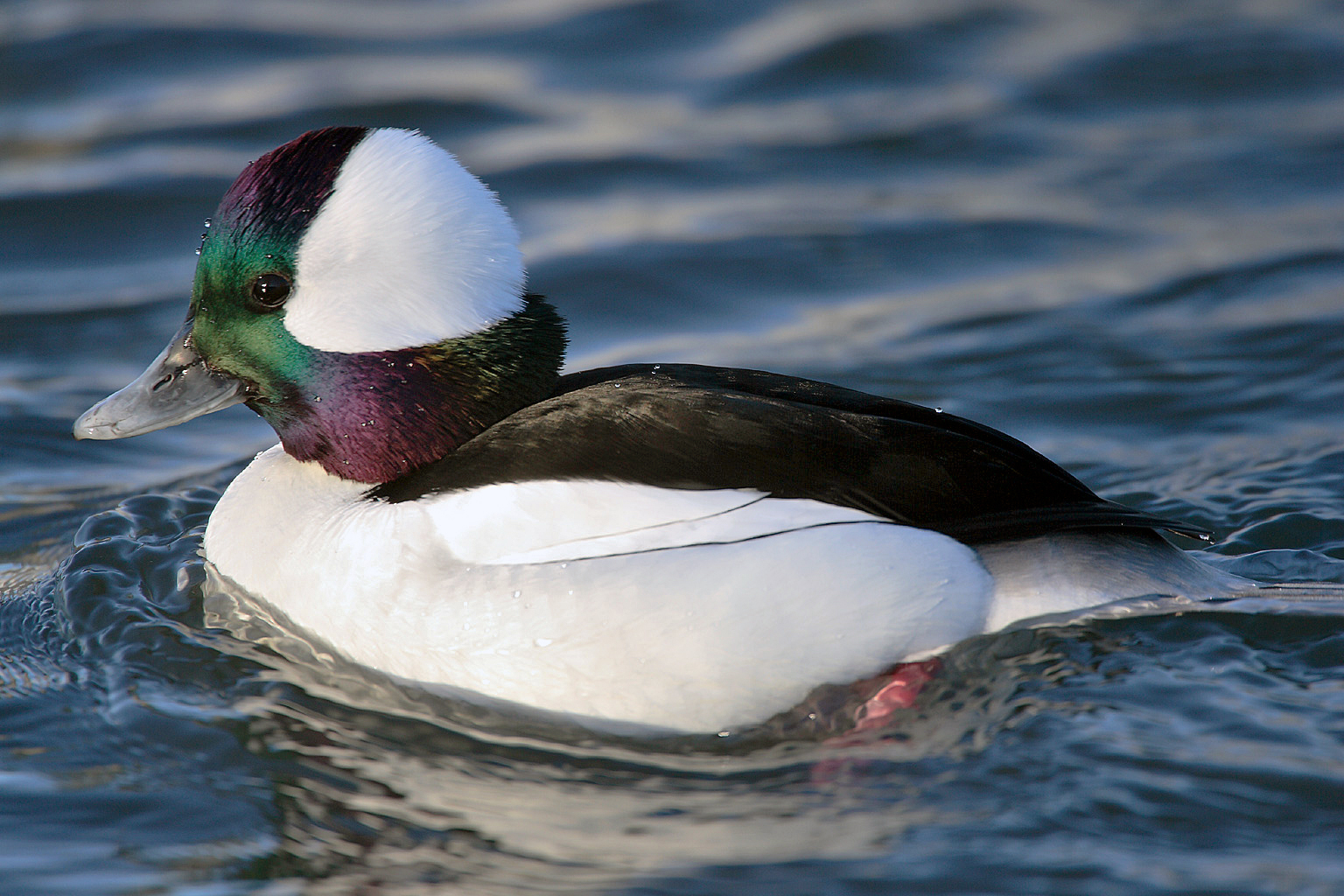
Bufflehead

Swans, geese, ducks

- Tundra swan
- Trumpeter swan
- Snow goose
- Canada goose
- Wood duck
- Mallard
- Northern pintail
- Green-winged teal
- Cinnamon teal
- Northern shoveler
- Gadwall
- American wigeon
- Redhead
- Ring-necked duck
- Greater scaup
- Lesser scaup
- Harlequin duck
- Common goldeneye
- Barrow's goldeneye
- Bufflehead
- Hooded merganser
- Red-breasted merganser
- Ruddy duck

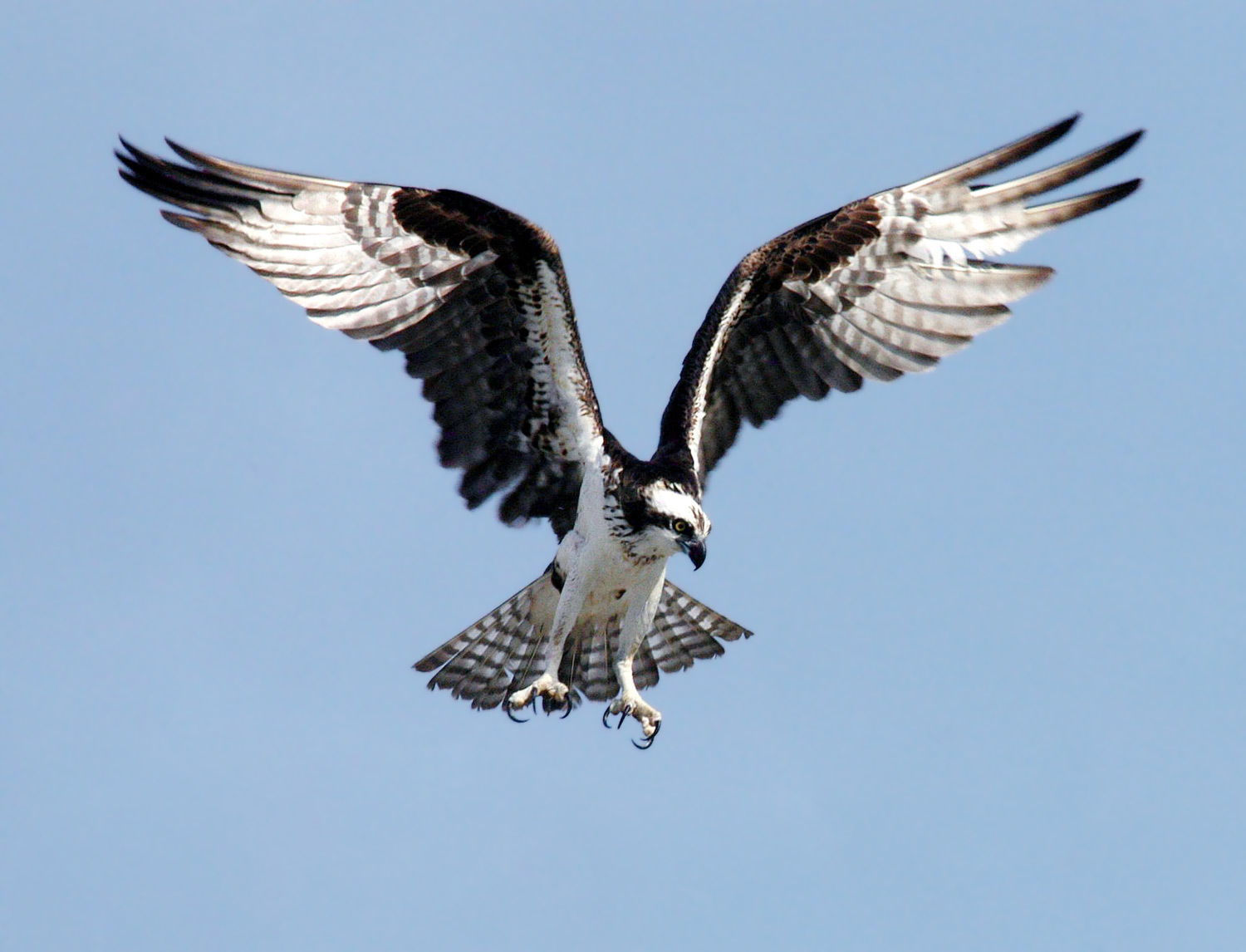
Osprey

Raptors

- Turkey vulture
- Osprey
- Bald eagle
- Northern harrier
- Sharp-shinned hawk
- Cooper's hawk
- Northern goshawk
- Red-tailed hawk
- Rough-legged hawk
- Golden eagle
- American kestrel
- Merlin
- Peregrine falcon
- Prairie falcon

Grouse, ptarmigan, quail

- Spruce grouse
- Sooty grouse
- White-tailed ptarmigan
- Ruffled grouse
- California grouse (introduced)

Rails and coots

- Sora
- American coot

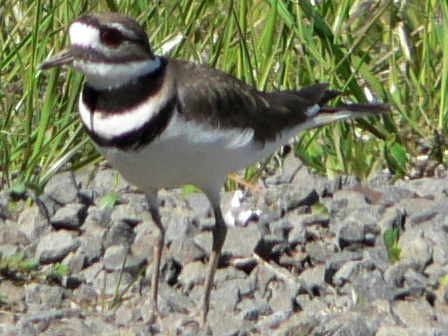
Killdeer

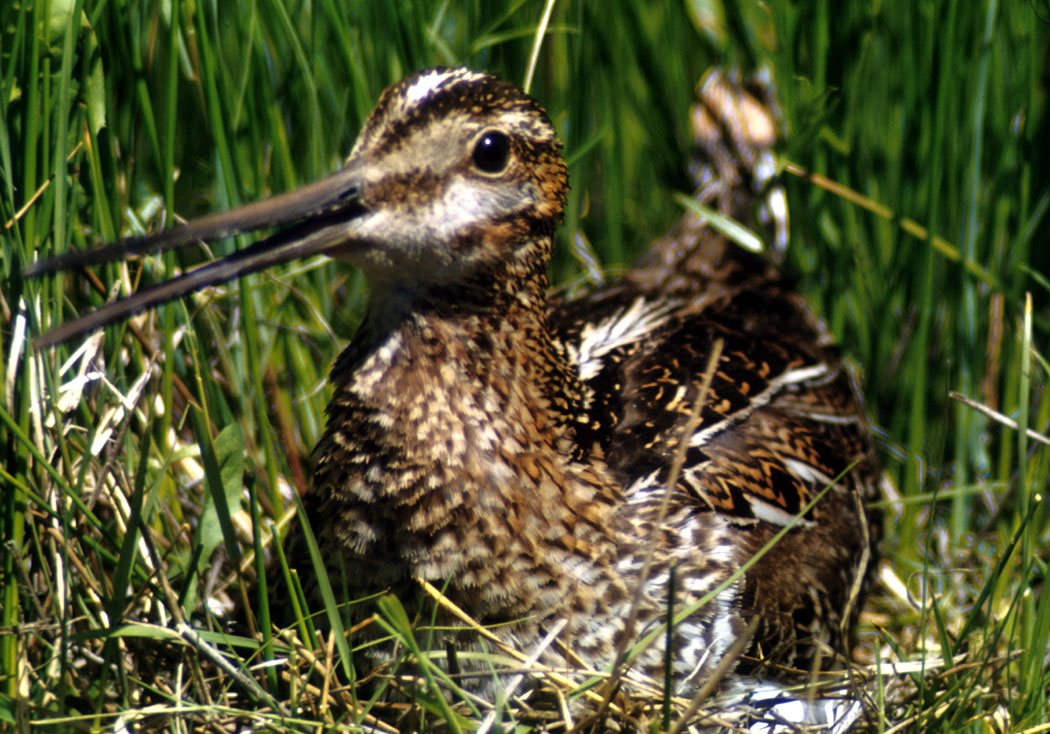
Common snipe

Shorebirds

- Killdeer
- Lesser yellowlegs
- Greater yellowlegs
- Solitary sandpiper
- Spotted sandpiper
- Pectoral sandpiper
- Western sandpiper
- Least sandpiper
- Dunlin
- Baird's sandpiper
- Common snipe
- Wilson's phalarope
- Red-necked phalarope

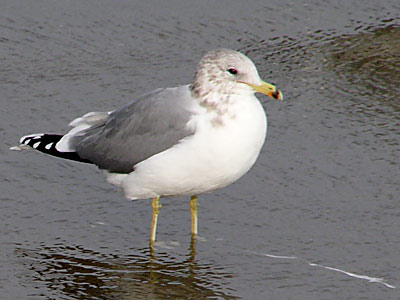
California gull

Gulls and terns

- Bonaparte's gull
- Mew gull
- Ring-billed gull
- California gull
- glaucous-winged gull
- Common tern

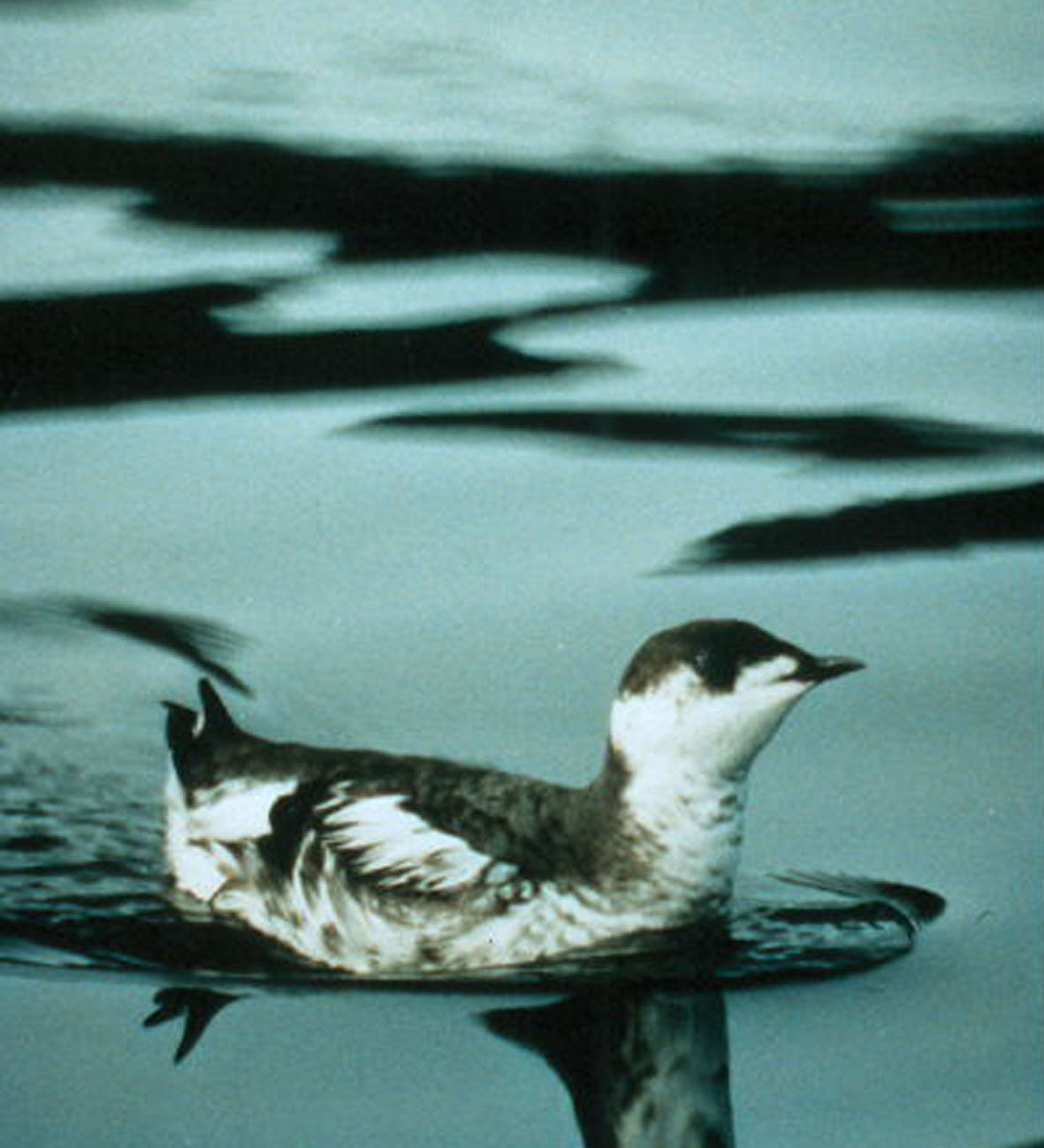
Marbled murrelet

Alcids

- Marbled murrelet

Pigeons and doves

- Rock dove
- Band-tailed pigeon
- Mourning dove

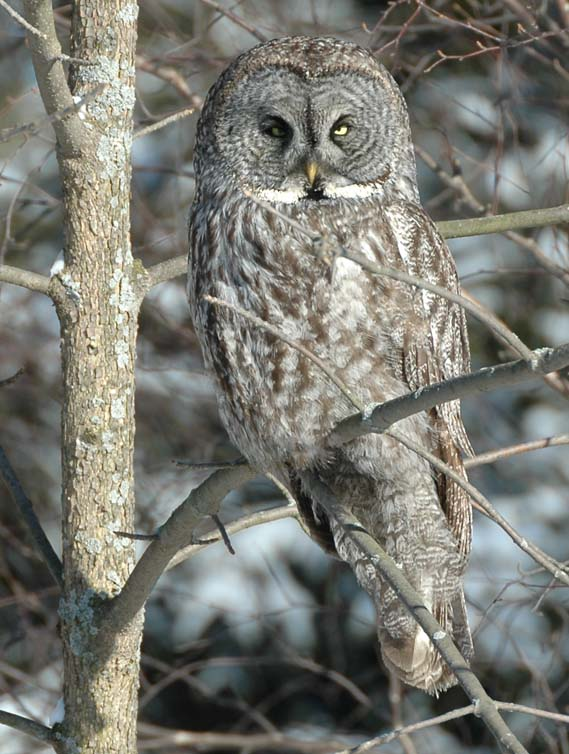
Great grey owl

Owls

- Common barn owl
- Western screech owl
- Great horned owl
- Mountain pygmy owl
- Northern spotted owl
- Barred owl
- Great grey owl
- Long-eared owl
- Short-eared owl
- Northern saw-whet owl

Nighthawks and swifts

- Common nighthawk
- Black swift
- Vaux's swift

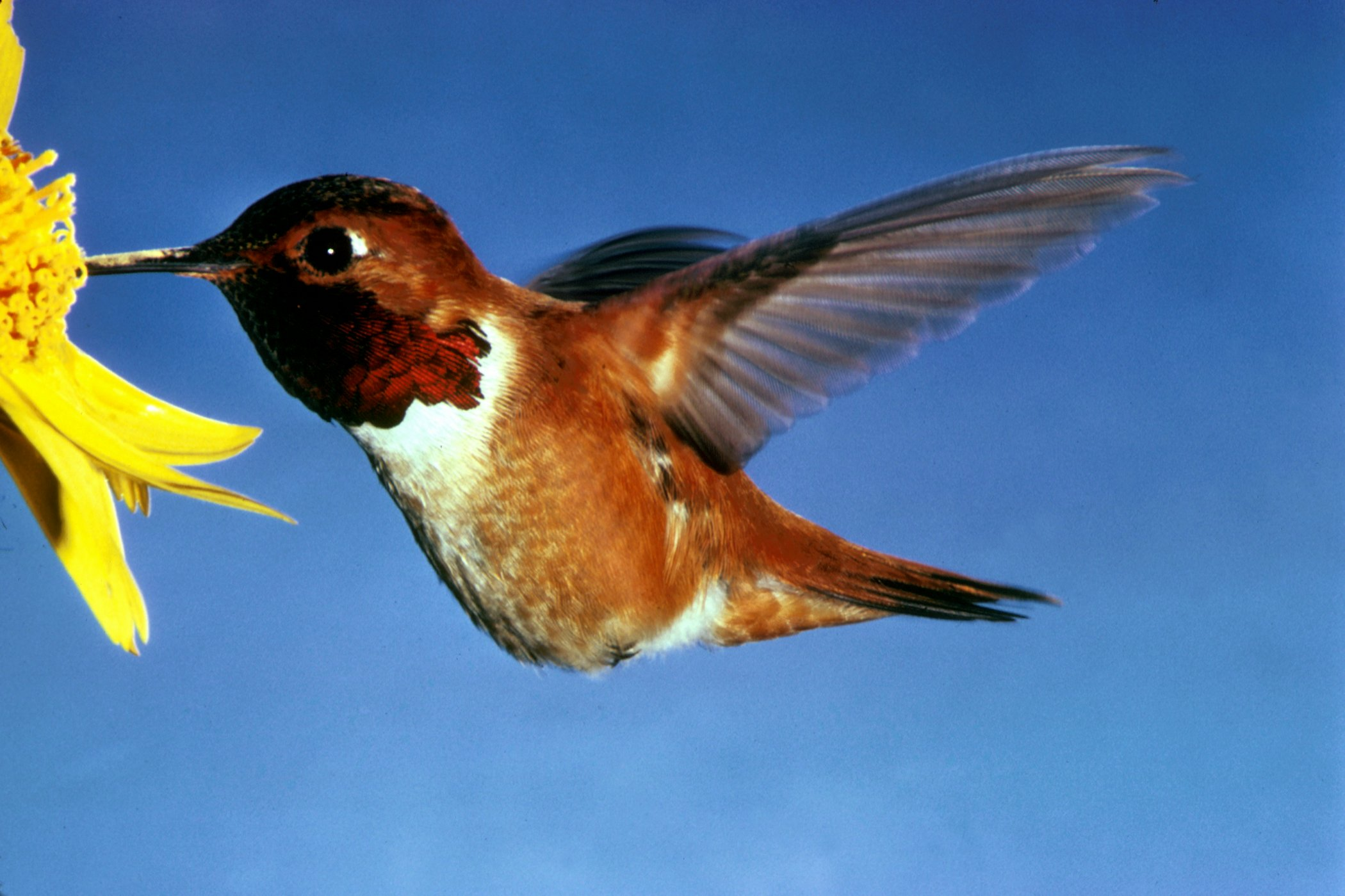
Rufous hummingbird

Hummingbirds

- Calliope hummingbird
- Rufous hummingbird

Kingfishers

- Belted kingfisher

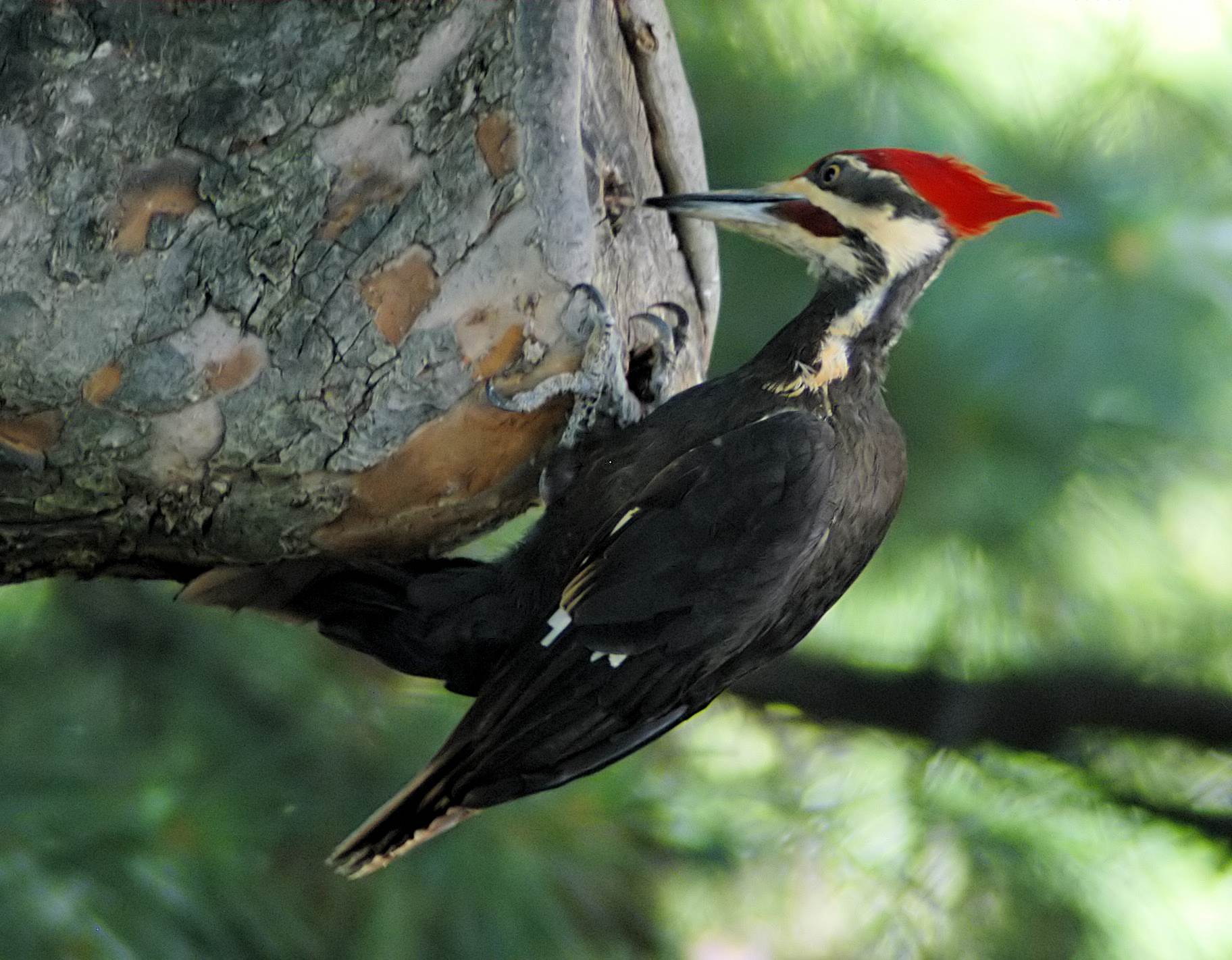
Pileated woodpecker

Woodpeckers

- Lewis' woodpecker
- Red-breasted sapsucker
- Downy woodpecker
- Hairy woodpecker
- Three-toed woodpecker
- Northern flicker
- Pileated woodpecker

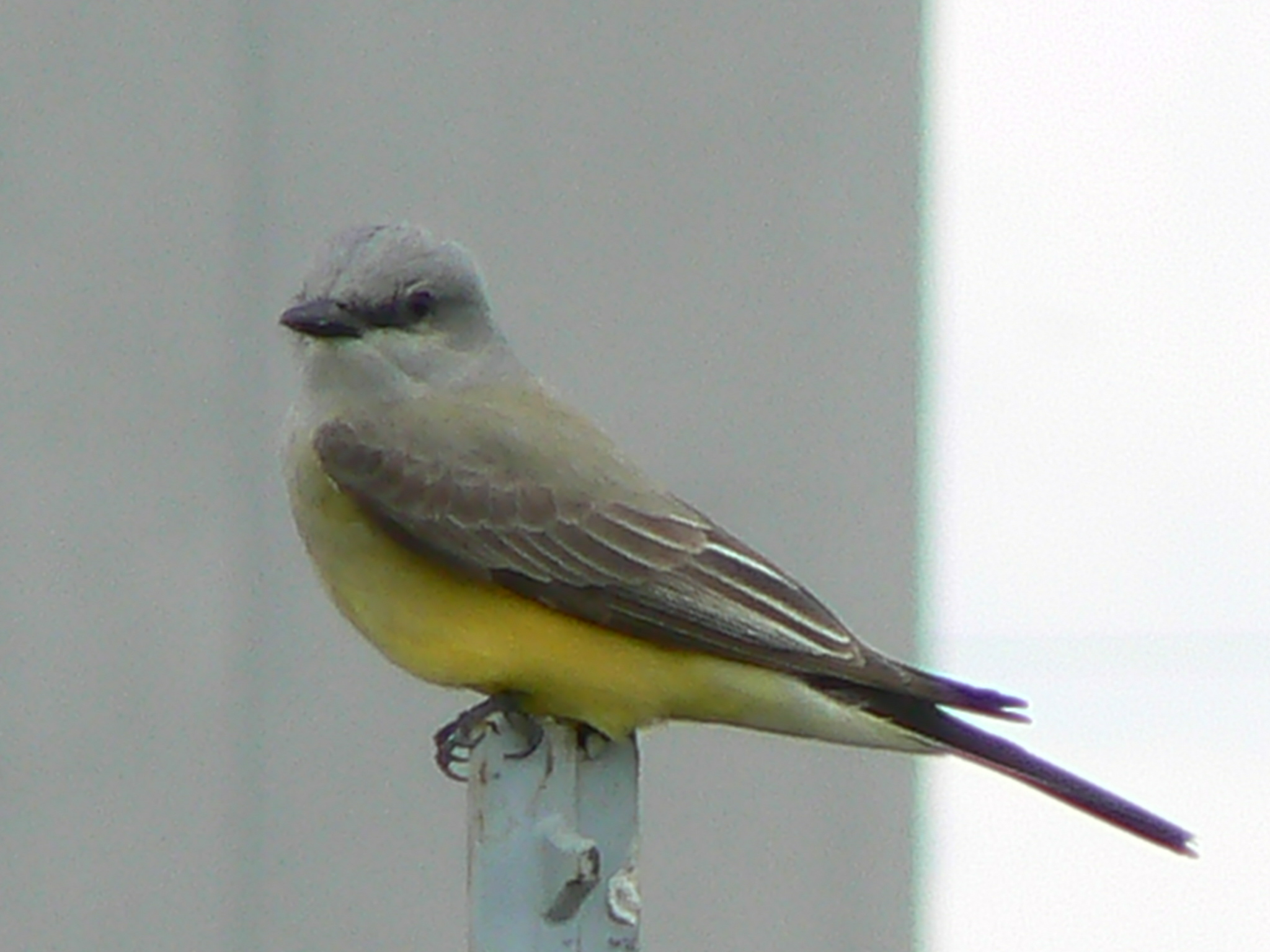
Western kingbird

Flycatchers

- Olive-sided flycatcher
- Western wood pewee
- Willow flycatcher
- Hammond's flycatcher
- Dusky flycatcher
- Say's phoebe
- Western kingbird
- Eastern kingbird

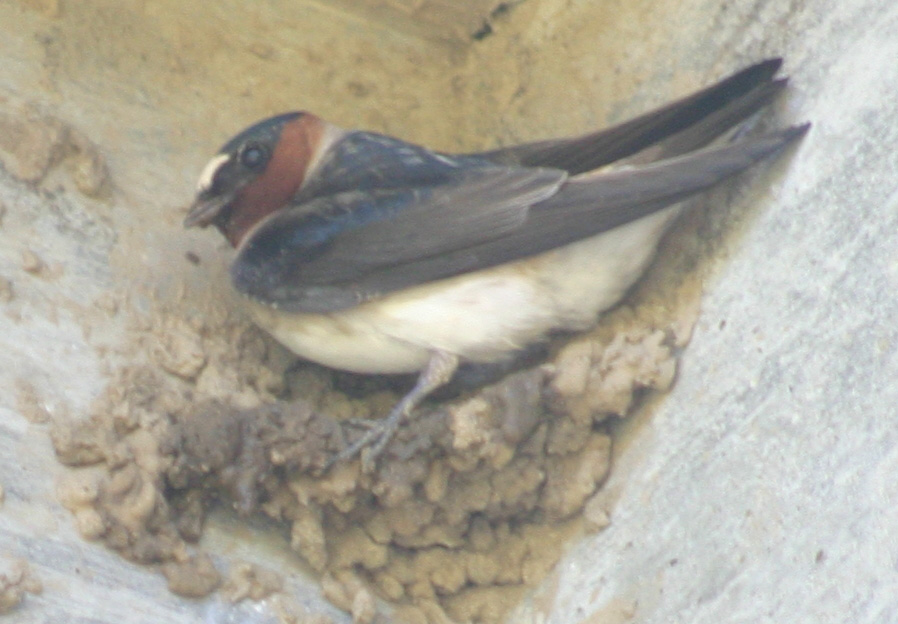
Cliff swallow

Larks

- Horned lark

Swallows

- Tree swallow
- Violet-green swallow
- Northern rough-winged swallow
- Cliff swallow
- Barn swallow

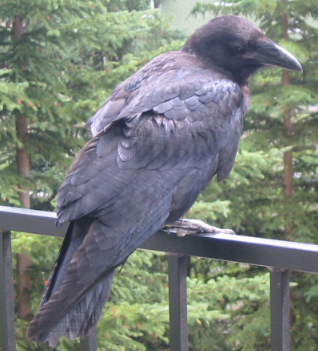
Common raven

Jays, crows, ravens

- Canada jay
- Steller's jay
- Clark's nutcracker
- Black-billed magpie
- American crow
- Common raven

Chickadees, nuthatches, creepers

- Black-capped chickadee
- Mountain chickadee
- Boreal chickadee
- Chestnut-backed chickadee
- Bushtit
- Red-breasted nuthatch
- White-breasted nuthatch
- Brown creeper

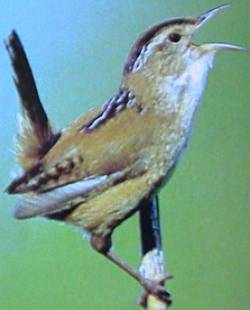
Marsh wren

Wrens

- Bewick's wren
- Marsh wren

Dippers

- American dipper

Kinglets

- Golden crowned kinglet
- Ruby-crowned kinglet

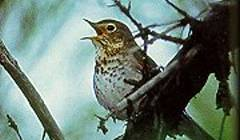
Swainson's thrush

Bluebirds, robins, thrushes

- Mountain bluebird
- Townsend's solitaire
- Veery
- Swainson's thrush
- Hermit thrush
- American robin
- Varied thrush

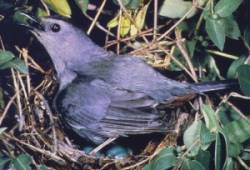
gray catbird

Catbirds

- Gray catbird

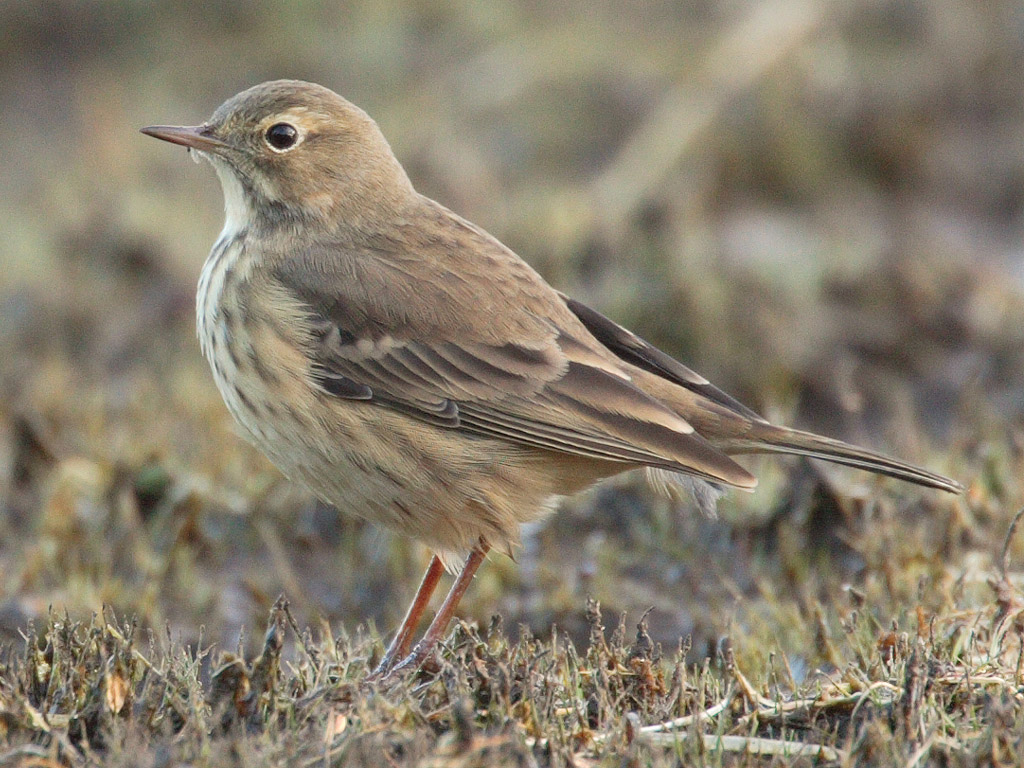
American pipit

Pipits

- American pipit

Waxwings

- Bohemian waxwing
- Cedar waxwing

Shrikes

- Northern shrike

Starlings

- European starling (introduced)

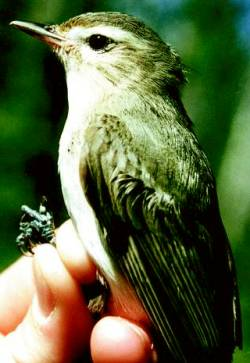
Warbling vireo

Vireos

- Solitary vireo
- Warbling vireo
- Red-eyed vireo

Warblers

- Orange-crowned warbler
- Nashville warbler
- Yellow warbler
- Yellow-rumped warbler
- Black-throated gray warbler
- Townsend's warbler
- Hermit warbler
- American redstart
- Northern waterthrush
- MacGillivray's warbler
- Common yellowthroat
- Wilson's warbler

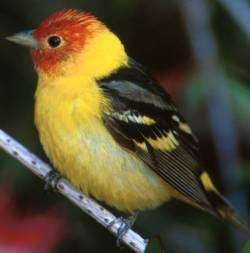
Western tanager

Tanagers

- Western tanager

Blackbirds, meadowlarks, orioles

- Red-winged blackbird
- Yellow-headed blackbird
- Brewer's blackbird
- Western meadowlark
- Brown-headed cowbird
- Northern oriole

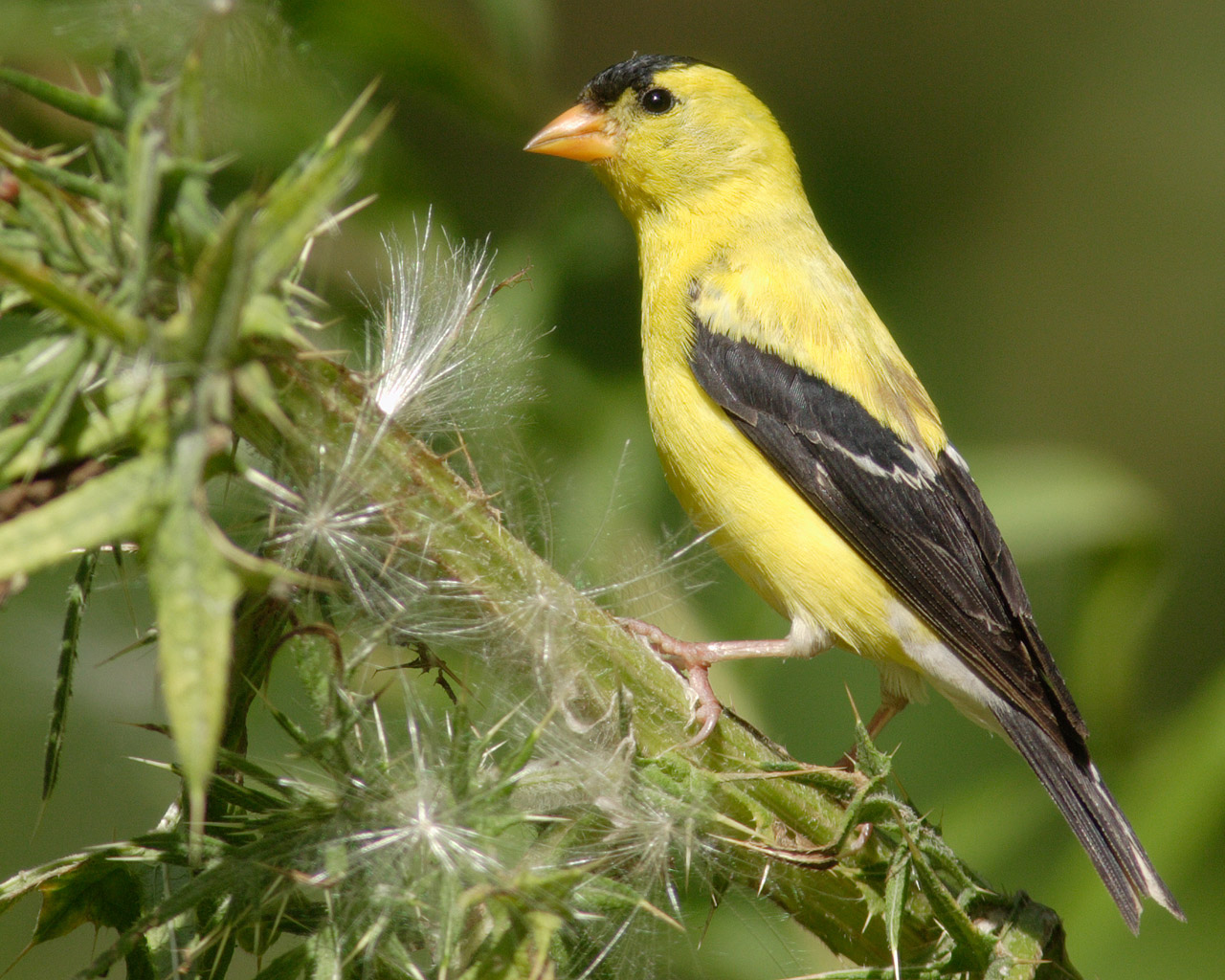
American goldfinch

Grosbeaks, buntings, sparrows

- Black-headed grosbeak
- Lazuli bunting
- Spotted towhee
- Chipping sparrow
- Savannah sparrow
- Fox sparrow
- Song sparrow
- Lincoln's sparrow
- Golden-crowned sparrow
- White-crowned sparrow
- White-throated sparrow
- Dark-eyed junco
- Rosy finch
- Pine grosbeak
- Purple finch
- House finch
- Red crossbill
- White-winged crossbill
- Common redpoll
- Pine siskin
- American goldfinch
- Evening grosbeak
- House sparrow (introduced)
