= Sumallo River =

River in British Columbia, Canada

Coordinates: 49°13′00″N 121°05′00″W

The Sumallo River is located in southern British Columbia, in the Cascade Mountains to the east of Hope. It begins on the east slopes of Mount Payne, south of the village of Sunshine Valley. It flows north until it reaches Sunshine Valley where it turns southeast and proceeds into Manning Park. It continues southeast within the park, running alongside Highway 3 before eventually meeting the Skagit River at the northern boundary of Skagit Valley Provincial Park, to the northeast of Marmot Mountain.

The name comes from the word Semall-á-ow given to Alexander Caulfield Anderson by his Nlaka'pamux guide on an 1846 journey through the North Cascades. This word is not from the Halkomelem language from local Sto:lo people, so it may be a Nlaka'pamuctsin (Thompson) word.

== See also ==
- List of rivers of British Columbia
