= Klesilkwa River =

Coordinates: 49°07′00″N 121°10′00″W

The Klesilkwa River is a tributary of the Skagit River, flowing east to join that river to the west of Shawatum Mountain after arising near Klesilkwa Mountain, on the east flank of Chilliwack Lake.
