= Skagit River =

River in Canada and the United States

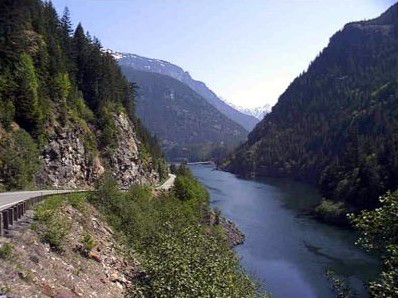
- Gorge Lake portion of the Skagit River in Washington

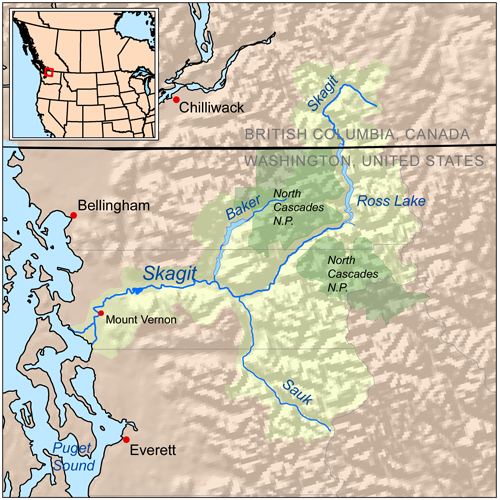
- Map of the Skagit River drainage basin

Location
- Country: Canada, United States
- Region: British Columbia, Washington
- Cities: Newhalem, Marblemount, Rockport, Concrete, Sedro-Woolley, Mount Vernon, Burlington

Physical characteristics
- Source: Allison Pass
  - location: E. C. Manning Provincial Park, British Columbia
  - coordinates: 49°07′23″N 120°52′39″W
  - elevation: 4,480 ft (1,370 m)
- Mouth: Skagit forks near Puget Sound
  - location: Skagit City, Washington
  - coordinates: 48°23′14″N 122°22′01″W
  - elevation: 10 ft (3.0 m)
- Length: 150 mi (240 km)
- Basin size: 2,656 sq mi (6,880 km^{2})
- Discharge
  - location: Mount Vernon, WA, river mile 1 (rkm 1.6)
  - average: 16,530 cu ft/s (468 m^{3}/s)
  - minimum: 3,050 cu ft/s (86 m^{3}/s)
  - maximum: 180,000 cu ft/s (5,100 m^{3}/s)

Basin features
- Tributaries
  - left: Cascade River, Sauk River
  - right: Baker River

National Wild and Scenic River
- Type: Scenic, Recreational
- Designated: November 10, 1978

The Skagit River (/ˈskædʒɪt/ SKAJ-it) is a river in southwestern British Columbia in Canada and northwestern Washington in the United States, approximately 150 mi (240 km) long. The river and its tributaries drain an area of 1.7 million acres (690,000 hectares) of the Cascade Range along the northern end of Puget Sound and flows into the sound.

The Skagit watershed is characterized by a temperate, mid-latitude, maritime climate. Temperatures range widely throughout the watershed. Recorded temperatures at Newhalem range from a low of −6 °F (−21 °C) to a high of 109 °F (43 °C), with greater extremes likely in the mountains. The highest temperatures are commonly recorded in July; the lowest are in January.

== Course ==
The Skagit River rises at Allison Pass in the Canadian Cascades of British Columbia. From there it flows northwest along the Crowsnest Highway, which follows the river into Manning Provincial Park. It turns abruptly south, where it receives Snass Creek from the right, then enters Skagit Valley Provincial Park at the point where it receives the Sumallo River from the right. It receives the Klesilkwa River from the right, and turns southeast to flow into Ross Lake, where it crosses the Canada–United States border and into Washington state.

Ross Lake is formed by Ross Dam and is approximately 24 miles (39 km) long, winding south through Ross Lake National Recreation Area. Here the river receives Beaver Creek from the right and Ruby Creek from the left. Spilling out of the dam the river enters Diablo Lake, formed by Diablo Dam, and receives Thunder and Colonial creeks from the left, before it enters the third and final reservoir, Gorge Lake, formed by Gorge Dam. All three dams are part of the Skagit River Hydroelectric Project.

Past Gorge Dam, the river is often dry, as its waters have been diverted to generate hydroelectricity. Water is returned to the river as it passes Newhalem, a company town for Seattle City Light. Copper and Bacon creeks, both flowing from North Cascades National Park, merge into the Skagit from the right as it meanders slowly through an agricultural valley, past Marblemount, where the Cascade River joins from the left, and Rockport, where it receives its major tributary, the Sauk River, from the left.

After receiving the Sauk River, the Skagit turns west, flowing past Concrete and receiving the Baker River, its second-largest tributary, from the right. The river continues to flow west, past Sedro-Woolley, Burlington and then Mount Vernon. It is crossed by Interstate 5, a major national highway, between Burlington and Mount Vernon; the four-lane bridge over the Skagit River collapsed in May 2013 and was reopened a month later.

At the former site of Skagit City, the Skagit River diverges into two forks, a north and south fork. Fir Island lies between the forks in the 90,000-acre (36,000 ha) floodplain. These two forks both empty into Skagit Bay, a branch of Puget Sound.

== Natural history ==
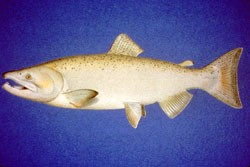
Chinook salmon

The Skagit provides spawning habitat for salmon. It is the only large river system in Washington that contains healthy populations of all five native salmon species – chinook, coho, chum, pink, and sockeye – and two species of trout: steelhead and coastal cutthroat.

The river supports one of the largest wintering bald eagle populations in the contiguous United States. The eagles feed on Chum and Coho salmon that have returned to spawn in the Skagit and its tributaries. The eagles arrive in late October or early November and stay into February. The highest number of eagles is usually seen in January. These eagles come from inland Canada and as far away as Alaska and Montana. When the salmon run is plentiful, as many as 600 to 800 eagles are attracted to the river.

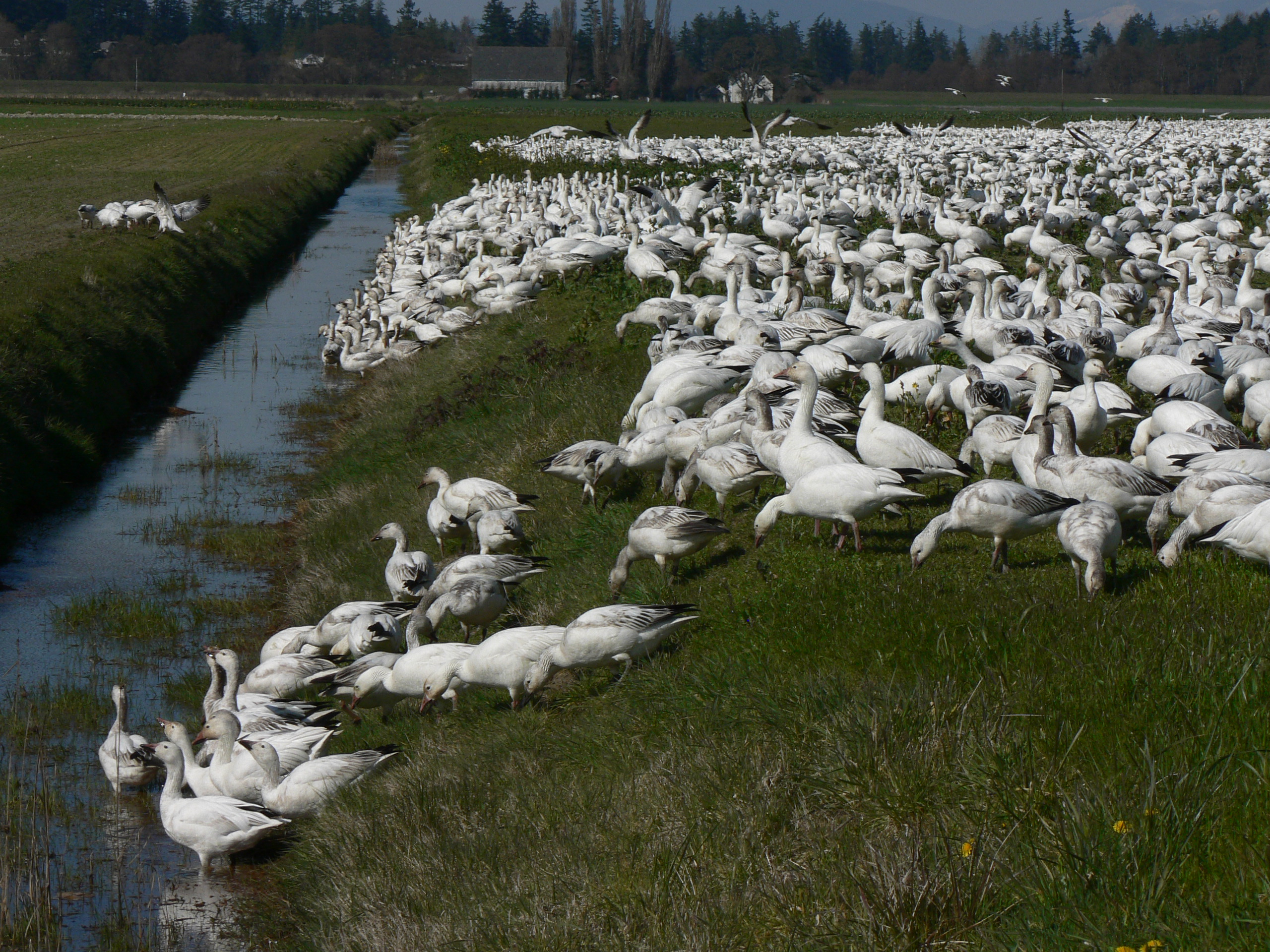
The Skagit River Delta is an important winter habitat for snow geese (pictured) and trumpeter swans

Thousands of snow geese winter in the Skagit River estuary. These geese feed on intertidal marsh plants such as bulrush and they are drawn to nearby farmlands where they find leftover potatoes in the fields. Trumpeter swans are drawn to the estuary habitat as well. There can be several hundred swans in the Skagit valley from October to February.

Historically, the Skagit tidal estuary had beaver dams in the myrtle zone. These were overtopped at high tide, but at low tide their ponds nurtured juvenile salmon.

The Skagit River basin provides habitat for a diverse set of animals. For more information about these animals, see List of Wildlife of the Skagit River Basin.

== Geology ==
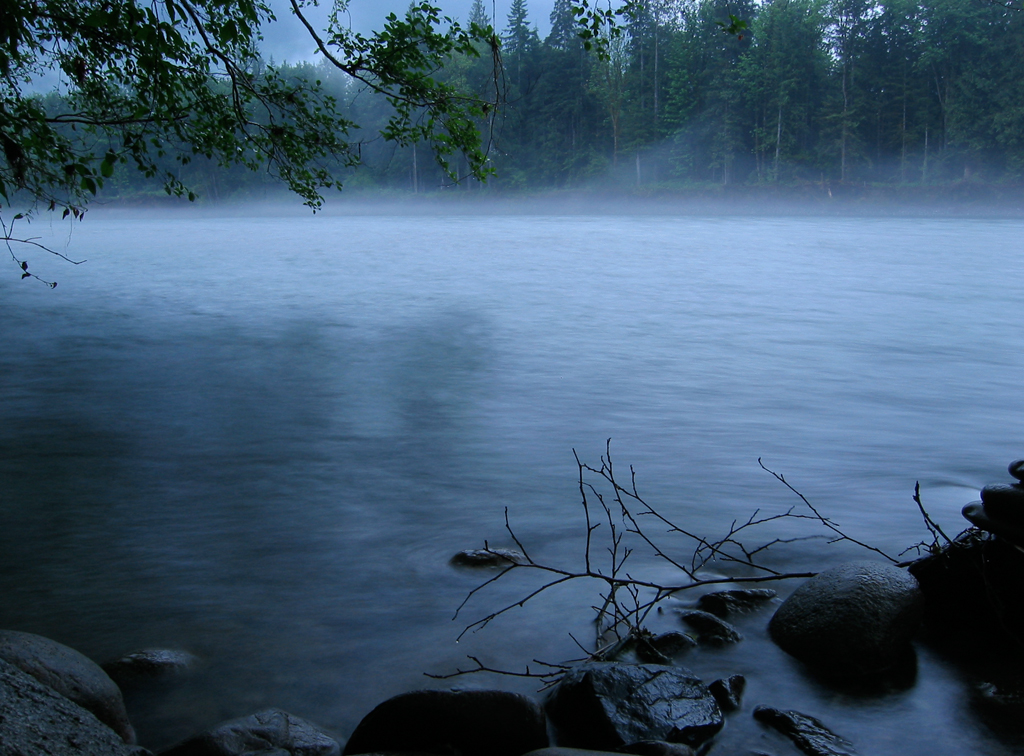
The Skagit River near Marblemount, Washington

The Skagit River was highly influenced by the repeated advance and retreat of the Puget Lobe of the Cordilleran Ice Sheet. Ice and gravel moraines repeatedly blocked the Skagit, causing it to pool into lakes and forcing it to drain south into the future North Fork Stillaguamish River. After the ice retreated the Skagit breached the moraine dam near Concrete, Washington, finding its present course. The Sauk River and Suiattle River continued to drain into the future North Fork Stillaguamish River until eruptions of Glacier Peak choked the rivers with debris, causing the formation of an alluvial fan near present-day Darrington, Washington. The debris forced the two rivers north to join the Skagit.

Above Newhalem, Washington, the Skagit flows through a deep gorge, contrasting strongly with the glacial valley below Newhalem. One of the several theories about this anomaly is that the upper Skagit once drained northward into Canada and the growth and retreat of successive Cordilleran ice flows brought about the reversal. Each advance blocked the river, forcing it to find new routes to the south, in the process carving deep gorges. Eventually, the Skagit gorge was so deep that even after the Cordilleran ice retreated for good, the river continued flowing south instead of north into Canada.

The Skagit watershed is made up of high peaks and low valleys. The highest points in the basin are two volcanoes: Mount Baker, elevation 10,781 feet (3,286 m), and Glacier Peak, elevation 10,541 feet (3,213 m). Most of the basin lies above 2,000 feet (610 m). The river completes its course at sea level where it meets the Puget Sound.

== History ==
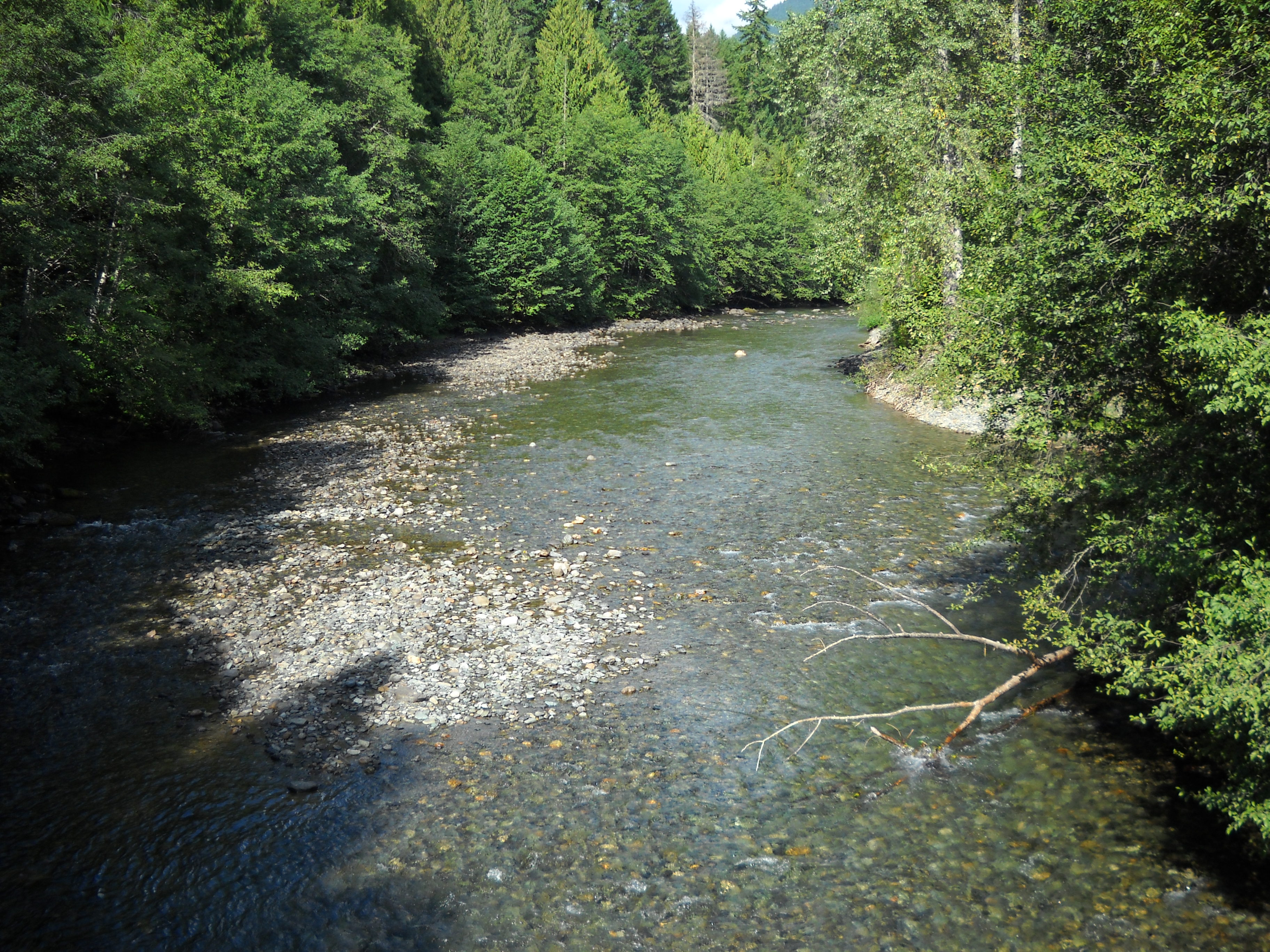
Looking upstream from 26 Mile Bridge in British Columbia, Canada

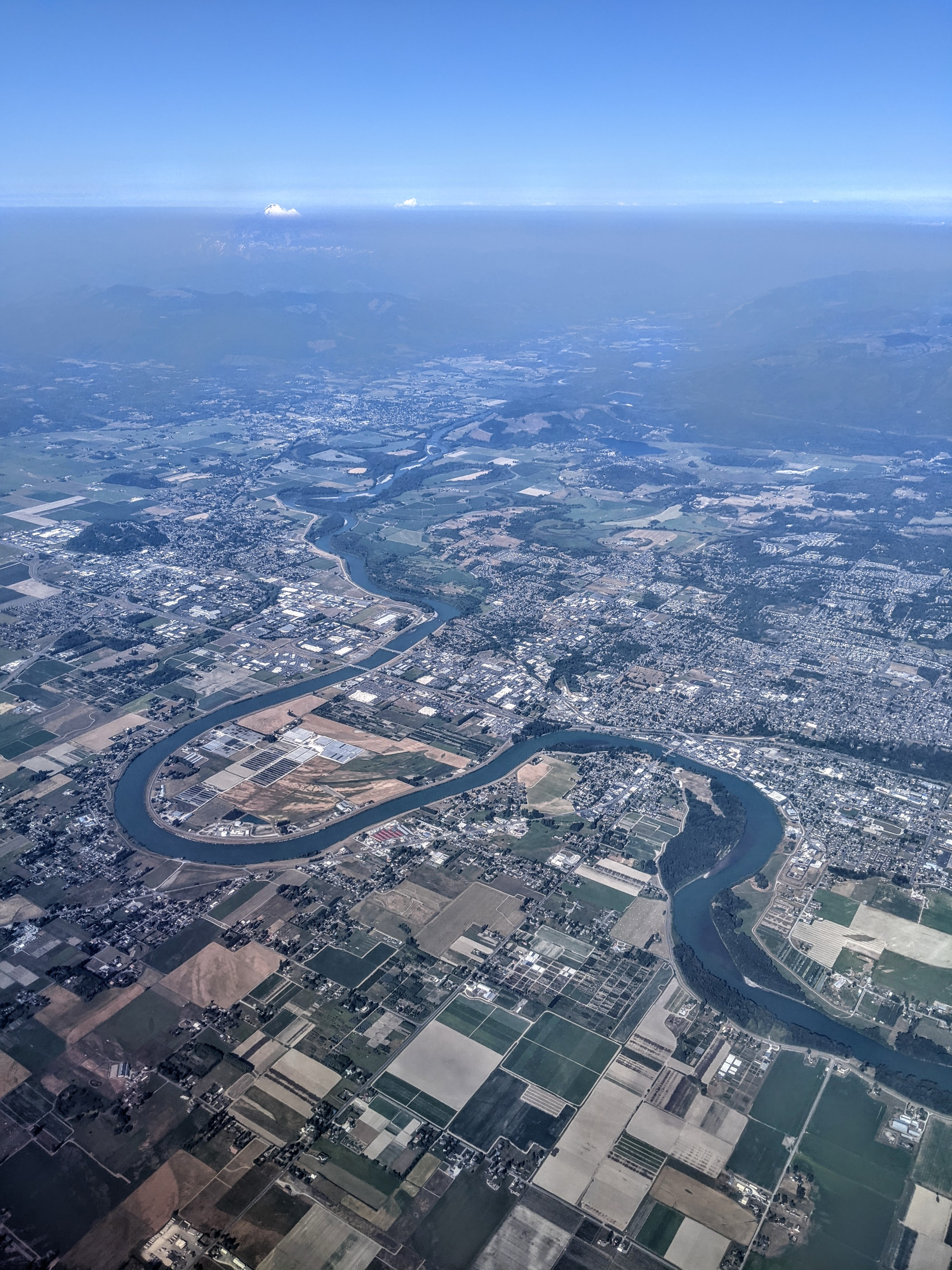
Aerial view of the Skagit River at Burlington and Mount Vernon

The river takes its name from the Skagit tribe, a name used by Europeans and Americans for two distinct Native American peoples, the Upper Skagit and Lower Skagit. Native people have lived along the Skagit for thousands of years. Archaeological evidence indicates that ancestors of the Upper Skagit tribe lived in the area now called Ross Lake National Recreation Area at least 8,000 years ago. They quarried chert from Hozomeen Mountain to make blades, which were used across a wide trading area.

Both tribes traditionally spoke dialects of the Lushootseed language, a branch of the Salishan family. The Upper Skagit tribe occupied the land along the Skagit from what is now Newhalem to the mouth of the river at Puget Sound. The Lower Skagit tribe lived on northern Whidbey Island and have come to be known also as the Whidbey Island Skagit. Archaeological evidence reveals that these peoples collected their food from the natural resources, through fishing, hunting, and gathering.

The upper Skagit area was first described in writing in 1859 by Henry Custer, the American topographer for the US Boundary Commission. With two other American government men and ten locals from the Nooksack and Chilliwack bands, he canoed and portaged from the Canada–United States border down to Ruby Creek, a tributary of the upper Skagit River. The party found no native people inhabiting the Upper Skagit area at the time.

Custer later talked about the area with an elder Samona chief named Chinsoloc who had lived there at one time; he drew a detailed map from memory, which the topographer found to be accurate. (Note: It is unclear what tribe this refers to; there is no local tribe called Samona. The Skeetchestn Indian Band, of the Secwepemc (Shuswap) Nation, were located in the area of present-day Savona, British Columbia. Since the 1860s, they have had a reserve there.) Custer documented this encounter and the accuracy of the chief's map in his Report of Henry Custer, Assistant of Reconnaissances, Made in 1859 over the routes in the Cascades Mountains in the vicinity of the 49th parallel, now in the collection of the National Park Service.

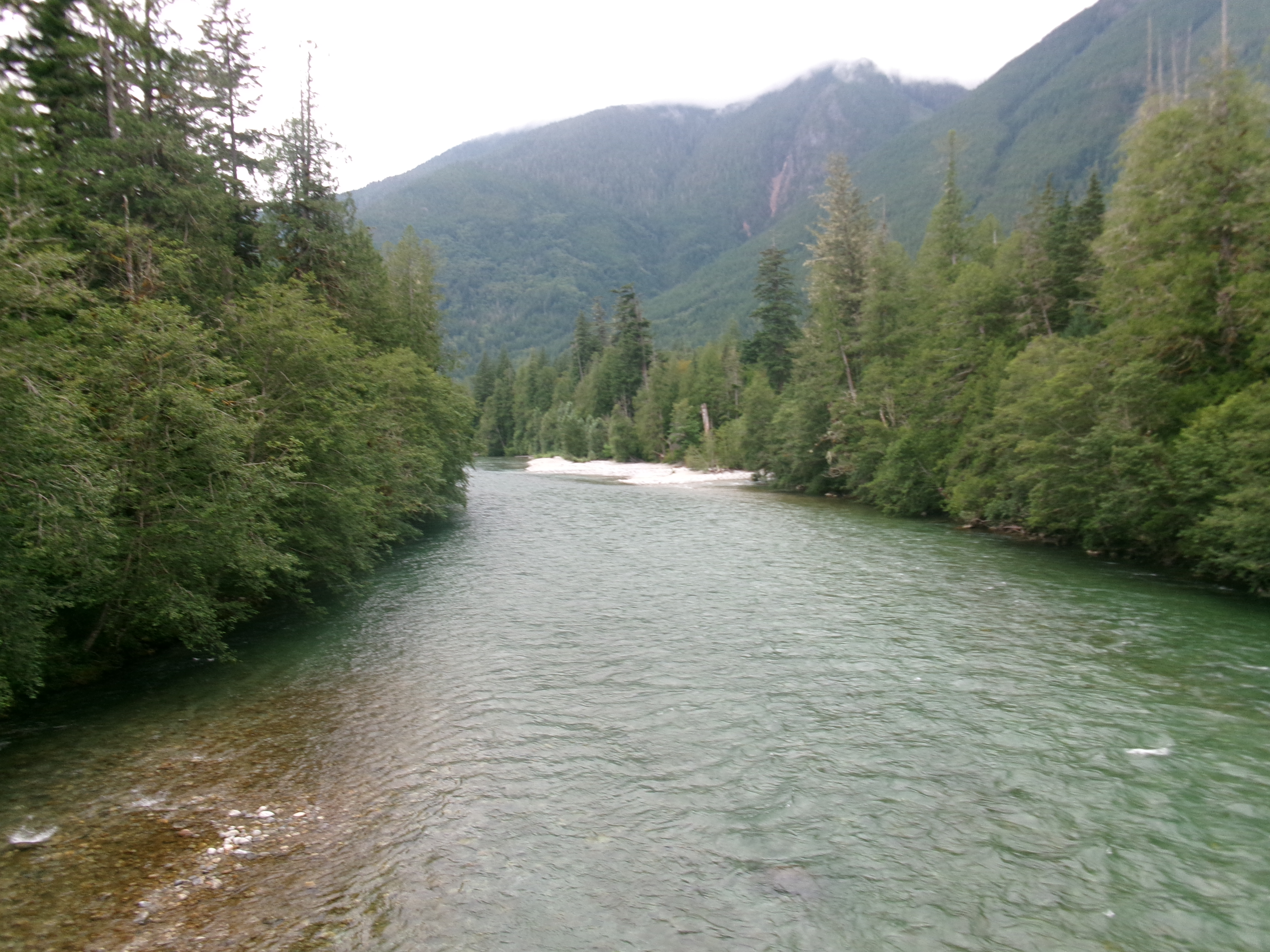
The Skagit River flowing through North Cascades National Park near Newhalem, Washington

Settlement along the river by European Americans in the late 1800s was inhibited by two ancient logjams that blocked navigation upriver. The settlers first established a village at the tip of the delta which they called Skagit City. The massive logjam was found about 10 miles (16 km) upstream from the mouth of the river. Attempts to remove it began in 1874 by a team of loggers, who salvaged the logs. After three years of work, a 5-acre (20,000 m^{2}) section of the jam broke free and scattered downriver. Soon thereafter the river became navigable. Mount Vernon was founded at the approximate site of this logjam.

In November 1897, the Skagit River flooded severely; in the aftermath as the floodwaters receded, two new logjams formed and blocked navigation. The largest was near the mouth, and filled the river from bank to bank for about 800 yards (730 m). Using a recently built logjam removal boat named Skagit, teams finally cleared this jam in about a month. The years 1909, 1917, and 1921 are the other annual peak discharges of record for the gauging station at Concrete which is at the confluence of the Baker and Skagit Rivers.

November 2017 brought significant flooding to the lower river at Mt. Vernon and Lyman. In December 2025, two atmospheric river rainfall events caused record flooding on the lower Skagit, with the river cresting at just under 38' in Mt. Vernon on December 12. Federal disaster relief aid was approved for the state following large scale flooding on the Skagit River and neighboring Puget Sound watersheds.

== Wild and scenic designation ==
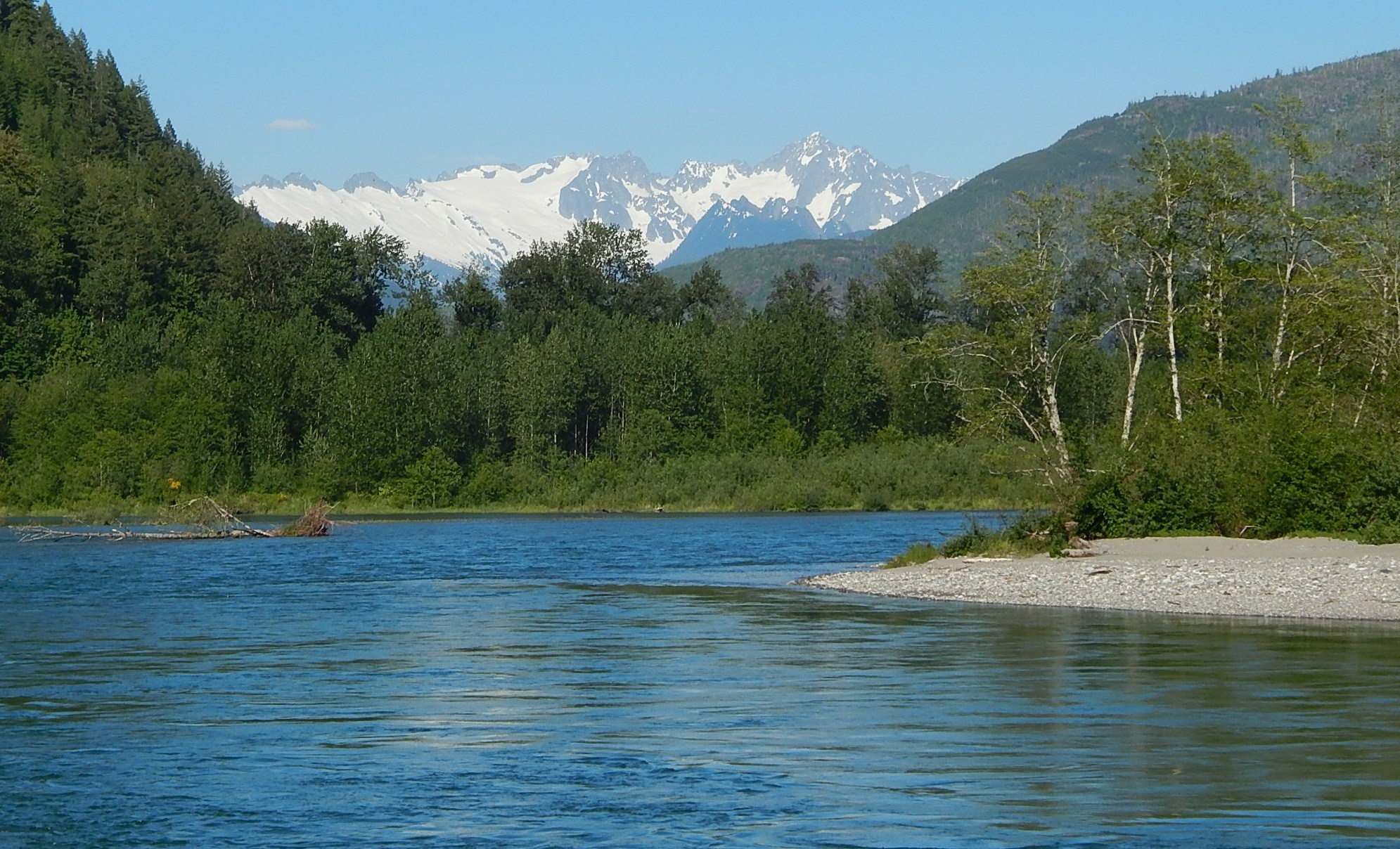
Eldorado Peak seen with Skagit River

In 1978, the United States Congress established the Skagit Wild and Scenic River System. The system includes 158.5 miles (255.1 km) of the Skagit and its tributaries — the Sauk, Suiattle, and Cascade rivers. This Wild and Scenic designation is meant to protect and enhance the values that caused it to be listed:

- Free-flowing characteristics and water quality of each of the four rivers;
- Outstandingly remarkable wildlife, fish, and scenic qualities.

The Skagit Wild and Scenic River System flows through both public and private lands. Fifty percent of the system is in private ownership, 44 percent is National Forest System land, and 6 percent is owned by the state and other agencies. The Skagit Wild and Scenic River is managed by the U.S. Forest Service as part of the Mt. Baker-Snoqualmie National Forest.

== Economy ==
The Skagit River Hydroelectric Project is a group of three major dams, constructed in the 1920s and 1930s, which are a primary source of hydroelectric power for Seattle and other area communities. The Skagit River Railway was constructed by the city of Seattle to transport workers and construction materials for the dams. The river today is a popular destination for whitewater rafting and fly fishing.

== Tributaries ==
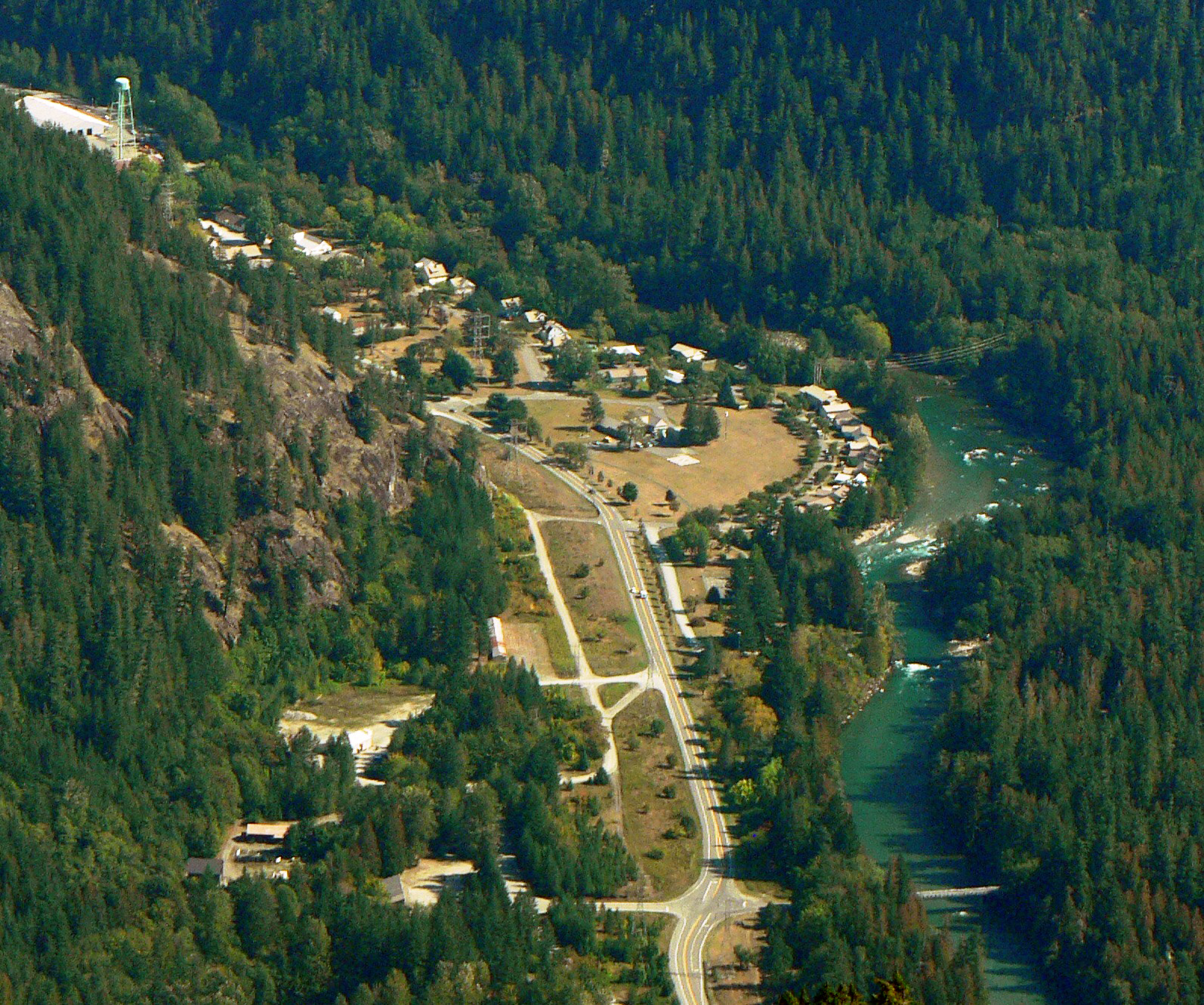
At Newhalem, Washington State Route 20 closely follows the Skagit River.

Tributaries in Canada

- Skaist River
- Sumallo River
- Klesilkwa River

Tributaries in the US

- Cascade River
- Sauk River
- Baker River

== Populated places on the Skagit River ==
- Mount Vernon
- Burlington
- Sedro-Woolley
- Lyman
- Hamilton
- Concrete
- Rockport
- Newhalem

== See also ==
- List of rivers of British Columbia
- List of Washington rivers
- List of National Wild and Scenic Rivers
