= Radical Women =

Socialist and feminist activists' organization

- Formation: 1967
- Founder: Clara Fraser, Gloria Martin, Melba Windoffer
- Founded at: Seattle, Washington, U.S.
- Headquarters: Seattle, Washington, U.S.
- Website: radicalwomen.org

Radical Women (RW) is an American socialist feminist grassroots activist organization affiliated with the Freedom Socialist Party. It has branches in Seattle, Washington, and Melbourne, Australia.

== History ==
Radical Women emerged in Seattle from a "Free University" class on Women and Society conducted by Gloria Martin, a lifelong communist and civil rights champion. As a result of the class, Martin teamed up with Clara Fraser and Melba Windoffer (initiators of the Freedom Socialist Party) and Susan Stern (a prominent figure in the local Students for a Democratic Society) to launch Radical Women in 1967.

In Socialist Feminism: The First Decade, 1966-76 Martin writes that the new group was formed to "demonstrate that women could act politically, learn and teach theory, administer an organization, develop indigenous leadership, and focus movement and community attention on the sorely neglected matter of women's rights—and that women could do this on their own."

Radical Women participated heavily in the anti-Vietnam War mobilization, and has opposed subsequent military interventions initiated by Western countries.

Members worked with African-American women from anti-poverty programs to initiate the abortion rights movement in Washington State with a historic march on the capitol in 1969.

In the early 1970s, RW helped organize a strike and a union of low-paid employees (mostly female) at the University of Washington.

After working closely with the Freedom Socialist Party (FSP), Radical Women and the party formally affiliated in 1973 on the basis of a shared socialist feminist program. Some of its early members, such as Lynda Schraufnagel, volunteered for the FSP's newspaper, The Freedom Socialist, and also wrote for it.

Many Radical Women members worked and organized in the nontraditional trades. At Seattle's public power company, Seattle City Light, Clara Fraser was recruited to craft and implement the country's first plan to train women as utility electricians. Three other members of Radical Women, Megan Cornish, Heidi Durham, and Teri Bach, participated in the program and went on to become some of the first women electricians in the country. Just weeks before the program began, however, Fraser participated in a walkout against new rules issued by City Light superintendent Gordon Vickery, which soured her relations with management. After their training, Cornish, Durham, and Bach were laid off in 1975 in an act seen largely as retaliatory against themselves and Fraser. The three women filed a lawsuit alleging discrimination on the basis of sex, and after a year a court ruled in their favor and ordered their reinstatement. Fraser was also laid off in 1975, and she filed her own separate lawsuit alleging discrimination on the basis of sex and political ideology. After a seven-year legal battle and a massive public relations campaign, Fraser won her reinstatement at City Light.

In 1991, two members of Radical Women, Heidi Durham and Yolanda Alaniz, ran for Seattle City Council as members of the FSP. The two campaigned together on demands for guaranteed income for families living in poverty, domestic partnership rights for same-sex couples, and community control of the police. Alaniz advanced to the general election and finished with 21% of the vote.

== Purpose and ideology ==
The Radical Women Manifesto: Socialist Feminist Theory, Program and Organizational Structure defines Radical Women's purpose and ideology as follows:

Radical Women is dedicated to exposing, resisting, and eliminating the inequities of women's existence. To accomplish this task of insuring survival for an entire sex, we must simultaneously address ourselves to the social and material source of sexism: the capitalist form of production and distribution of products, characterized by intrinsic class, race, sex, and caste oppression. When we work for the revolutionary transformation of capitalism into a socialist society, we work for a world in which all people may enjoy the right of full humanity and freedom from poverty, war, racism, sexism, homophobia, anti-Semitism, and repression.

Radical Women takes a multi-racial, multi-issue, working class and anti-capitalist approach to women's liberation. It advocates for free abortion on demand, an end to forced sterilization of women of color, and for affordable, quality, 24-hour childcare. Early efforts include the Action Childcare Coalition, the Feminist Coordinating Council (an umbrella organization made up of the whole spectrum of women's groups in Seattle), and the Coalition for Protective Legislation (a labor and feminist effort to extend female-designated workplace safeguards to men after passage of the Washington State Equal Rights Amendment).

Radical Women has played a leading role in lesbian/gay/bisexual/transgender liberation struggles. Members have helped build militant lesbian/gay rights organizations and have been involved in many coalitions devoted to preventing forced AIDS testing, opposing ballot-box attacks on gay rights, lobbying for state gay rights bills, and more. In the 1980s Radical Women leader Merle Woo, a college lecturer, writer and Asian American lesbian spokesperson, won a case against the University of California at Berkeley, which had fired her, charging discrimination on race, sex, sexuality, and political ideology.

== See also ==
- Freedom Socialist Party
- Clara Fraser
- Heidi Durham
- Megan Cornish
- History of feminism
- Marxist feminism
- Socialist feminism
