= Cedar Falls, Washington =

Unincorporated community in Washington, United States

Cedar Falls Moncton
- Unincorporated community
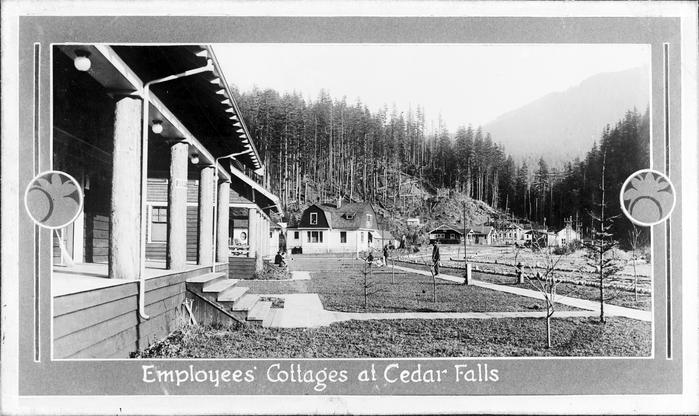
- Seattle City Light worker housing at Cedar Falls, 1914

- Location within the state of Washington
- Coordinates: 47°25′31″N 121°46′36″W
- Country: United States
- State: Washington
- County: King
- Elevation: 942 ft (287 m)
- Time zone: UTC-8 (Pacific (PST))
  - Summer (DST): UTC-7 (PDT)
- ZIP codes: 98022
- GNIS feature ID: 1517561

Cedar Falls is an unincorporated community in King County, Washington.

== History ==
Located on the Rattlesnake Prairie and the Cedar River watershed, Cedar Falls began under the name, Moncton, in 1906 under expansion of the transcontinental line of the Chicago, Milwaukee and St. Paul Railroad (CMStP&P) through Snoqualmie Pass. The community became a construction camp for the Seattle Municipal Light and Power Plant and as a joint-company town of Seattle City Light, the Seattle Water Department, and the CMStP&P. Each company provided separate housing and amenities for its employees and their families. Due to its location to Cedar Lake, the town became known as Cedar Falls and by 1909 was host to a grocery, hotel, and schoolhouse.

Seattle City Light began operations in the community to provide power to Seattle with the build of a dam outside the town in 1912 on the Cedar River. The power company received warnings about the porous glacial geology in the area but continued the construction. After the water retention structure was completed in early 1915, immediate flooding due to seepage began to occur. Almost the entirety of the population left their homes within months due to the rising water levels. Officials denied the dam was the cause of the flooding but after several months, Cedar Falls was condemned and compensation was provided to residents.
