= Seattle Municipal Light and Power Plant =

- U.S. National Register of Historic Places
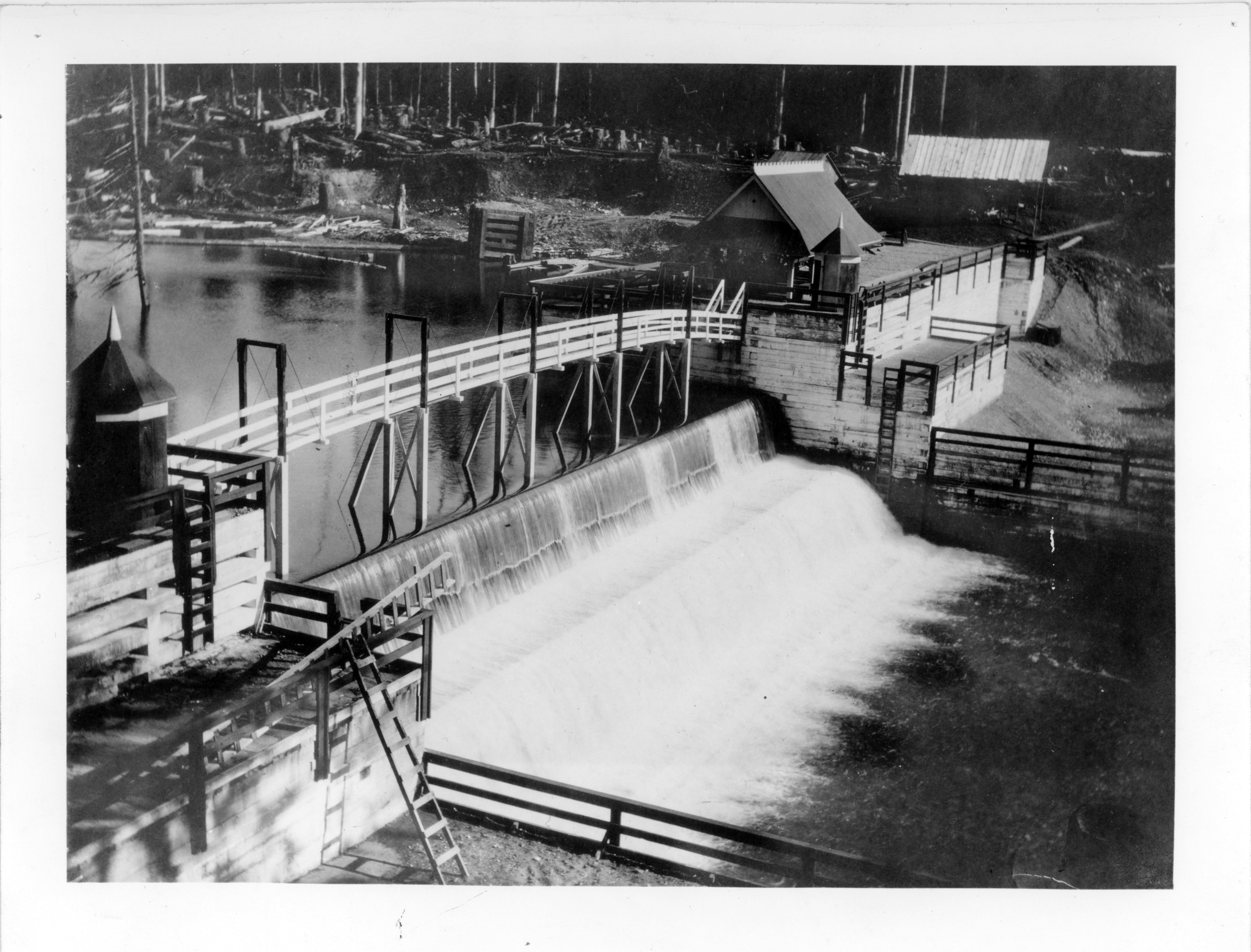
- Cedar Falls crib dam, 1903

- Location within Washington (state) Location within the United States
- Location: 20030 Cedar Falls Rd. SE, North Bend, Washington
- Coordinates: 47.419298°N 121.781868°W
- Area: 88 acres (36 ha)
- Built: 1904
- Built by: City of Seattle Engineering Dept.
- Architectural style: industrial vernacular
- NRHP reference No.: 97001077
- Added to NRHP: September 11, 1997

Seattle Municipal Light and Power Plant, also known as Cedar Falls Historic District, is a public hydroelectric plant near North Bend, Washington operated by Seattle City Light. The plant on the Cedar River was the first publicly-owned electrical generating plant for Seattle and one of the earliest in the country for a municipality of its size. It was listed on the National Register of Historic Places in 1997.

The population of Seattle grew rapidly from 3500 in 1880 to 237,000 in 1910, and the city needed to provide power to its population. Electricity was first used for street lights, and then for electric railroads. Ultimately, private customers were provided electricity for lighting and appliances. The Seattle Municipal Light and Power Plant's initial capacity of 3500 kilowatts was increased to 13,500 kilowatts by 1910, and further improvements brought capacity to 40,000 kilowatts. Residents of the city paid one of the country's lowest electrical rates per kilowatt hour, more than half the rate charged by the private firm Seattle Electric Company (renamed Puget Sound Power and Light).

== Description ==
The district is within the Cedar River Watershed which provides two-thirds of Seattle's water. A 37-mile transmission line connects the power station to Seattle. The primary components of the historic district are the masonry dam build in 1914, the hydro-generating station added in the 1920s, and the company town. More recent additions, such as administrative buildings for Seattle Water, are within the district boundaries but do not contribute to its historic status.

The first component of the hydroelectric works was a timber crib dam in 1902. The crib dam was 250 feet (76 m) long with a central spillway. In the 1980s, the crib dam was used as a coffer during a major project to improve the masonry dam. It took four years to build the masonry dam which had a height of 215 feet (66 m) and width of nearly 1,000 feet (300 m). The crib dam was breached after a new overflow dike was built downstream.

City engineer Reginald H. Thomson added a sawmill at the lake mouth to provide milled lumber for the dam and other components, cutting about 2,000,000 board feet of lumber. When the natural level of Cedar Lake was raised 18 feet in 1903, it created a reservoir, and a secondary reservoir, Masonry Pool, was formed when the masonry dam was constructed in 1914. Camp One was relocated in 1914 due to rising water in the Masonry Pool. There are no structures remaining at either of the Camp One sites. Cedar Lake was later renamed Chester Morse Lake in honor of a longtime Seattle Water Department superintendent.

The power plant site was cleared in 1902. The original plant was a timber-framed powerhouse with seven bays. Behind it was the transformer house, built of concrete and stone. The transformer house was equipped with nine step-up transformers. The concrete and stone switch house was built behind the transformer house. Northwest of the powerhouse was a wood-framed workshop. An oil house on the hill above the plant provided oil to the transformers via gravity feed.

A second penstock pipeline, two larger generators, two inflow turbines, and a second transmission line to Seattle were added by 1908. The powerhouse was enlarged to 50 by 200 feet (15 m × 61 m) to house the new equipment, and a second switch house was built.

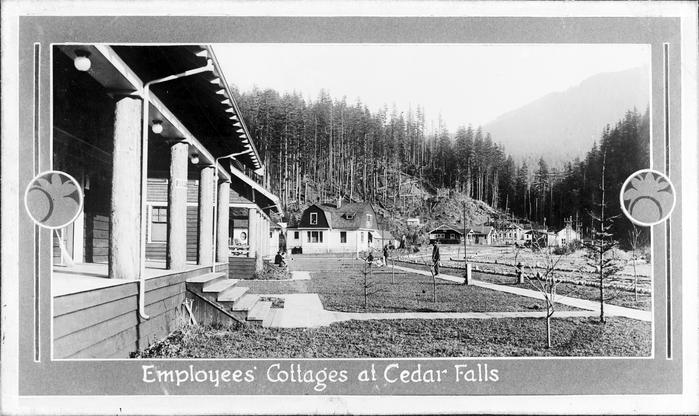
Employee cottages

The early construction camp in 1908 included a kitchen, mess hall, bunkhouse, cottages, a foreman's house, and outbuildings. Camp Two was established in 1911, housing around two hundred workers at the height of construction. It remained in service, housing employees and loggers, into the 1930s, although a serious forest fire in 1922 burned many of its structures. Two bungalow-style dormitories and a boarding house replaced the bunkhouse, kitchen, and mess hall in 1912. The streets of the City Light company town were lit by five-globe cluster street lights. In the 1910s, a gymnasium with a pool was built near the community gardens.

Automation reduced the number of on-site employees needed. Houses and outbuildings were removed throughout the 1960s as the number of on-site employees decreased. The 1913 log shelter for fire patrols and timber cruisers was relocated in 1963 to serve as an interpretive display. In 1996, only three residences and two large garage structures remained. The Cedar River Watershed Education Center had a groundbreaking ceremony in March 2000. The power plant is owned and operated by the City of Seattle. The Seattle Water Department owns and operates the townsite.

== Contributing resources ==
Hydroelectric plant sources that contribute to the historic registration are:

- Masonry dam built in 1912-1914
- Controlling gate house built in 1914
- Power tunnel built in 1912-1914
- Penstock valve house, also known as the lower gate house, built in 1914
- Open spandrel concrete arch bridge built in 1914
- Penstocks and supports built in 1920s with material replaced in 1950s
- Early penstock piers built in 1904-1908
- Powerhouse foundations built in 1904
- Concrete powerhouse built in 1921-1928
- Concrete transformer house built in 1904
- Stone switch house built in 1908
- City Light building built in 1932
- Transformer yard and switch yard foundations built c.1920
- Three early penstocks built in 1908

Townsite sources that contribute to the historic registration are:

- Allen Thompson House built in 1929
- Heavy timber garage built c.1920
- Warehouse and stable built c.1910
- City cabin built in 1913
- Street light standards installed c.1930
- Tennis court added in the late 1910s
- Circulation pattern from 1904 to 1932
- Howe truss bridge remnant from c.1915
- Fred Harman House built in 1917
- Charles Thompson House built in 1922
- Bridge remnant at the power plant from c.1940

== History ==
In 1902, city engineer Thomson proposed a hydroelectric plant below Cedar Falls that could eventually provide 25,000 horsepower, providing municipal power to Seattle. Seattle voters approved a bond measure of $590,000 for the proposal. James Delmage Ross developed blueprints for the infrastructure and submitted them to Thomson. In 1903, Ross was appointed assistant city engineer and chief electrical engineer for Seattle, developing both the Seattle Municipal Light and Power Plant and the Skagit River Hydroelectric Project.

The first timber dam on the Cedar River raised the river's level by 18 feet (5.5 m). The water was directed by the dam into an 49 inches (1,200 mm) diameter pipeline that was 15,407 feet (4,696 m) long and connected to a steel penstock. The water flowed from the penstock to two Pelton impulse waterwheels that turned two 1,200-kilowatt generators. The generators supplied power to the light bulbs in the powerhouse for the first time on October 7, 1904, and to the city of Seattle by January 31, 1905, through the newly established Seattle City Light.

The demand for power grew beyond the capacity of the original dam, power plant, and single transmission line, even though the amount produced by Cedar Falls by 1908 was four times the amount established in its original design.

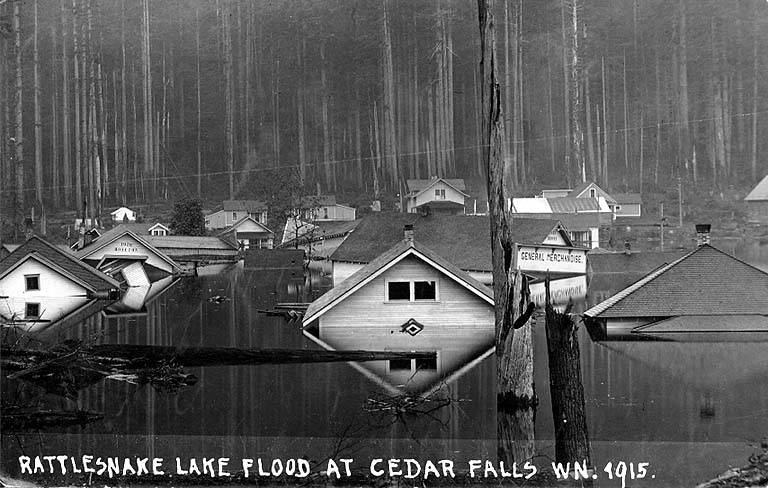
1915 flood

In 1912, voters approved $1.4 million in bonds to construct a masonry dam which would collect more water and stabilize seasonal fluctuations in the flow. The dam was approved by the Board of Public Works at Ross's urging, despite concerns from geologists about the integrity of the north side of the lake bed. In 1915, the new dam caused a rise in Rattlesnake Lake, destroying the town of Moncton. A second disaster occurred in December, 1918, when it began to rain while engineers were testing the dam; the rise in the lake caused a washout in Boxley Creek and destroyed the town of Edgewick.

In 1921, a 15,000-kilowatt unit expanded the capacity of the original units. Another 15,000-kilowatt unit was added in 1929. In 1930, the original generators were removed and sent variously to Ketchikan, Alaska and Brazil.

The first construction camp became the town of Cedar Falls. It was a joint-company town of Seattle City Light, Seattle Water Department, and Chicago, Milwaukee, St. Paul and Pacific Railroad, with each company providing separate housing and amenities for its employees and their families.

Seattle eventually purchased 91,000 acres of the upper Cedar River watershed to protect the water supply by prohibiting public access.
