= Heidi Durham =

American socialist and activist (1953–2015)

- Born: July 9, 1953; San Pedro, Los Angeles, California
- Died: August 23, 2015 (aged 62); Seattle, Washington
- Occupation: Electrician
- Employer: Seattle City Light
- Organization: Radical Women
- Political party: Freedom Socialist Party

Hildreth (Heidi) Durham was an American socialist feminist and labor activist with the Freedom Socialist Party and Radical Women. Durham was one of the first female electricians to work at Seattle City Light, where she faced significant barriers due to pervasive sexism and suffered a nearly fatal accident that left her paralyzed for the rest of her life. In 1991, Durham was a candidate in the Seattle City Council elections on the Freedom Socialist Party ticket with Yolanda Alaniz.

== Early life ==
Heidi Durham was born in 1953 in San Pedro, Los Angeles, California. Her mother was paralyzed due to multiple sclerosis, which created a consciousness around injustices for Durham at a young age. Her father was a minister who had been a conscientious objector during World War II and spoke out in favor of civil rights and against the Vietnam War. Her older siblings participated in anti-war protests at the University of California, Berkeley and in desegregation efforts with the Student Nonviolent Coordinating Committee (SNCC). Durham moved to the Pacific Northwest in 1971 to attend Western Washington University in Bellingham, Washington. In 1973 she moved to Seattle, where she was introduced to Radical Women by her sister, Guerry Hodderson, who was already a member.

== Seattle City Light career ==
Durham's acceptance letter into the Electrical Trades Trainee program

In 1974, Durham was recruited and accepted into the all-women Electrical Trades Trainee training program, an affirmative action program designed by Clara Fraser at Seattle City Light to integrate women into male-dominated trades jobs. Durham was the youngest trainee, having recently turned 21 when the program began. Two other members of Radical Women, Megan Cornish and Teri Bach, were also accepted into the program. The program was cancelled after the first week, however, due to souring relations between Fraser and management. After a year, eight of the ten female trainees were laid off, officially due to budget cuts but widely seen as an act of retaliation. Fraser was also terminated within months. Durham joined in a lawsuit along with seven of the other female trainees against Seattle City Light alleging discrimination on the basis of sex. In 1976, a court ruled in the women's favor, ordering City Light to reinstate them and make them eligible for apprenticeships.

Durham returned to City Light and was accepted as a lineworker apprentice following the court ruling. Management, angered by the order, intentionally placed Durham, along with the other two women apprentices, on teams that were known to be the most hostile. Durham's team, in particular, had members who were especially hostile and was supervised by a man known by everyone to be a sexist, racist, and heavy drinker. In addition, many male electricians who Durham worked with had become demoralized after a failed strike in 1975 and were angered by the women trainees' court victory. Durham faced persistent harassment and unfair performance evaluations in which she was given worse ratings than her male colleagues that accused her of not possessing adequate strength for the job. On July 1, 1977, the day after she was given a particularly bad evaluation, Durham fell 28 feet from a pole and broke her back. Durham was hospitalized for 13 weeks, during which she learned that her union, IBEW local 77, had issued an accident report claiming the accident was her own fault because she refused to listen to the advice of her male coworkers to get out of the trade. From her hospital bed, she organized with other members of her union to rewrite her accident report, to no avail. Despite the obvious and pervasive sexism she faced, Durham chose to not sue the union, as she did not want to sow further division among City Light workers.

After her recovery, City Light management offered Durham a secretary job, and she did not get to return to utility work for another three years. She believes that the decision to allow her to become a power station operator was motivated by the political pressure placed on City Light from Clara Fraser's lawsuit. Durham became junior power station operator at City Light and eventually rose to the rank of senior operator. In 1983, Durham worked with other women and pro-affirmative action men to establish the Employee Committee for Equal Rights at City Light (CERCL) to pressure the City of Seattle Human Rights Department to investigate instances of discrimination. She also helped to form and co-chair the Ad Hoc Committee for Fair Employment and Open Housing.

Durham stated that over time, Local 77 became more friendly to her and other women electrical workers, and many rank-and-file members came to respect the members of Radical Women for being hardworking, committed, and principled. In 1991 Durham was jointly awarded the Advocate of the Year award, along with Megan Cornish, by Washington Women in the Trades. She retired in 2004.

== City Council campaign ==
In 1991, Durham ran for City Council with Yolanda Alaniz, a Chicana feminist activist and member of Radical Women. Durham ran her campaign while continuing to work full time at City Light. Both candidates ran as members of the Freedom Socialist Party and campaigned on the demands of a guaranteed income for families living in poverty, community control of the police, and the extension of domestic partnership rights to same-sex couples. Durham lost in the primary round, but Alaniz advanced on to the general election and lost, finishing with 21% of the vote.

== Later life and death ==
Durham continued her involvement in political activism after her retirement. She remained a critic of conservative labor leaders and business-unionist trends in the AFL- CIO. In 2004, she served as a member of the Seattle Organizing Committee for the Million Worker March on Washington, DC, where she was a featured speaker.

Durham experienced long-term health effects from her injuries in 1977, causing her to walk with a crutch for the rest of her life. She died in 2015 at age 62 from early onset Alzheimer's disease, believed to be connected to her fall.
