= James Delmage Ross =

Canadian-American engineer and electric grid administrator (1872–1939)

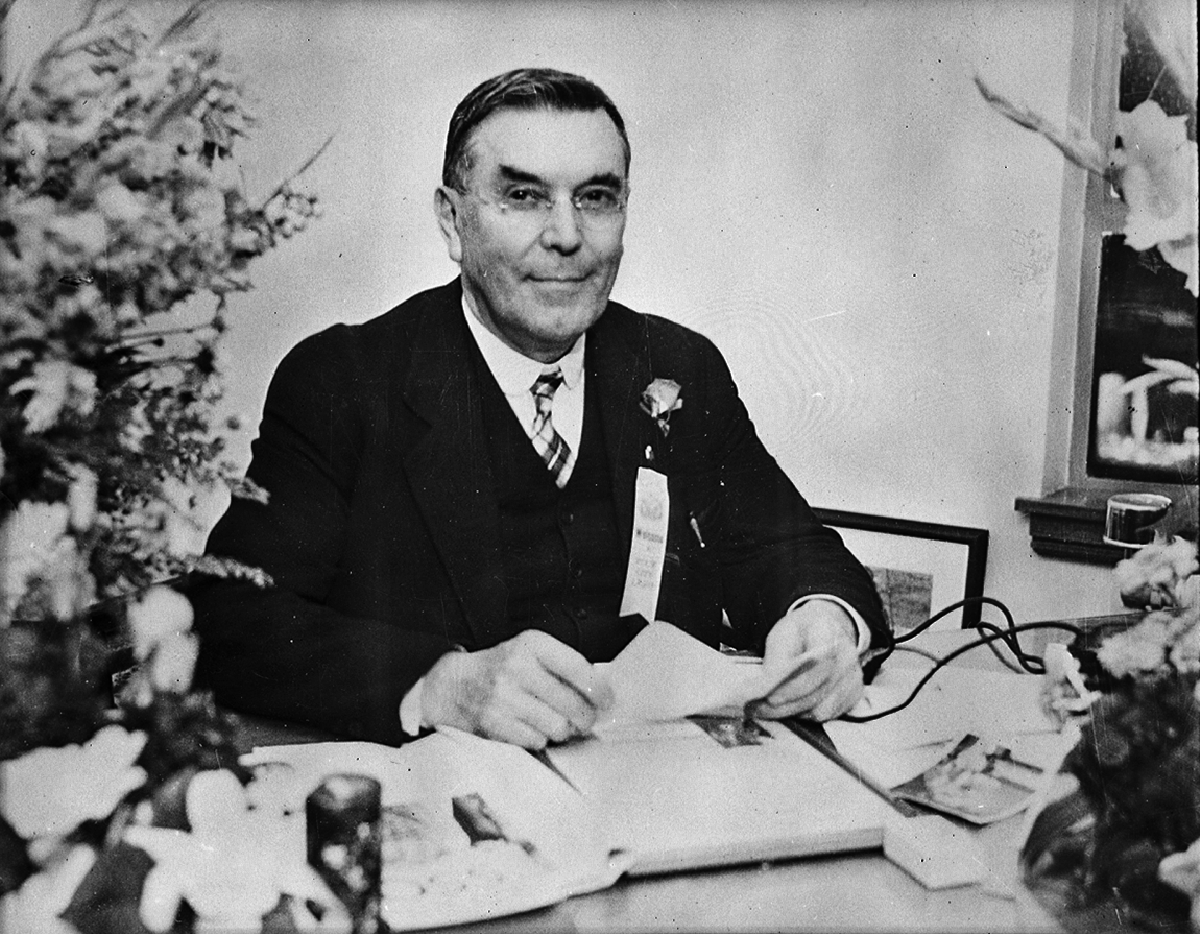
- Ross, 1930

Commissioner of the Securities and Exchange Commission
- In office August 23, 1935 – October 31, 1937
- President: Franklin D. Roosevelt
- Preceded by: Ferdinand Pecora
- Succeeded by: Jerome Frank

Personal details
- Born: November 9, 1872 Chatham, Ontario
- Died: March 14, 1939 (aged 66)
- Occupation: Engineer
- Known for: Skagit River Hydroelectric Project, Seattle Municipal Light and Power Plant, first administrator of Bonneville Power Administration

James Delmage Ross (November 9, 1872 – March 14, 1939) was the superintendent of lighting for Seattle for 28 years and was the first administrator of the Bonneville Power Administration. He was instrumental in developing the Cedar Falls and Skagit River hydroelectric power plants. A self-taught engineer, Ross advocated for public utilities and regional power networks. He also later served as a member of the Securities and Exchange Commission.

== Early life ==
Ross was born November 9, 1872, in Chatham, Ontario. His mother died when Ross was two years old. When he was 16, his father died.

Fascinated by science from a young age, Ross became an expert in electricity through books and experimentation. In 1891, he graduated from Chatham Collegiate Institute. After teaching school for six years, he headed to the Klondike gold fields in 1898. After a year and a half of prospecting, Ross moved to Anacortes, Washington where he was a steam engineer in a cannery. Later, he moved to Seattle to open his own electrical business.

== Seattle City Light ==
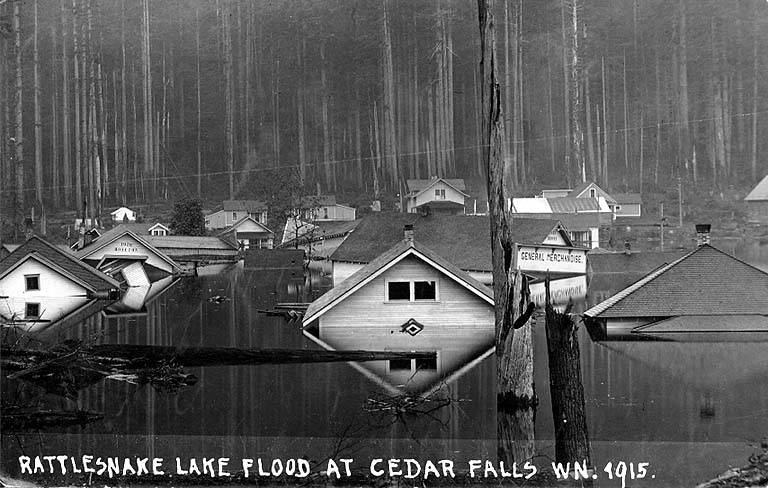
1915 flood

When Seattle voters approved a bond measure for a municipal power plant on the Cedar River, Ross developed blueprints for the infrastructure of what would become the Seattle Municipal Light and Power Plant and submitted them to the city engineer, Reginald H. Thomson. In 1903, Ross was appointed assistant city engineer and chief electrical engineer for Seattle. He began the Cedar Falls project with a timber dam which raised the river's level by 18 feet (5.5 m). The water was directed by the dam into an 49 inches (1,200 mm) diameter pipeline that was 15,407 feet (4,696 m) long and connected to a steel penstock. The water flowed from the penstock to two Pelton impulse waterwheels that turned two 1,200-kilowatt generators. The generators supplied power to the light bulbs in the powerhouse for the first time on October 7, 1904, and to the city of Seattle by January 31, 1905, through the newly established Seattle City Light.

Ross was appointed superintendent of lighting for Seattle in 1911, a position he would hold for 28 years. As superintendent, he instituted programs to make Seattle City Light a national model for municipal ownership, such as encouraging the use of electricity for home heating, cooking, and other appliances, and directly selling appliances to customers. He staffed each branch office with an appliance salesman, offered free appliance repair, and arranged for home economists to give lessons on new labor-saving devices. In the 1914 mayoral election, due the popularity of Ross's programs, both candidates promised that Ross would remain superintendent of lighting.

A masonry dam to replace the timber dam at Cedar Falls that Ross pushed for against geologists' warnings caused two floods, one in 1915 and one in 1918, the first destroying the town of Moncton and the second destroying the town of Edgewick.

During the early decades of the twentieth century, Seattle was a battleground between private and public utility interests. Ross was a proponent of municipal ownership of utilities, and felt the duplication of infrastructure by competing privately owned utilities was wasteful. Puget Sound Power & Light, a private utility company, frequently attacked City Light, and Ross personally, through the local newspapers, public campaigns, and in lawsuits.

When World War I began, the need for power to support war production multiplied. Ross obtained approval from the Department of Agriculture to build dams on the Skagit River as part of the Skagit River Hydroelectric Project, because Puget Sound Power & Light, which held permits to build there, had failed to begin construction within the required time. The city council approved $1.5 million in bonds for construction. The construction camp was set up at the mouth of Newhalem Creek, giving the unincorporated community its name.

Contractors built a 25-mile rail line to Gorge Creek, allowing Seattle City Light to control access to the area. After the railroad reached the site above Newhalem, a two-mile tunnel was dug between the dam and the powerhouse. Work was frequently delayed by floods, mudslides, and avalanches. The schedule was further delayed by workers leaving to hunt for gold, labor troubles, a forest fire, and a shortage of electricity. Although Ross had estimated that the Skagit River operation would provide electricity to Seattle by 1921, those various delays pushed the date to 1924. Ross oversaw the construction of three dams for the project: one on Gorge Creek, one in Diablo Canyon, and one at Ruby Creek. The Gorge Dam generators were formally started by President Calvin Coolidge on September 17, 1924.

From 1928 until the start of World War II, Ross began a program in which City Light offered guided tours of the Skagit Project. From Rockport, visitors rode City Light's steam locomotive 23 miles to Newhalem. Dormitories were provided, as were meals in The Gorge Inn. The next day, visitors boarded another train to Diablo, where they toured the powerhouse and rode an incline lift to the top of the dam. Next, they rode a barge or tour boat to Ruby Creek, then returned to Rockport. Over 100,000 people visited the Skagit Project by 1941. After the war, shortened tours resumed. Ross would personally narrate slide shows for the tours. Ross's hobby was gardening, which he put to good use creating tropical gardens at the Skagit River project.

In 1931, a charter amendment that would give Ross authority over engineering projects for City Light was on the ballot, which was opposed by political opponents and which local newspapers predicted would lose decidedly. On March 9, the day before the election, Seattle mayor Frank Edwards abruptly fired Ross for "inefficiency, disloyalty, and willful neglect of duty" and for "participation in politics". Although the mayor had expected the firing to become public the following day, The Seattle Star published a special late evening edition carrying a story by Ross and urging voters to pass the charter amendment. The amendment passed, and partisans of Ross began a recall campaign against the mayor. On July 13, 1931, voters elected a new mayor, Robert Harlin, who promptly appointed Ross back to his position. The controversy had gained attention outside of Washington. New York Governor Franklin D. Roosevelt sent Ross a letter of congratulations on his reappointment.

In 1937, supporters of Ross began raising funds to have his likeness carved into Mount Ross, however the project never came to fruition.

== Later endeavors ==
Ross was appointed to the Securities and Exchange Commission in 1935 by Roosevelt, who was now president. In 1937, Ross resigned from the SEC, and became the first administrator of the Bonneville Power Administration (BPA). Ross supported Roosevelt's intent that the BPA should give preference to rural communities. In a 1937 interview, Ross predicted "All the energy in the Columbia River Basin may not be needed right now, but the time is going to come when the country will use it—every single kilowatt of it. Just as someday there may be insufficient oil or coal in America, there also may be a shortage of electric power."

In 1931, Ross accepted Roosevelt's invitation to be a consulting engineer on New York's Saint Lawrence River project, the Moses-Saunders Power Dam.

While serving as BPA Administrator, he remained City Light's superintendent. In 1934, the Federal Power Commission (FPC) consulted him on the National Power Survey. In 1935, Ross was an advisory engineer to the Public Works Administration.

In 1938, Roosevelt was concerned by the results of a survey of the nation's power facilities by the FPC and War Department. Ross was directed to investigate the feasibility of linking power resources across the country, an idea that expanded on Ross's vision of a regional power network in the west. He advised the President that underground cables linking electrical supply would be "safer from aerial attack in time of war".

In his first BPA report, Ross revealed a master plan that would link Bonneville and the Grand Coulee dams with backbone lines connecting south to California, east to Montana, and southeast to Idaho.

== Personal life ==
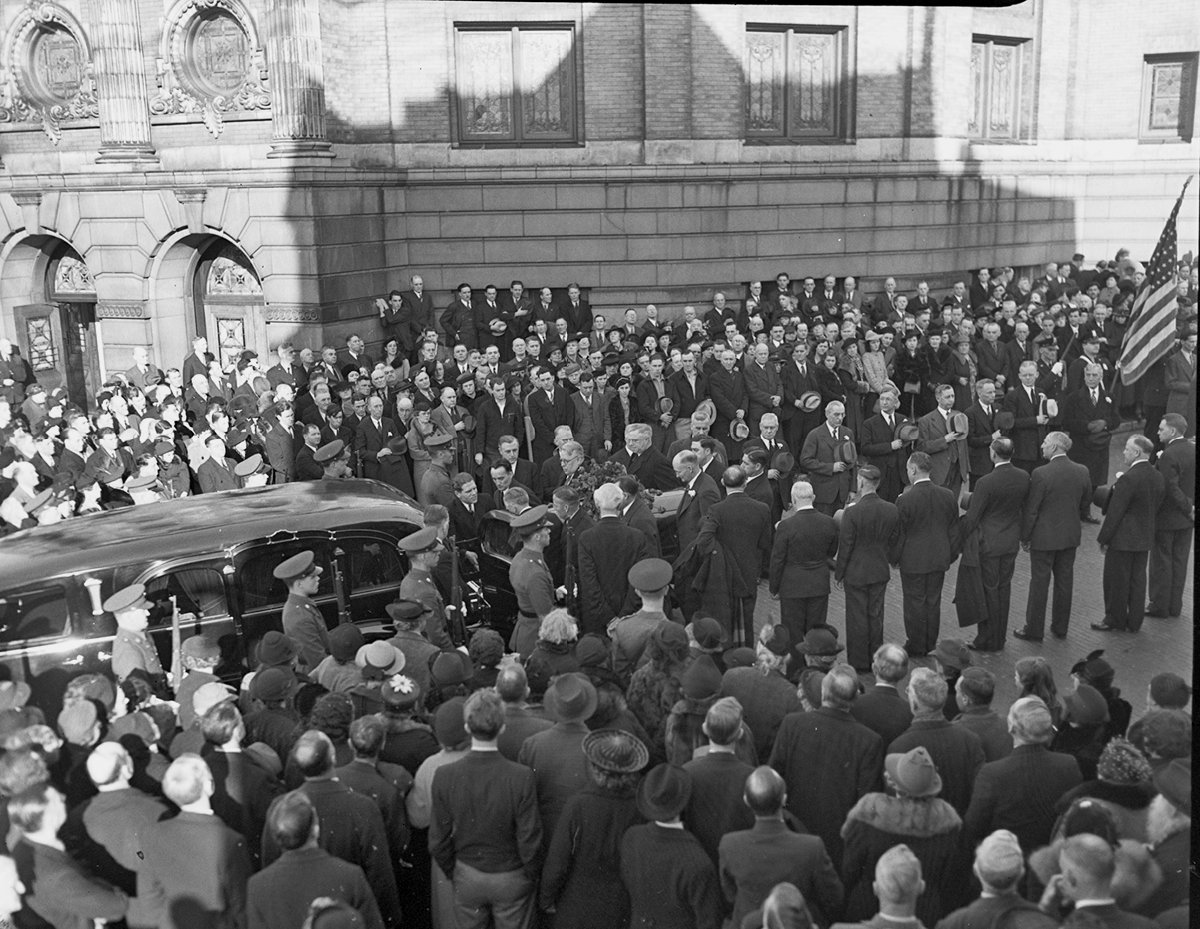
Funeral

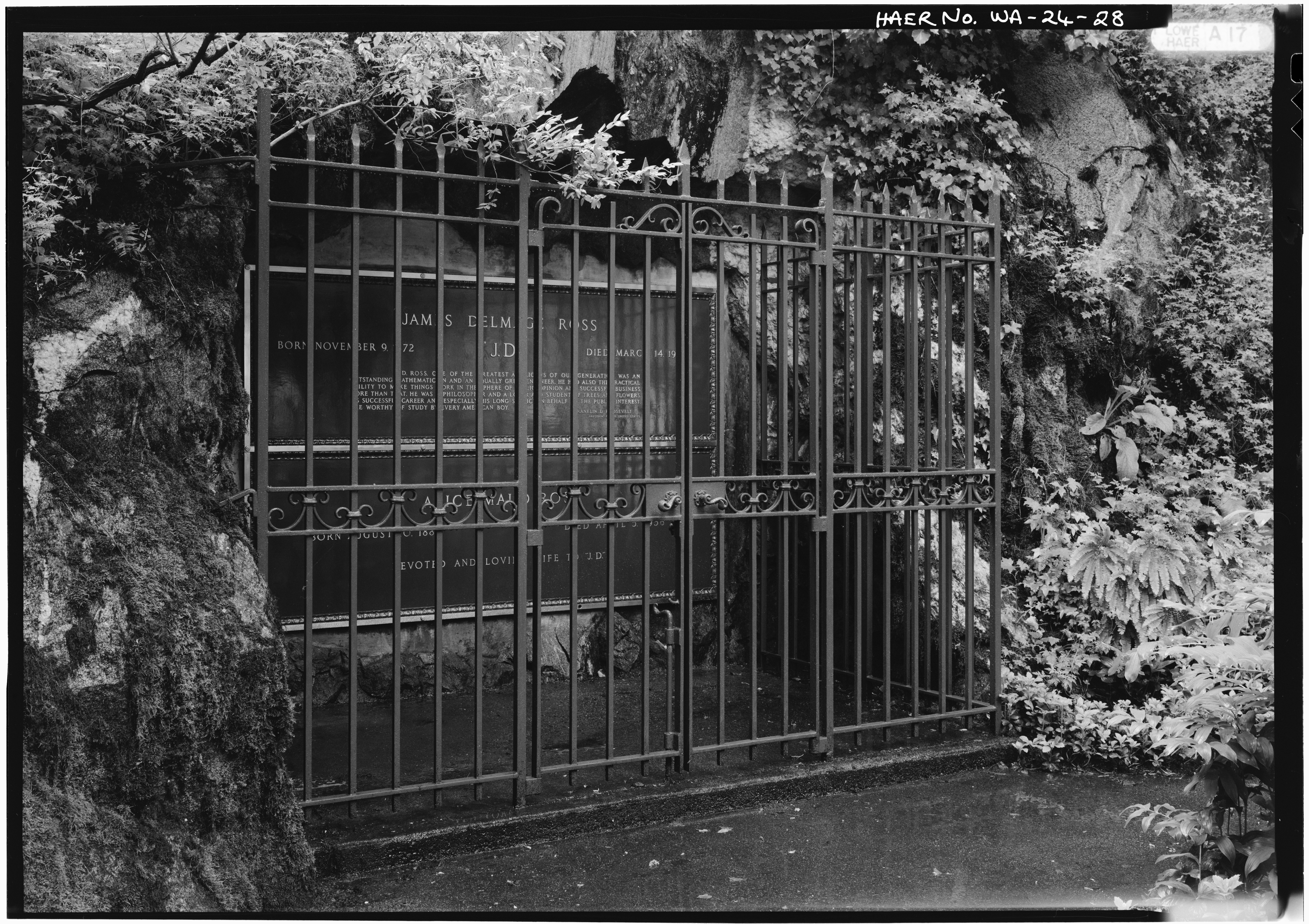
Burial site

Ross married Alice M. Wilson in 1907. They had no children.

Ross died on March 14, 1939, age 66, from a massive heart attack soon after an operation at the Mayo Clinic. Ross was buried at Mount Ross, in the heart of the Skagit Project. Alice died on April 5, 1956, at age 69, and was buried with Ross. Their graves are marked with a granite tomb with a bronze plaque embossed with a statement written by Roosevelt:

J. D. Ross, one of the greatest Americans of our generation, was an outstanding mathematician and an equally great engineer. He had also the practical ability to make things work in the spirit of public opinion and successful business. More than that, he was a philosopher and lover and student of trees and flowers. His successful career and especially his long service in behalf of the public interest are worthy of study by every American boy.

Ross Dam, the third Skagit River project dam which was completed the year after his death, Ross Lake, and Mount Ross were named in his honor. Ross Lake became part of Ross Lake National Recreation Area in October, 1968. BPA's Ross Complex in Vancouver, Washington, the agency's largest service hub, and an electrical substation within it are also named after him.
