= Freedom Socialist Party =

Trotskyist and socialist feminist American political party

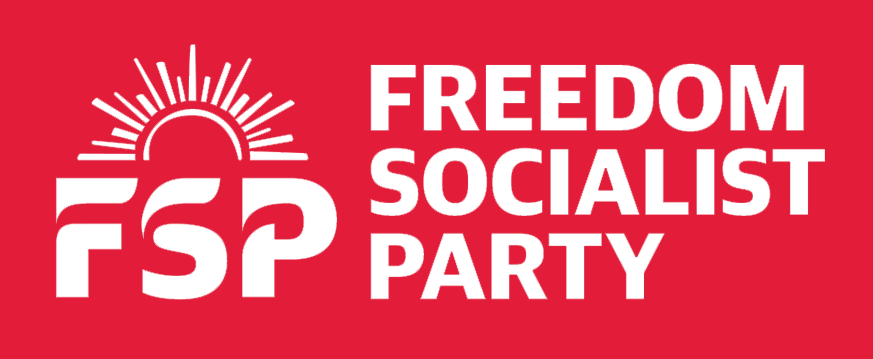
- Logo of the Freedom Socialist Party
- Founded: 1966; 60 years ago
- Split from: Socialist Workers Party
- Headquarters: Seattle, Washington
- Newspaper: The Freedom Socialist
- Ideology: Trotskyism; Revolutionary socialism; Socialist feminism
- Political position: Far-left
- International affiliation: Committee for Revolutionary International Regroupment (CRIR)
- Members in elected offices: 0

Website
- www.socialism.com

The Freedom Socialist Party (FSP) is a Trotskyist and socialist feminist political party in the United States. FSP formed in 1966, when its members split from the Socialist Workers Party. FSP views the struggles of women, people of color and sexual minorities as intrinsic to the struggle of the working class. Notable FSP members include Megan Cornish, Heidi Durham, Richard S. Fraser, and Clara Fraser.

== Membership ==
FSP has branches in the United States, as well as Australia, England, Germany and New Zealand. FSP is affiliated with Radical Women, a socialist feminist organization.

== History ==
Former FSP logo

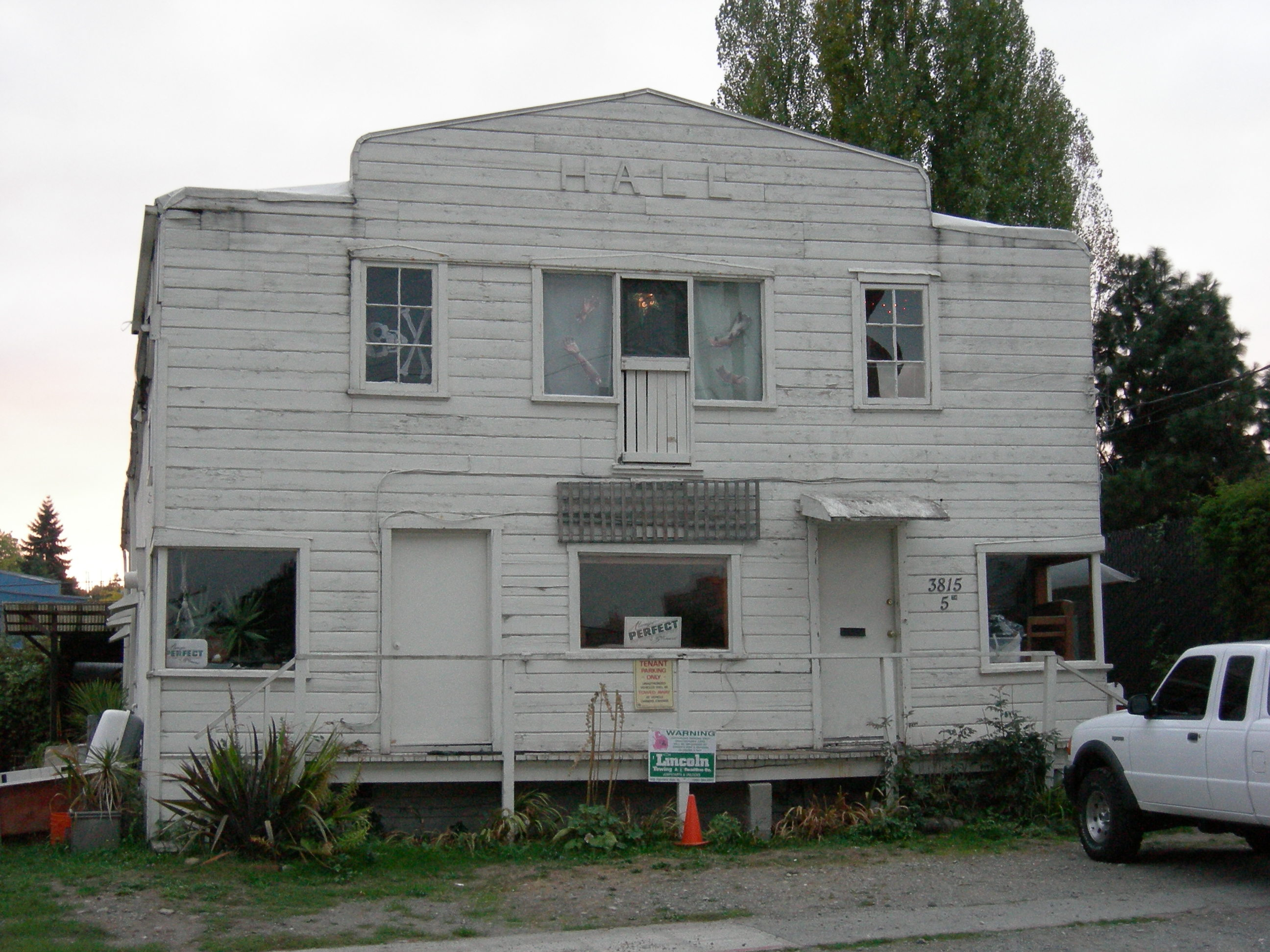
FSP was headquartered in Freeway Hall in Northlake, Seattle

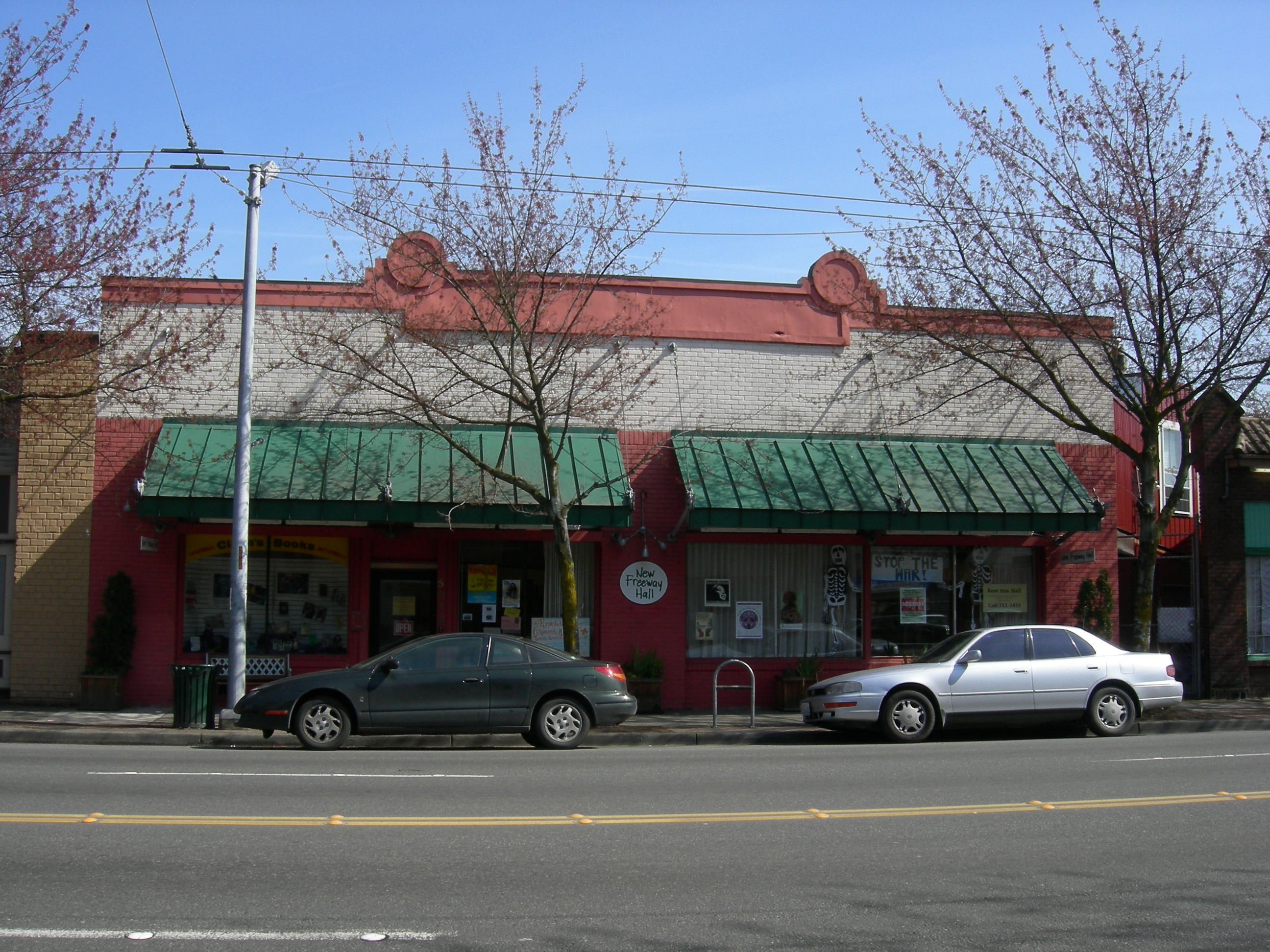
FSP is headquartered in New Freeway Hall in Columbia City, Seattle

=== Background ===
The immediate forerunner of FSP was the Kirk-Kaye tendency within the Socialist Workers Party (SWP), led by Richard S. Fraser (Kirk) and Clara Fraser (Kaye) who were then married.

The Kirk-Kaye tendency primarily disagreed with SWP leadership on three points: The Kirk-Kaye tendency supported revolutionary integrationism, in contrast to the SWP's support for Black nationalism and the Nation of Islam. The Kirk-Kaye tendency argued that socialist feminism must be a top priority for socialist organizations. And the Kirk-Kaye tendency claimed that the SWP was undemocratic.

=== Founding ===
FSP formed in 1966, when its members split from the Socialist Workers Party. The party's Seattle branch, with support from individuals in other cities, split off from the SWP over what it described as the SWP's entrenched opportunism and undemocratic methods.

FSP advocated for class solidarity of Black and White workers, called for a greatly expanded understanding of and attention to women's emancipation, and urged the anti-war movement to support the socialist, anti-colonial aims of the Vietnamese Revolution.

FSP became a pole of attraction for Seattle leftists opposed to the SWP's internal politics and established a home at Freeway Hall. The party formed Radical Women with the dual goal of building a revolutionary socialist feminist organization and teaching women the organizational and leadership skills that were often denied to them in male-dominated organizations.

=== Subsequent history ===
In 1978, FSP joined the Committee for a Revolutionary Socialist Party (CRSP), an attempted united front of Trotskyist parties. In 1980, CRSP collapsed.

In 1989, FSP founded the United Front Against Fascism (UFAF), an anti-fascist organization that included a broad coalition of the Left, the LGBT community, labor unionists, feminists, people of color, Jews, and civil libertarians. UFAF took the lead in mobilizing against neo-Nazis in the Pacific Northwest in the 1980s and 1990s.

In 1991, the Seattle FSP ran two members for Seattle City Council, Heidi Durham and Yolanda Alaniz, who campaigned on guaranteed income for families living in poverty, community control of the police, and domestic partnership rights for same-sex couples.

In 2003, Lyndon LaRouche filed a complaint with the Federal Election Commission that FSP's Red Letter Press and its managing editor, Helen Gilbert, had violated campaign finance laws. Gilbert had issued a pamphlet critical of LaRouche's ideology and political history. The FEC found LaRouche's complaint to be without merit and dismissed it.

== Ideology ==
FSP is a Trotskyist revolutionary socialist organization. FSP leaders Clara Fraser and Gloria Martin hoped to build a Leninist party that is "socialist-feminist" in ideology and practice.

FSP supports sending military aid to Ukraine.

== Election results ==
FSP has fielded electoral candidates in the United States for local, state, and federal offices. FSP candidates usually run as official FSP candidates.

To date, no FSP candidate has won an election.

=== Presidential elections ===
Year	Presidential candidate	Vice presidential candidate	Popular votes	%	Electoral votes	Result	Ballot access	Notes	Ref
2012	Stephen Durham	Christina López	117	0.00%	0	Lost	164 / 538	write-in campaign	

In 2016, FSP critically endorsed Jeff Mackler of Socialist Action for president.

In 2020, FSP again critically endorsed Jeff Mackler of Socialist Action for president.

In 2024, FSP declined to make a presidential endorsement and instead suggested voters spoil their ballots by writing-in "free Palestine."

=== Congressional elections ===
Year	Candidate	Chamber	State	District	Votes	%	Result	Notes	Ref
2018	Steve Hoffman	Senate	Washington	Class 1	7,390	0.43%	Lost	all-party blanket primary, did not advance to general	

=== State legislature elections ===
Year	Candidate	Office	Area	District	Votes	%	Result	Notes	Ref
2004	Jordana Sardo	State Representative	Oregon	45	2,297	8.74%	Lost	ran as Freedom Socialist Party candidate	
1998	Marian Sunde	State Senate	California	22	7,665	10.53%	Lost	ran as Peace and Freedom Party candidate	
1998	Adrienne Weller	State Representative	Oregon	18	496	3.99%	Lost	ran as independent candidate	
1998	Guerry Hoddersen	State Representative	Washington	37	1,439	4.56%	Lost	ran as Freedom Socialist Party candidate	
1998	Stephen Durham	State Assemblymember	New York	71	366	1.80%	Lost	ran as Freedom Socialist Party candidate	

=== Local elections ===
Year	Candidate	Office	Area	District	Votes	%	Result	Notes	Ref
2005	Linda Averill	City Council	Seattle	4	16,584	15.79%	Lost	all-party blanket primary, did not advance to general	
1991	Heidi Durham	City Council	Seattle				Lost	all-party blanket primary, did not advance to general	
1991	Yolanda Alaniz	City Council	Seattle	1	27,991	17.5%	Lost	general election	

== See also ==
- American Left
- Socialist Alternative (United States)
- Democratic Socialists of America
- Green Party of the United States
- History of left-wing politics in the United States
