= Brand.com =

Defunct American online reputation and brand management company

- Formerly: Reputation Changer
- Type: Private
- Industry: Public Relations
- Founded: 2009
- Defunct: 2015
- Headquarters: Philadelphia, Pennsylvania, United States
- Key people: Michael Zammuto, President, Dave Armon, CEO
- Website: http://www.brand.com/

Brand.com was an American online reputation and brand management company based in Philadelphia, Pennsylvania. It was founded as Reputation Changer in 2009. In 2013, it purchased the Brand.com domain name for $500,000, and changed its name. The company provided Internet search management, creating positive web articles about its clients in order to have them overtake negative news, and Wikipedia profile management. The company filed for bankruptcy in 2015 and was shut down.

== Reputation Changer ==
The company was founded in September 2009 as Reputation Changer, with its headquarters in West Chester, Pennsylvania. The company began as an online reputation management company offering services to small businesses and individuals.

To help improve online reputations, Reputation Changer created its own positive content about its clients, in an attempt to force other less flattering articles about them down in Google search results and thus cause criticisms to "disappear". Though during this time the company had been accused of "making false claims" about the effectiveness of their services, the company insisted that those claims were the result of rivals and not legitimate complaints. This includes the hiding of negative user-generated reviews for hotels and other commercial enterprises.

In November 2012, Michael Zammuto joined the company as President. This led to some restructuring within the company, including the June 2013 renaming of the company from Reputation Changer to Brand.com. The re-branding including the acquisition of the Internet domain brand.com for $500,000. The company also moved its headquarters from West Chester to Philadelphia, Pennsylvania. The company had 135 employees, and worked with both small and large clients. Seattle City Light hired Brand.com to remove a 2008 Seattle Weekly story critical of their CEO, Jorge Carrasco. Brand.com created several blog posts "to drown out critical stories" including one at Huffington Post where the writer did not disclose conflict of interest, subsequently leading to the article being removed. Ars Technica reported that some of the websites that the stories were posted on "appear to have been utterly fake". In May 2014, Seattle City Light requested a refund from Brand.com as they claimed the company did not deliver the services that were promised as the critical story still appeared high in Google searches. In September 2014 it was revealed that Brand.com had received a penalty from Google for potentially trying to game the system in increasing its own company's Google rankings. Brand.com contacted online websites directly to ask the removal of links to Brand.com.

== Services ==
Brand.com offered brand management and reputation management services. They reviewed the online presence of individuals and companies and provided action plans said to help control how information appears in search engines. Services also included suppression of negative reviews on sites like Yelp or Google Reviews. Part of these services was the planned launch of Brand.com's "Google Eraser", which claimed to expunge negative listings from a Google search. At the time, some stated that the process was unproven, and that Brand.com had not been transparent about its process, claiming that their processes were proprietary.

In 2013, Brand.com stated further that they would enact a De-Indexing Action Plan to permanently erase false or libelous information from major search engines, as opposed to attempting to move the negative information further down in search results. The process involved verifying that the information was false, and then working with Google, Yahoo, and Bing to de-index the information. The company created the Command Center platform, through which clients could monitor the results of its advertising or reputation management efforts.

Brand.com edited Wikipedia on behalf of clients. The company claimed on its website to have "built an entire practice around creating, managing, and monitoring Wikipedia." and offered to create a "positive Wikipedia page". Michael Zammuto told Quartz in 2013 that the company "helps ensure that information on Wikipedia is accurate, not false or defamatory." Brand.com also charged clients to have journalists write news stories under their direction, instead of having journalists independently select their own stories from news releases, and claims that these news stories have appeared in news publications including CNN, MSNBC, Fox News, The Huffington Post, and Forbes Magazine.

== Bankruptcy ==
Having released most of its workers in 2014, Brand.com filed for bankruptcy in 2015.

== See also ==
- Brand management
- Reputation management
