= Richard S. Fraser =

American socialist activist and political theoretician

Richard S. Fraser (30 June 1913 – 27 November 1988) was an American Trotskyist and the principal theoretician of the doctrine of revolutionary integrationism in the 1950s within the Socialist Workers Party (US), against George Breitman's advocacy of support for black nationalism. He joined the Trotskyist movement in 1934, and was a founding member of the Socialist Workers Party (SWP) in the US. He made a study of the black question in the late 1940s, after the Party began to lose hundreds of black recruits. This was due not only to the rise of McCarthyist repression of the SWP, but also, of the party's burgeoning opportunism on the question of black nationalism. Informally, the leadership had even begun discouraging white and black members from forming interracial couples.

In the 1950s, Fraser disputed the notion that blacks in the U.S. were a nation, pointing to the fact that they lacked a separate culture, language, and especially, geographic territory and autonomous market economy: the requirements for nationhood. The struggle for equality had always been the main goal and task of blacks in the U.S., argued Fraser in speeches he made and internal documents he wrote for the SWP. Nationalism was the product, not of hope for blacks, but arose during periods of despair and disillusionment when whites—capitalists during Reconstruction, trade union bureaucrats in the 20th century—betrayed them. In these writings and speeches, Fraser also carefully analyzed the historical, post-Civil War class structure and dynamics of the U.S. South and the U.S. in general, in the process updating W. E. B. Du Bois's Black Reconstruction. Fraser disputed the slogan of the SWP majority calling upon the U.S. to "Send Federal Troops to Mississippi," arguing that this was a reformist slogan building illusions in the benevolence of the U.S. ruling class and its state, and a capitulation to the middle-class reformist black leadership of the Civil Rights Movement.

Though he disagreed with them about the nature of the Cuban workers state, Fraser was a theoretical father figure to the SWP's Revolutionary Tendency (RT) led by James Robertson and Tim Wohlforth, later expelled when the RT opposed the reentry of the SWP into the United Secretariat of the Fourth International (USFI). Fraser himself left the SWP in the mid-1960s after the SWP refused to call for solidarity with the Viet Cong, and instead called for "Troops Out Now", a liberal slogan. With his wife Clara Fraser, Fraser formed the Freedom Socialist Party, but left as the result of a divorce/custody battle with Clara. He died on 27 November 1988.
