= Clara Fraser =

American activist

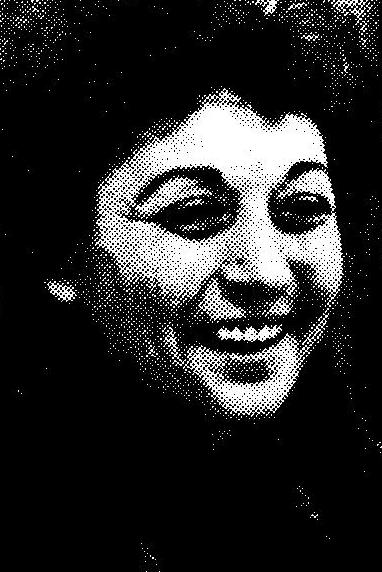
- Born: March 12, 1923; East Los Angeles, California, US
- Died: February 24, 1998 (aged 74)
- Organization: Radical Women
- Political party: Freedom Socialist Party

Clara Fraser (March 12, 1923 – February 24, 1998) was an American socialist feminist political organizer, who co-founded and led the Freedom Socialist Party and Radical Women.

== Biography ==
=== Early life and activism ===
Clara Fraser was born in 1923 to Jewish immigrant parents in multi-ethnic, working class East Los Angeles. Her father, Samuel Goodman, was a Teamster and anarchist. Her mother, Emma Goodman, was a garment worker and later a Business Agent of the International Ladies' Garment Workers' Union. Fraser joined the Socialist Party's youth group in junior high school.

By 1945, after graduating from the University of California, Los Angeles with a degree in literature and education, Fraser was a recruit to the ideas of Leon Trotsky, whose campaign against Stalinism had gained adherents worldwide. She joined the Trotskyist Socialist Workers Party (SWP) that year. Fraser moved to Chicago and participated in a union drive at a department store. In 1946, she moved to the Pacific Northwest to help build the SWP's Seattle branch.

As an assembly line electrician, Fraser joined the Boeing Strike of 1948. When the union was slapped with an anti-picketing injunction, she put together a mothers' brigade to walk the line with baby strollers. After the strike, Boeing fired and blacklisted Fraser, and the FBI pursued her for a decade.

=== Organizing the Freedom Socialist Party and Radical Women ===
In the 1950s and 1960s, Fraser stayed active in the labor arena, worked to end segregation, advocated for women, and opposed the Vietnam War. She worked with her then-husband, Richard S. Fraser, in developing Revolutionary Integration to explain the interdependence of the struggles for socialism and African American freedom and argue the key importance of Black leadership for the U.S. working class.

Within the SWP, Fraser opposed the party's support for the Nation of Islam. The Seattle local conducted a long campaign to try to win the national party to its perspective, but a clampdown on internal party democracy brought this effort to a dead end. Fraser co-authored the branch's critique of the SWP's political and organizational degeneration in a series of documents that have been re-published under the title Crisis and Leadership (Seattle: Red Letter Press, 2000).

The Seattle branch left the SWP in 1966 and launched the Freedom Socialist Party (FSP), founded on a program emphasizing the leadership role of the underprivileged in achieving progress for all of humanity. In 1967, Fraser formed Radical Women (RW), along with Gloria Martin and young women of the New Left. RW's ambition was to teach women leadership, theoretical skills, class consciousness.

=== Seattle City Light Career and Discrimination Lawsuits ===
After being fired by Boeing and blacklisted as a communist by the FBI, Fraser struggled to find stable employment. Fraser took a job as a receptionist in a psychologist's office, where her communist affiliations were accepted, and worked there for seven years. Fraser was then hired as a job coordinator for a federal anti-poverty program, where she worked until she was recruited by Seattle City Light.

In 1973, Fraser began work at Seattle City Light as a training and education coordinator. Fraser was charged with designing and implementing an all-female Electrical Trades Trainee (ETT) affirmative action program to integrate women into the trades. Fraser's hiring and the creation of an all-female ETT program was a calculated political move by Gordon Vickery, the superintendent of City Light at the time. Vickery, the former chief of the Seattle Fire Department, had been exploring the possibility of running for mayor. He was appointed to the superintendent position by Seattle mayor Wes Uhlman in an attempt to forge an alliance and prevent a future electoral challenge. In his role, Vickery was tasked with reducing City Light's budget through work speed-ups and wage cuts. Vickery and Uhlman chose to hire Fraser, a known radical, to implement a successful program for a few women in the hopes of avoiding discrimination lawsuits like the ones filed against the city by Black workers in the late 1960s. In addition, Vickery hoped to make a successful ETT program for women a cornerstone of his experience in future electoral campaigns.

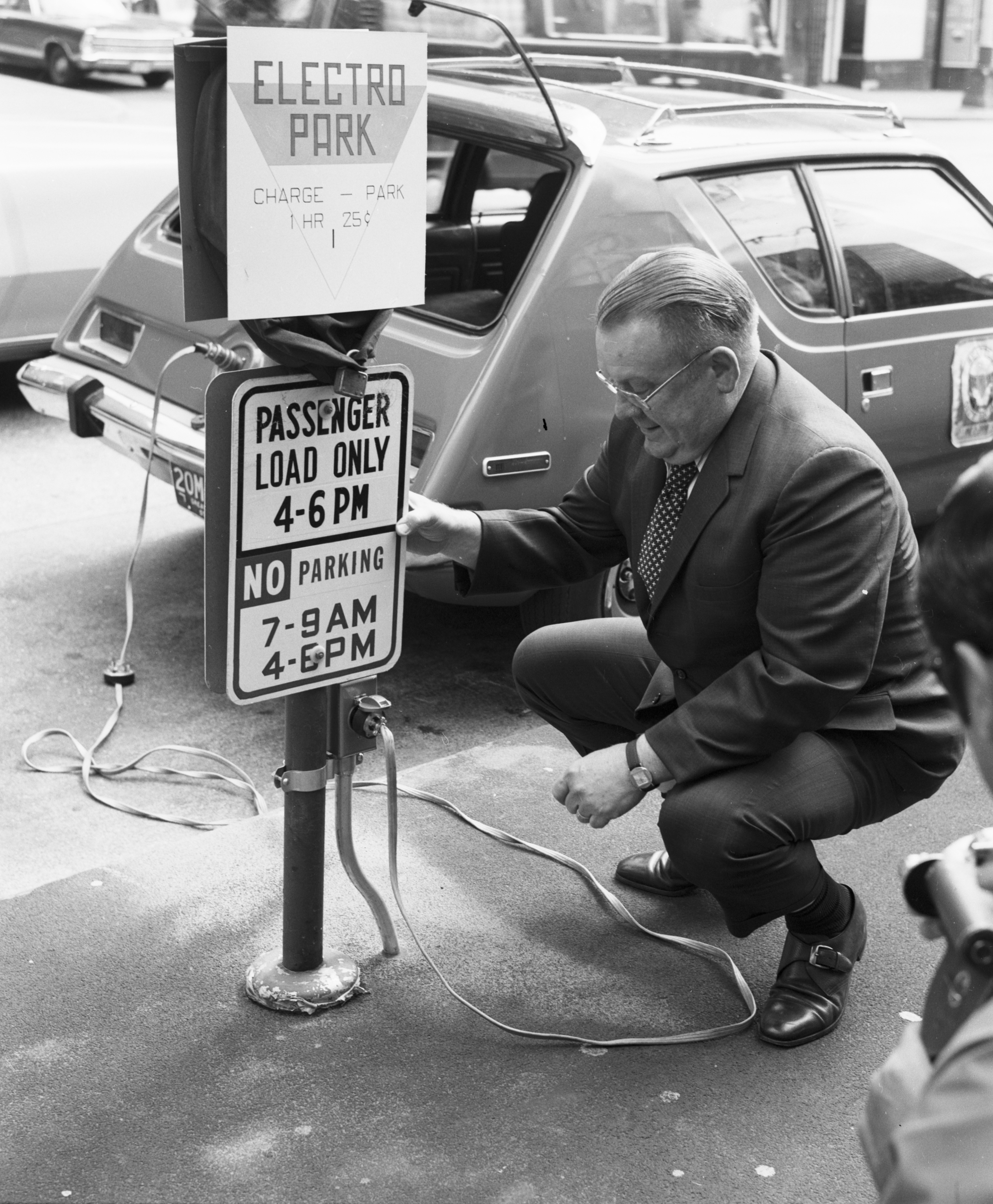
City Light Superintendent Gordon Vickery, 1973

As a recruiter for the ETT program, Fraser used her connections and targeted the feminist community, resulting in over 400 women applying for the ten open positions. Three of the trainees selected (Megan Cornish, Heidi Durham, and Teri Bach) were members of Radical Women, and there were trainees who were members of other feminist groups. In redesigning the program, Fraser diverted from strategies employed by an earlier series of failed affirmative action programs at City Light for Black men. The women were trained and worked together, instead of being spread out into all-male divisions. The trainees were given two weeks of physical and classroom instruction, including swimming. In addition, the trainees were allowed membership into the union, IBEW Local 77, as soon as they began the program.

In 1974, Vickery released a new employee code of conduct that was considered by many to be draconian. In response, City Light employees organized a walkout on April 10, 1974. Over 1000 people participated, and the support of mostly female non-unionized clerical workers, organized by Fraser, was essential to the walkout's success. Vickery's new rules were dropped, and a greater sense of solidarity emerged in the workplace strengthening Fraser's relationship with the IBEW. Relations between Fraser and Vickery, however became hostile as a result of the walkout. Fraser was removed from her position as the ETT coordinator, and a paper trail of memos revealed increased micro-management from Vickery and her superiors. Fraser was laid off without notice in July 1975, officially due to budget cuts, but the move was largely seen as an act of retaliation. In September 1975, the ETT program was terminated, and all but two of the trainees were laid off. Originally, Fraser was refused unemployment benefits and ordered to pay back severance fees she had already received. These charges were dropped. however, after Fraser protested publicly. In June 1976, the training and education coordinator position that Fraser had occupied was refilled by a man who had less experience.

Following her dismissal, Fraser filed a discrimination complaint that documented pervasive political bias and sexism. After a seven-year battle, Fraser was victorious in a ruling that affirmed the right of workers to speak out against management and to organize on their own behalf. She returned to her former job at City Light just as a new furor broke out over discrimination against women in non-traditional trades. Fraser joined with women in the field and the offices and pro-affirmative action men to form a new organization to combat sex and race discrimination: the Employee Committee for Equal Rights at City Light (CERCL).

=== Freeway Hall case ===
In 1984, an ex-FSP member named Richard Snedigar brought a harassment lawsuit against Fraser, seven other party leaders, and the organization as a whole. This case came to be known as the Freeway Hall case.

Snedigar wanted to take back a substantial donation given years before to a fund for obtaining a new headquarters after the party was evicted from its home base at Freeway Hall. He also demanded FSP minutes, membership lists, and names of contributors. At one point, Fraser and the party's attorneys were sentenced to jail for refusing to divulge financial information, but their sentences were stayed and ultimately overturned. The FSP pursued this case to the state Supreme Court, where civil liberties attorney Leonard Boudin argued that privacy rights are essential to the freedom to express dissent. The FSP was finally vindicated in 1992.

=== Later life and death ===
Clara Fraser had two sons, Marc and Jon. She died on February 24, 1998, from emphysema.

== Philosophy and Political Thought ==
Clara Fraser had emphasized that a feminism focused only on feminism would be insufficient, and thought that ultimately, it wouldn't realize its own goals. As she said, "the logic of feminism is to expand inexorably into a more generalized radicalism." The oppression of different sexes, classes, and so on all depend upon each other, and so, focusing on any single issue would be a detriment to the others. In the case of feminism, "single-issue feminism" would inevitably be dominated by white, upper-class women, who would think that they're representing all women. There are many quotes throughout her writing that express this view:

"The single- issue is the dead-end issue. It always ends up smack against the wall. True, it is large, but it is also, invariably, diffuse, ambiguous, contradictory, deceptive and mercurial... It moves to the right, not to the left, and it moves radicals along with it."

"Without [socialist feminist] leadership, the women's movement, like every other movement, will petrify, corrode, adapt and drown inside the Democratic Party or inane, single-issue liberalism. Or it will adopt an ultra-left, insanely sectarian and/or terroristic stance, born of desperation and bitterness."

Clara Fraser expresses many of her views in her book Revolution, She Wrote. In her paper "How Marxists Think", she expresses a disdain for classical logic. In her summary of Aristotle, Aristotle had contributed three laws to formal logic:

1. "A" equals A: the law of identity. A thing is always equal to itself.
2. "A" cannot be non-A: the law of contradiction.
3. "A" cannot be both A and non-A: the law of the excluded.

Fraser cites five critiques of these laws:

1. These laws are only true if one assumes the world is something fixed and unchanged. Nothing moves and develops, because motion implies self-contradiction. As she says, "Does a dollar always equal a dollar? Hardly."
2. Formal logic creates impassable barriers between things, but in reality, everything grows out of and into other things: paper into money, and money into paper again; rivers into seas and seas into clouds; bacteria into animals and animals into humans.
3. A can equal not a; formal logic has too rigid a view of identity. The working class for example, is a heterogenous and contradictory mass. In her words, "a worker is not a boss, but can think and act like one."
4. These laws present themselves as absolute, final, and eternal. But in reality, everything is relative, inter-dependent and changing, and as a consequence, so are the laws of governing them.
5. The laws of formal logic cannot explain themselves; they cannot account for their own origin or cause of being.

This is where Hegel and Marx come in for Fraser. Fraser states that Hegel had realized these flaws and developed a logic which had taken motion and change into account, but was still plagued by a kind of idealism, a privileging of non-material substances (such as the Absolute Spirit) over material conditions. This is where Marx "fixes" Hegel, seeing change rooted in the natural conditions of a society. Fraser states that all science is the study of the motion and behavior that matter, and Marxism is simply the study of human motion and social behavior.

== See also ==
- Megan Cornish
- Heidi Durham
- Seattle City Light
- Freedom Socialist Party
- Radical Women
