= Megan Cornish =

American activist

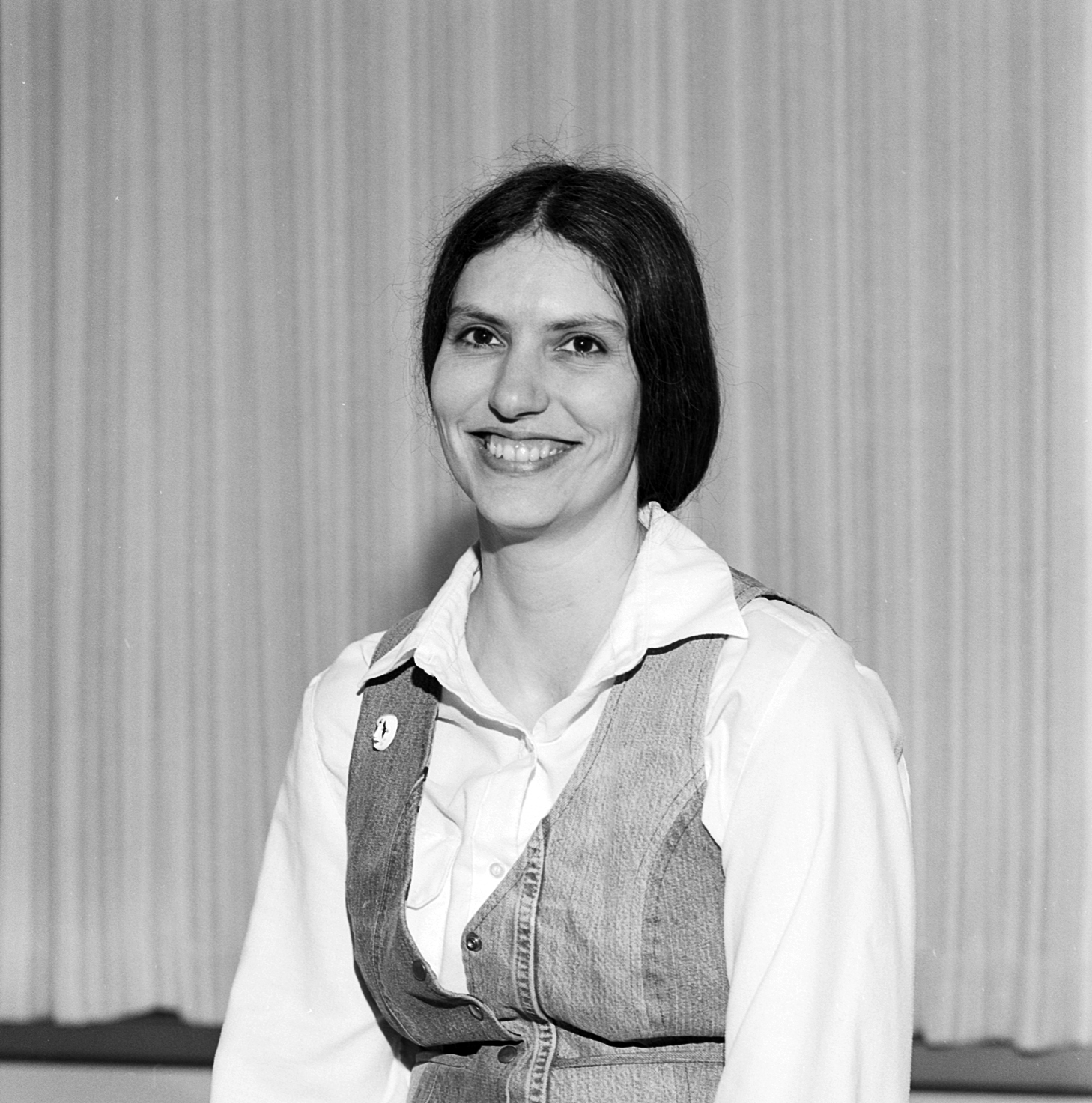
- Cornish during her apprenticeship, circa 1974
- Pronunciation: may-GON CORN-ish
- Born: May 27, 1947 (age 79); Oswego, New York
- Occupation: Electrician
- Employer: Seattle City Light
- Organization: Radical Women
- Political party: Freedom Socialist Party

Megan Cornish (born May 27, 1947) is an American socialist feminist and labor activist with the Freedom Socialist Party (FSP) and Radical Women, as well as a retired electrician with Seattle City Light. Cornish became an electrician after participating in an affirmative action program in 1974. Much of her activism work has focused on fighting workplace discrimination at Seattle City Light.

== Early life ==
Cornish was born on May 27, 1947, into a military family in Oswego, New York, and spent her childhood in various locations around the United States. Cornish says she was drawn to feminism after reading The Feminine Mystique, describing the book's effect on her as "like a bomb had been dropped." After graduating from Cornell University in 1969 with a BA in literature, Cornish moved to the Puget Sound region and worked at The Shelter Half, a GI coffeehouse, as part of the anti-war movement in Tacoma, Washington. It was at this time that Cornish became involved with the labor, anti-war, and desegregation movements. She was arrested while participating in a demonstration on behalf of the United Construction Workers Association. Her activism focused on creating employment opportunities in the trades for black men, and she later stated that "it never dawned on me that I may ever [seek trades employment]."

=== Involvement in Radical Women ===
In her early years in the Pacific Northwest, Cornish was not a member of a formal group or organization, but she joined Radical Women in 1972 after being drawn to the group's intersectional approach, saying they "put it all [Black civil rights, desegregation, anti-war, labor, women's liberation, etc.] together." It was her involvement in Radical Women that first pushed Cornish to seriously think about the role of the working class and she become more interested in labor organizing. She took a job at a nursing home where another member of Radical Women worked as a union organizer. She briefly worked in an industrial laundry facility, but quit after becoming frustrated with the conservative and undemocratic practices of the Teamster leadership. In 1974, Cornish, along with other members of the FSP and Radical Women, picketed in a strike of clerical and maintenance workers at the University of Washington, which she later described as an early expression of comparable worth.

== Career and organizing at City Light ==
=== Electrical Trades Trainee program ===
In 1974, Cornish was persuaded by Clara Fraser, a cofounder of Radical Women and education coordinator at Seattle City Light, to apply for a position as an Electrical Trades Trainee (ETT), an all-female affirmative action program designed by Fraser to integrate women into the electrical trades. Gordon Vickery, the former fire chief and superintendent of City Light, was exploring the possibility of running for mayor and hoped to cite the successful completion of a female ETT program as a cornerstone of his experience in future elections. To increase the chances of the program's success, Fraser was hired to redesign the ETT program in a way that did not duplicate failed affirmative action programs for black men at the company. Unlike in the previous programs, the female ETT members were given extra training and allowed to join the IBEW Local 77 with their own bargaining unit within the union.

Shortly before her training began, an eleven-day employee walkout in response to a new disciplinary code proposed by Vickery shut down City Light. Fraser participated in the walkout and organized other, mostly female, non-unionized clerical workers to join, whose support proved essential to the walkout's success. While this strengthened Fraser's relations with the IBEW and mostly male electrical workers, her relations with Vickery and management were left in shambles. Fraser was terminated the following year in an act seen by her supporters as retaliation.

Cornish was selected to be one of ten female ETTs out of an application pool of over 300. The sense of solidarity between workers as a result of the walkout caused Cornish and the other female ETTs to be received "mostly warmly." The shared resentment towards Vickery and management created a sense of unity amongst the mostly male electrical workers and reduced their hostility towards their new female coworkers. The severed relationship between Fraser and management, however, left the ETTs in a highly vulnerable position as management sought to retaliate against Fraser by damaging the ETT program.

Only a week after starting, Vickery cancelled the ETT training program and removed Fraser from her position as the training coordinator. Trainees were told on a Friday afternoon to report to field work the next week, where they made $1 less per hour than the other electrical helpers. In response, the ETTs filed a complaint with the City of Seattle Office of Women's Rights (OWR), stating that they were being denied the typical amount of training and pay reserved for male employees. Following an organizing meeting led by the walkout leaders that many of the trainees attended, Vickery called the women into his office and forced them to sign a loyalty oath pledging to fulfill their employment obligations without complaint. After a year of training, Cornish and seven of the other ETTs were laid off, along with Fraser. Like Fraser, the ETTs saw their terminations as politically motivated and retaliatory, and they added the layoffs to their OWR complaint.

As their case was being reviewed by the OWR, the former ETTs engaged in a massive public relations campaign to win the support of the public. Numerous articles about the case were published in the Seattle Times, Seattle Post-Intelligencer, The Daily, and other local media, and the case became a central focus of the local women's movement. In addition, the ETT case damaged then-mayor Wes Uhlman's credibility as a progressive, in part leading to the failure of his 1976 gubernatorial campaign. In a July 1976 major victory for the former ETTs, City Light was ordered to reinstate six of the terminated trainees, including Cornish, as well as to pay a settlement, give them back pay, and make them eligible for apprenticeship programs.

=== Lineworker apprenticeship and career ===
In the time between her termination and rehiring, Cornish worked as a house wiring apprentice through IBEW Local 46. After the July 1976 victory in court, Cornish applied for a City Light apprenticeship as a lineworker alongside two other Radical Women members named Teri Bach and Heidi Durham. Cornish described the period during which she and the other female trainees returned to work after winning their court case as the "roughest" time during her career at City Light. Vickery and other management, angered by the ruling, placed Cornish and her female colleagues into positions that were designed to be the most difficult to succeed in. Each of the women were placed into divisions that were known to be dangerous, which ultimately led to Durham falling from a pole and breaking her back in a near-fatal accident.

In addition to being antagonized by management, Cornish and the other women apprentices were also met with animosity from the male electrical workers that they worked alongside. In 1975, Local 77 of the IBEW staged a strike for 98 days, the longest public worker strike in Washington history. Despite the strike's longevity, the electricians were unable to gain the support of their larger union and they were forced to settle for an unfavorable contract. While the electricians did win a wage increase, the new contract also created harsher working conditions. Many male electricians, frustrated and demoralized by their strike's defeat, held resentment towards the former ETTs for winning their discrimination case, and these feelings were exploited by management to increase the sexist hostility of the work environments.

Despite having an affirmative action plan in place to diversify its workforce, Cornish, Bach, and Durham remained some of the only female electrical workers at City Light for nearly ten years. The three regularly gave public comment at Seattle City Council meetings to demand the hiring of more women and people of color at City Light. In the early 1980s, City Light hired its first new female electrical worker in nearly a decade.

In 1983, Cornish helped establish the Employee Committee for Equal Rights at City Light (CERCL) to fight workplace harassment and discrimination in response to inaction from management, union leaders, and the City of Seattle Human Rights Department (HRD). CERCL membership grew rapidly in the mid-1980s and pressured the HRD to investigate discrimination cases. In 1991, Cornish and Durham were jointly named Advocate of the Year by the Washington Women in the Trades.

== Retirement ==
Cornish retired from Seattle City Light in 2004 after 30 years. At the time of her retirement, she held the position of outage dispatcher, the highest position in the utility trades. She credits her adherence to feminism and political radicalism as essential to her accomplishments in organizing at City Light. She remains an active member of Radical Women and the Freedom Socialist Party and continues to write for the Freedom Socialist newspaper. Cornish's organizing activities at City Light are the subject of the book High Voltage Women published in 2019.

== See also ==
- Heidi Durham
- Clara Fraser
- Seattle City Light
- Freedom Socialist Party
- Radical Women
