= Revolutionary integrationism =

School of thought in Black American working-class politics

Revolutionary Integrationism is an analysis, philosophy, and program for resolving the "black question"—the problem of the oppression of blacks, and their liberation—in the United States.

== Origins ==
Revolutionary Integrationism has its origins in the fight against slavery by Frederick Douglass and other abolitionists before the Civil War, and in the "New Negro" movement in the 1900s–1910s around the Crisis journal's 1919 articles by NAACP field marshal Walter White and other of his writings, Carrie Clifford, Alfred Kreymborg, and especially, the black Communist poet Claude McKay, Max Eastman's and Crystal Eastman's Liberator, as well as A. Philip Randolph's and Chandler Owen's Messenger. In the 1930s through 1960s, the RI doctrine was developed in the main by Trotskyists–Max Shachtman, Oliver Cox, Daniel Guérin, Richard S. Fraser, James Robertson, as well as by non-Trotskyists such as James Baldwin. These activists argued that the struggle for equality by blacks in the United States was the main current in black history, and that equality could only be accomplished via a socialist revolution by the entire working class. They disagreed with the opinion of socialist thinkers like Leon Trotsky and C. L. R. James in the 1930s, and with George Breitman and the majority of the Socialist Workers Party (US) in the late 1950s. Such thinkers argued that Black nationalism was a transitional demand toward socialism. They also disagreed with Joseph Stalin and his followers in the Communist Party USA (CPUSA), who initiated this adaptation to black nationalism within the U.S. Marxist movement.

Revolutionary integrationism disputes the assertion of these thinkers, and other leftists and liberals, that blacks in America potentially constitute a "nation", that blacks require separate organizations from whites, and that such organizations might constitute a separate or autonomous second "vanguard", which would cooperate, but not be integrated into, a "white" Marxist American vanguard party.

Revolutionary Integrationists argue that equality rather than national liberation should be advocated by revolutionary socialists, that this equality can be accomplished through a class struggle of black and white workers and that such a revolution can be led by members of both races. It was most strongly opposed during the 1960s to the ideas of Malcolm X, the Black Panther Party and other Black Nationalist organizations.

== Negating the notion of a "Black Nation" ==
A central part of this idea is the rejection of the possibility of African Americans forming a distinct nation in the United States.

- The Southern "black belt" alleged basis for a black nation is a statistical-geographical fiction cobbled together by the Stalinists.
- By the criteria of nationhood put forward by Stalin, U.S. blacks do not constitute a nation, because they do not possess either a separate language or culture. Especially, despite the assertions of black nationalists that "white America" constitutes an oppressor nation, the alleged black "nation" lacks a separate or autonomous geographic territory on which there is or potentially might be created a separate capitalist market economy, which is "oppressed" by some foreign imperialist power.
- Black nationalism is not the essential thrust of U.S. black history: it is instead, like the Zionist movement in Europe among Jews, the product of the desires of a petit bourgeois stratum of blacks to elevating themselves politically and economically, to become capitalist politicians and capitalists, at the expense of their working class followers, by gaining their votes for political careers within the Democratic Party, and/or by exploiting them as a superoppressed labor force (much like, as in Chinatown, Chinese sweatshop owners exploit their own).
- Besides these cynical self-aggrandizing motives of the black petit bourgeoisie, the appeal and attraction of black nationalism only gains ground among black working class and poor people during times of desperation about the basic struggle for equality. For example, Martin Delany's black nationalist novel Blake: or the Huts of America was written before the Civil War, when, ironically, Delany felt things were hopeless in the U.S. In the 1960s, black nationalism arose with the McCarthyite repression of trade union militants in the CIO, the CIO's fusion with the AFL and their turning firmly toward the Democratic Party, the growth in the power of anti-communist trade union bureaucrats, and their resort to racism to maintain a loyal following. The early industrial organizing days of the CIO, and the organizing efforts in Harlem and other places by the Communist Party, were radical, integrationist, inspiring hope among black workers that racial barriers would be overcome: thus the black nationalism of the Marcus Garvey movement and the Black Muslims was on the wane in the mid-1930s.

== Capitalism and racism ==
The Revolutionary Integrationists argue that:

- White racism against blacks is not the product of some inner "imperialism", "urge for domination", "male sexual competition", "innate inability to accept the Other", etc. Such explanations are all products of liberal idealism, not historical materialism.
- Racism arises with the rise of capitalism: it is not expressed in the ancient world, nor in much of the feudal era. It gains ground as the feudal mode of production begins to deteriorate. The Jews, losing their status as a feudal caste (See Abraham Leon, The Jewish Question: A Marxist Interpretation) become the scapegoats of choice for the developing capitalist class. Against the Irish, as Cox pointed out, British racism becomes a justification for the exploitation of the British working class. Against Africans, it becomes a rationale for their capture and enslavement in the U.S., and a means by which they are isolated from white farmers and workers, by the capitalist class. Today it is used by the capitalist class to divide the working class against itself, to privilege one sector of the working class, the whites (or to make them think they are privileged when day by day their own oppression actually grows), against the others (blacks, Latinos, Arabs, etc.), to prevent the working class from uniting. It also rationalizes the superexploitation of workers of color, and the forcing of them into the category of a permanent reserve army of labor of the chronically unemployed.
- The history of the southern United States is not a history of a "southern ruling class" maintaining Jim Crow out of motives purely or mainly of racism. Since the Civil War broke the old Southern planter class, the South and its politicians, such as Strom Thurmond, etc. have been controlled by Northern corporations. U.S. Steel, for example, with offices in the North, provided funding for demagogues like Thurmond, who, in 1948, ran on a platform of segregation and fierce resistance to anti-lynch laws in Congress.
- In the Civil Rights era of the 1950s and 60s, it is not the case that the Northern-based ruling capitalist class of the South as well as North switched sides and became firm liberal champions of racial integration. Instead, the U.S. capitalist class, particularly its multinational corporate wing which at the time supported the Democratic Party, realized that they could stave off a social revolution in the South by presenting themselves as the non-violent liberal movement's benefactors. "Sending federal troops to Mississippi", however, was not benevolent—the FBI and the federal troops were as much or more concerned with crushing revolutionary militancy among blacks as they were with stopping the Klan. The FBI, for example, gave details in advance of the Freedom Riders' plans to local police officials, whom the FBI knew would reveal such details to the Klan.

== Integration and the transitional program ==
Radical integrationism argues that it is impossible, contra the assertions of liberal assimilationists such as Gunnar Myrdal and the early Martin Luther King Jr., for blacks to be integrated into a capitalist U.S. society. Integration, it is argued, can only be achieved in a socialist society. Revolutionary integrationism must not be confused with cultural assimilation, either. Culturally, as Randolph Bourne and James Baldwin argued, the culture of America itself must change, for genuine integration to take place. Thus leading black workers must be educated to see the fight for socialism as integral to their own struggle for emancipation, and fully integrated into the rank and file and leadership of a future U.S. Bolshevik-Leninist party. In turn, this process of racial integration must be fully integrated into the transitional demands made by socialists. Such demands as worker control of hiring, organize the South, organize unions of the unemployed, organize the unorganized, full employment through public works, armed self-defense of black neighborhoods ("block patrols") must be fully taken up by Leninists.

== Referring works ==
=== 1980s-90s ===
- Sharon Smith, "Race, class, and 'whiteness theory'" International Socialist Review Issue 46, March–April 2006, adapted from her recent work, Subterranean Fire: A * History of Working-Class Radicalism in the United States (Haymarket Books, April 2006). See also her "Mistaken identity: Or can identity politics liberate the oppressed?" International Socialism 62, March 1994.
- Mike Davis, Prisoners of the American Dream Verso, 1986, pp. 309–10
- Tom Boot, "Revolutionary Integrationism: Yesterday and Today" (1982), in Revolutionary Integration: A Marxist Analysis of African American Liberation Red Letter Press 2004.

=== 1960s ===
- James Baldwin, Nobody Knows My Name Vintage Books, 1960
- James Robertson, Shirley Stoute, 1963 SWP document, "For Black Trotskyism"
- Spartacist, "Black and Red" 1967
- "Revolutionary Integrationism: The Road to Black Freedom" by the Spartacist League, February 17, 2006
- "Capitalism and Racism", by the International Bolshevik Tendency

=== Late 1950s-early 1960s: writings and speeches of Richard S. Fraser ===
- The Negro Struggle and the Proletarian Revolution
- For the Materialist Conception of the Negro Question
- to the Discussion on the Slogan 'Send Federal Troops to Mississippi'
- Resolution on the Negro Question
- Dialectics of Black Liberation (1963), in 'Revolutionary Integration: A Marxist Analysis of African American Liberation' Red Letter Press 2004.
- On "Color Caste": Letter to James Robertson

=== 1940s-early 50s ===
- Daniel Guérin, Negroes on the March Grange or Weissman, 1956
- Oliver C. Cox, Caste, Class and Race Doubleday, 1948
- Abraham Leon "The Jewish Question: A Marxist Interpretation" originally published 1946.

=== Early 1930s ===
- Max Shachtman, Race and Revolution, Verso 2003 originally published as an internal SWP document entitled "Communism and the Negro Question" 1932–33.
- Bryan D. Palmer, "Race and Revolution", —a review of Shachtman's Race and Revolution and of Barbara Foley, Spectres of 1919: Class & Nation in the Making of the New Negro (Urbana and Chicago: University of Illinois Press, 2003)--many historical details here.

=== Other ===
- Randolph Bourne, "Transnational America"
- Sidney Finkelstein, Art and Society (1947)
- O'Reilly, Kenneth, Racial Matters": The FBI's Secret File on Black America, 1960 - 1972 (1989)
