= Edgewick, Washington =

Unincorporated community in Washington, US

- Unincorporated community
- Location in Washington and the United States Edgewick (the United States)
- Coordinates: 47°26′54″N 121°43′34″W
- Country: United States
- State: Washington
- County: King
- Elevation: 646 ft (197 m)
- Time zone: UTC-8 (Pacific (PST))
  - Summer (DST): UTC-7 (PDT)
- Area code: 360
- GNIS feature ID: 1530299

Edgewick is an unincorporated community in King County, in the U.S. state of Washington.

== History ==
A post office called Edgewick was established in 1912, and remained in operation until 1919. The community's name is an amalgamation of Vinnedge and Weeks, the names of two settlers.

The town was completely destroyed in a dam burst known locally as the "Boxley Blowout."
