= Seattle City Light =

Public electric utility in Washington state, U.S.

Agency overview
- Formed: 1905: The first municipally owned hydro facility, Cedar Falls, begins generating power for Seattle
- Type: Electric utility
- Jurisdiction: City of Seattle and some outlying communities
- Headquarters: Municipal Tower, 700 Fifth Avenue, Seattle, Washington, United States
- Employees: 1,872
- Agency executive: Dawn Lindell, General Manager and CEO
- Website: www.seattle.gov/city-light

Seattle City Light is the public utility providing electricity to Seattle, Washington, in the United States, and parts of its metropolitan area, including all of Shoreline, nearly all of Lake Forest Park, and parts of unincorporated King County, Burien, Normandy Park, SeaTac, Renton, and Tukwila. Seattle City Light is the 10th largest public utility in the United States and the first municipal utility in the US to own and operate a hydroelectric facility. In 2005, it became the first electric utility in the United States to fully offset all its carbon emissions and has remained carbon neutral every year since.

Seattle City Light is a department of the City of Seattle and is governed by the Economic Development, Technology & City Light committee of the Seattle City Council.

== Overview ==
Approximately 961,000 residents (493,663 metered customers) are served by Seattle City Light in its service area, which covers 131.31 square miles (340.1 km^{2}) in Seattle and surrounding areas. They collectively used 9,317,893 megawatt-hours of electricity in 2022; the 441,926 residential customers consumed 30.4% of the annual electricity while the 51,737 commercial and industrial customers used 44.96%. Seattle City Light was the first electric utility in the nation to become greenhouse gas neutral (2005) and has the longest-running energy conservation program in the country. The utility owns a large portion of its generation, which is predominately hydro, so is able to offer some of the country's lowest rates to its customers (of utilities in urban areas).

City Light is led by general manager and CEO Dawn Lindell, who was appointed in 2024.

== History ==
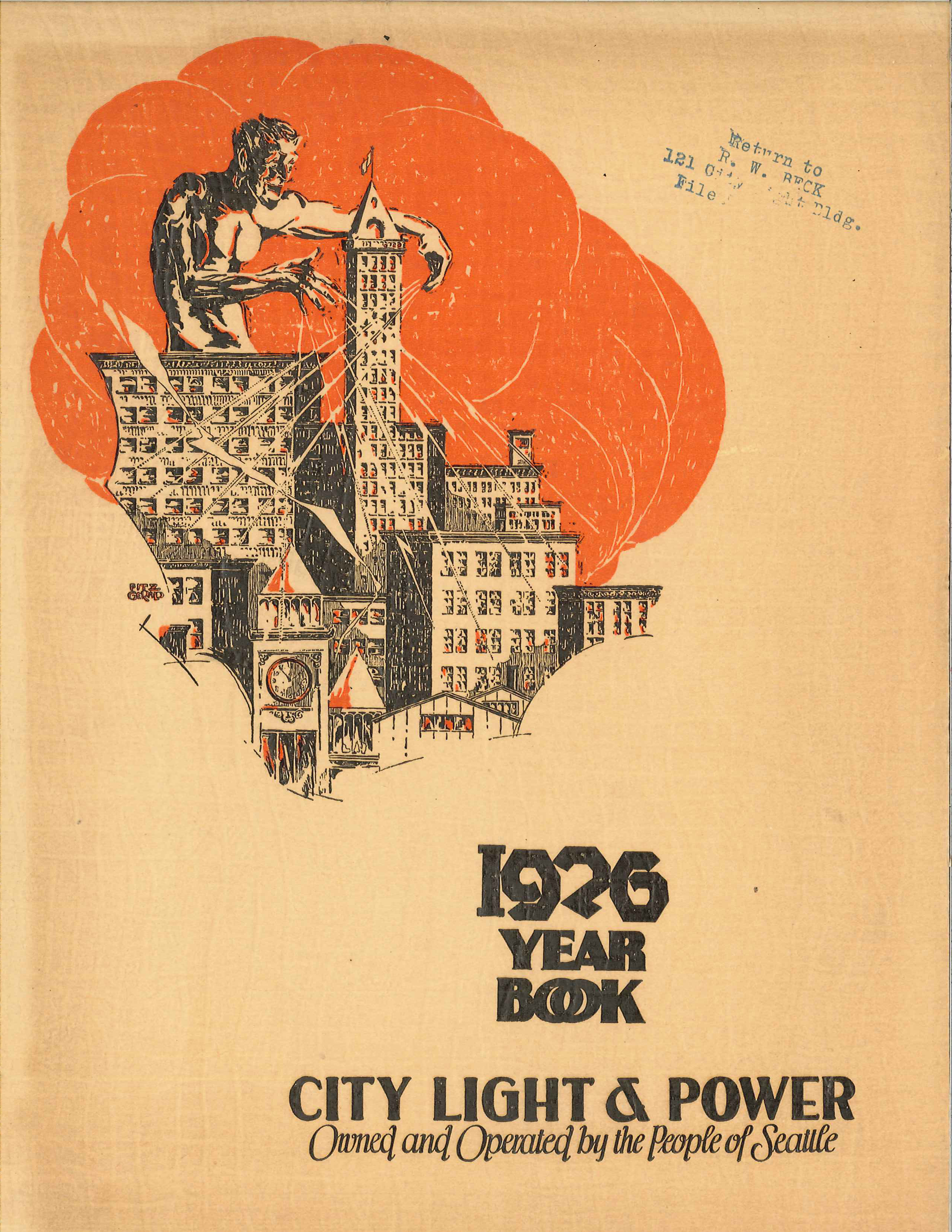
Cover of Seattle City Light Yearbook, 1926

Public responsibility for electrical energy in Seattle dates to 1890 with creation of the Department of Lighting and Water Works. In 1902, Seattle voters passed a bond issue to develop hydroelectric power on the Cedar River under the administration of the Water Department. Electricity from this development began to serve Seattle in 1905. A City Charter amendment in 1910 created the Lighting Department. Under the leadership of Superintendent James D. Ross, the department developed the Skagit River Hydroelectric Project, which began supplying power in 1924. As superintendent, Ross instituted programs to make Seattle City Light a national model for municipal ownership, such as encouraging the use of electricity for home heating, cooking, and other appliances, and directly selling appliances to customers. He staffed each branch office with an appliance salesman, and arranged for home economists to give lessons on new labor-saving devices. City Light's program of offering free appliance repair, which began in 1910, was ended by a disastrous drought in 1977 that impacted hydropower capacity.

Historical logo used prior to late 2010s

Both public and private power were supplied to Seattle until 1951 when the City purchased the private electrical power supply operations, making the Lighting Department the sole supplier. The Boundary Project in northern Washington began operation in 1967 and currently supplies over half of City Light's power generation. Approximately ten percent of City Light's income comes from the sale of surplus energy to customers in the Northwest and Southwest. The current name of the agency was adopted in 1978 when the Department was reorganized.

In 1957, City Light was one of 17 utilities to join the Washington Public Power Supply System (later named Energy Northwest), a municipal corporation, to combine resources and build facilities.

On July 20, 1992, Roberta Palm Bradley was appointed superintendent of Seattle City Light and became the first woman and first African-American to head a major municipal public utility.

In 2014, City Light completed the installation of 41,000 LED street lights along residential streets. Installation of LED streetlights on arterial streets started in 2015 and was expected to be complete by the end of 2018.

The utility's former CEO, Jorge Carrasco, entered a dispute with brand.com over search result "scrubbing" in 2014.

== Electric vehicle prototypes ==
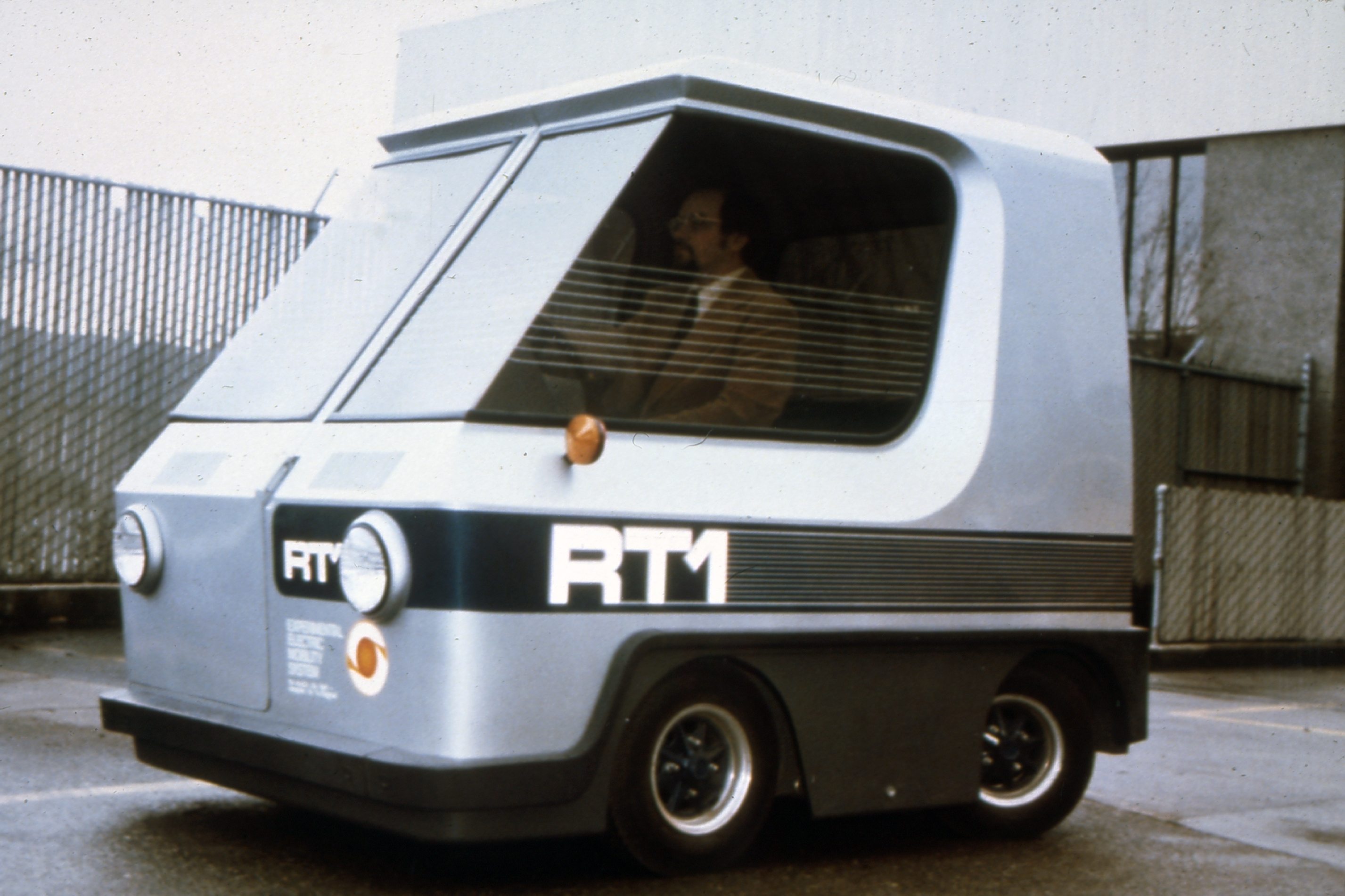
RT1 electric car prototype

In the 1960s and 1970s, Seattle City Light's research and development department developed several prototype electric vehicles. The "Electruc," from 1968, was an experimental utility truck. In 1973 the department converted an AMC Gremlin to run on electric power. The RT1, developed in 1976, was a city car intended for use in downtown Seattle in a zone where most internal combustion engine-powered vehicles would be banned. The RT1 was intended to have a top speed of 30 miles per hour (48 km/h), a range of 75 miles (121 km) on eight 6-volt batteries, and seating for four passengers. It never entered production.

== Seattle's electricity supply ==
The 2016 official fuel mix statistics by the state of Washington for Seattle City Light show approximately 88% hydroelectric, 5% nuclear, 4% wind, 1% coal, 1% natural gas, 1% biogas. City Light's portfolio of energy sources includes electricity purchased through long-term contracts with the Bonneville Power Administration (BPA). The remaining power comes from a mixture of sources.

Due to the reliance on hydroelectricity, itself dependent on consistent snowpack and melting seasons, City Light occasionally purchases supplemental power using its emergency funds.

Seattle City Light residential customers pay about 14 cents per kilowatt-hour of electricity, as of 2025. Seattle has the lowest residential and commercial electrical rates among comparably-sized cities in the United States.

=== Owned facilities ===
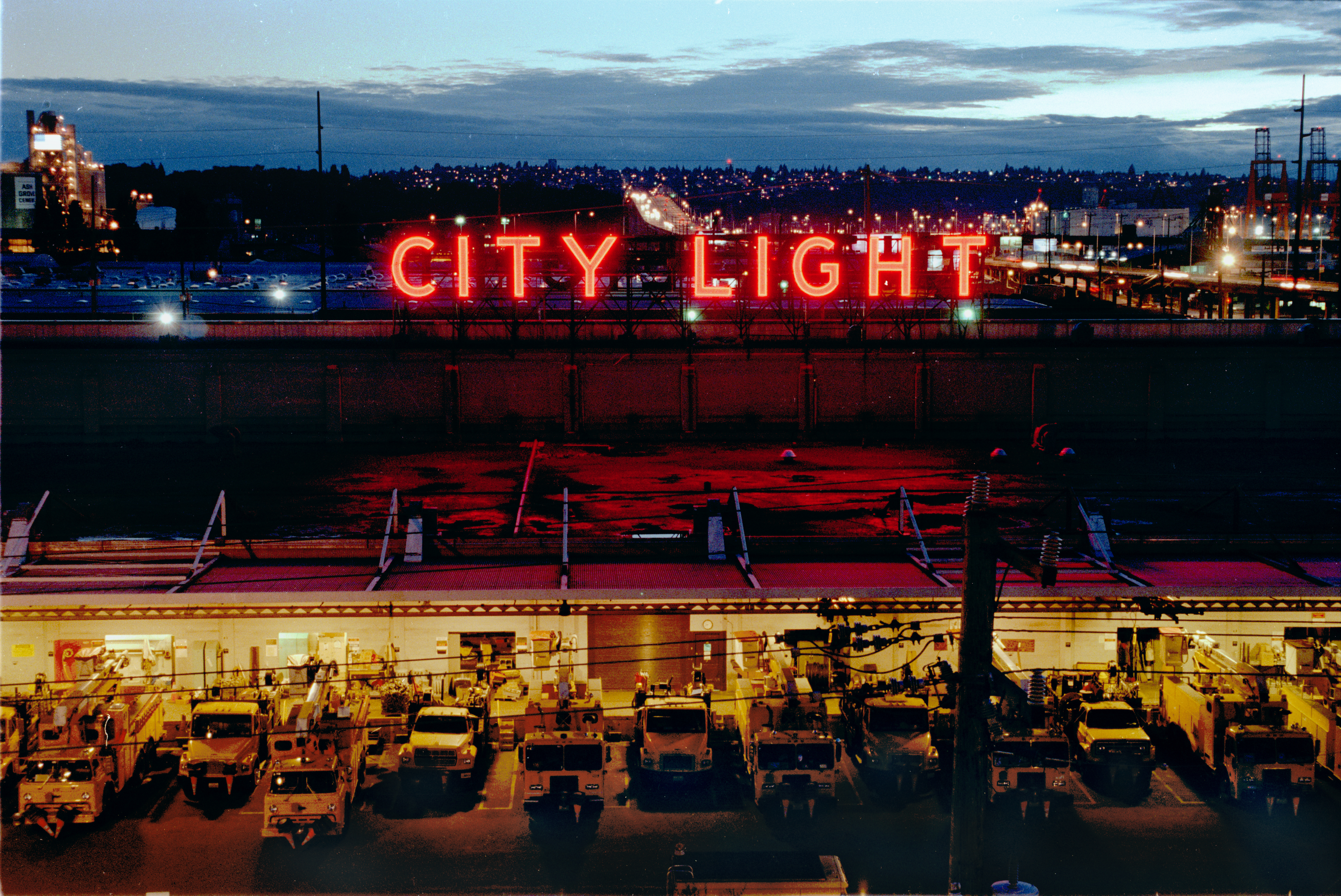
Seattle City Light south service center, 1998

The utility owns and operates a total of six hydro facilities:

- The Skagit River Hydroelectric Project, a series of three hydroelectric dams (Gorge, Diablo, and Ross) on the Skagit River in northern Washington State. The project supplies approximately 25 percent of Seattle's electric power.
- The Boundary Dam on the Pend Oreille River in northeastern Washington State
- Cedar Falls Dam, about 35 miles southeast of Seattle
- South Fork of the Tolt

No longer operating:

- Newhalem Creek Hydroelectric Project

== Conservation efforts ==
Seattle's Energy 1990 plan bound City Light to meet load growth through conservation efforts as well as increased power generation. City Light encouraged customers to wrap water heaters, insulate attics, adjust thermostats, and weatherize windows and doors. Over 20 years, conservation efforts reduced use by 6.5 million megawatt-hours and customers' bills by $215 million.

City Light implemented programs in the 1990s to mitigate the impact of the Skagit dams on salmon runs. Modifying water regulation to ensure that salmon nests remained under water resulted in a loss equivalent to more than $45 million in potential power over 30 years, yet dramatically increased the number of salmon returning to the Skagit River. Conservation efforts expanded in 2000, with increased emphasis on protecting salmon and other species and to develop renewable energy sources.

City Light became the first utility in the United States to reach net-zero greenhouse gas emissions in 2005.

== Lawsuits and labor disputes ==
Acceptance letter into the ETT program

During the late 1960s, City Light instituted affirmative action programs designed to integrate men of color, mostly Black men, into the electrical trades field. These programs failed and resulted in a series of racial discrimination lawsuits against the utility.

In 1972 Gordon Vickery, the former chief of the Seattle Fire Department, was appointed as the superintendent of City Light by Seattle mayor Wes Uhlman. At the time, Vickery had been exploring the possibility of running for mayor, and his appointment was a calculated political move by Uhlman in an attempt to forge an alliance with him and prevent a future electoral challenge. In his role as superintendent, Vickery was tasked with reducing City Light's budget through wage cuts and work speed-ups, which proved deeply unpopular with employees. In addition, Vickery helped craft a successful affirmative action program for women to use as experience that would position himself as a progressive in future electoral ventures.

In 1973, policy changes instituted by Vickery, seen by many as draconian, prompted electricians and office workers to stage a work stoppage for 11 days in April 1974 in protest. In 1975, a 98 day strike by electricians represented by the IBEW local 77 became the longest public employee strike in the history of the state. During the strike, supervisors and managers stepped in and were able to keep the system functional, although routine maintenance and new connections stopped. As City Light was unable to be shut down and local 77 failed to gain support of the broader union, the electricians were forced to settle for a contract with worse working conditions.

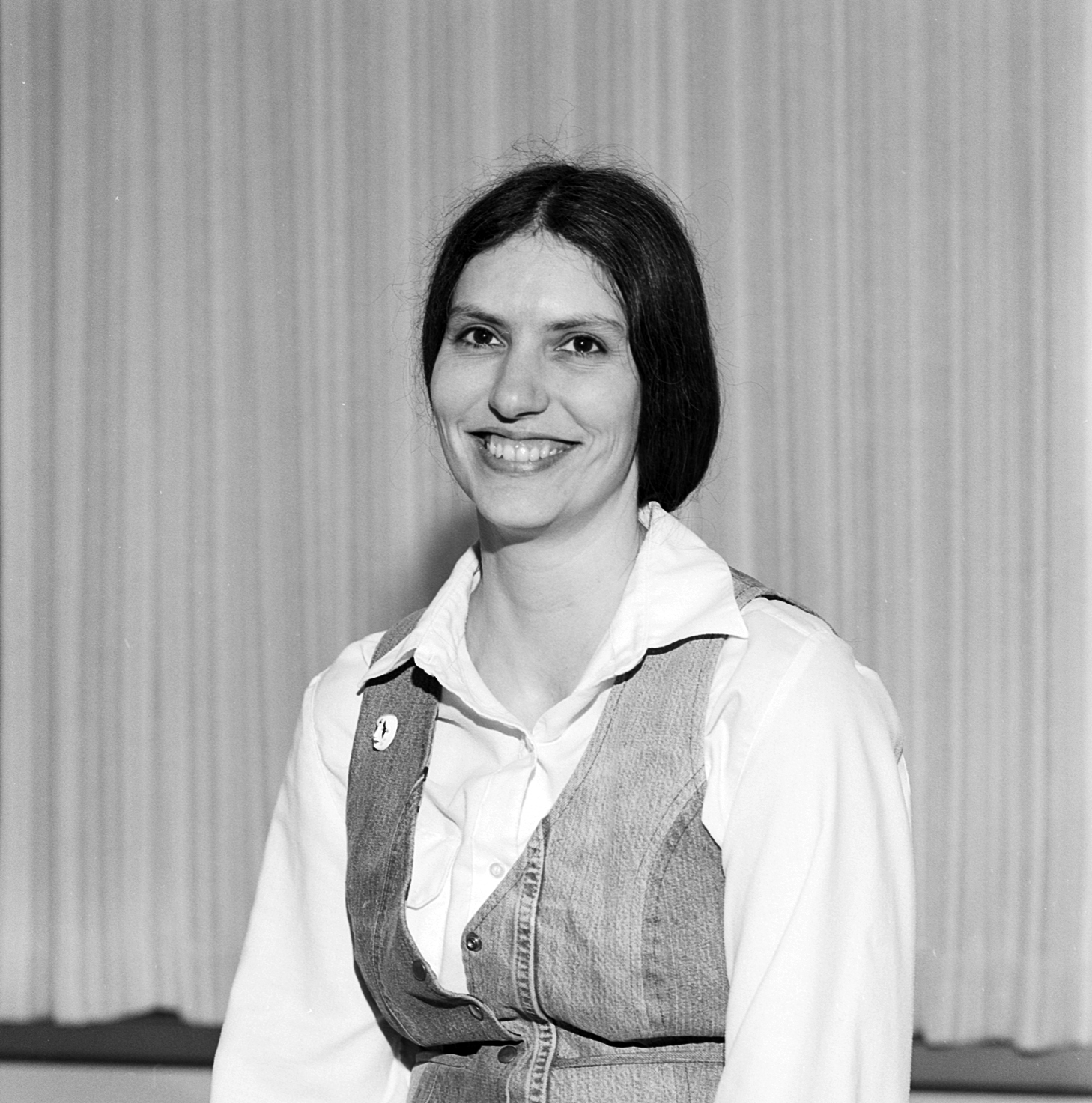
Megan Cornish (c. 1974), one of the first female electricians in the country, as an apprentice at City Light

In 1973 City Light hired Clara Fraser, a socialist feminist activist, as a training and education coordinator tasked with redesigning an affirmative action program to integrate women into the electrical trades. Fraser created an all-female electrical trades trainee (ETT) program in which the women were to be given two weeks of physical and classroom instruction and allowed membership, as well as their own bargaining unit, in the IBEW local 77 as soon as they began. Fraser used her connections to the feminist community to recruit women for the program, resulting in over 300 applications for 10 positions. The training was cancelled, however, only a week after it began, and the trainees were told to report for field work the next week. Fraser was laid off in July 1975. The ETT program was officially terminated in September 1975, and eight of the ten female trainees were laid off. These actions by Vickery and City Light management were widely seen as retaliation against Fraser for her participation in the 1974 walkout.

After the cancellation of training, nine of the female ETT's filed a discrimination complaint with the City of Seattle Office of Women's Rights, stating they were being denied the same amount of training and pay given to male employees, and their terminations were later added. In July 1976, City Light was ordered by a court to reinstate six of the eight terminated women, pay them damage fees, and make them eligible for apprenticeship programs.

Following her termination, Fraser filed a lawsuit against Seattle City Light, alleging discrimination on the basis of sex and political ideology. After a seven year legal battle, a court ruled in favor of Fraser, ordering her reinstatement and payment in damages.

In 1983, the Employee Committee for Equal Rights at City Light (CERCL) was established by a group of women employees and employees of color to fight discrimination and harassment in the workplace. CERCL membership grew rapidly over the course of the 1980s and pressured the Seattle Human Rights Department to investigate discrimination cases that had previously been met with inaction.

In 2025, it was reported that 40 employees were investigated for 259 misconduct allegations "including drinking on the job, sexual harassment, and retaliation". Five employees resigned or were fired, while the city "suspended seven, issued warnings to nine, and provided coaching and training to 13 others."

== Art commissions ==
Seattle City Light commissioned what became known as the 60-panel series, Evolution of Lighting, which portrayed "the story of light, from prehistoric to modern times". Most of the 3 ft × 2 ft (0.91 m × 0.61 m) panels, made of Britannia metal using repoussé technique, were completed in 1935. Thirty four of the works were created by Albert E. Booth and artist John W. Elliott. Two additional panels by Elliott were added in 1958; the entire work was then recomposed into a single display. The series remained on view in the lobby at the Third Avenue and Madison Street headquarters until the artwork was noticed to be missing by 1996. An investigation in 2025, led by the Seattle Times and Elliot's granddaughter, led to a timeline of the lost work. Several panels were placed in employee-only hallways after staff moved to the Seattle Municipal Tower in 1996. A single panel was relocated next to a restroom in a staff-only area that same year at the agency's North Service Center. During a remodel at the Municipal Tower location, the panels were most likely removed and the following year, 28 of the pieces were sold as surplus for $10 each under the need to "reduce belongings". The remaining panels are thought to have also been sold in a similar manner though the utility company does not have records to support the conclusion. With the exception of two missing panels, the Evolution of Lighting series that was relocated to the Seattle Municipal Tower have been found; as of 2025, an antique dealer from West Seattle had purchased 33 of the 36 panels with hopes to once again display the series.

Seattle City Light began commissioning decorative designs for its manhole covers in the 1970s after suggestions from Jacquetta Blanchett Freeman, a member of the Seattle Arts Commission. A set of 19 manhole covers with relief maps of Downtown Seattle were designed by city employee Anne Knight and installed beginning in April 1977 to aid with wayfinding. Knight's covers use raised symbols to represent local landmarks, including the now-demolished Kingdome, that are labeled with a key on the outer ring of the manhole. Other commissioned designs include portraits of city figures, a Tlingit-styled whale, and Northwestern flowers. As of 2012, there are 115 manhole covers in Seattle with decorative designs.

In 2012, the Seattle City Light Conservation Program hired Adam Frank to produce a large scale installation that featured the City of Seattle's hydroelectric power sources. This work of light was a projected living map of Seattle's hydroelectric generation and electricity use.
