= Amphibians and reptiles of Mount Rainier National Park =

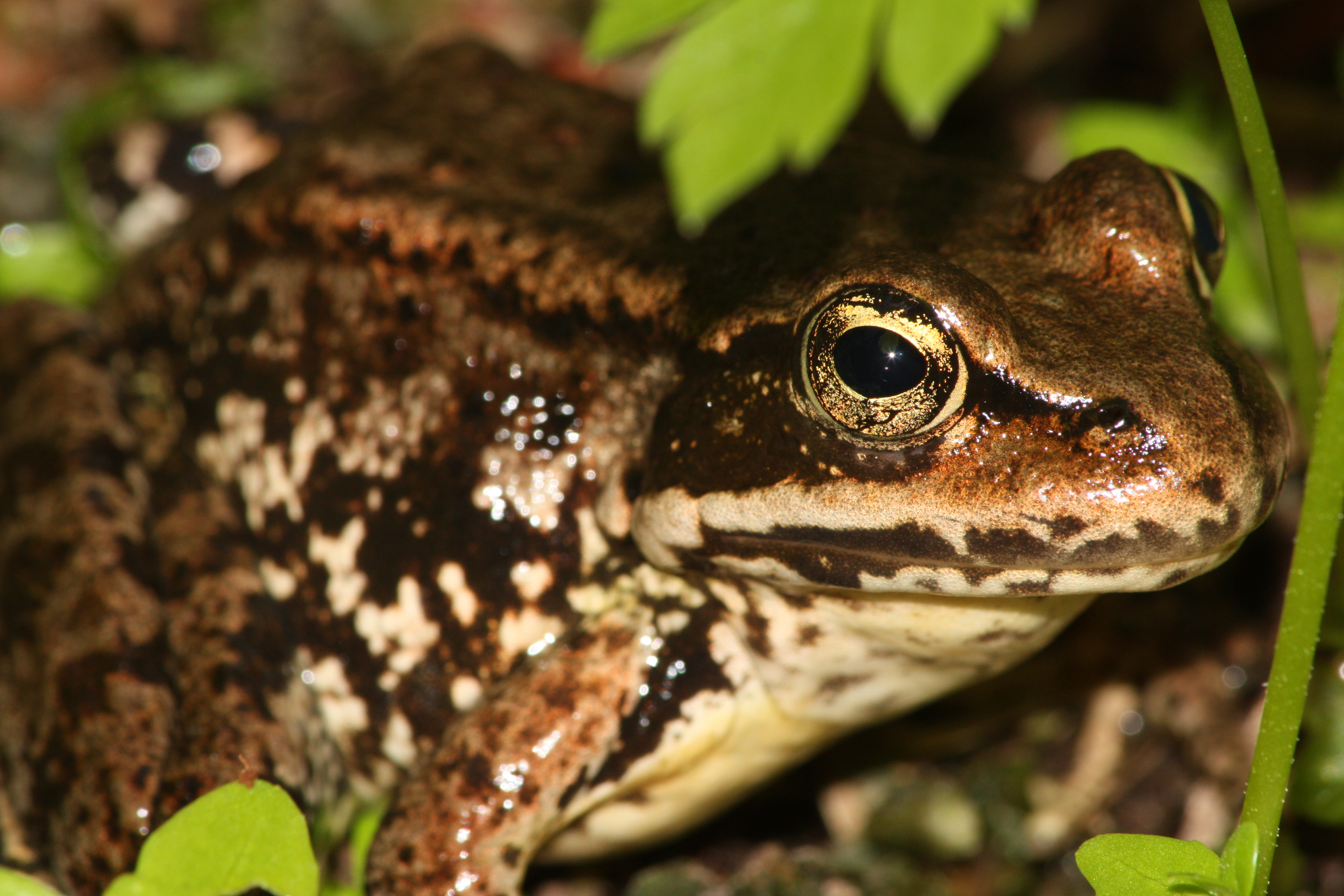
Cascades Frog

There are 14 species of amphibians and 5 species of reptiles known to occur in Mount Rainier National Park.

== Amphibians ==
- Family: Newts Salamandridae
  - Rough-skinned newt (Taricha granulosa) is a North American newt known for its strong poison. Habitats of rough-skinned newts are found throughout the West Coast of the United States and British Columbia. Their range extends south to Santa Cruz, California and north to Alaska. They are uncommon east of the Cascade Mountains though occasionally found (and considered exotic, and possibly artificially introduced) as far as Montana. One isolated population lives in several ponds just north of Moscow, Idaho and were most likely introduced.
- Family: Mole Salamanders Ambystomatidae
  - Northwestern Salamander (Ambystoma gracile) inhabits the northwest Pacific coast of North America. These fairly large salamanders grow to 8.7 inches (220 mm) in length. It is found from southeastern Alaska on May Island, through Washington and Oregon south to the mouth of the Gulala River, Sonoma County, California. It occurs from sea level to timberline, but not east of the Cascade Divide.
  - Long-toed salamander (Ambystoma macrodactylum, Baird 1849) is a mole salamander. It is an ecologically versatile species living in a variety of habitats, ranging from temperate rainforests, coniferous forests, montane riparian, sagebrush plains, red fir forest, semi-arid sagebrush, cheatgrass plains, to alpine meadows along the rocky shores of mountain lakes. Adults can be located in forested understory, hiding under coarse woody debris, rocks, and in small mammal burrows. During the spring breeding season adults can be found under debris or the shoreline shallows of rivers, streams, lakes, and ponds. Ephemeral waters are often frequented.
- Family: Pacific Giant Salamanders Dicamptodontidae
  - Coastal Giant Salamander (Dicamptodon tenebrosus) is a species of Pacific giant salamanders. Its natural habitats are temperate forests, rivers, freshwater lakes, and freshwater marshes. The Coastal Giant Salamander is endemic to the Pacific Northwest, found in Northern California, Oregon, Washington, and southern British Columbia.
  - Cope's Giant Salamander (Dicamptodon copei) is a species of Pacific Giant Salamanders. It is endemic to the Pacific Northwestern portion of the United States. It is found on the Olympic Peninsula, Washington. Its natural habitat is temperate forests, rivers, freshwater lakes, and freshwater marshes. It is threatened by habitat loss and human population expansion.
- Family: Lungless Salamanders Plethodontidae
  - Ensatina (Ensatina eschscholtzii) is a complex of plethodontid (lungless) salamanders. found in coniferous forests, oak woodland and chaparral from British Columbia, through Washington, Oregon, across California (where all seven subspecies variations are located), all the way down to Baja California in Mexico.
  - Larch Mountain Salamander (Plethodon larselli) is a species of salamander in the family Plethodontidae. It is endemic to the United States. The Larch Mountain salamander occurs in the Cascade Mountains of southern Washington and northern Oregon. In Washington, it occurs from the Columbia River Gorge to just north of Snoqualmie Pass. Its natural habitats are temperate forests and rocky areas.
  - Van Dyke's Salamander (Plethodon vandykei) is a salamander in the order Caudata and the family Plethodontidae. Like most terrestrial salamanders Van Dyke's Salamander lives near lakes, rivers, and streams under various objects such as rocks, logs, and bark. Salamanders' habitat range from wide open lowlands up to heavily wooded mountains. It is in this wood that they lay their eggs. The species is endemic to the western portion of the state of Washington, northern Idaho, and northwestern Montana in the U.S. It is predominantly located in hilly or mountainous regions such as the Olympic Hills, the Willapa Hills and the Cascade Mountains.
  - Western Redback Salamander (Plethodon vehiculum) is a species of salamander in the family Plethodontidae. It is found in Canada and the United States. Its natural habitats are temperate forests and rocky areas. Colored stripe on back changes from red to yellow.
- Family: Tailed Frogs Ascaphidae
  - Rocky Mountain tailed frog (Ascaphus montanus)
- Family: True Toads Bufonidae
  - Western Toad (Anaxyrus boreas) more commonly known as Bufo boreas (both names accurate) is a large toad species, between 5.6 and 13 cm long, of western North America. The range of western toad extends from western British Columbia and southern Alaska south through Washington, Oregon, and Idaho to northern Baja California, Mexico; east to Montana, western and central Wyoming, Nevada, the mountains and higher plateaus of Utah, and western Colorado. In the Pacific Northwest, the western toad occurs in mountain meadows and less commonly in Douglas-fir forests.
- Family: Tree Frogs Hylidae
  - Pacific Tree Frog (Pseudacris regilla) has a range from the West Coast of the United States (from Northern California, Oregon, and Washington) to British Columbia, in Canada. They live from sea level to more than 10,000 feet in many types of habitats, reproducing in aquatic settings. They are the only frogs that go "ribbit". They come in shades of greens or browns and can change colors over periods of hours and weeks.
- Family: True Frogs Ranidae
  - Cascades Frog (Rana cascadae) is a species of frog in the family Ranidae that is found in western United States and possibly Canada, mainly in the Cascade Range and Olympic Mountains. The Cascade frog was first discovered in the Cascade Mountains in the California regions. It can be found throughout the Cascade Mountains ranging from Washington through Oregon, and California. They concentrate heavily around the volcanic area of the peaks. Its natural habitats are temperate forests, temperate grassland, rivers, swamps, freshwater lakes, intermittent freshwater lakes, freshwater marshes generally between 665 m (2,180 ft) and 2,450 m (8,040 ft) elevation. The range may extend lower in Washington.
  - Northern red-legged frog (Rana aurora) is a species of amphibian, whose range is the coastal region stretching from southwest British Columbia to Northern California, and is protected in British Columbia, Oregon and California. As a member of the genus Rana, this species is considered a true frog, with characteristic smooth skin and a narrow waist. This frog requires still waters for breeding, and is rarely found at any great distance from its breeding ponds or marshes.
Amphibians of Mount Rainier National Park
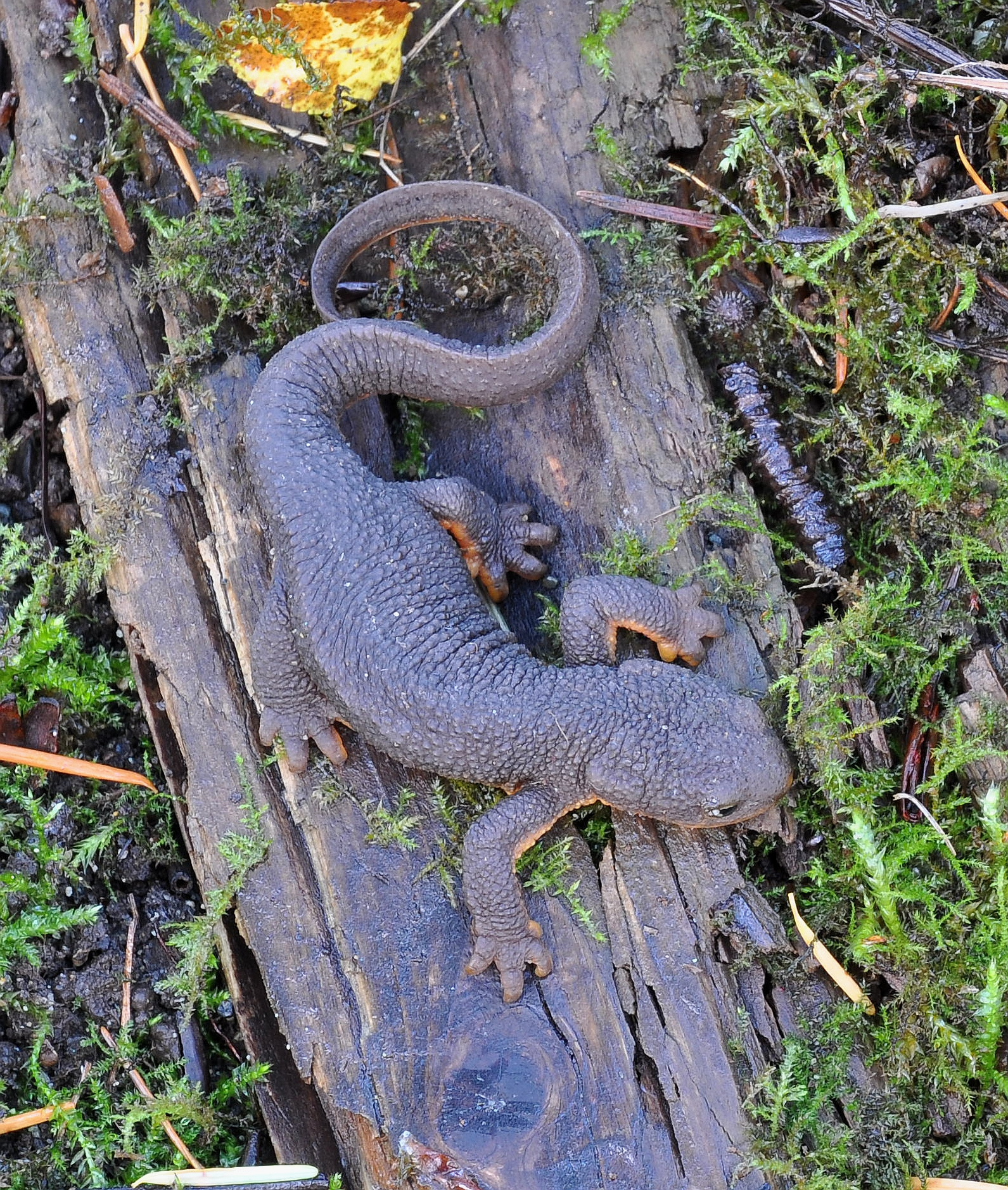
Rough-skinned newt

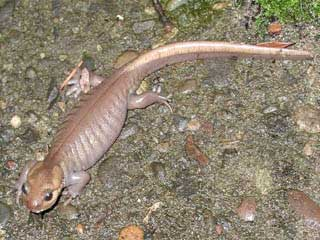
Northwestern Salamander

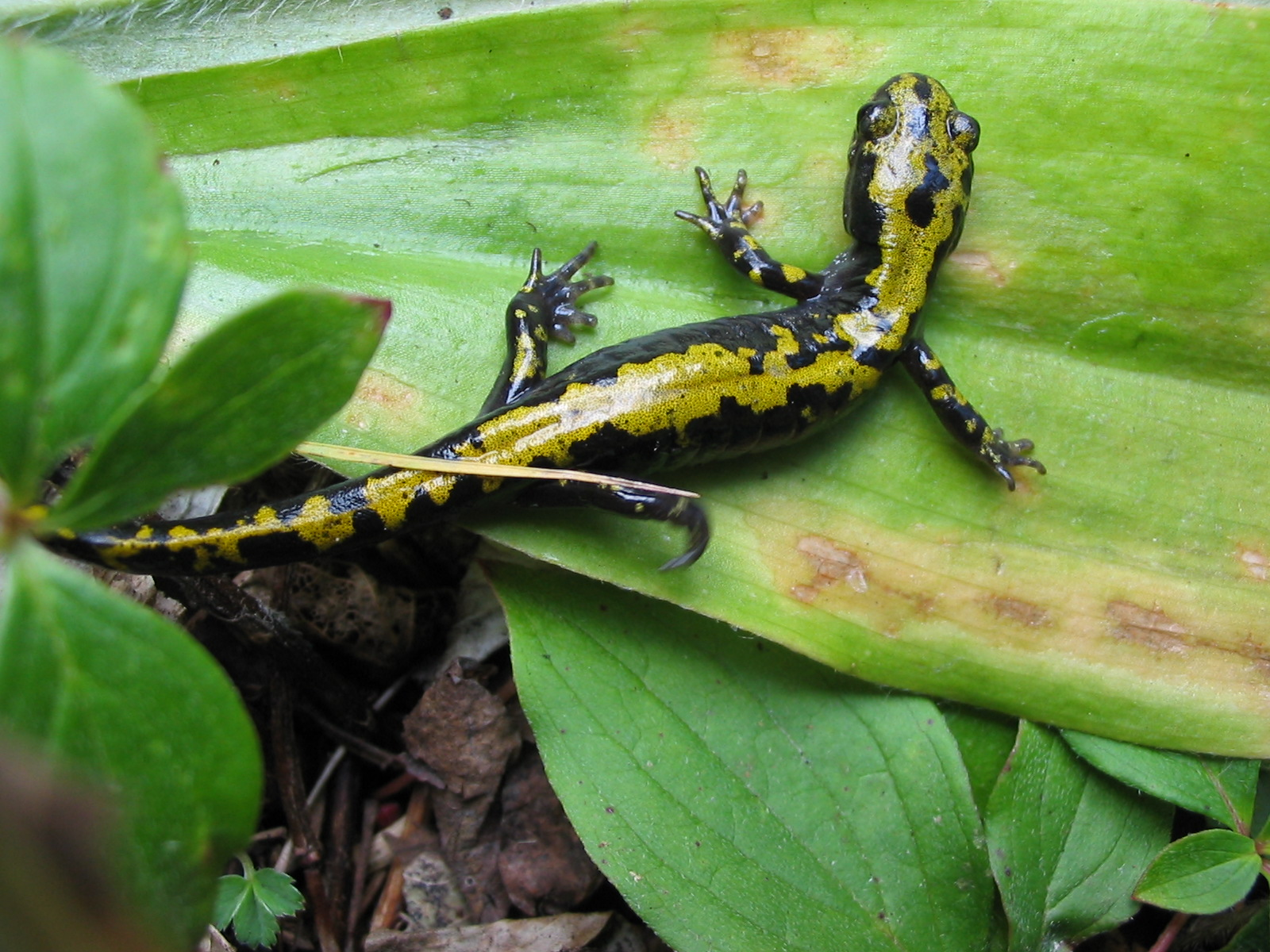
Long-toed Salamander

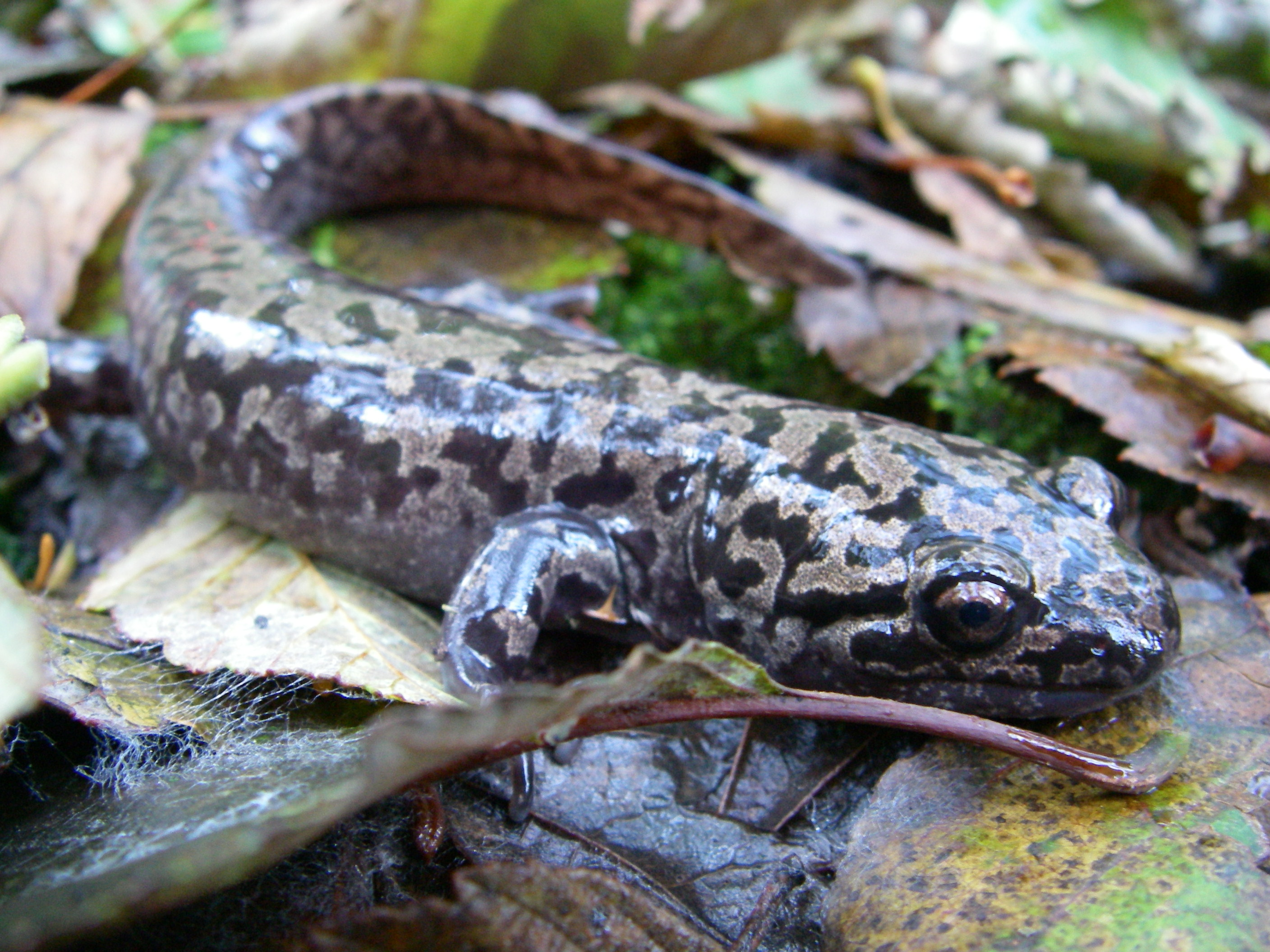
Coastal Giant Salamander

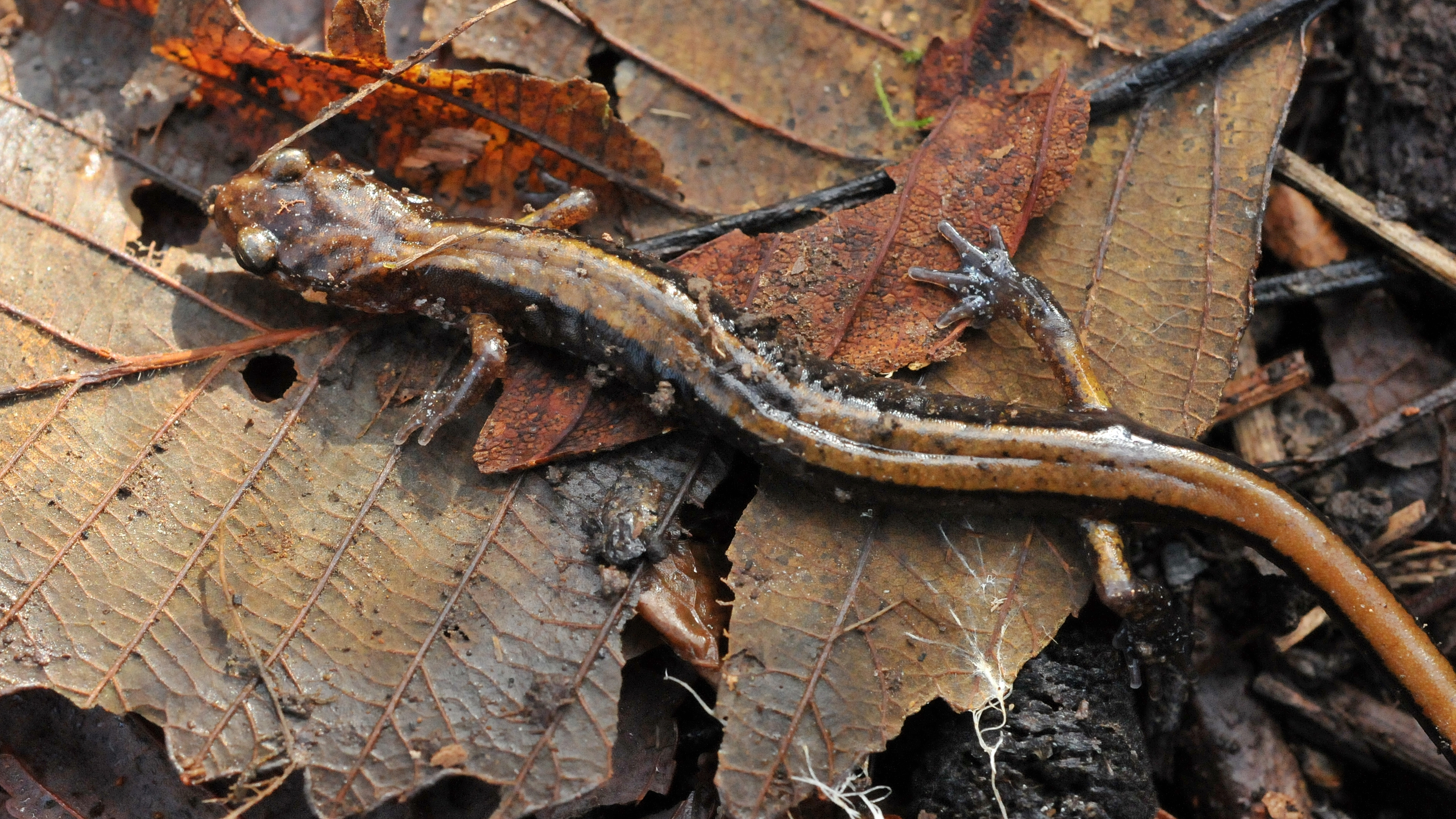
Western Redback Salamander

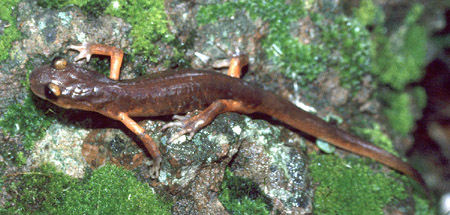
Ensatina

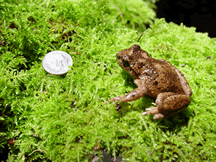
Tailed Frog

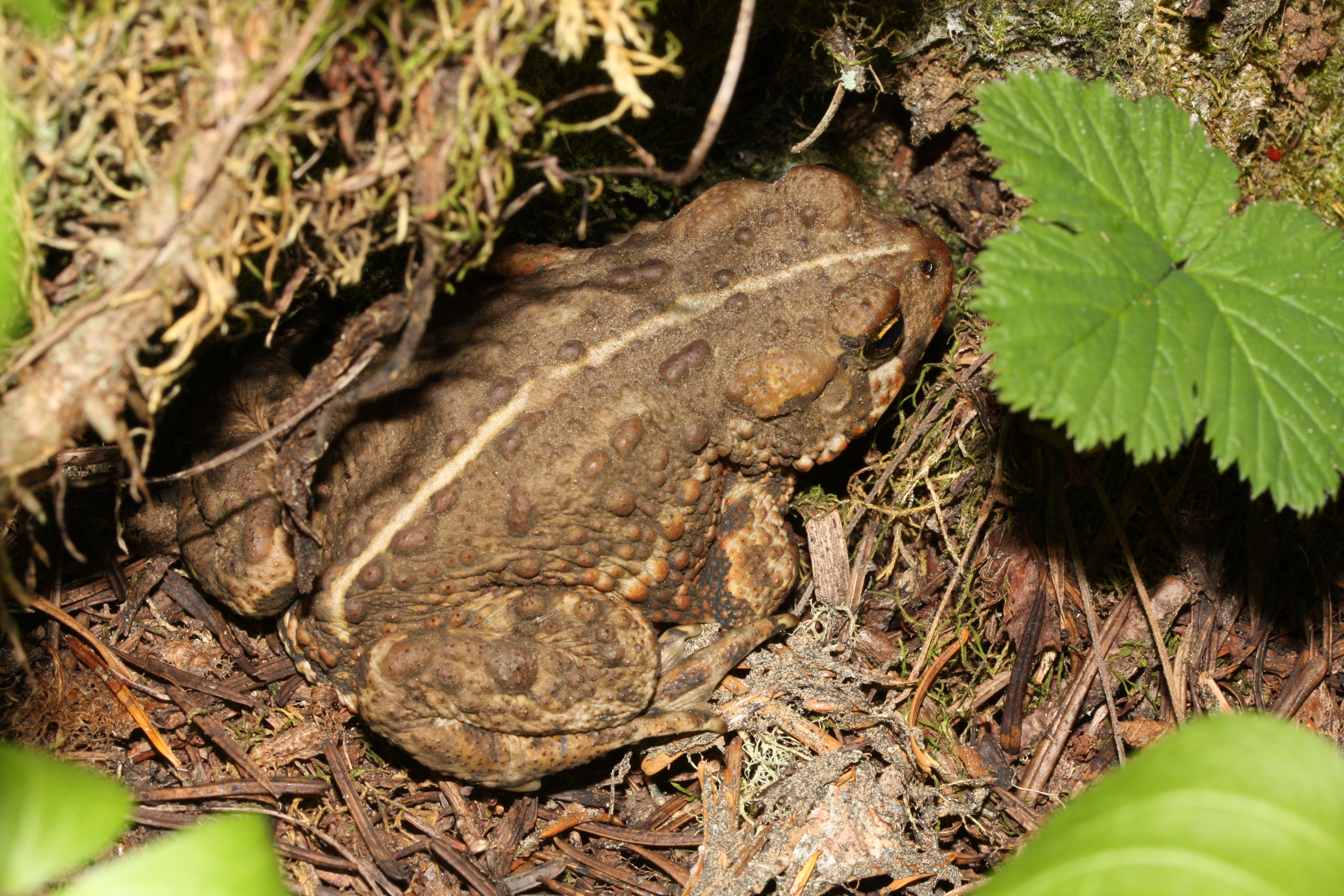
Western Toad

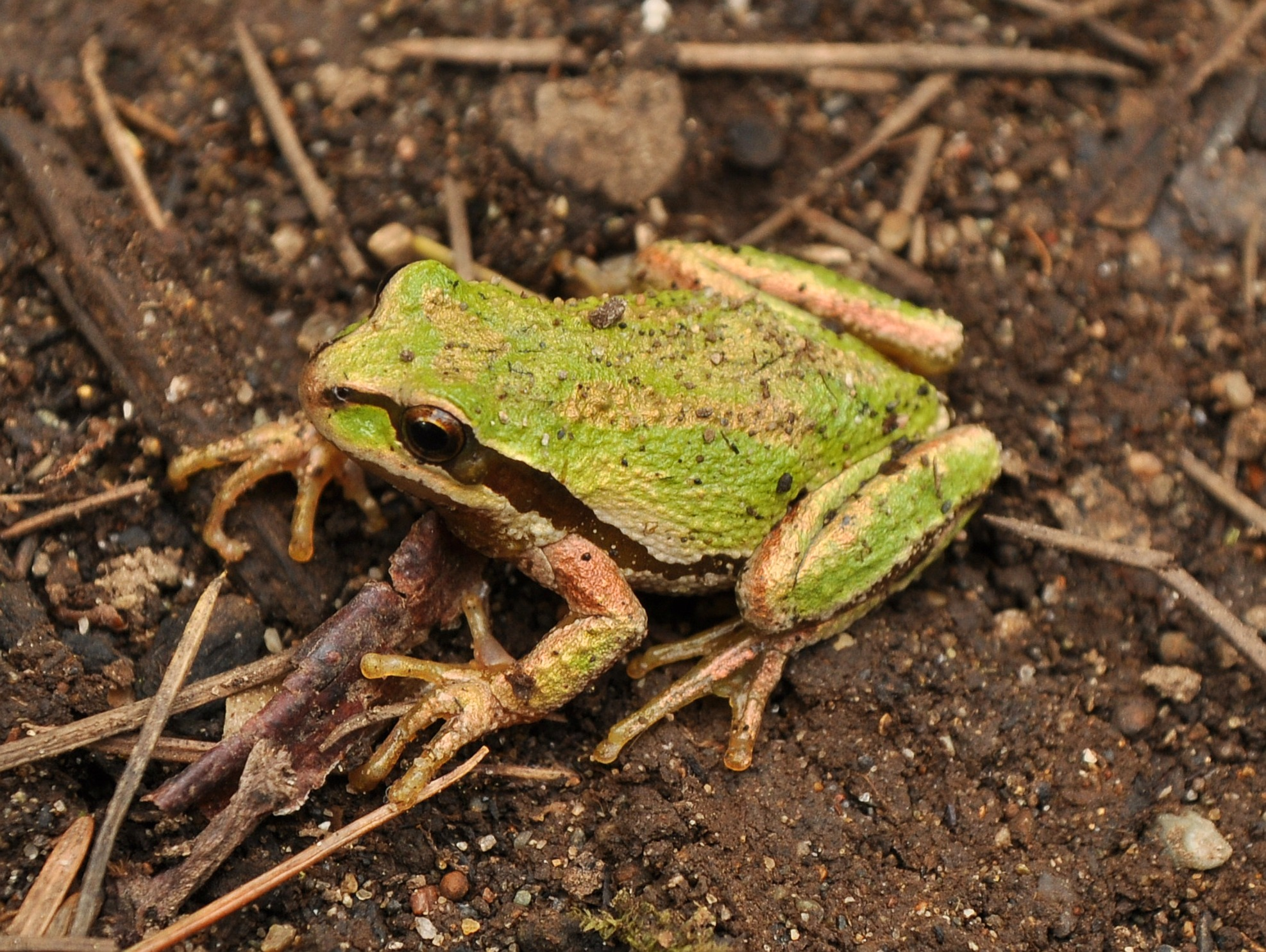
Pacific Tree Frog

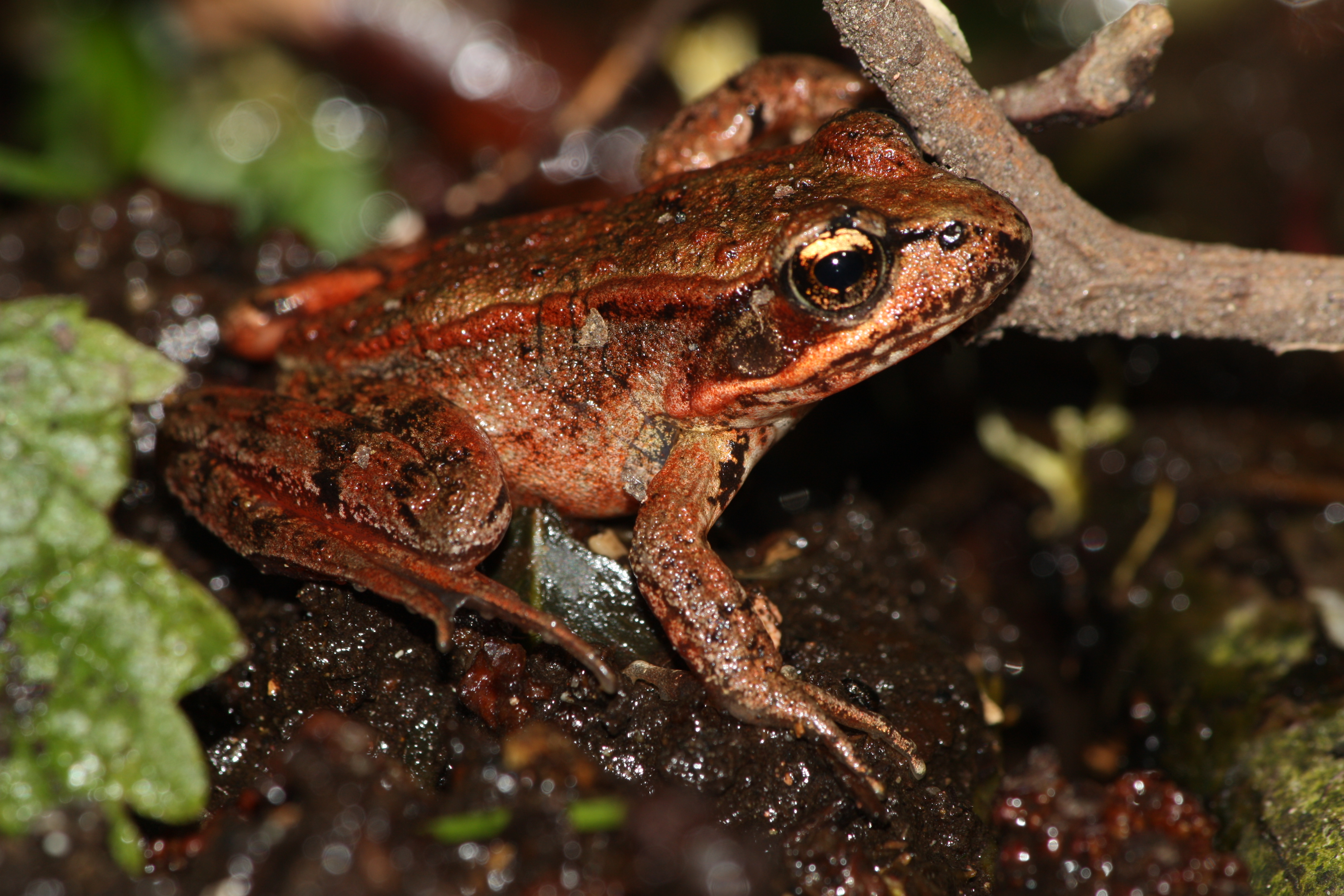
Northern Red-legged Frog

== Reptiles ==
- Family: Lizards Anguidae
  - Northern Alligator Lizard (Elgaria coerulea) is a medium-sized lizard that occurs along the Pacific Coast and in the Rocky Mountains from southern British Columbia through Washington, northern Idaho and western Montana south through Oregon to the coastal range and the Sierra Nevada in central California. The species is widely distributed along the Pacific coast and can be found from sea level up to elevation of about 3,350 m (10,990 ft). It is found in a variety of forested habitats and montane chaparral.
- Family: Boas Boidae
  - Rubber Boa (Charina bottae) are the most northerly of boa species. The distribution of Rubber Boas covers a large portion of the western United States, stretching from the Pacific Coast east to western Utah and Montana, as far south as the San Bernardino and San Jacinto Mountains east of Los Angeles in California, and as far north as southern British Columbia. Rubber Boas have been known to inhabit a wide variety of habitat types from grassland, meadows and chaparral to deciduous and conifer forests, to high alpine settings. They can be found at elevations anywhere from sea level to over 10,000 feet (3,000 m).
- Family: Garter Snakes Colubridae
  - Northwestern garter snake, (Thamnophis ordinoides), is a species of colubrid snake endemic to North America. In the United States it is found in Oregon, Washington, and California; in Canada it is found in British Columbia. It is the most common snake in the park. The northwestern garter snake is small, with adults averaging around 36–53 cm (14–21 in) in total length. It is most commonly found on the edge of meadows, surrounded by forest.
  - Wandering Garter Snake (Thamnophis elegans vagrans) is a subspecies of the Western Terrestrial Garter Snake, a species of colubrid snake residing only in Southwestern Canada, and Western United States. Seven subspecies are currently recognized. Most snakes have a yellow, light orange, or white dorsal stripe, accompanied by two stripes on its side of the same color. Some varieties have red or black spots between the dorsal stripe and the side stripes. This snake often inhabits coniferous forests, and is relatively aquatic.
  - Valley Garter Snake (Thamnophis sirtalis fitchi) is a subspecies of the common garter snake. It is a snake indigenous to North America. Most garter snakes have a pattern of yellow stripes on a brown background and their average length is about 1 to 1.5 metres (3.3 to 4.9 ft). The common garter snake is a diurnal snake. In summer, it is most active in the morning and late afternoon; in cooler seasons or climates, it restricts its activity to the warm afternoons.

Reptiles of Mount Rainier National Park
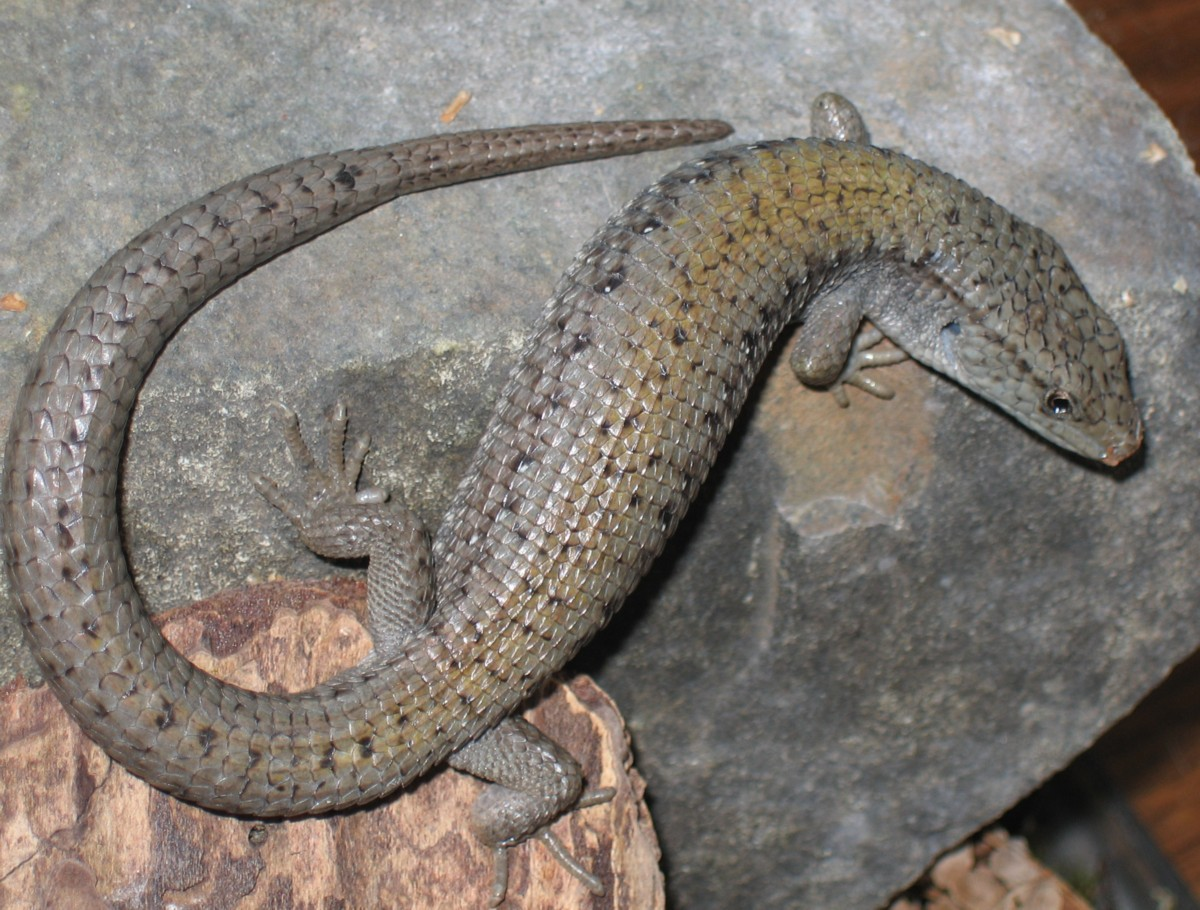
Northern Alligator Lizard

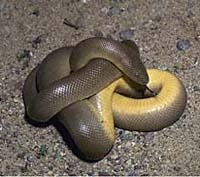
Rubber Boa

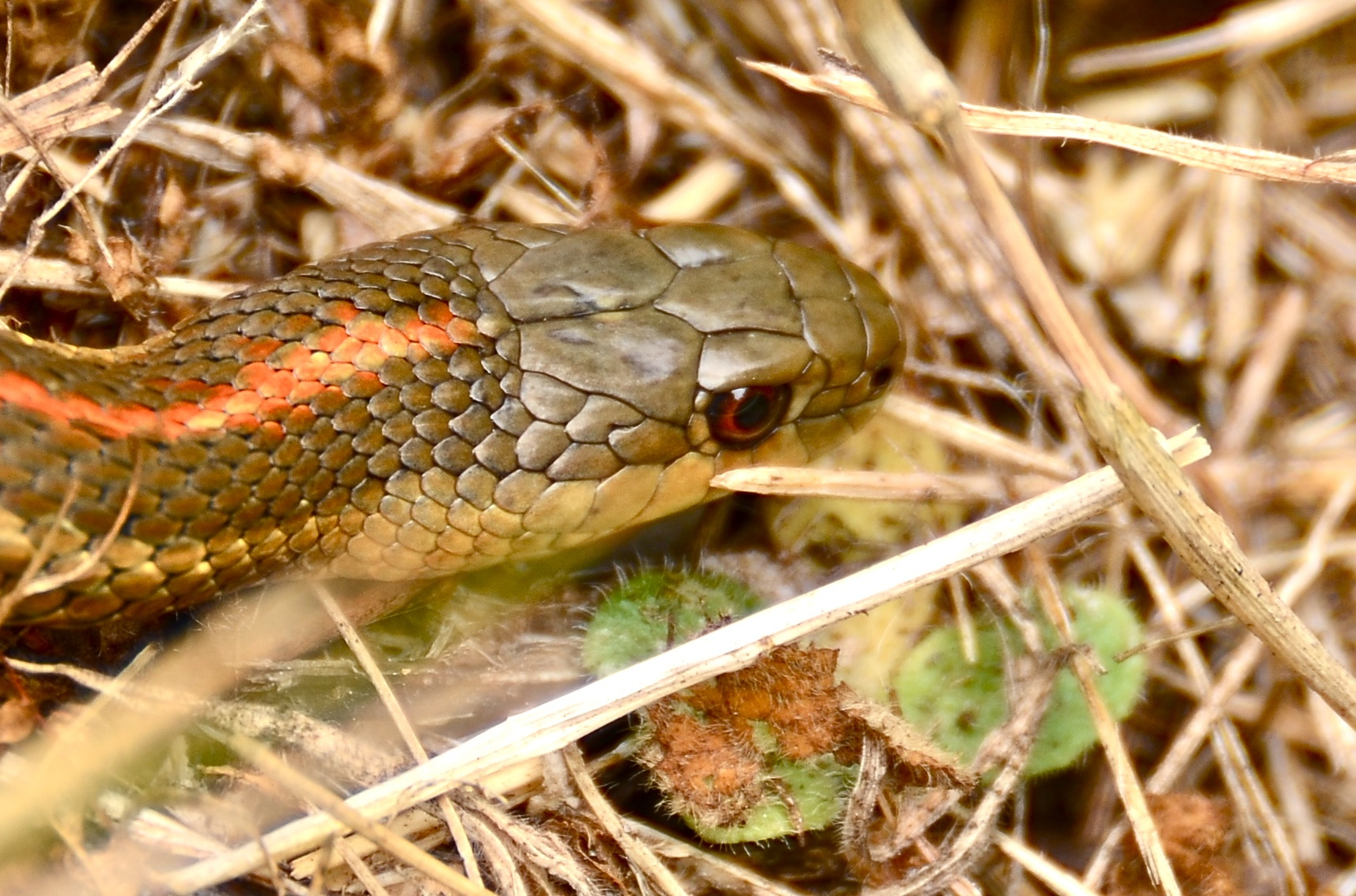
Northwestern Garter Snake

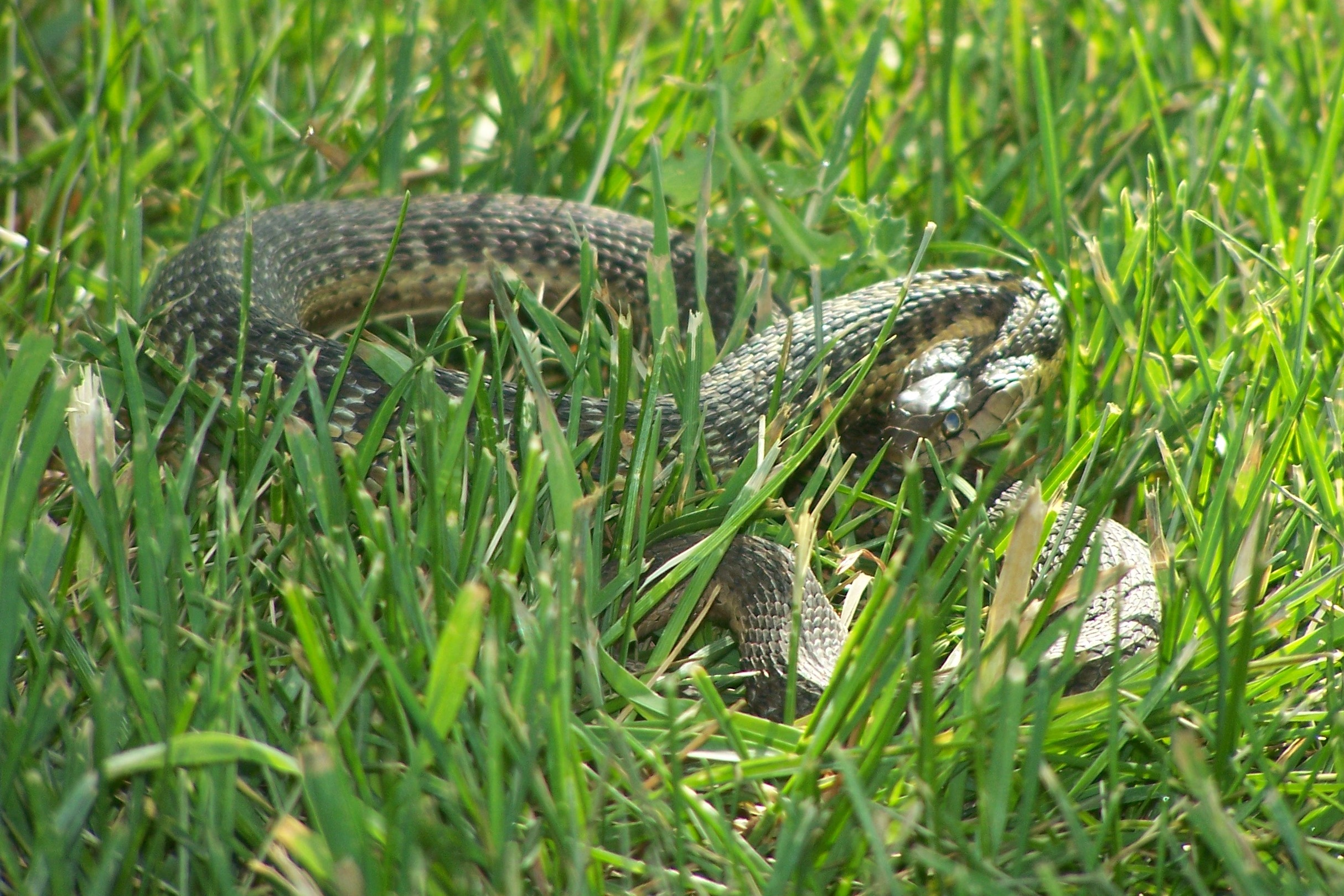
Wandering Garter Snake

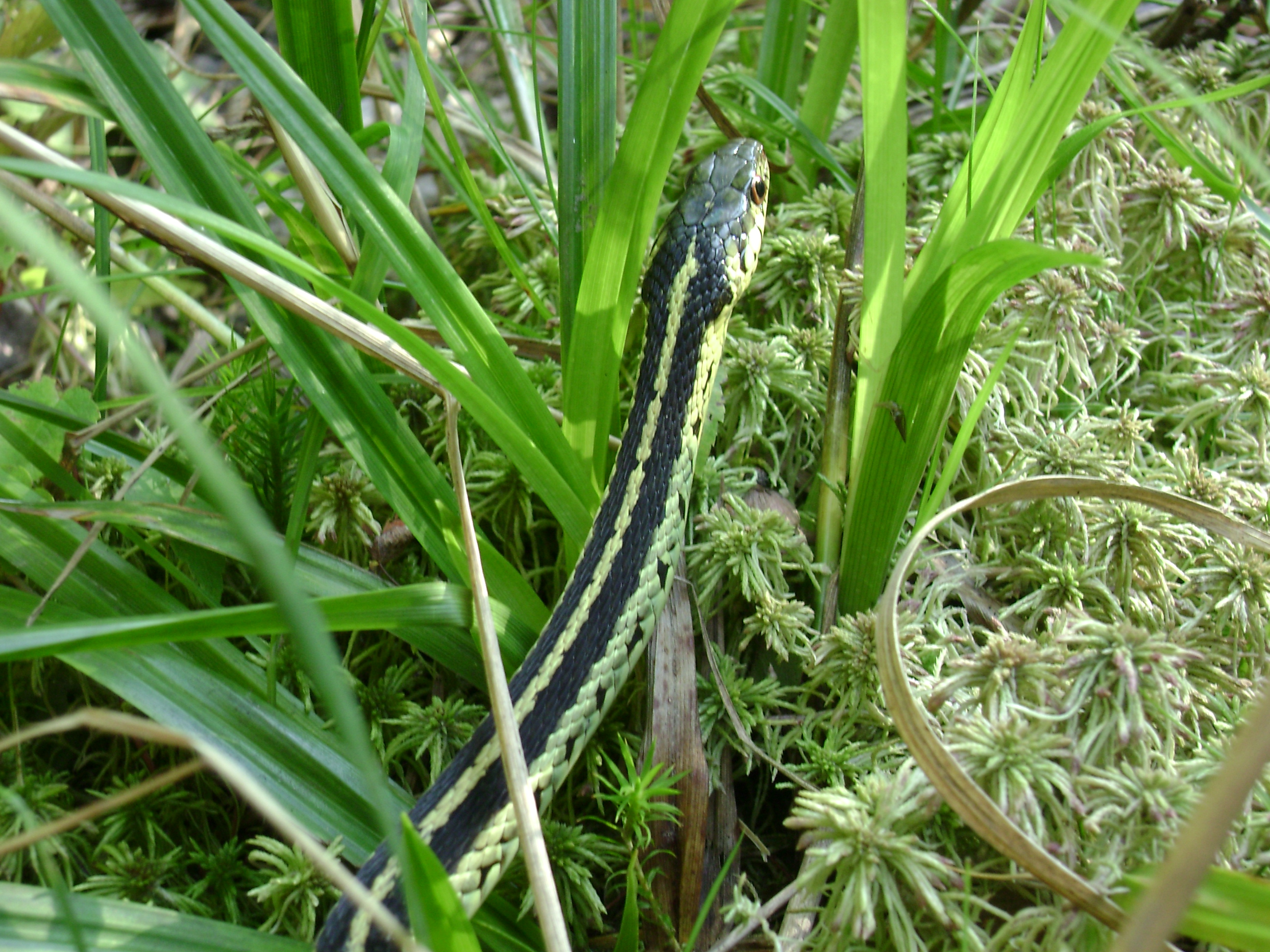
Valley Garter Snake
