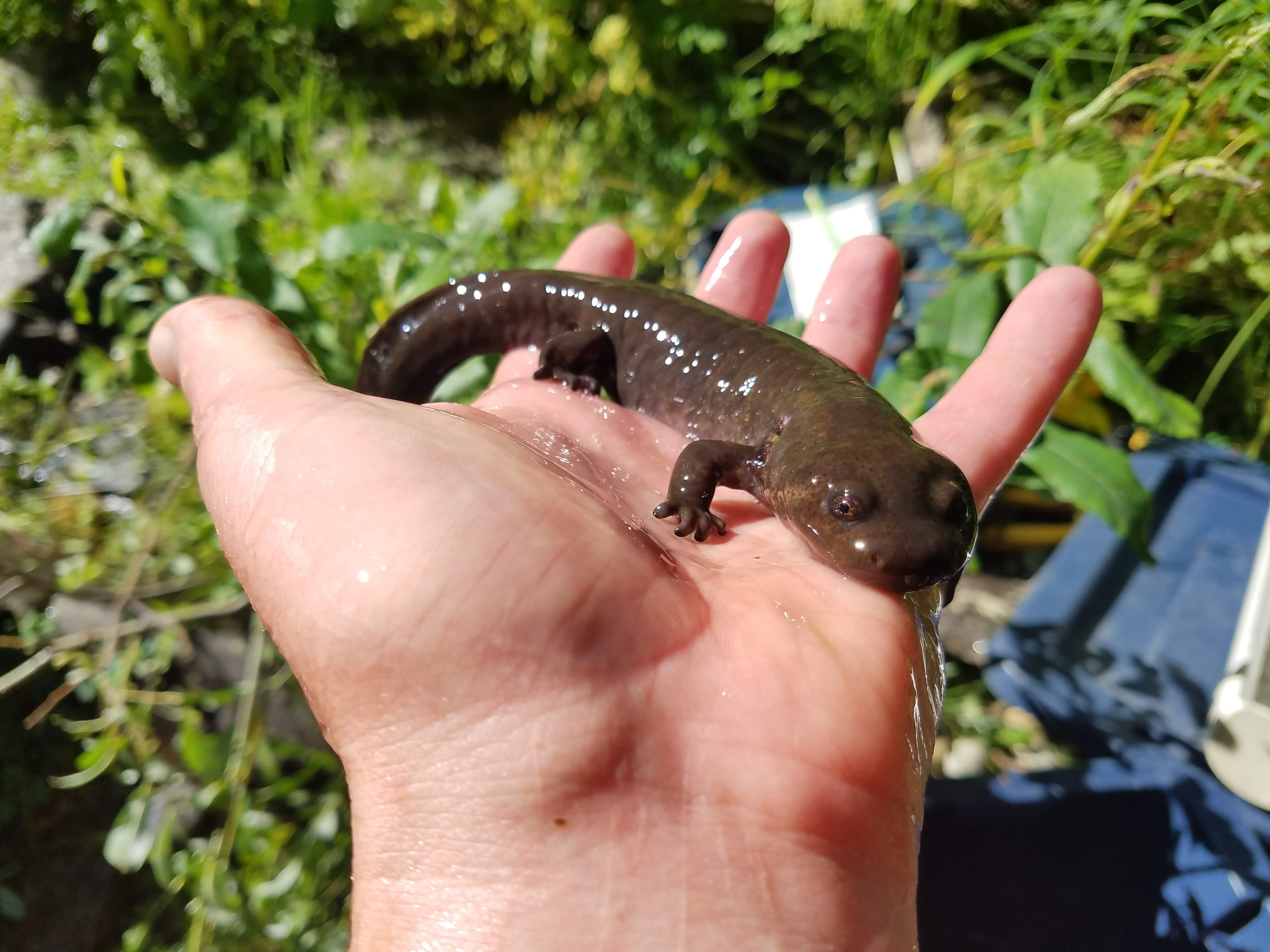
- Neotenic adult

Conservation status
- Least Concern (IUCN 3.1)

Scientific classification
- Kingdom: Animalia
- Phylum: Chordata
- Class: Amphibia
- Order: Urodela
- Family: Ambystomatidae
- Genus: Dicamptodon
- Species: D. aterrimus

Binomial name
- Dicamptodon aterrimus (Cope, 1867 [1868])

= Idaho giant salamander =

Species of amphibian

The Idaho giant salamander (Dicamptodon aterrimus) is a species of salamander. There are three closely related species to this taxon: D. ensatus (California giant salamander), D. copei (Cope's giant salamander) and D. tenebrosus (coastal giant salamander, also known as the Pacific giant salamander.

== Description ==
The Idaho giant salamander is the darkest and most intricately blotched of the giant salamanders. They vary between brown, purple, tan, grey, and a copperish color. Tiger salamanders and Idaho giant salamanders have superficial resemblance pertaining to size and shape, but the costal grooves and foot tubercles are significantly different between the two species. This salamander has a defining thick head and body and a fourth toe on the hind foot with only three segments. Adults are typically 20 cm (7.8 inches) in length but often vary between 7 and 11.75 inches long and may be observed around 13 inches at maximum length.

Small external gills adapted for small stream living can be found on their larvae. Their larvae are usually tan with yellow blotches over their dermis. They can undergo paedomorphosis, but the ratio of terrestrial adults to paedomorphic adults is unknown due to sampling biases (most studies on the salamander are conducted in streams, where terrestrial adults are unlikely to be found).

== Distribution ==
This species of salamander is found in forested watersheds from lake Coeur d'Alene to the Salmon River, and in two locations in Montana around Mineral County.

== Behavior ==
Larvae are predators but tend to sit and wait for their food to come to them. Usually they feed on small invertebrates and some small vertebrates. This can include tadpoles, fish, and other salamanders. Adults usually feed on terrestrial vertebrates and invertebrates. They will eat things as large as shrews, mice, and small snakes, along with other salamanders. They will eat anything that they can catch.

Fish, weasels, water shrews, and garter snakes are a few of their predators. To help defend against these predators they have a few strong defense mechanisms to help them survive. They use toxic secretion from their skin, warning postures, a "bark" vocalization, and they will bite. An Idaho giant salamander bite can easily break the skin of a human.
