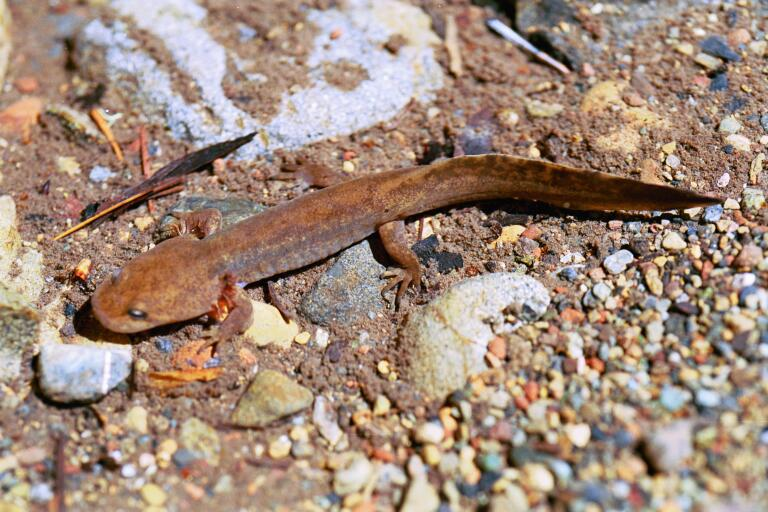

Conservation status
- Near Threatened (IUCN 3.1)

Scientific classification
- Kingdom: Animalia
- Phylum: Chordata
- Class: Amphibia
- Order: Urodela
- Family: Ambystomatidae
- Genus: Dicamptodon
- Species: D. ensatus

Binomial name
- Dicamptodon ensatus (Eschscholtz, 1833)
- IUCN range map for D. ensatus, Version 2022-2

Synonyms
- Triton ensatus Eschscholtz, 1833

= California giant salamander =

Species of amphibian

The California giant salamander (Dicamptodon ensatus) is a species of salamander in the family Ambystomatidae. D. ensatus is endemic to California, in the western United States. Terrestrial adults spend most of their lives on land in close proximity to fresh water. In contrast, during breeding, in larval development, and neoteny they spend their time inside shallow fresh water. The species once additionally included individuals now belonging to the species D. aterrimus (Idaho giant salamander) and D. tenebrosus (coastal giant salamander), under the common name Pacific giant salamander now refers to the whole genus.

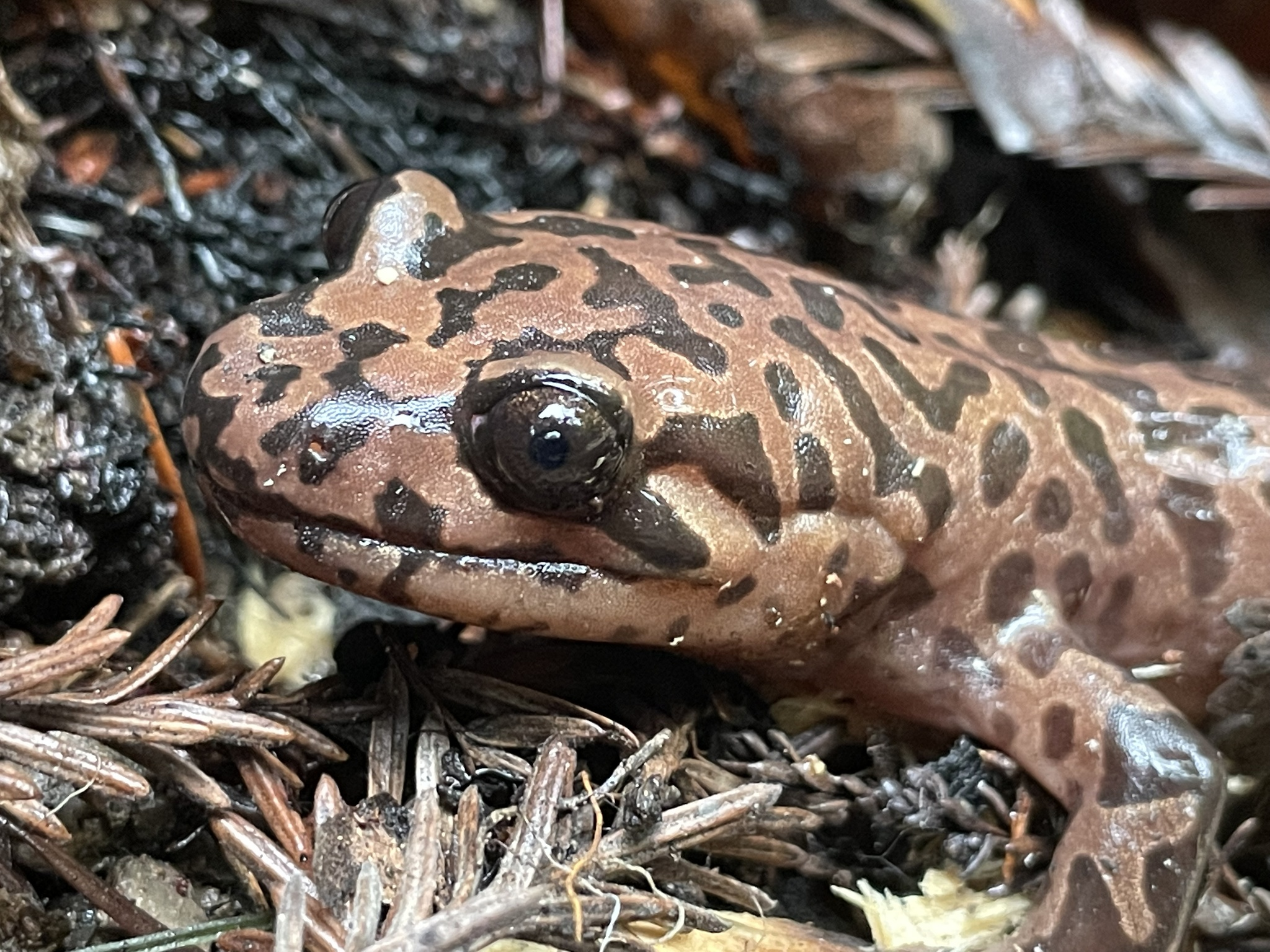
Terrestrial Adult in Santa Cruz County, CA (November, 2022)

== Taxonomy ==
A 1989 genetic study showed that the Dicamptodon genus consists of four species. The Pacific giant salamander, which includes the Idaho giant salamander (D. aterrimus) in Idaho, the coastal giant salamander (D. tenebrosus) (ranging from northern California to Washington) and the California giant salamander (D. ensatus) (ranging from Santa Cruz County to Mendocino County), both of which occur in a narrow hybrid zone in California.The fourth species, Cope's giant salamander (D. copei) on the Olympic Peninsula, Washington, is distinct.

== Distribution and habitat ==
=== Geographic range ===
The California giant salamander is endemic to Northern California and lives up to 6,500 feet (2,000 m) primarily in damp, coastal forests including coast Douglas fir (Pseudotsuga menziesii var. menziesii) and California coast redwood (Sequoia sempervirens) in both montane and valley-foothill riparian habitats. They tend to be common where they occur. The adult terrestrial form is found under surface litter and in tunnels, while the adult aquatic and larval forms are found mainly in cool, rocky streams and occasionally in lakes and ponds.

It is found in two (possibly three) isolated regions. The first range includes Sonoma, Napa, and Marin Counties, southwestern Lake County, western Glenn County, and southern Mendocino County. The other documented region is south of the San Francisco Bay from central San Mateo County to southern Santa Cruz County plus western Santa Clara County. The California giant salamander does not occur in the East Bay, forming a gap between these two populations. There is an unconfirmed sight record from Big Sur in Monterey County, approximately 75 miles (100 km) to the south of the documented population in the Santa Cruz area.

=== Habitat preference ===
The natural habitats of D. ensatus are damp temperate forests and clear, cold freshwater streams, ponds, and lakes. These habitats are threatened by stream siltation and urban development. Additionally, changes in land usage, including increased urbanization, timbering, and agriculture, all contribute to habitat fragmentation. Despite these changes, the species is only moderately threatened due to existing on several protected areas.

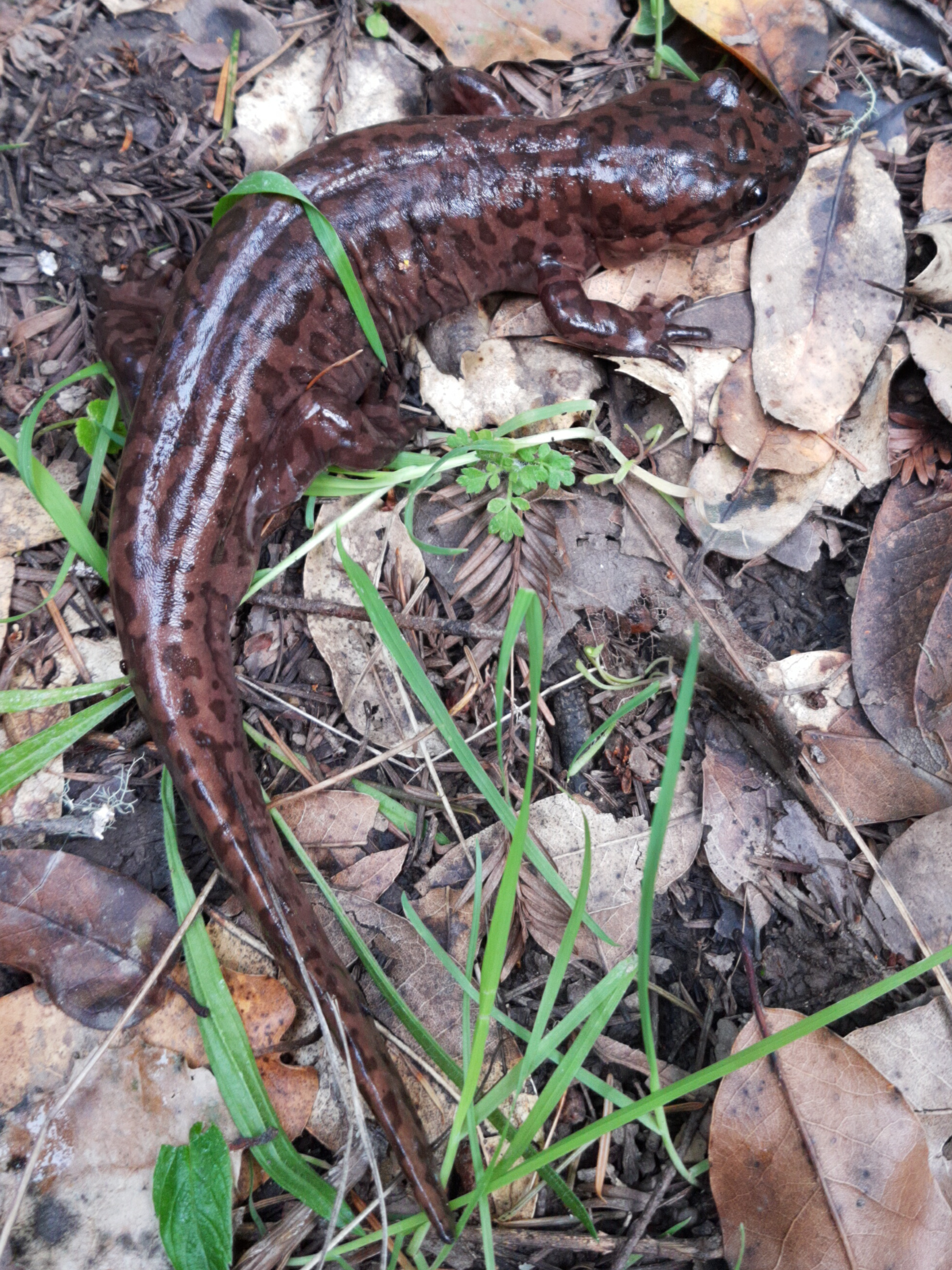
Terrestrial adult in Pescadero Creek County Park, San Mateo county, CA

Commonly found near hiding spaces like large rocks or wood, within close proximity to leafed debris, small shallow forms of water, and moist soil near banks.

Studies have found the California giant salamander to be a good indicator species for the health of headwater streams.

Adult salamanders were found near deteriorating waterway infrastructure, however more research is needed to be determine if this is a preferred habitat.

== Description ==
The adult California giant salamander can reach 17–30.5 cm (6.7–12.0 in) in total length (including tail).

Like most salamanders, the California giant salamander has four toes on the front feet and five toes on the back feet. The California giant salamander's tail is approximately 40% of the total length of the salamander and is laterally compressed. The head, back, and sides of the salamander have a marbled or reticulate pattern of dark blotches on a light brown or brassy-colored background. They have a broad head with a shovel-like snout and a fold of skin across the throat called the gular fold. The eyes are medium in size and have a brass-flecked iris and a large black pupil. This species is one of the few salamanders capable of vocalizing, emitting a barking or clicking sound.

== Behavior and ecology ==
=== Activity ===
The California giant salamander is predominantly nocturnal.

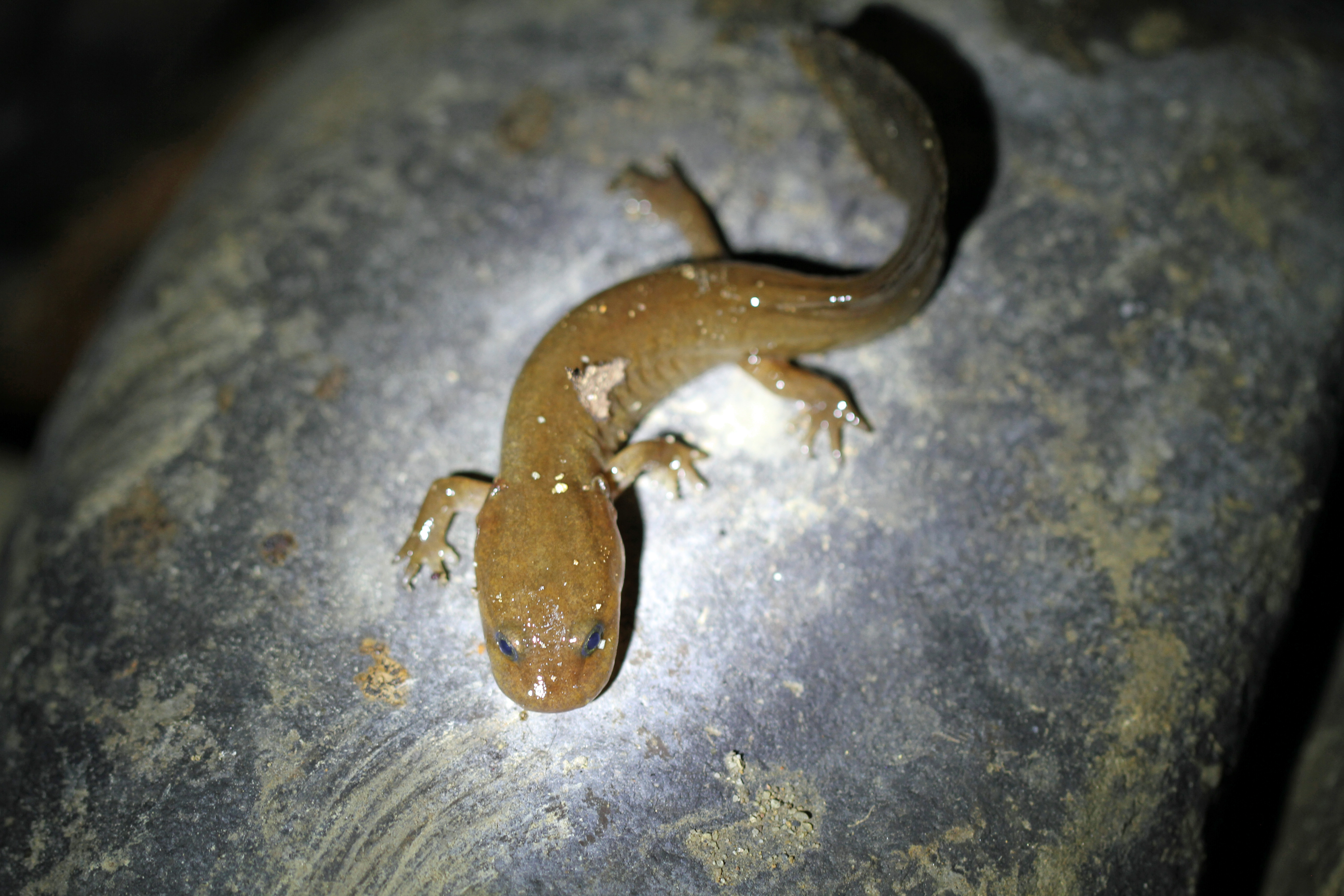
Night observation of a teen (some gills present). San Mateo County, CA (September, 2014)

Diurnal activity can occur after the first rains following dry spells, in maintained rain, and during mating season when within 150 to 200 ft (46 to 61 m) of a water source.

=== Diet ===
Terrestrial adults search for prey such as snails, slugs, insects (such as beetles, caddisfly larvae, moths, and flies), other invertebrates, small mice (such as white-footed mice), shrews, possibly reptiles, and other amphibians (including reports of smaller D. ensatus) under surface objects and in tunnels. Aquatic adults and larvae eat aquatic invertebrates, fish, snakes, and other amphibians.

=== Predators ===
The California giant salamander is preyed upon by the American water shrew (Sorex palustris) and the Sierra garter snake (Thamnophis couchi). As noted above, there are reports of cannibalism between individuals of the species.

== Reproduction and development ==
=== Breeding ===
The California giant salamander breeds from March to May, with egg-laying peaking in May.

Some occurrences of breeding in autumn have been reported. Both seasons have extremely maintained wet conditions, which are important for sexually mature adults. Terrestrial adults will migrate out from under rocks and logs to find puddles and streams to find mates.

=== Reproduction ===
Reproduction of California giant salamanders are observed to be in aquatic environments like small puddles and fresh water streams, with fertilization being internal. Mothers will guard their egg clutch for months until they hatch, to protect from egg cannibalism. Terrestrial adults have been found with embryos or eggs in their stomachs, indicating the occurrence of egg cannibalism. During this time, the females do not eat.

=== Egg deposition ===
Fresh California giant salamander eggs are white and are smaller than 6.4 mm (0.25 in).

Eggs are concealed several feet below the surface in cold, slowly flowing water often beneath rocks and coarse woody debris in stream bottoms.

=== Larval stage ===
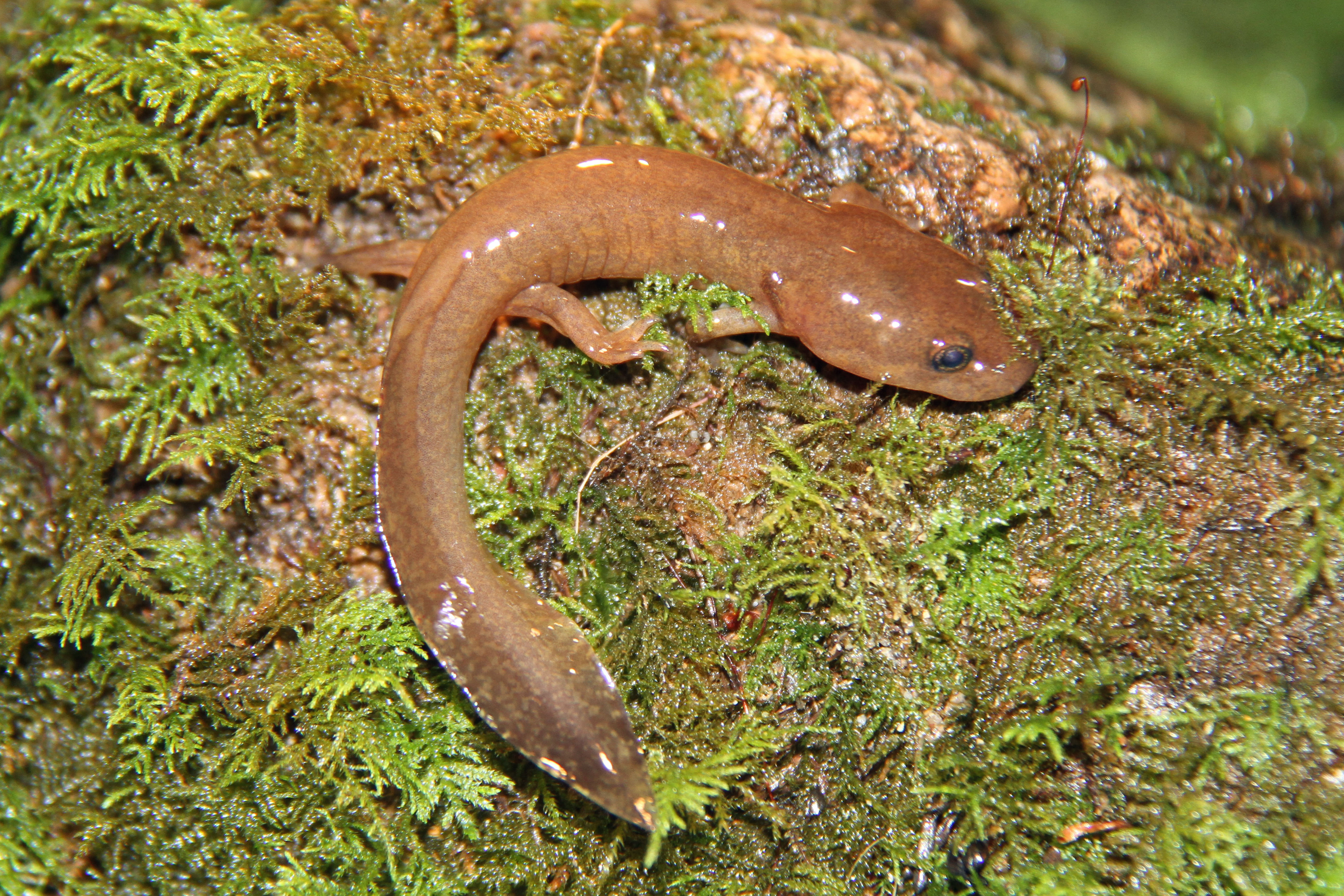
Night observation of a teen (some gills present). Purisima Creek, San Mateo County, CA (July, 2011)

Once hatched in water, the larval stage of the life cycle begins where California giant salamanders grow approximately half an inch per month in the best conditions. Larvae typically lose their external gills and transform to terrestrial adults after 1 to 2 years. In permanently perennial streams, adults may retain their gills and become aquatic adults.

=== Neotenes ===
Some California giant salamander larvae exhibit neoteny, continuing to grow into adults and become sexually mature without losing their external gills. Adult-sized neotenes have a uniform brown coloring on their heads, sides, and backs with retained external gills which allow them to live in perennial streams as aquatic adults.

== Diseases and threats ==
Disease has been known to lead to significant mortalities of the California giant salamander. In 2021, California Department of Fish and Wildlife observed poor body conditions and skin lesions on individuals at multiple sites due to parasitic infections. These parasitic infections consisted of trematodes and metacercaria parasites. In these populations of salamanders, these parasitic infections could be exacerbated by drought, overcrowding, and increased temperatures.
