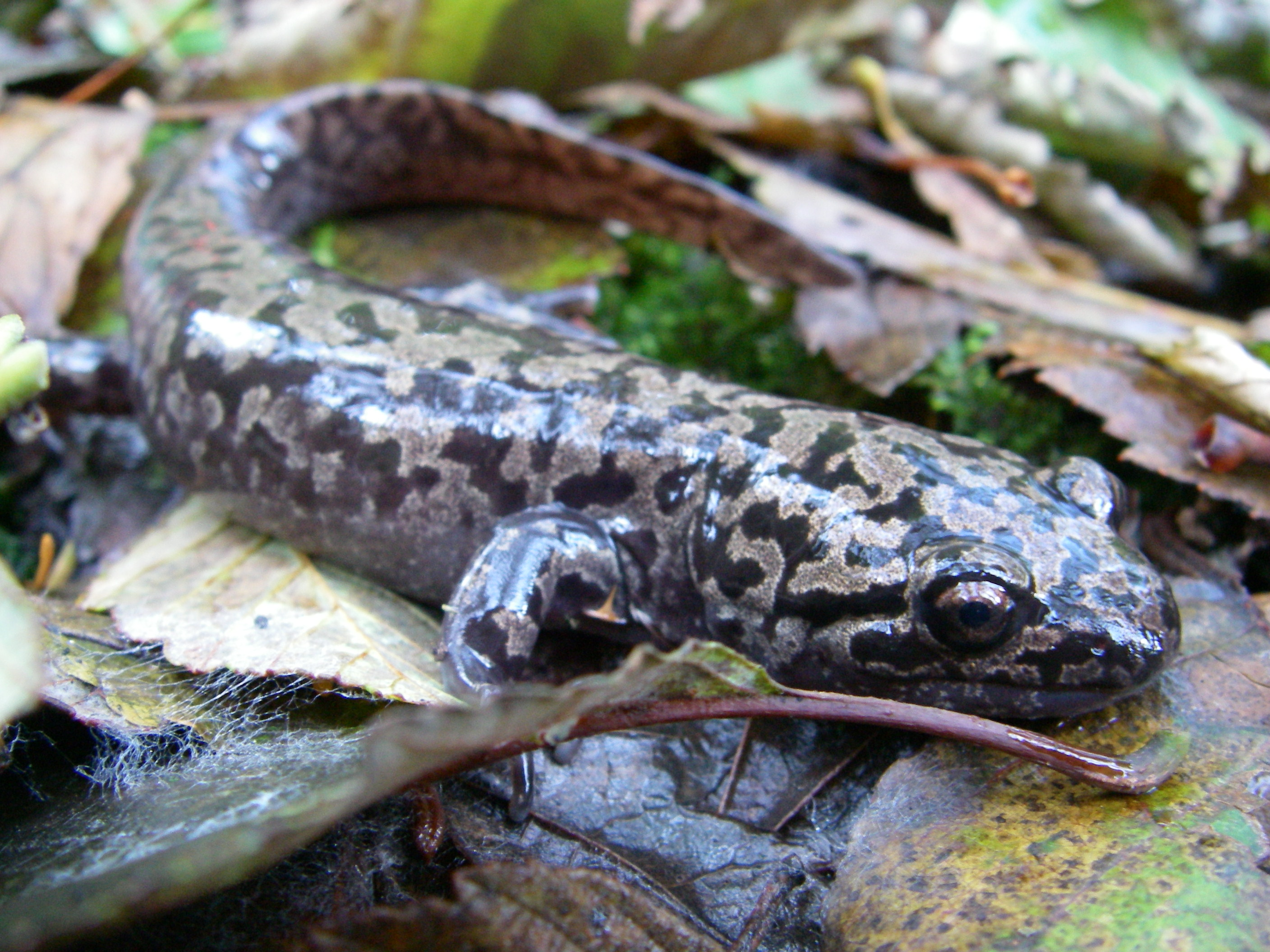

Conservation status
- Least Concern (IUCN 3.1)

Scientific classification
- Kingdom: Animalia
- Phylum: Chordata
- Class: Amphibia
- Order: Urodela
- Family: Ambystomatidae
- Genus: Dicamptodon
- Species: D. tenebrosus

Binomial name
- Dicamptodon tenebrosus (Baird and Girard, 1852)

Synonyms
- Amblystoma tenebrosum Baird and Girard, 1852

= Coastal giant salamander =

Species of amphibian

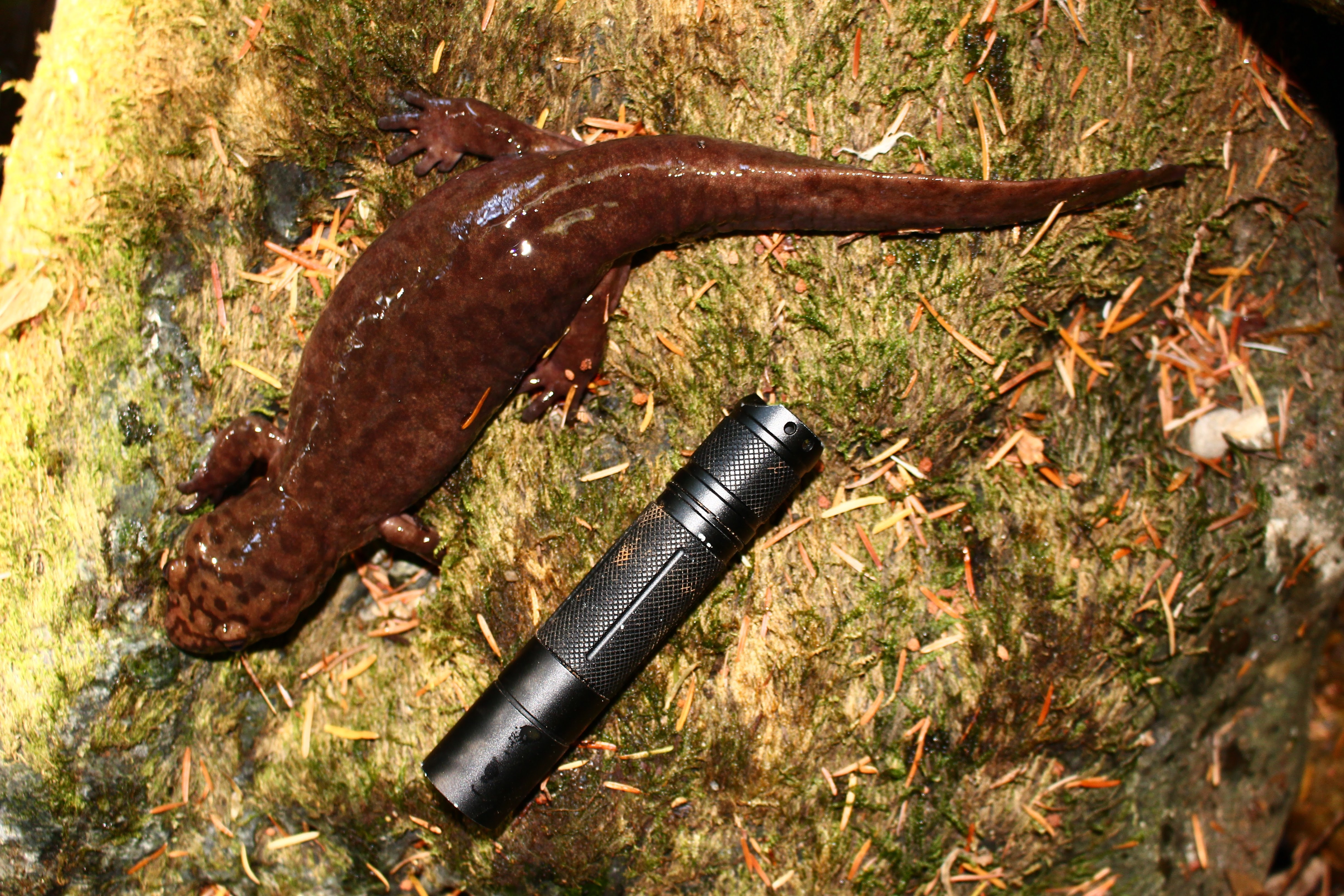
Dicamptodon tenebrosus next to 120mm flashlight

The coastal giant salamander (Dicamptodon tenebrosus) is a species of salamander in the genus Dicamptodon (Pacific giant salamanders). It is endemic to the Pacific Northwest of North America. There are three closely related species to this taxon: D. ensatus (California giant salamander), D. copei (Cope's giant salamander), and D. aterrimus (Idaho giant salamander).

== Description ==
The coastal giant salamander can reach up to 33 cm (13 in) in total length as a terrestrial adult, and 35.5 cm (14.0 in) in paedomorphic forms, making it the largest terrestrial salamander in North America. The coastal giant salamander has stout limbs with four toes on the front feet and five toes on the back feet. The species tail is around 40 percent of the total length of the salamander and is laterally compressed. The head, back, and sides have a marbled or reticulate pattern of dark blotches on a light brown or brassy-colored background. The head is broad with a shovel-like snout and a fold of skin across the throat called the gular fold. The eyes are medium in size and have a brass-flecked iris and a large black pupil. This species is one of the few salamanders capable of vocalizing.

=== Life history ===
A female coastal giant salamander will lay her eggs in moderate to slow flowing mountain streams under rocks and crevasses, hatching in early to mid spring. The coastal giant salamander, being a member of the genus Dicamptodon, exhibits two distinctive phases within its life; an aquatic larval stage with filamentous gills and an elongated tail with a caudal fin (similar to that of a tadpole), and a terrestrial adult form losing their caudal fin and filamentous gills, and instead developing robust legs and a pair of internal lungs.

=== Neoteny ===
Some coastal giant salamander larvae continue to grow into adults and become sexually mature without losing their external gills. This process is called neoteny. Neoteny is particularly common in the British Columbia populations. Adult-sized neotenes have a uniform brown coloring on their heads, sides, and backs.

== Behavior ==
=== Activity level ===
Terrestrial adult coastal giant salamanders spend most of their time underground in burrows, emerging to reproduce and forage on rainy and humid nights.

=== Foraging and diet ===
Adult coastal giant salamanders, like most of the genus Dicamptodon, are opportunistic feeders feeding on anything they can fit in their mouth. This may include, but is not limited to; slugs, insects, worms and other invertebrates as well as small vertebrates such as small rodents, snakes, and other giant salamanders. In the larval stage, coastal giant salamanders will feed on small macroinvertebrates such as insect larvae as well as small fish and mollusks. Both adult and larval coastal salamanders have been recorded consuming other individuals of the same species.

=== Defense ===
When threatened an adult coastal giant salamander will arch its back and lash its tail forward. Coastal giant salamanders excrete toxins through their skin which will cause nausea if consumed. Adult coastal giant salamanders can produce a painful bite.

== Range ==
The coastal giant salamander is endemic to the Pacific Northwest, found in Northern California, Oregon, Washington, and southern British Columbia.

== Habitat ==
Aquatic stages are found in clear, cool or cold, well-oxygenated streams, and sometimes also in mountain lakes and ponds. Metamorphosed adults are found in humid forests (under rocks and logs, etc.), near mountain streams, or rocky shores of mountain lakes.

== Conservation ==
Pacific giant salamanders are protected from being killed or collected under the Wildlife Act in British Columbia.
