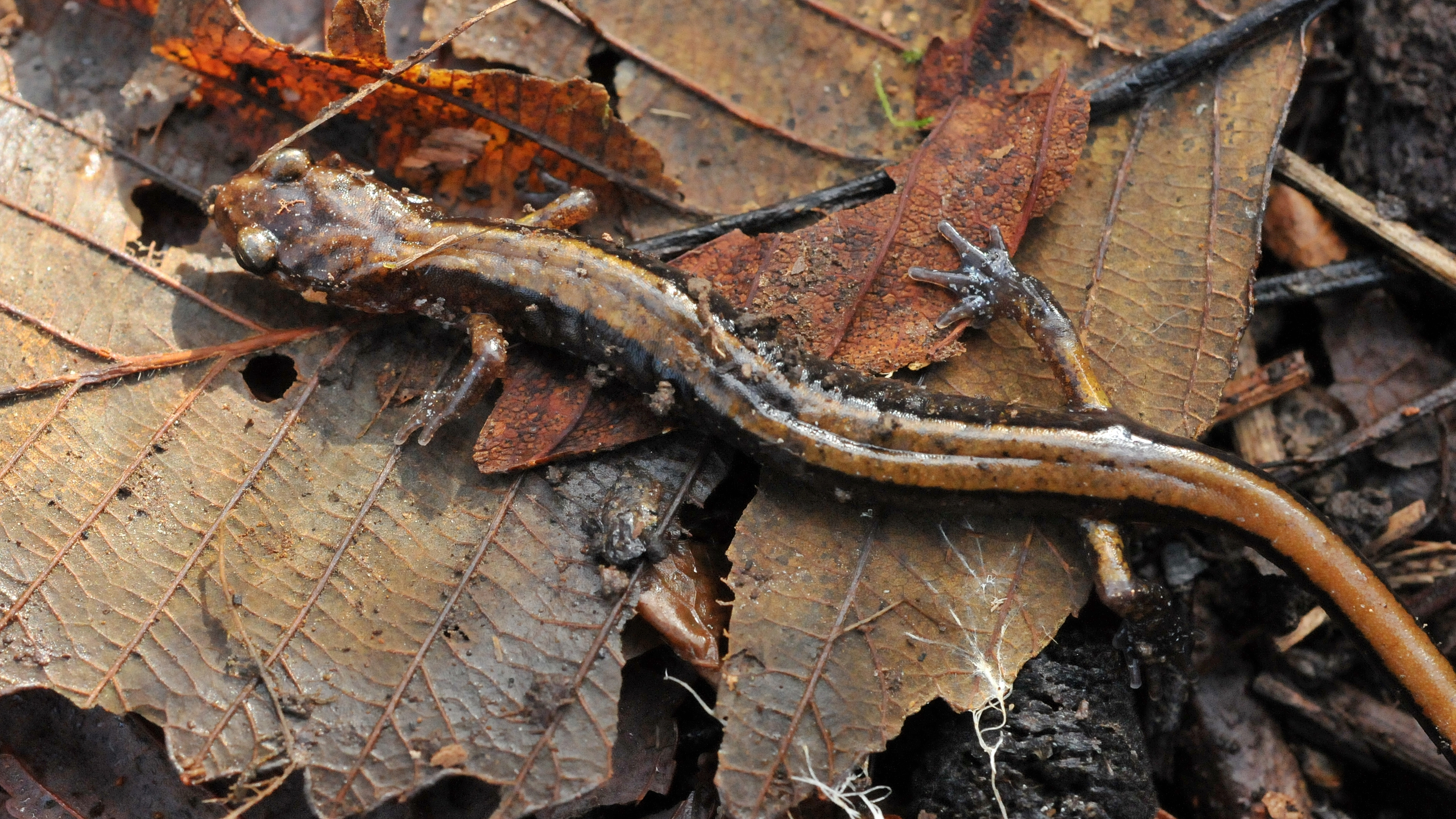

Conservation status
- Least Concern (IUCN 3.1)

Scientific classification
- Kingdom: Animalia
- Phylum: Chordata
- Class: Amphibia
- Order: Urodela
- Family: Plethodontidae
- Genus: Plethodon
- Species: P. vehiculum

Binomial name
- Plethodon vehiculum (Cooper, 1860)

= Western redback salamander =

Species of amphibian

The western red-backed salamander (Plethodon vehiculum) is a species of salamander in the family Plethodontidae. The species is found in extreme southwestern Canada and the northwestern United States. The western red-backed salamander is found in temperate rainforests of the Pacific Northwest. It is considered widespread in the region and is not strictly associated with a specific habitat type.

== Description ==
The western red-backed salamander has a slender build with relatively short limbs. Adults average 1.5 to 2 in (3.8 to 5.1 cm) in snout-to-vent length (SVL), and 3 to 4.5 in (7.6 to 11.4 cm) in total length (including tail). The western red-backed salamander has a colored stripe on its back, which extends from the anterior of the head to the end of the tail. The coloration of the stripe is highly variable, ranging from the typical reddish orange to bright yellow, with melanism also being documented in the species.

== Distribution and habitat ==
The western red-backed salamander is found from southwestern Oregon to southwestern British Columbia. Within that geographic range, the salamander is found from the western slopes of the Cascade Mountains to the Pacific Coast. The western red-backed salamander has been found on Vancouver Island. A variety of habitats are inhabited by the salamander, including temperate forests, rocky talus slopes, and riparian areas.
