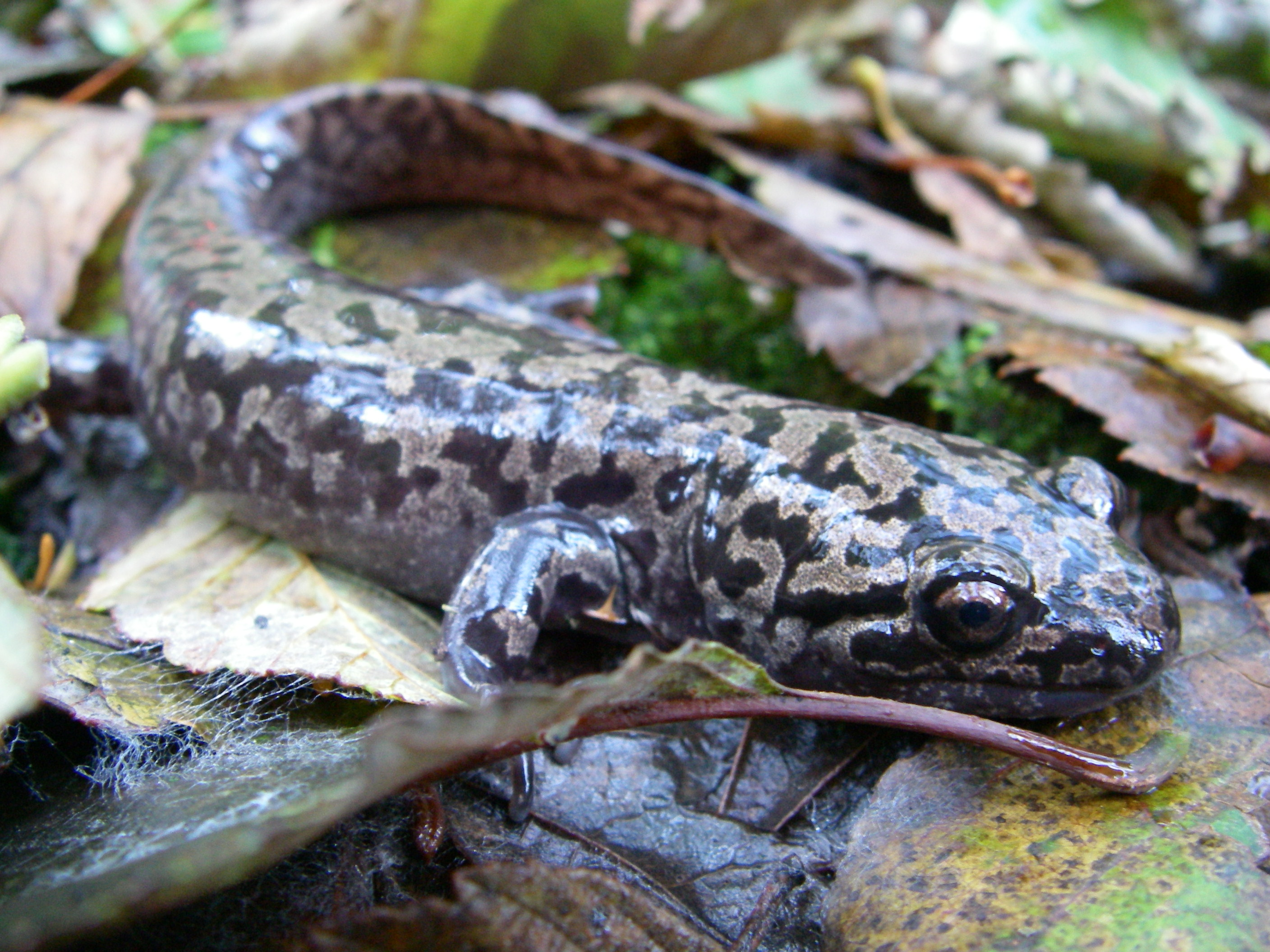
- Dicamptodon tenebrosus

Scientific classification
- Kingdom: Animalia
- Phylum: Chordata
- Class: Amphibia
- Order: Urodela
- Family: Ambystomatidae
- Genus: Dicamptodon; Strauch, 1870

Type species
- Salamandra ensata Eschscholtz, 1833

Synonyms
- Chondrotus Cope, 1887

= Pacific giant salamander =

Pacific giant salamanders Temporal range: Paleocene to recent, 58.7–0 Ma

Genus of salamanders

The Pacific giant salamanders are members of the genus Dicamptodon. They are large salamanders endemic to the Pacific Northwest in North America. They are included in the family Ambystomatidae, or alternatively, in their own monogeneric family Dicamptodontidae.

== Description ==
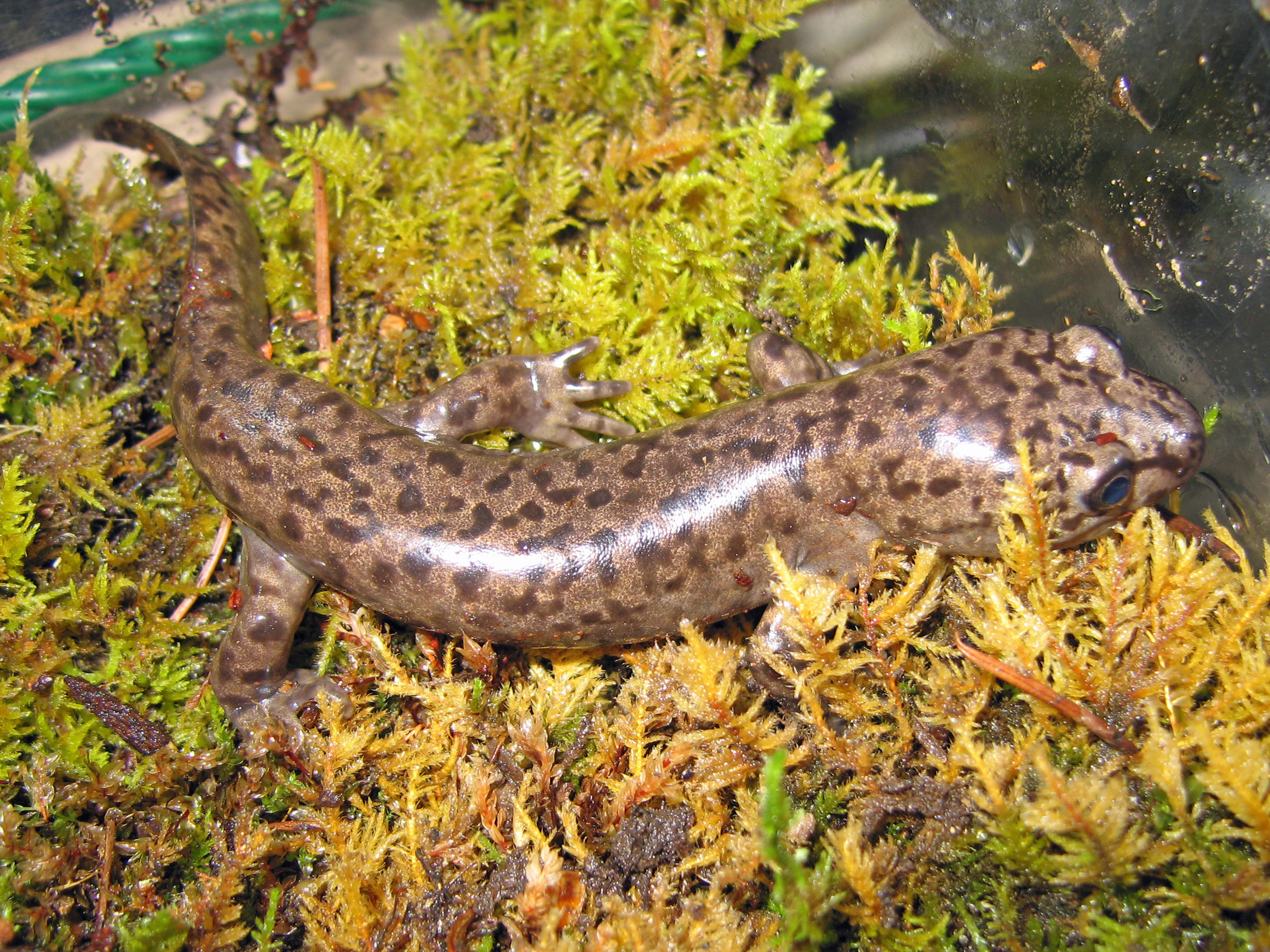
Dicamptodon tenebrosus

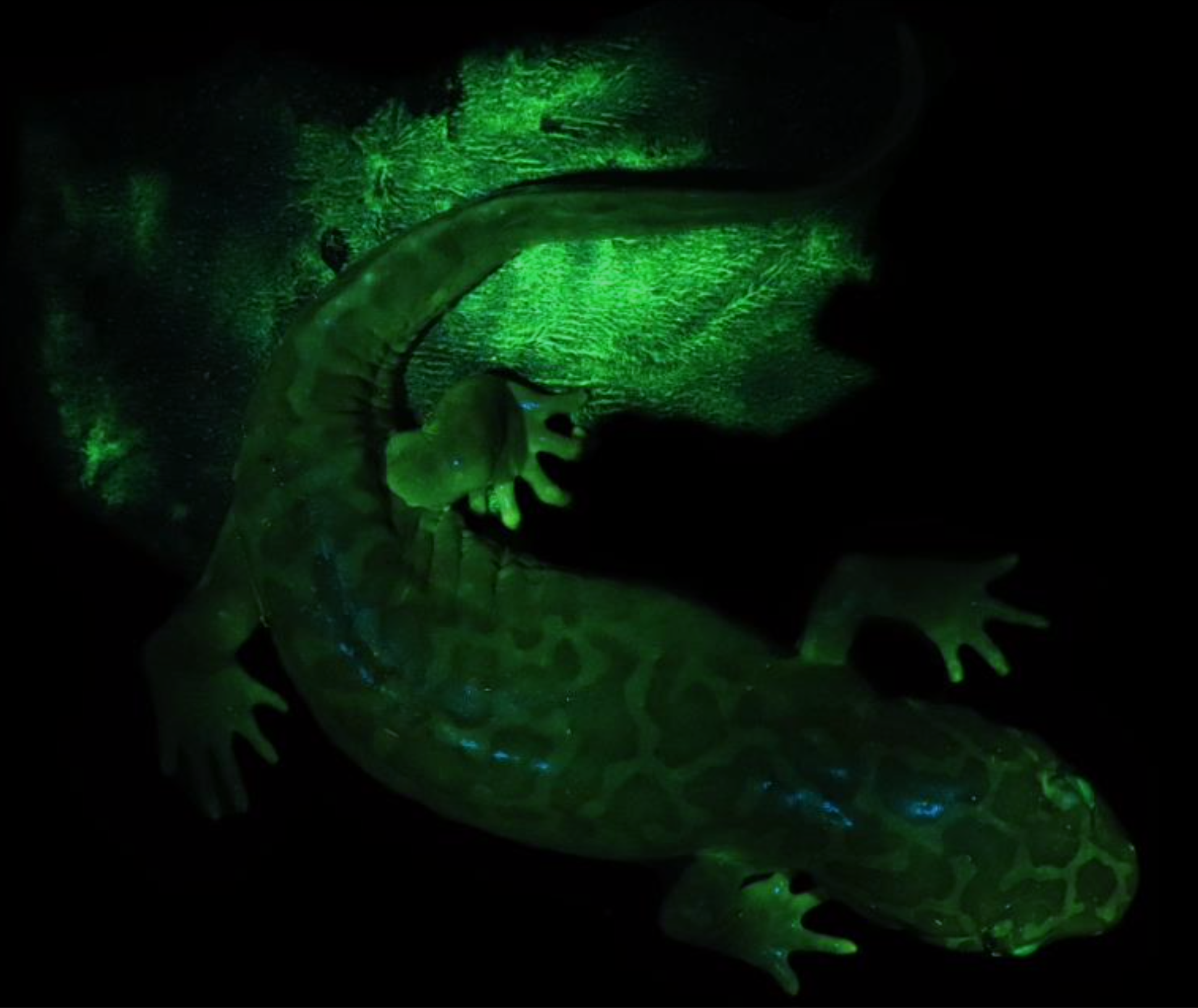
A Pacific giant salamander and its fluorescent urine imaged with blue excitation light

Pacific giant salamanders are defined by their wide protruding eyes, costal grooves, thick arms, and dark background coloring. Dicamptodon have a snout-vent-length (SVL) of 350 mm (14 in), a broad head, laterally flexible flattened tails, paired premaxillae that are separate from the nasals, and the aquatic larvae have gills. Dicamptodon have lacrimals and pterygoids that are present, but quadratojugal are absent.

While most salamanders are silent, the Pacific giant salamander is one of several salamanders that have vocal abilities. When startled, these salamanders may respond with a croaky-sounding cry similar to that of a barking dog.

== Habitat ==
Pacific giant salamanders are semi-aquatic animals that occupy both aquatic and terrestrial habitats. They are commonly found in various lotic environments in altitudes ranging from 0 to 7000 feet above sea level in the Pacific Northwest and Northern California. Aquatic salamander abundance has been shown to increase with increasing rock coverage, and decrease with increasing water velocity, and tend to prefer cold mountain streams and lakes. Pacific giant salamanders also utilize terrestrial refuge sites such as decaying wood, burrows, or under rocks.

== Taxonomy ==
The genus Dicamptodon was formerly thought to contain two species, Cope's giant salamander (D. copei) on the Olympic Peninsula, Washington, and the Pacific giant salamander (D. ensatus) which consisted of three geographic populations, an Idaho isolate, a group in northern California, and a group in Oregon and Washington. In 1989, genetic studies showed D. copei to be a distinct species, and the D. ensatus populations to consist of three species: the Idaho giant salamander (D. aterrimus) in Idaho, and two highly divergent species with a narrow hybrid zone in California, the coastal giant salamander (D. tenebrosus) (ranging from northern California to Washington), and the California giant salamander (D. ensatus) (limited only from Santa Cruz County to Mendocino County in California). The earliest known member of this genus and family is D. antiquus from the Paleocene of Alberta.

=== Extant species ===
There are four extant Dicamptodon species.

Image	Scientific name	Common name	Distribution
	Dicamptodon aterrimus	Idaho giant salamander	forested watersheds from lake Coeur d’Alene to the Salmon River, and in two locations in Montana around Mineral County, Idaho
	Dicamptodon copei	Cope's giant salamander	Olympic Peninsula to northern Oregon
	Dicamptodon ensatus	California giant salamander	Northern California
	Dicamptodon tenebrosus	Coastal giant salamander	Northern California, Oregon, Washington, and southern British Columbia.

== Intrinsic Phylogeny ==
- - Dicamptodon tenebrosus
  - - Dicamptodon ensatus
    - - Dicamptodon aterrimus
      - Dicamptodon copei

Intrinsic phylogeny tree of genus Dicamptodon.
