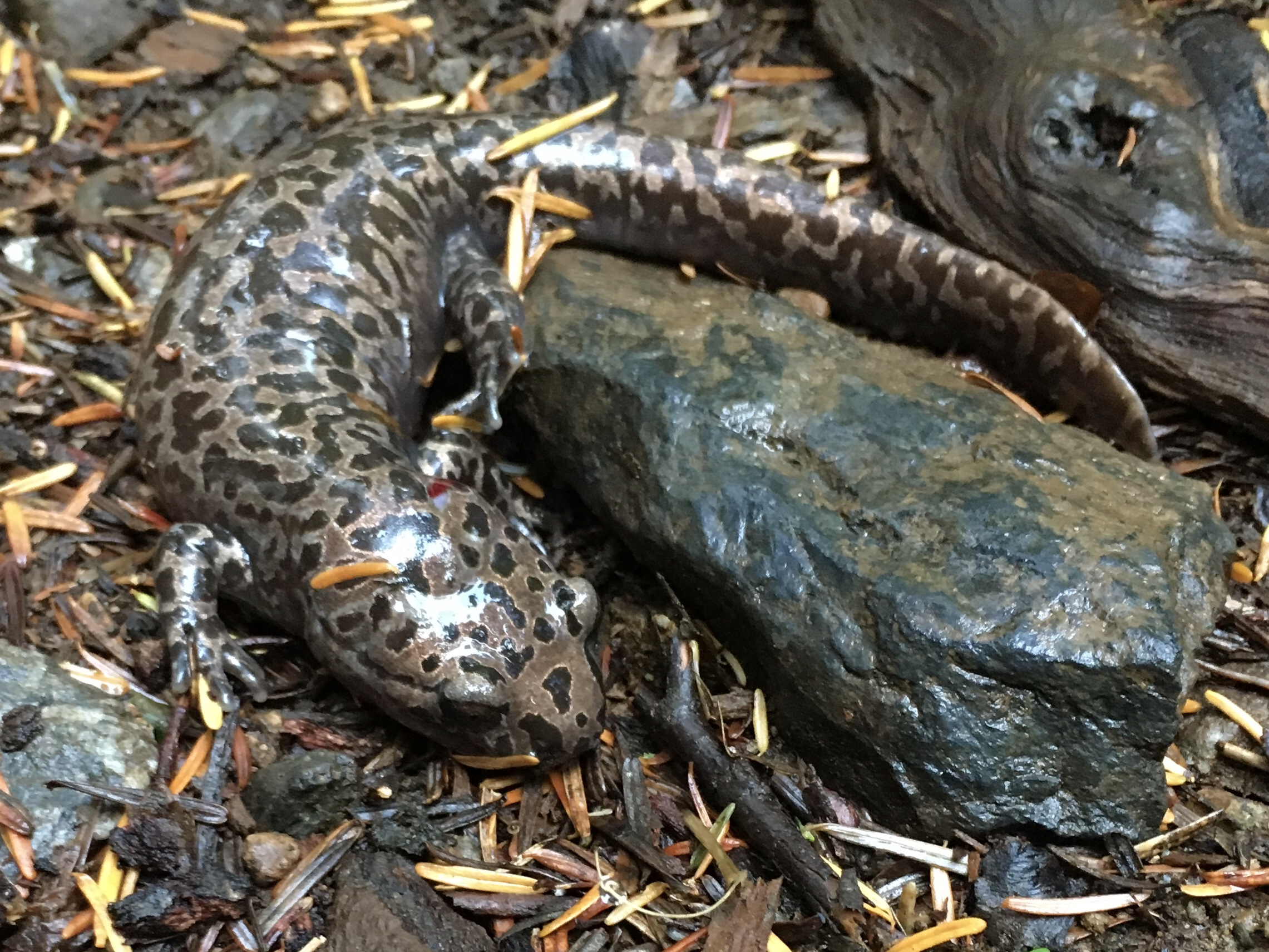

Conservation status
- Least Concern (IUCN 3.1)

Scientific classification
- Kingdom: Animalia
- Phylum: Chordata
- Class: Amphibia
- Order: Urodela
- Family: Ambystomatidae
- Genus: Dicamptodon
- Species: D. copei

Binomial name
- Dicamptodon copei Nussbaum, 1970

= Cope's giant salamander =

Species of amphibian

Cope's giant salamander (Dicamptodon copei) is a species of salamander in the family Dicamptodontidae, the Pacific giant salamanders. It is native to Washington and Oregon in the Pacific Northwest region of the United States.

== Description ==
This species can attain lengths up to 19.5 centimeters. It exhibits neoteny rarely undergoing metamorphosis to the adult form, and resembles the larvae of similar salamander species. It usually becomes sexually, but not physically, mature. It is gold and brown in color. The costal grooves are inconspicuous. It has a rounded snout and the laterally compressed, fin-like tail of a typical larva. It retains its gills.

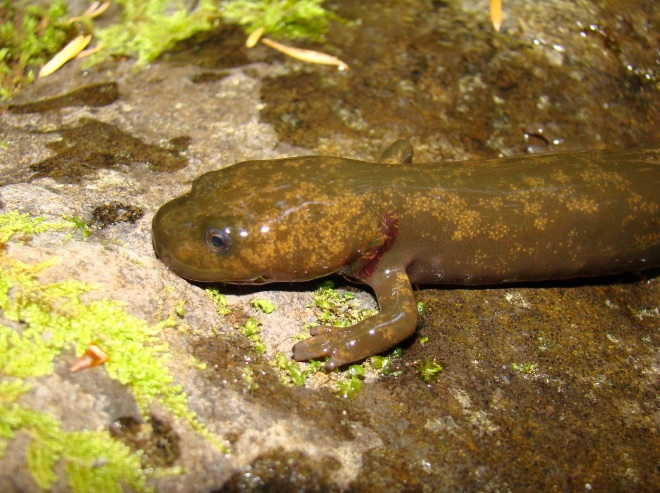
Dicamptodon copei larva

== Behavior ==
Little is known about the species' habitat requirements, but it has been found in mountain pools and streams. It feeds on smaller animals, such as fish, amphibians and their eggs, including the larvae of its own species.

The female lays a clutch of around 50 and up to 115 eggs in wet habitat near water bodies. She guards them and possibly defends them aggressively.

== Conservation ==
The range of this species extends from the Olympic Peninsula to northern Oregon. Its populations are likely stable to slightly declining. Threats include water temperature change and silt from nearby logging operations.
