= Nooksack =

Nooksack (Nooksack: Noxwsʼáʔaq) or Nootsack may refer to:

- Nooksack people, an American Indian tribe in Whatcom County, Washington
  - Nooksack language, the language of this tribe

== Places ==
- Nooksack River, a river in Whatcom County, Washington
  - Nooksack Valley, a valley formed by this river
- Nooksack, Washington, a town in Whatcom County, Washington

== Schools ==
- Nooksack Valley School District (commonly referred to as Nooksack), a school district in Whatcom County, Washington
  - Nooksack Valley High School, the high school of this school district
