= Ruth Mountain =

Mountain in Washington (state), United States

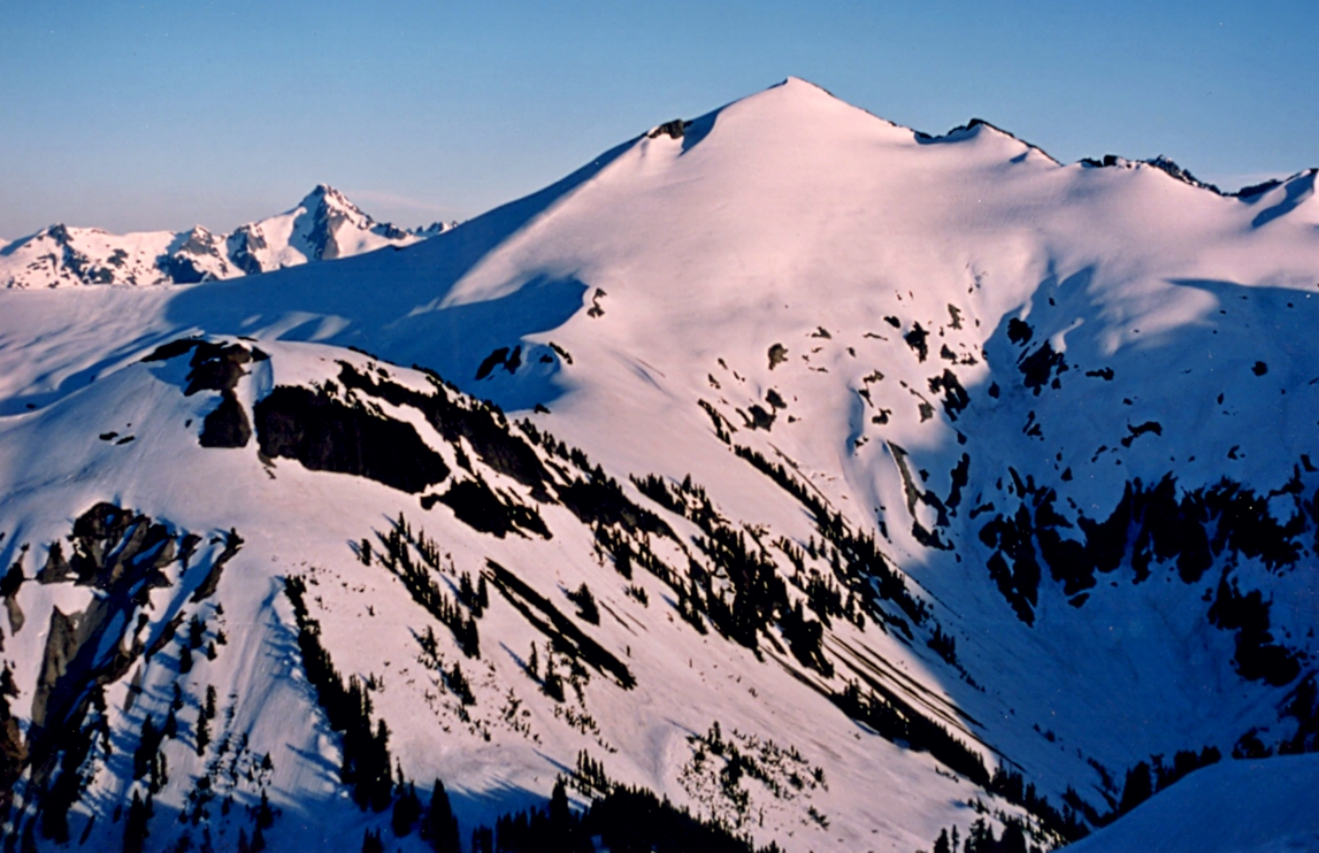
- Ruth Mountain seen from Hannegan Peak

Highest point
- Elevation: 7,115 ft (2,169 m)
- Prominence: 1,315 ft (401 m)
- Parent peak: Seahpo Peak (7,441 ft)
- Isolation: 2.85 mi (4.59 km)
- Coordinates: 48°51′35″N 121°31′58″W

Naming
- Etymology: Ruth Cleveland

Geography
- Location within Washington (state) Location within the United States
- Interactive map of Ruth Mountain
- Country: United States
- State: Washington
- County: Whatcom
- Protected area: Mount Baker Wilderness; North Cascades National Park
- Parent range: North Cascades
- Topo map: USGS Mount Shuksan

Climbing
- First ascent: 1916
- Easiest route: Scramble, glacier travel

Ruth Mountain is a 7,115 ft (2,169 m) Skagit Range summit located two miles south of Hannegan Pass in the North Cascades of Washington state in the United States. The name honors Ruth Cleveland, daughter of President Grover Cleveland. This mountain's toponym was officially adopted in 1952 by the United States Board on Geographic Names. Ruth Mountain is situated on the shared border of North Cascades National Park and the Mount Baker Wilderness, which is part of the Mount Baker-Snoqualmie National Forest. The summit offers views of Mount Shuksan, East Nooksack Glacier, Seahpo Peak, Nooksack Tower, Icy Peak, Mount Sefrit, Mineral Mountain, and the Picket Range. The melting and receding Ruth Glacier on the north slope of Ruth creates the headwaters for the Chilliwack River. Precipitation runoff also finds its way into the Nooksack and Baker Rivers.

== Climate ==
Ruth Mountain is located in the marine west coast climate zone of western North America. Most weather fronts originate in the Pacific Ocean, and travel northeast toward the Cascade Mountains. As fronts approach the North Cascades, they are forced upward by the peaks of the Cascade Range, causing them to drop their moisture in the form of rain or snowfall onto the Cascades. As a result, the west side of the North Cascades experiences high precipitation, especially during the winter months in the form of snowfall. During winter months, weather is usually cloudy, but, due to high pressure systems over the Pacific Ocean that intensify during summer months, there is often little or no cloud cover during the summer. Because of maritime influence, snow tends to be wet and heavy, resulting in high avalanche danger. The months July through September offer the most favorable weather for viewing or climbing this peak.

== Geology ==
The North Cascades features some of the most rugged topography in the Cascade Range with craggy peaks, ridges, and deep glacial valleys. Geological events occurring many years ago created the diverse topography and drastic elevation changes over the Cascade Range leading to the various climate differences. These climate differences lead to vegetation variety defining the ecoregions in this area.

The history of the formation of the Cascade Mountains dates back millions of years ago to the late Eocene Epoch. With the North American Plate overriding the Pacific Plate, episodes of volcanic igneous activity persisted. In addition, small fragments of the oceanic and continental lithosphere called terranes created the North Cascades about 50 million years ago.

During the Pleistocene period dating back over two million years ago, glaciation advancing and retreating repeatedly scoured the landscape leaving deposits of rock debris. The U-shaped cross section of the river valleys is a result of recent glaciation. Uplift and faulting in combination with glaciation have been the dominant processes which have created the tall peaks and deep valleys of the North Cascades area.

Ruth Mountain is a remnant of the Hannegan Caldera, a large extinct volcano.

== See also ==
- Geography of the North Cascades
- Geology of the Pacific Northwest

== Gallery ==
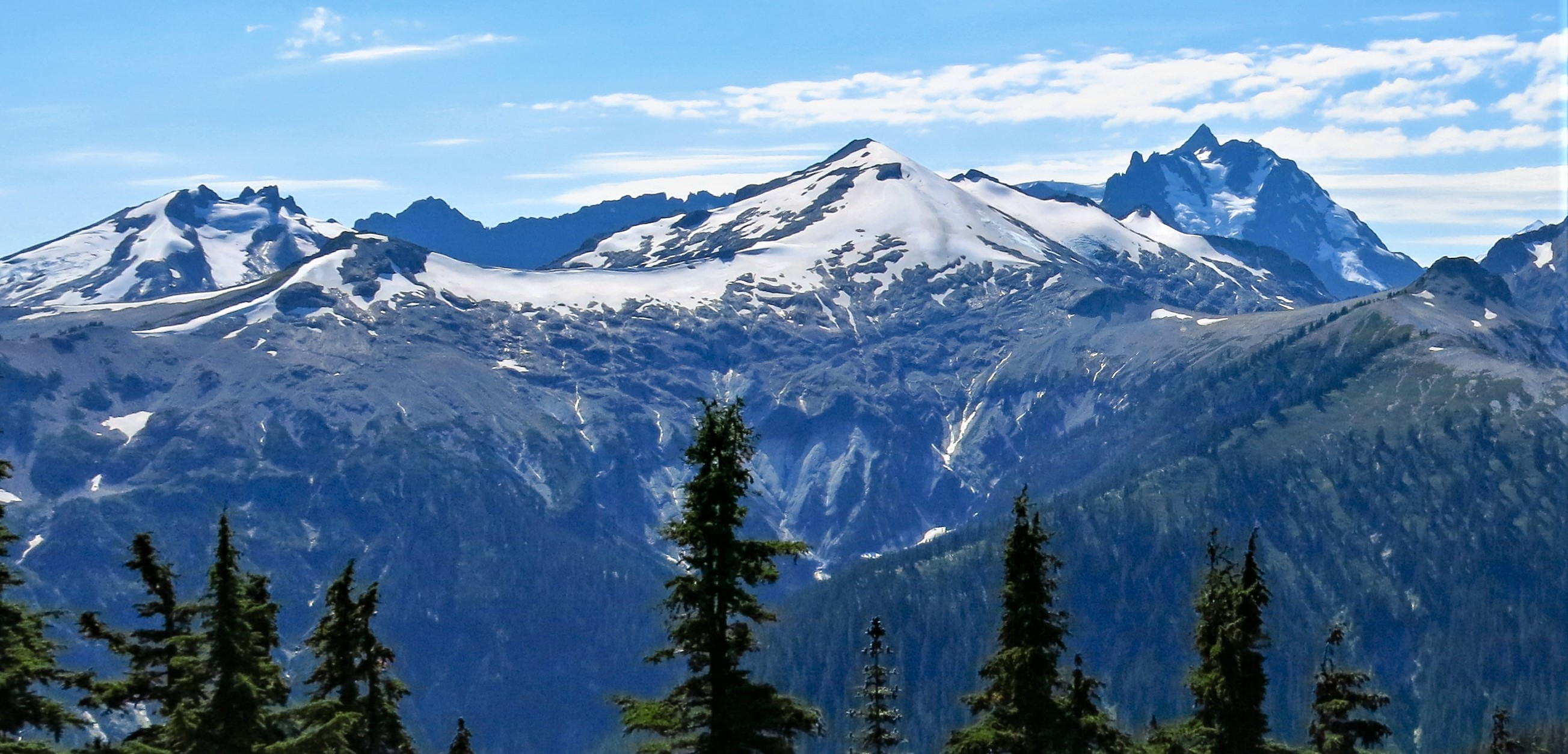
Icy Peak, Ruth Mountain, Mt. Shuksan from northeast

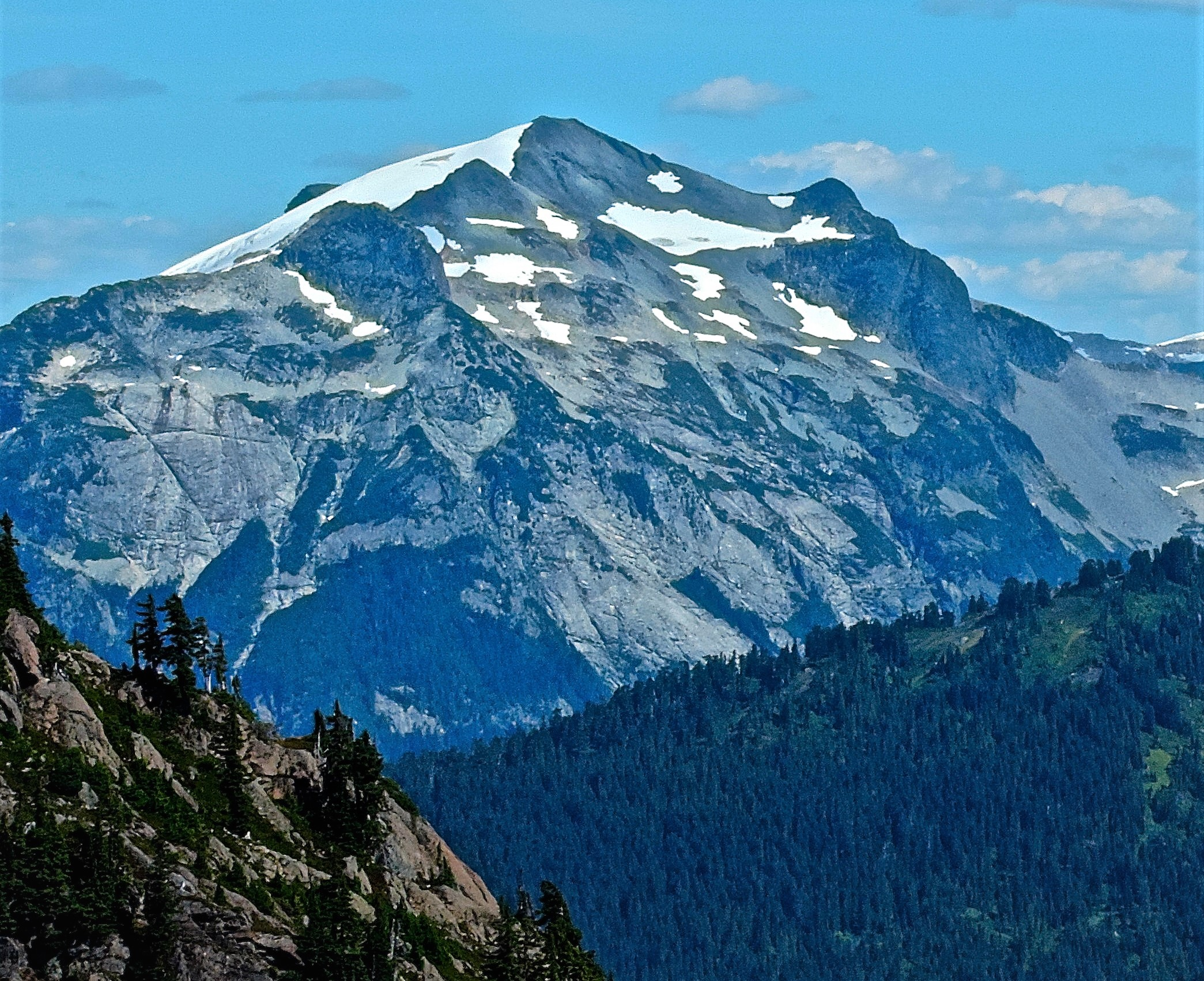
Ruth Mountain, west aspect

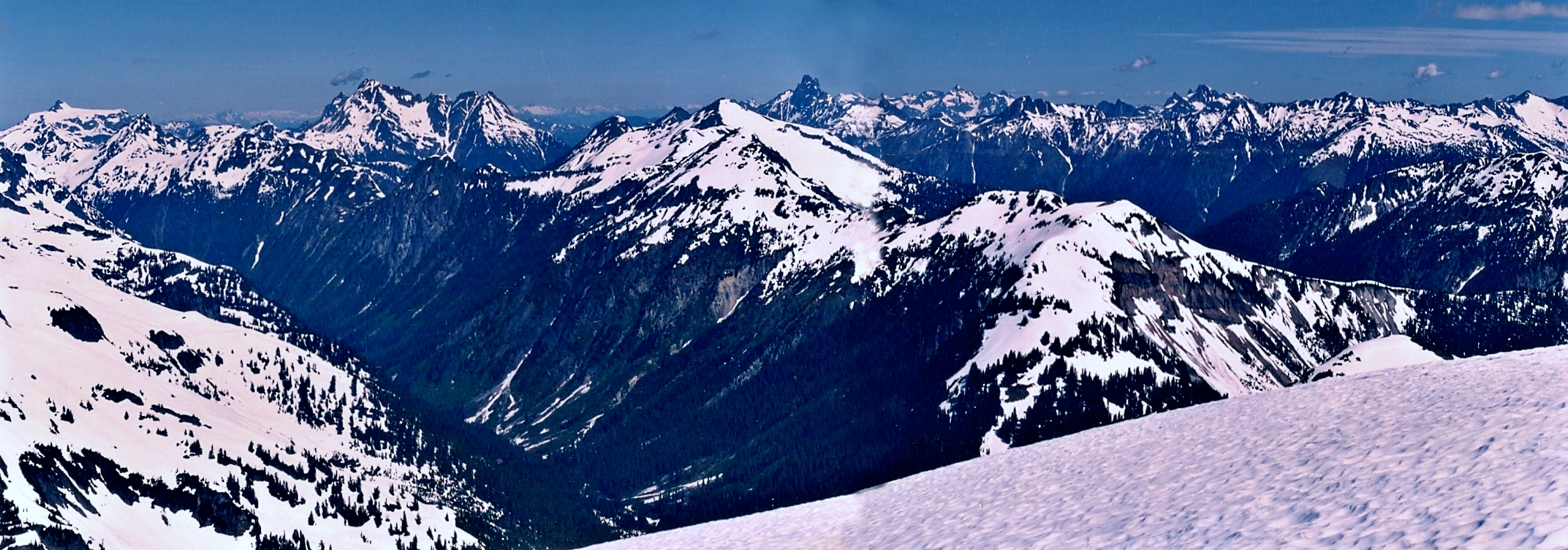
Ruth Mountain summit vista. Peaks include Tomyhoi Peak, Mount Larrabee, Mount Chardonnay, Slesse Mountain, Hannegan Peak, and Mount Rexford

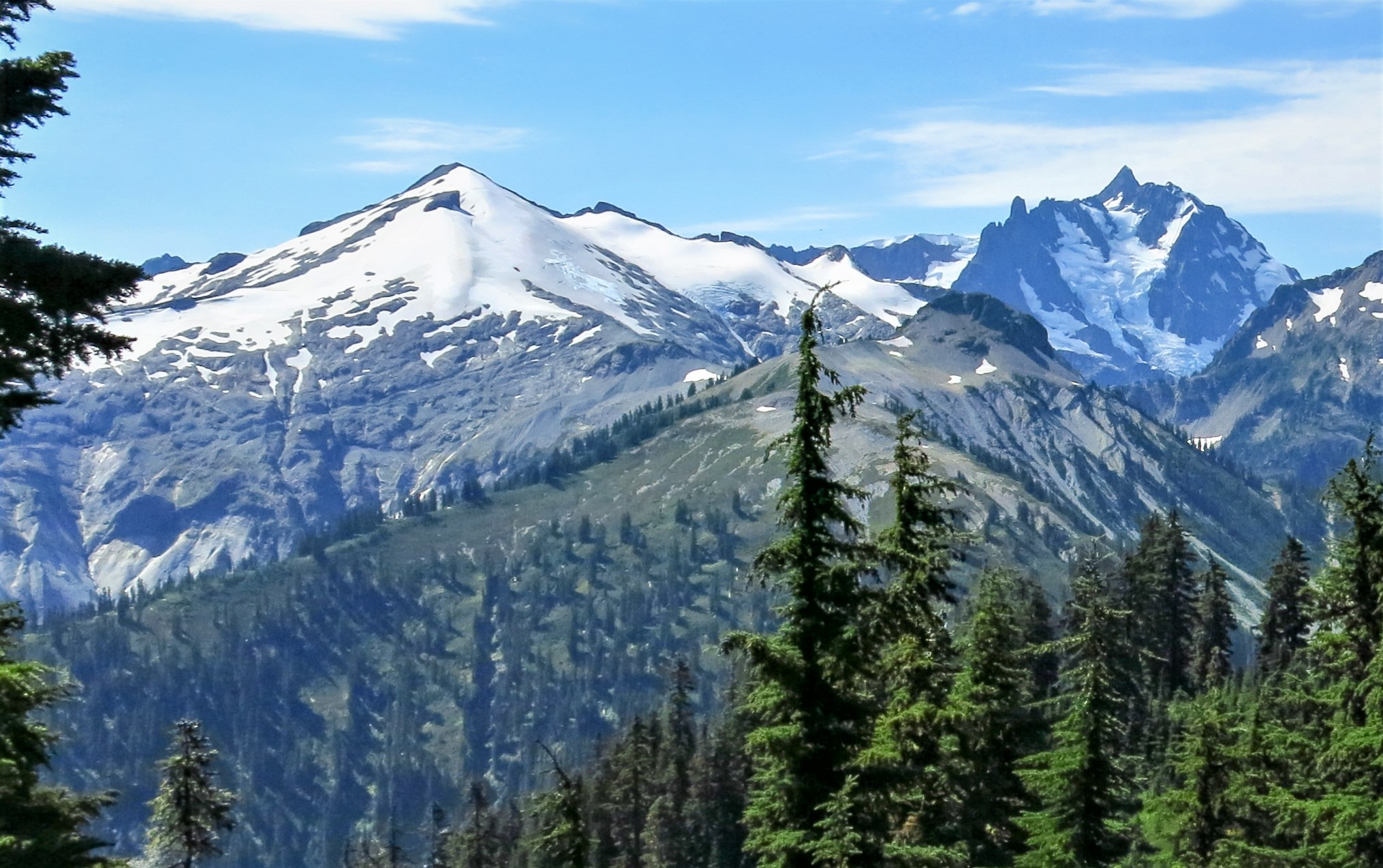
Ruth and Shuksan
