= Mineral Mountain (North Cascades National Park) =

Mountain in Washington (state), United States

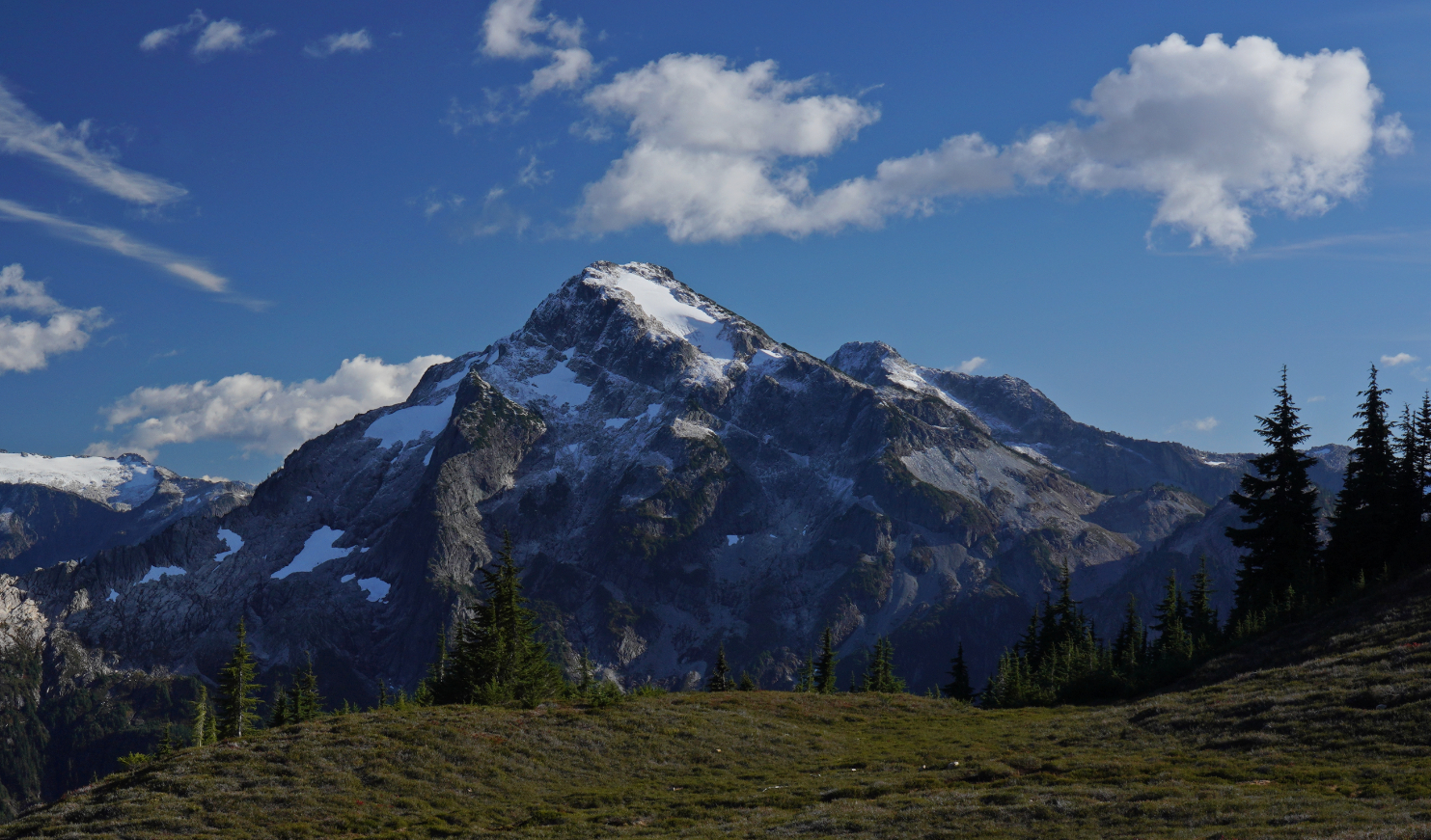
- Mineral Mountain seen from Copper Ridge

Highest point
- Elevation: 6,800+ ft (2,070+ m)
- Prominence: 2,080 ft (630 m)
- Parent peak: Ruth Mountain (7,115 ft)
- Isolation: 3.15 mi (5.07 km)
- Coordinates: 48°51′35″N 121°27′49″W

Geography
- Location within Washington (state) Location within the United States
- Interactive map of Mineral Mountain
- Country: United States
- State: Washington
- County: Whatcom
- Protected area: North Cascades National Park
- Parent range: Cascade Range; North Cascades; Skagit Range
- Topo map: USGS Mount Blum

Climbing
- Easiest route: Scramble

Mineral Mountain is a 6,800-foot (2,100-metre) mountain summit in the Skagit Range of the North Cascades of Washington state. Mineral Mountain is situated in North Cascades National Park and the summit offers views of Mount Shuksan, Icy Peak, and the Picket Range. Easy Peak is set 2 mi (3.2 km) to the east, and the nearest higher neighbor is Ruth Mountain, 3.06 mi (4.92 km) to the west. Precipitation runoff from Mineral Mountain finds its way north into the Chilliwack River, and south into the Baker River.

== Climate ==
Mineral Mountain is located in the marine west coast climate zone of western North America. Weather fronts originating in the Pacific Ocean typically move northeast toward the Cascade Mountains. As fronts approach the North Cascades, they are forced upward by the peaks of the Cascade Range (orographic lift), causing them to drop their moisture in the form of rain or snowfall onto the Cascades. As a result, the west side of the North Cascades experiences high precipitation, especially during the winter months in the form of snowfall. Because of maritime influence, snow tends to be wet and heavy, resulting in high avalanche danger. During winter months, weather is usually cloudy, but, due to high pressure systems over the Pacific Ocean that intensify during summer months, there is often little or no cloud cover during the summer. The months July through September offer the most favorable weather for viewing or climbing this peak.

== Geology ==
The North Cascades features some of the most rugged topography in the Cascade Range with craggy peaks, ridges, and deep glacial valleys. Geological events occurring many years ago created the diverse topography and drastic elevation changes over the Cascade Range leading to the various climate differences. These climate differences lead to vegetation variety defining the ecoregions in this area.

The history of the formation of the Cascade Mountains dates back millions of years ago to the late Eocene Epoch. With the North American Plate overriding the Pacific Plate, episodes of volcanic igneous activity persisted. In addition, small fragments of the oceanic and continental lithosphere called terranes created the North Cascades about 50 million years ago.

During the Pleistocene period dating back over two million years ago, glaciation advancing and retreating repeatedly scoured the landscape leaving deposits of rock debris. The U-shaped cross section of the river valleys is a result of recent glaciation. Uplift and faulting in combination with glaciation have been the dominant processes which have created the tall peaks and deep valleys of the North Cascades area.

== Gallery ==
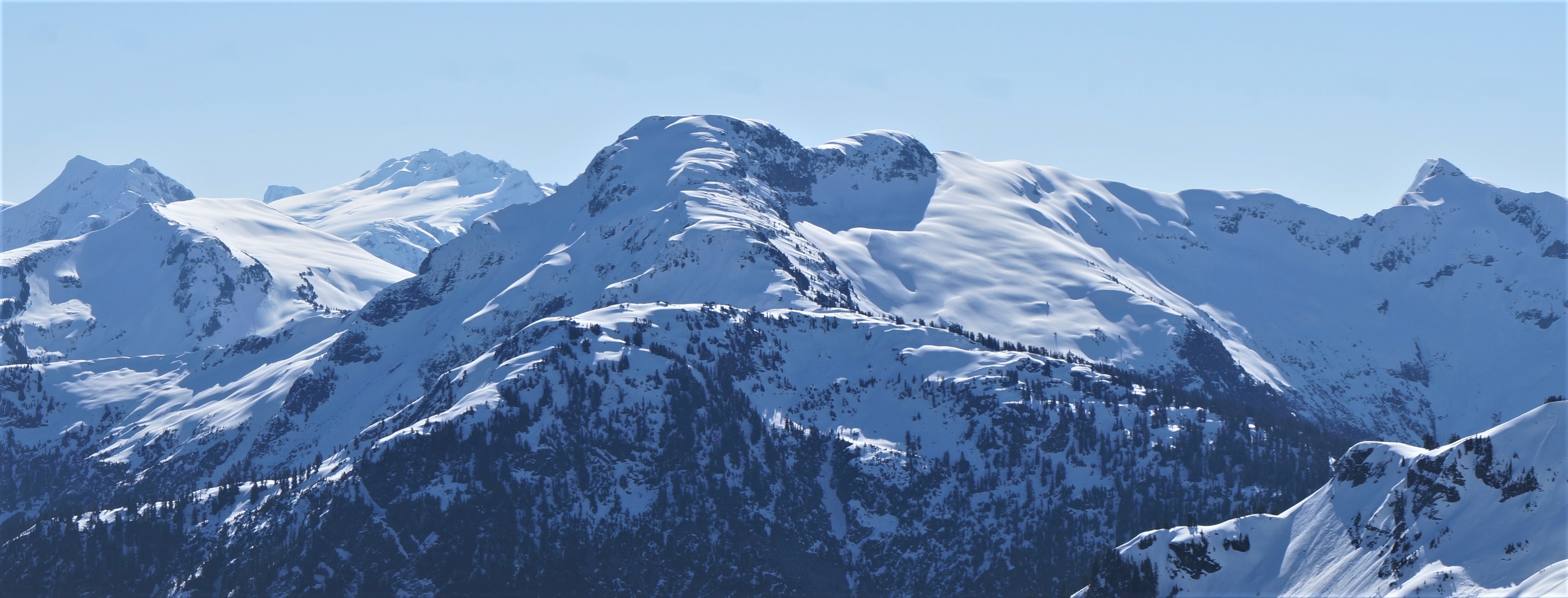
Mineral from WNW near Ruth Mountain

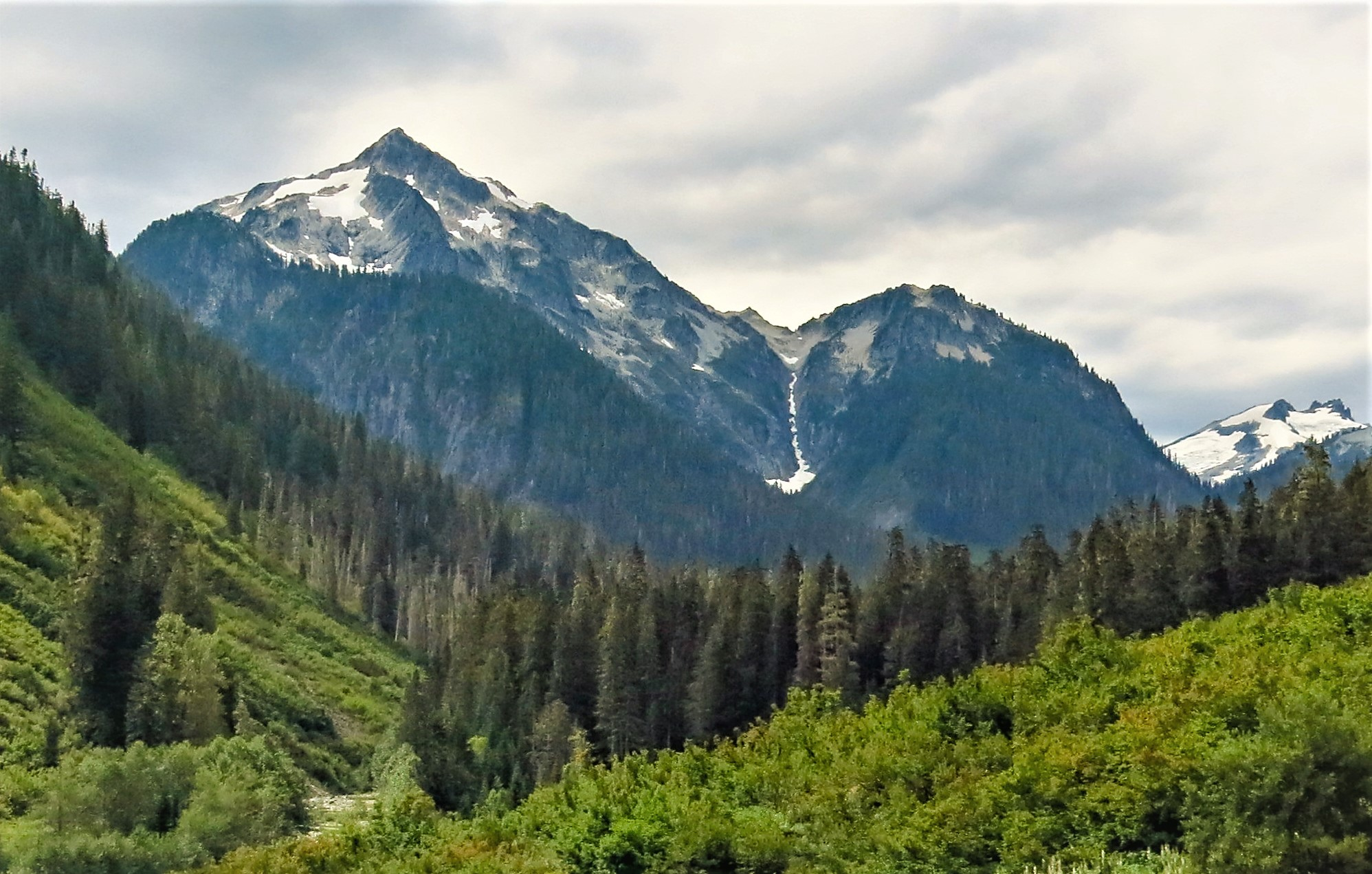
Northeast aspect, from Chilliwack River valley

== See also ==
- Geography of the North Cascades
- Geology of the Pacific Northwest
