= West Nooksack Glacier =

Glacier in the state of Washington

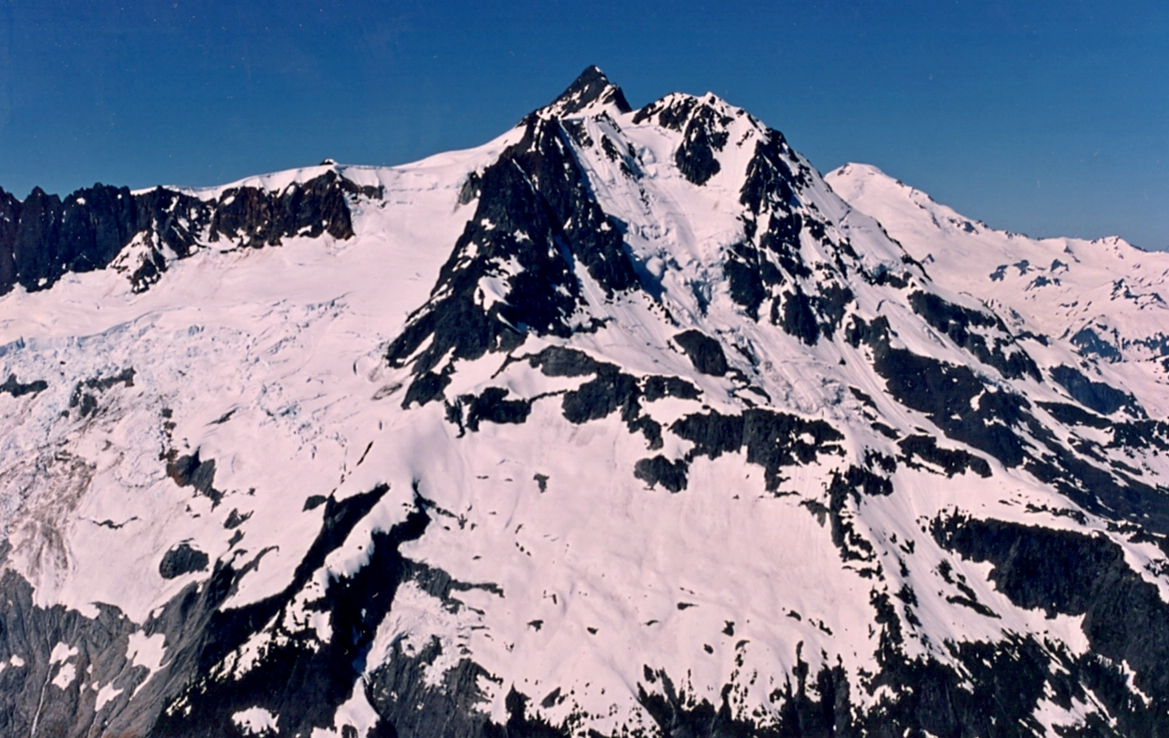
- West Nooksack Glacier in the lower foreground below Nooksack Tower

- Location within Washington (state)
- Type: Mountain glacier
- Location: Whatcom County, Washington, U.S.
- Coordinates: 48°50′31″N 121°34′30″W
- Length: .70 mi (1.13 km)
- Terminus: Barren rock/icefall
- Status: Retreating

West Nooksack Glacier is in North Cascades National Park in the U.S. state of Washington, on the eastern slopes of Mount Shuksan, immediately northeast of the subpeak called Nooksack Tower. West Nooksack Glacier is only .10 mi (0.16 km) in length and is a glacial remnant. West Nooksack Glacier provides meltwater for the Nooksack River.

== See also ==
- List of glaciers in the United States
