= Twin Sisters Mountain =

Multi-peak mountain in Washington State, U.S.

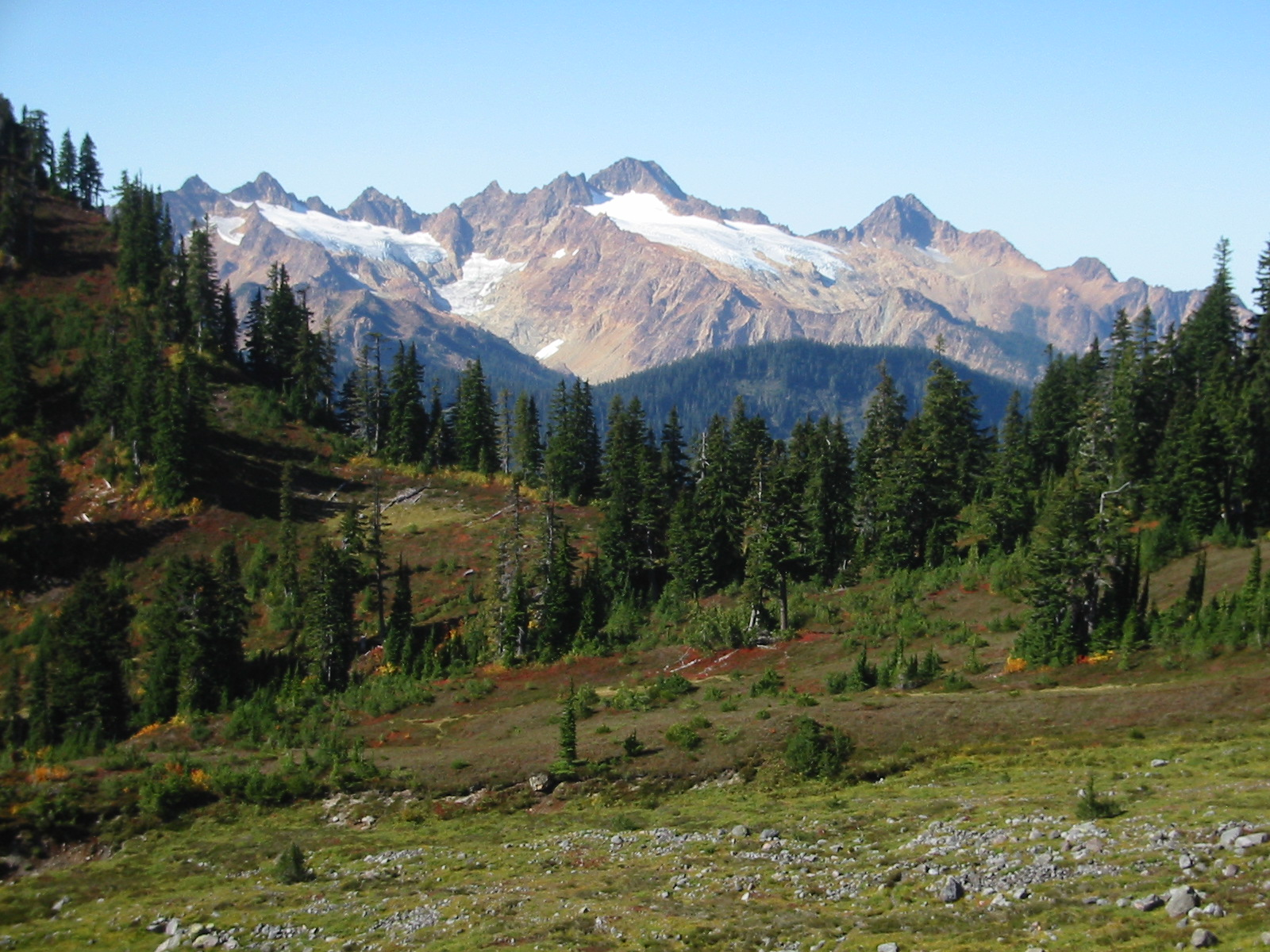
- As seen from southern flank of Mount Baker

Highest point
- Elevation: 7,000+ feet (2,130+ m)
- Prominence: 3,520 ft (1,070 m)
- Coordinates: 48°42′16″N 121°59′15″W

Geography
- Location within Washington (state)
- Interactive map of Twin Sisters Mountain
- Location: Whatcom County, Washington, U.S.
- Parent range: Cascade Range
- Topo map: USGS Twin Sisters Mountain

Geology
- Mountain type: Igneous dunite

Twin Sisters Mountain (Nooksack: Kwetl’kwítl’ Smánit, "red mountain"), commonly called the Twin Sisters, is a mountain in the U.S. state of Washington. Part of the Cascade Range, it lies just southwest of Mount Baker. Of its two main peaks, South Twin is higher, with a summit elevation above 7,004 feet (2,135 m). (Note: Peakbagger.com lists the NAVD 88 summit elevation of South Twin between 7004 ft. and 7044 ft) The summit of North Twin is above 6,644 feet (2,025 m). (Note: Peakbagger.com lists the NAVD 88 summit elevation of North Twin between 6644 ft. and 6684 ft.) There are several glaciers on the northeast slopes of Twin Sisters Mountain.

== Geography ==
Both of the summits are located within Mount Baker Wilderness. Twin Sisters Mountain as a whole is located southwest of Mount Baker, separated from the volcano by the Middle Fork of the Nooksack River. The South Fork Nooksack River flows around the eastern end of Twin Sisters Mountain. Other streams that drain Twin Sisters Mountain include Skookum Creek, Sister Creek, Green Creek, and Howard Creek. All the streams eventually end up in the Nooksack River.

== Geology ==
Twin Sisters Mountain is composed of relatively unaltered dunite, an ultramafic rock that is mostly olivine. The Twin Sisters Range is a massive slab of relatively dense rock that was uplifted from major thrust fault activity in the form of a nappe. The magnesium and iron rich rock was forced upwards from the tectonic collision between the Bell Pass Mélange and the Chilliwack River terrane during the Mesozoic era. The reddish color of the mountain range may be due to the oxidation of iron and magnesium in the dunite that is exposed to chemical weathering. Petrology of the Twin Sisters dunite consists of Enstatite rich rocks that contain, along with olivine, significant amounts of chromite, clinopyroxene, and serpentinite. These minerals are commonly associated with ultramafic rocks that crystallize below the Earth's crust within the mantle (geology). The serpentinized minerals are thought to have formed during later stages of the uplift where water could penetrate through fault fractures and initiate metamorphism.

== Climate ==
Twin Sisters are located in the marine west coast climate zone of western North America. Most weather fronts originate in the Pacific Ocean, and travel northeast toward the Cascade Mountains. As fronts approach the North Cascades, they are forced upward by the peaks of the Cascade Range (Orographic lift), causing them to drop their moisture in the form of rain or snowfall onto the Cascades. As a result, the west side of the North Cascades experiences high precipitation, especially during the winter months in the form of snowfall. During winter months, weather is usually cloudy, but, due to high pressure systems over the Pacific Ocean that intensify during summer months, there is often little or no cloud cover during the summer Because of maritime influence, snow tends to be wet and heavy, resulting in high avalanche danger.

== Gallery ==
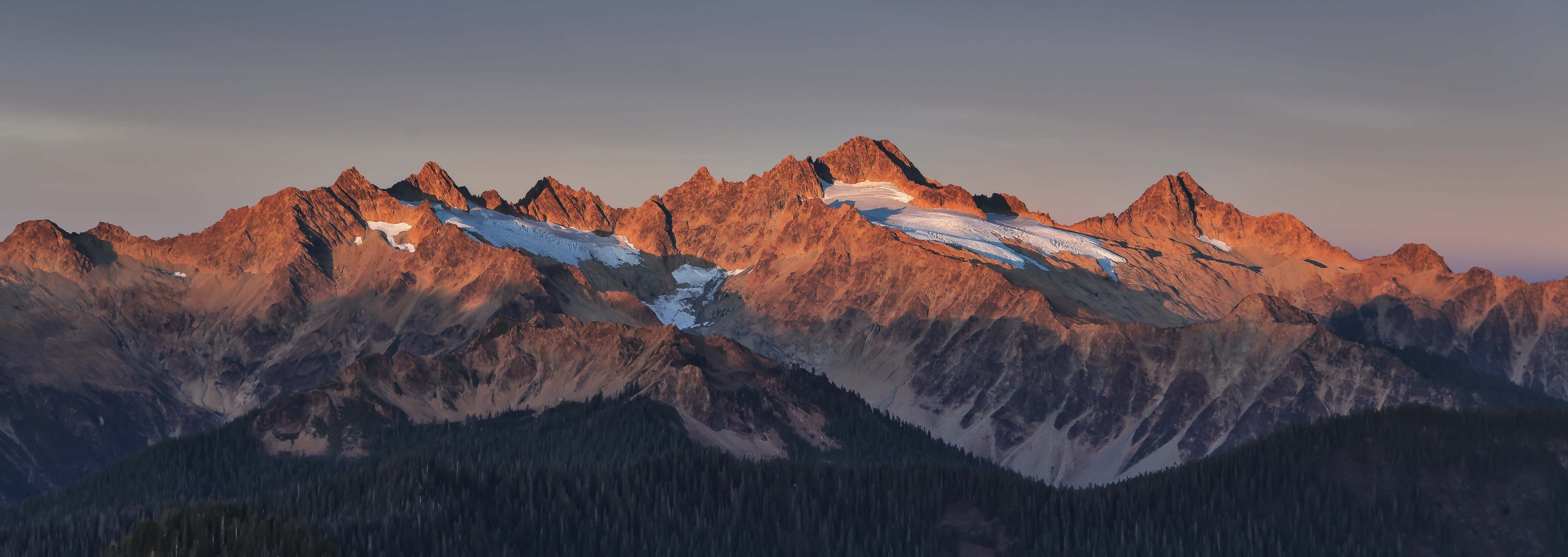
Twin Sisters range

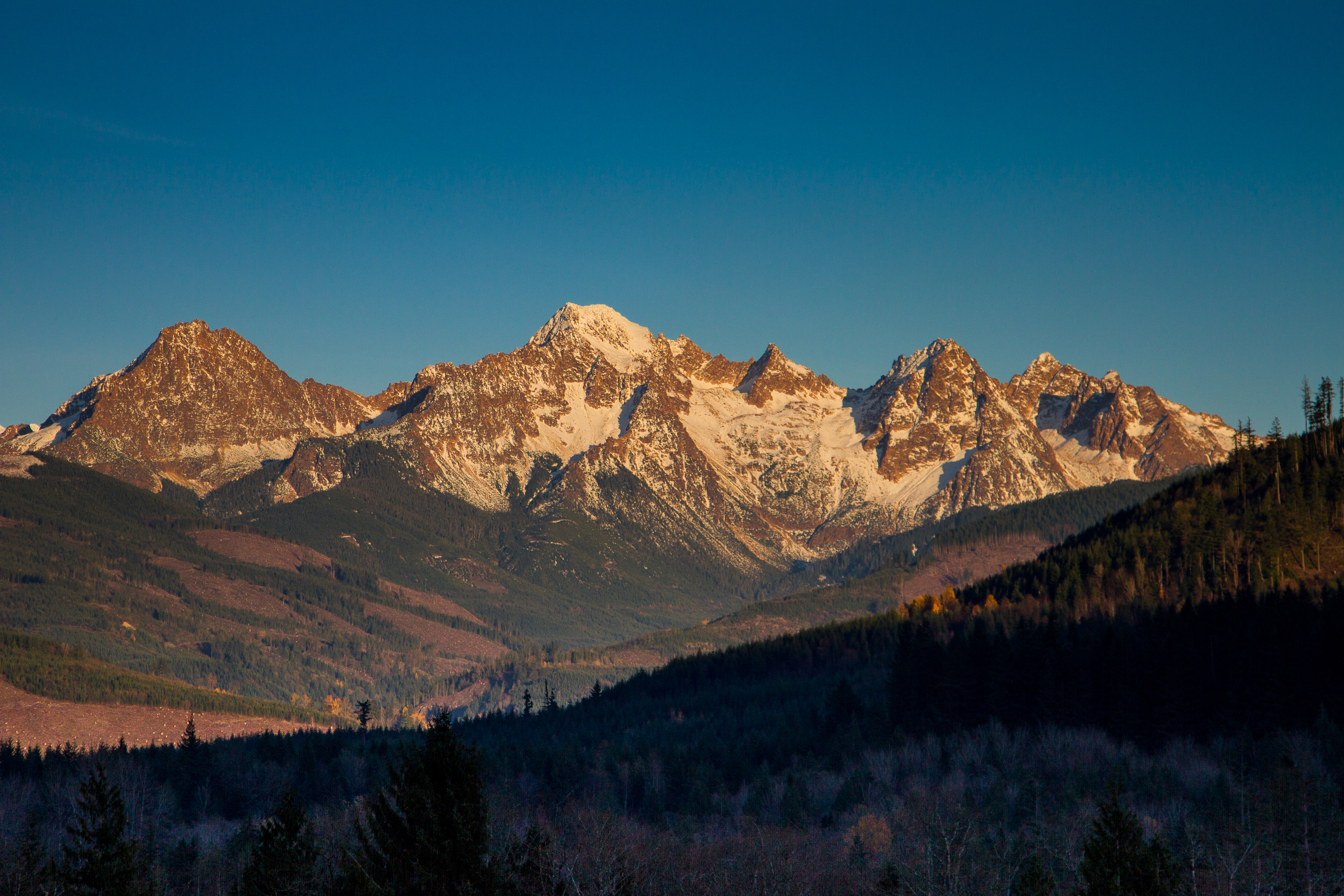
Twin Sisters west aspect

View of east face of the mountain from Crag View with unofficial names used in the climbing community

Twin Sisters from Ferndale, next to Mount Baker
