= Icy Peak =

Mountain in Washington (state), United States

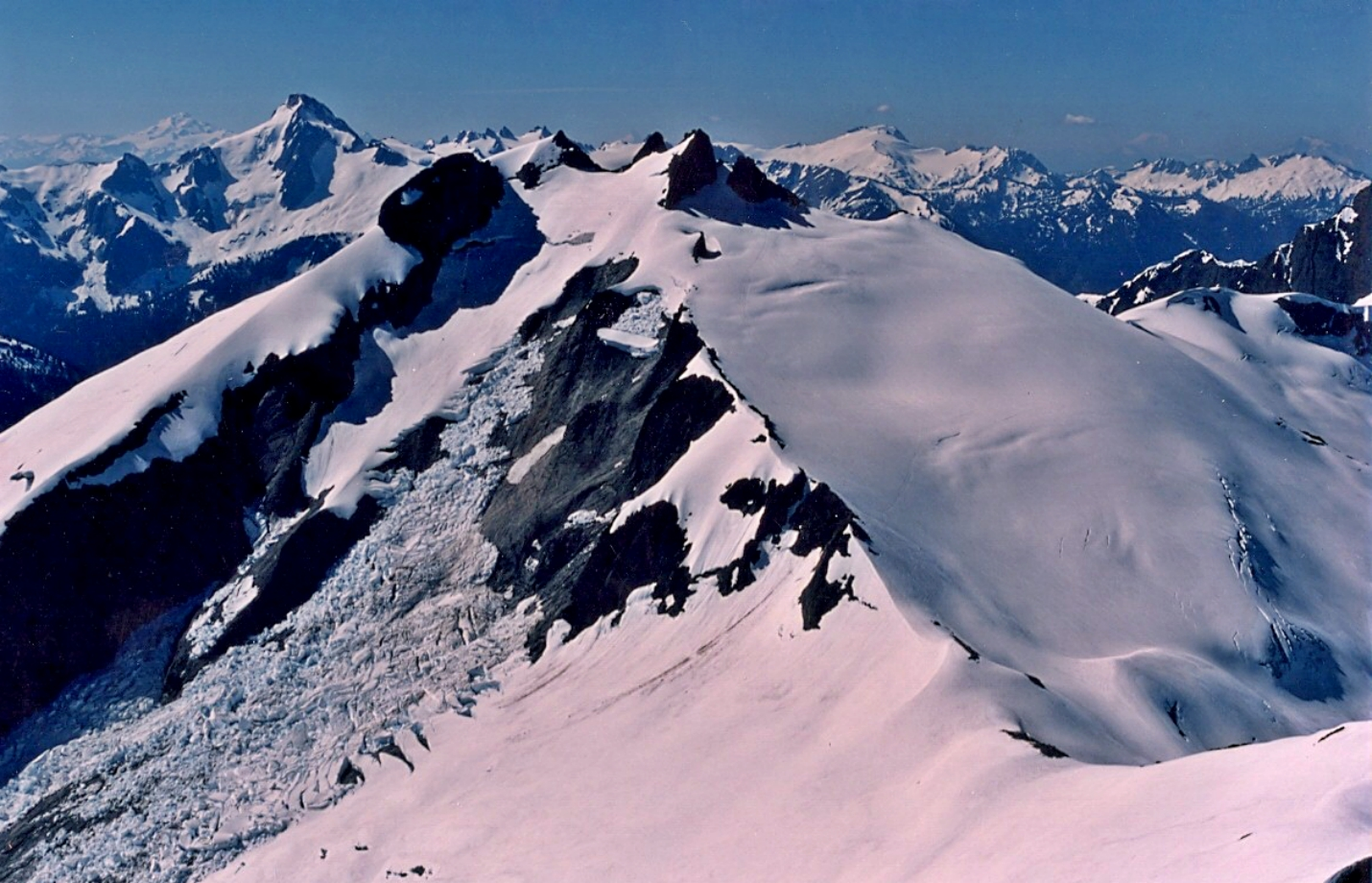
- Icy Peak seen from Ruth Mountain

Highest point
- Elevation: 7,073 ft (2,156 m)
- Prominence: 1,315 ft (401 m)
- Parent peak: Seahpo Peak (7,441 ft)
- Isolation: 1.54 mi (2.48 km)
- Coordinates: 48°50′08″N 121°31′32″W

Geography
- Location within Washington (state) Location within the United States
- Interactive map of Icy Peak
- Country: United States
- State: Washington
- County: Whatcom
- Protected area: North Cascades National Park
- Parent range: North Cascades
- Topo map: USGS Mount Shuksan

Climbing
- Easiest route: Climbing, class 4, Glacier travel

Icy Peak is a 7,073-foot (2,156-metre) Skagit Range mountain summit located in the North Cascades of Washington state. It is situated in North Cascades National Park at the head of Nooksack Cirque. High ridges connect it to Seahpo Peak and Mount Shuksan. An icefall occupies the northeast cirque, and small glaciers clad all sides of the peak. Precipitation runoff drains into the Nooksack and Baker Rivers.

== Climate ==
Icy Peak is located in the marine west coast climate zone of western North America. Weather fronts originating in the Pacific Ocean travel northeast toward the Cascade Mountains. As fronts approach the North Cascades, they are forced upward by the peaks of the Cascade Range (orographic lift), causing them to drop their moisture in the form of rain or snowfall onto the Cascades. As a result, the west side of the North Cascades experiences high precipitation, especially during the winter months in the form of snowfall. Because of maritime influence, snow tends to be wet and heavy, resulting in high avalanche danger. During winter months, weather is usually cloudy, but due to high pressure systems over the Pacific Ocean that intensify during summer months, there is often little or no cloud cover during the summer. The months July through September offer the most favorable weather for viewing or climbing this peak.

== Geology ==
The North Cascades features some of the most rugged topography in the Cascade Range with craggy peaks, ridges, and deep glacial valleys. Geological events occurring many years ago created the diverse topography and drastic elevation changes over the Cascade Range leading to the various climate differences. These climate differences lead to vegetation variety defining the ecoregions in this area.

The history of the formation of the Cascade Mountains dates back millions of years ago to the late Eocene Epoch. With the North American Plate overriding the Pacific Plate, episodes of volcanic igneous activity persisted. In addition, small fragments of the oceanic and continental lithosphere called terranes created the North Cascades about 50 million years ago.

During the Pleistocene period dating back over two million years ago, glaciation advancing and retreating repeatedly scoured the landscape leaving deposits of rock debris. The U-shaped cross section of the river valleys is a result of recent glaciation. Uplift and faulting in combination with glaciation have been the dominant processes which have created the tall peaks and deep valleys of the North Cascades area.

Icy Peak is a remnant of the Hannegan Caldera, a large extinct volcano.

== Gallery ==
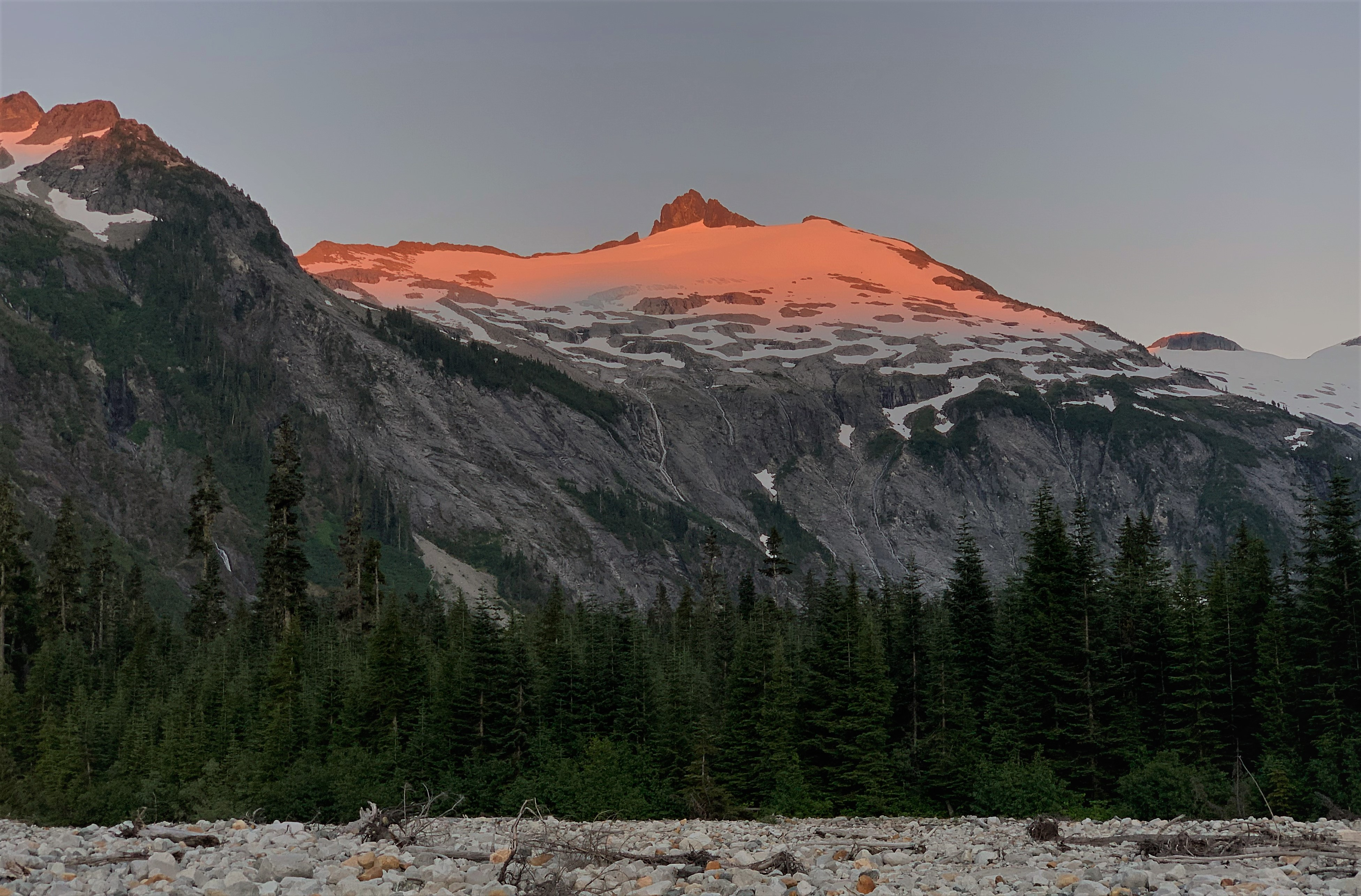
Alpenglow on west aspect of Icy Peak, as seen from Nooksack Cirque at sunset

Spillway Glacier on Icy Peak

== See also ==
- Geography of the North Cascades
- Geology of the Pacific Northwest
