= Seahpo Peak =

Mountain in Washington, United States

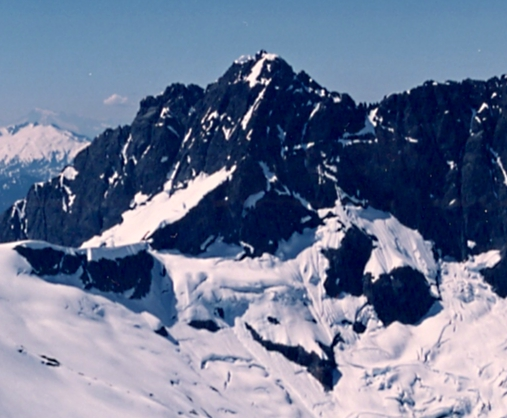
- Seahpo Peak

Highest point
- Elevation: 7,313 ft (2,229 m)
- Coordinates: 48°49′10″N 121°32′55″W

Geography
- Location: Whatcom County, Washington, U.S.
- Parent range: North Cascades
- Topo map: USGS Mount Shuksan

Geology
- Rock age: Cretaceous
- Mountain type: Shuksan greenschist

Seahpo Peak is a subsidiary peak of Mount Shuksan, which rises in the U.S. state of Washington. It is located about 2 miles (3.2 km) east of the main peak of Shuksan and rises to about 7,441 feet (2,268 m). It is located in North Cascades National Park and is part of the North Cascades range.

Connected to the main peak by the roughly 7,000-foot (2,100 m)-high Jagged Ridge, Seahpo Peak stands to the north at the headwaters of a headstream of Sulphide Creek, a tributary of the Baker River. Several waterfalls tumble off its flanks, including Seahpo Peak Falls and Cloudcap Falls. (Seahpo Peak is sometimes referred to as Cloudcap Peak.) The mountain is also on the south side of the Nooksack Cirque, which forms the headwaters of the Nooksack River. It is bordered by the East Nooksack Glacier to the north and a few smaller unnamed glaciers to the south. It is also connected to Icy Peak by another unnamed ridge.

The mountain derives its name from a French word, chapeau, meaning "hat".

== Geology ==
The North Cascades features some of the most rugged topography in the Cascade Range with craggy peaks, ridges, and deep glacial valleys. Geological events occurring many years ago created the diverse topography and drastic elevation changes over the Cascade Range leading to the various climate differences. These climate differences lead to vegetation variety defining the ecoregions in this area.

The history of the formation of the Cascade Mountains dates back millions of years ago to the late Eocene Epoch. With the North American Plate overriding the Pacific Plate, episodes of volcanic igneous activity persisted. In addition, small fragments of the oceanic and continental lithosphere called terranes created the North Cascades about 50 million years ago.

During the Pleistocene period dating back over two million years ago, glaciation advancing and retreating repeatedly scoured the landscape leaving deposits of rock debris. The U-shaped cross section of the river valleys is a result of recent glaciation. Uplift and faulting in combination with glaciation have been the dominant processes which have created the tall peaks and deep valleys of the North Cascades area.

== Climate ==
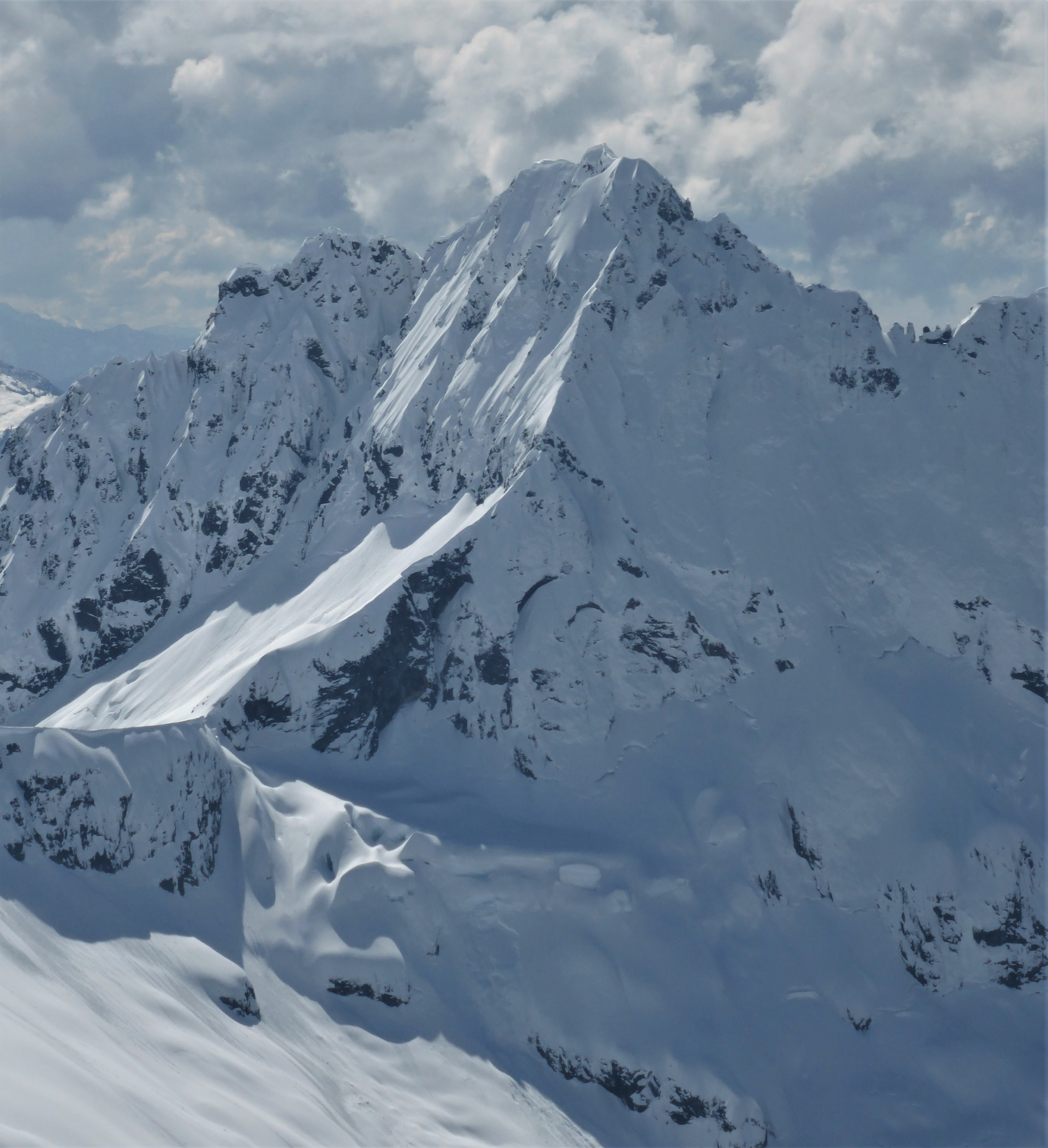
Seapho from Ruth Mountain

Seahpo Peak is located in the marine west coast climate zone of western North America. Most weather fronts originate in the Pacific Ocean, and travel northeast toward the Cascade Mountains. As fronts approach the North Cascades, they are forced upward by the peaks of the Cascade Range, causing them to drop their moisture in the form of rain or snowfall onto the Cascades. As a result, the west side of the North Cascades experiences high precipitation, especially during the winter months in the form of snowfall. During winter months, weather is usually cloudy, but, due to high pressure systems over the Pacific Ocean that intensify during summer months, there is often little or no cloud cover during the summer. Because of maritime influence, snow tends to be wet and heavy, resulting in high avalanche danger.

== See also ==
- Geography of the North Cascades
- Geology of the Pacific Northwest
