= Nooksack Tower =

Mountain in Washington (state), United States

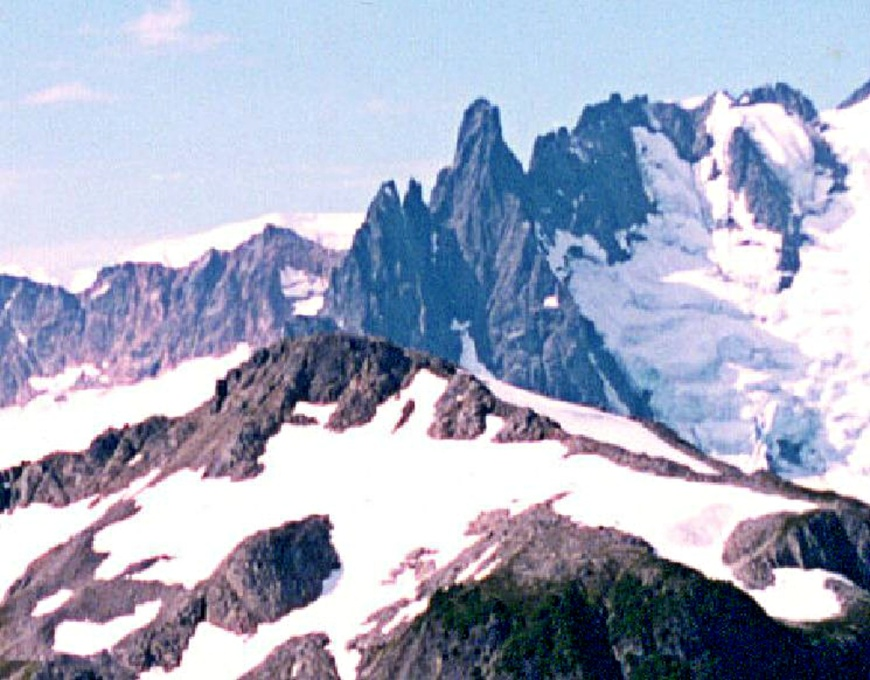
- Nooksack Tower from Hannegan Peak

Highest point
- Elevation: 8,285 ft (2,525 m)
- Prominence: 325 ft (99 m)
- Coordinates: 48°50′11″N 121°35′12″W

Geography
- Location within Washington (state) Location within the United States
- Location: Whatcom County, Washington, U.S.
- Parent range: Cascade Range
- Topo map: USGS Mount Shuksan

Climbing
- First ascent: 1946 Fred Beckey
- Easiest route: class 4-5.4

Nooksack Tower (8,285 feet (2,525 m)) is in North Cascades National Park in the U.S. state of Washington. Nooksack Tower is part of the Mount Shuksan Massif and is .75 mi (1.21 km) northeast of the main summit of Shuksan. Nooksack Tower looms to the west over Nooksack Cirque. The East Nooksack Glacier lies to the southeast, West Nooksack Glacier to the east and Price Glacier is on the north flanks of the tower. Nooksack Tower is one of the most difficult mountains to climb in the Cascade Range, with loose rock, 50-degree or greater slopes and ice ridges as well as accessibility issues and exposure, all weighing into the climbing equation. The descent may require ten or more rappels.

== Climate ==
Nooksack Tower is located in the marine west coast climate zone of western North America. Most weather fronts originate in the Pacific Ocean, and travel northeast toward the Cascade Mountains.

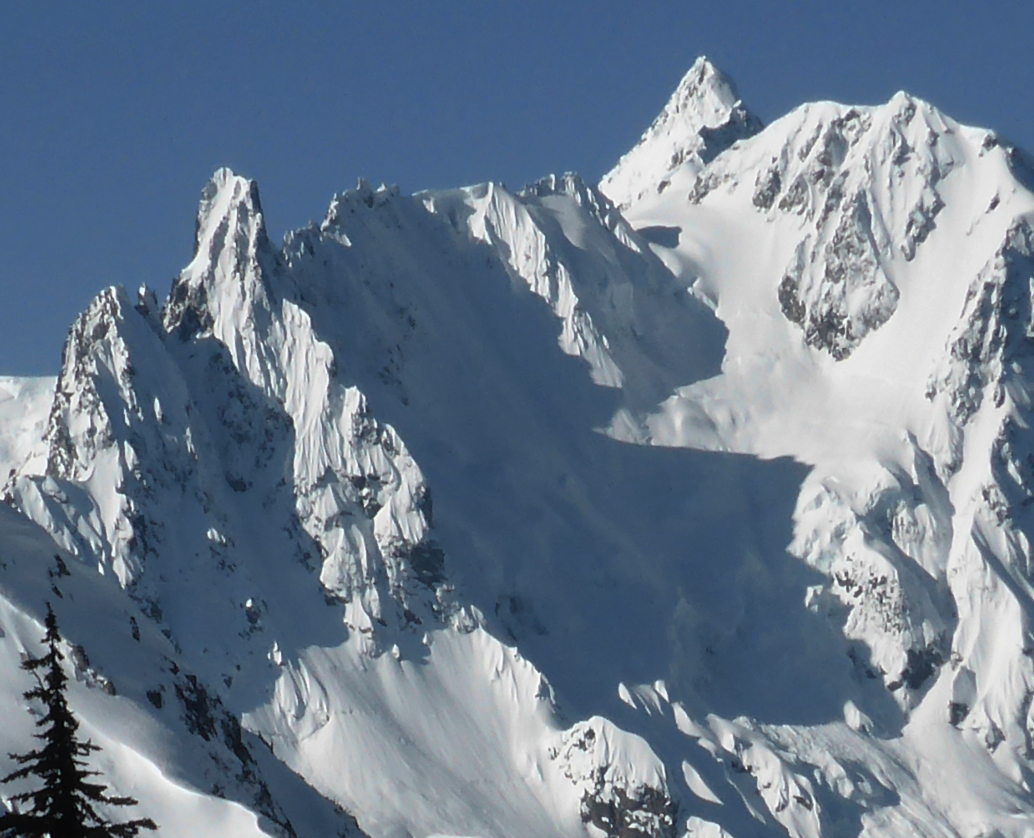
Nooksack Tower (left) and Shuksan's summit

As fronts approach the North Cascades, they are forced upward by the peaks of the Cascade Range, causing them to drop their moisture in the form of rain or snowfall onto the Cascades (Orographic lift). As a result, the west side of the North Cascades experiences high precipitation, especially during the winter months in the form of snowfall. Due to its temperate climate and proximity to the Pacific Ocean, areas west of the Cascade Crest very rarely experience temperatures below 0 °F (−18 °C) or above 80 °F (27 °C). During winter months, weather is usually cloudy, but, due to high pressure systems over the Pacific Ocean that intensify during summer months, there is often little or no cloud cover during the summer. Because of maritime influence, snow tends to be wet and heavy, resulting in high avalanche danger.

== Geology ==
The North Cascades features some of the most rugged topography in the Cascade Range with craggy peaks, spires, ridges, and deep glacial valleys. The history of the formation of the Cascade Mountains dates back millions of years ago to the late Eocene Epoch. Small fragments of the oceanic and continental lithosphere called terranes created the North Cascades about 50 million years ago.

During the Pleistocene period dating back over two million years ago, glaciation advancing and retreating repeatedly scoured the landscape leaving deposits of rock debris. The U-shaped cross section of the river valleys is a result of recent glaciation. Uplift and faulting in combination with glaciation have been the dominant processes which have created the tall peaks and deep valleys of the North Cascades area.
