= Mount Shuksan Waterfalls =

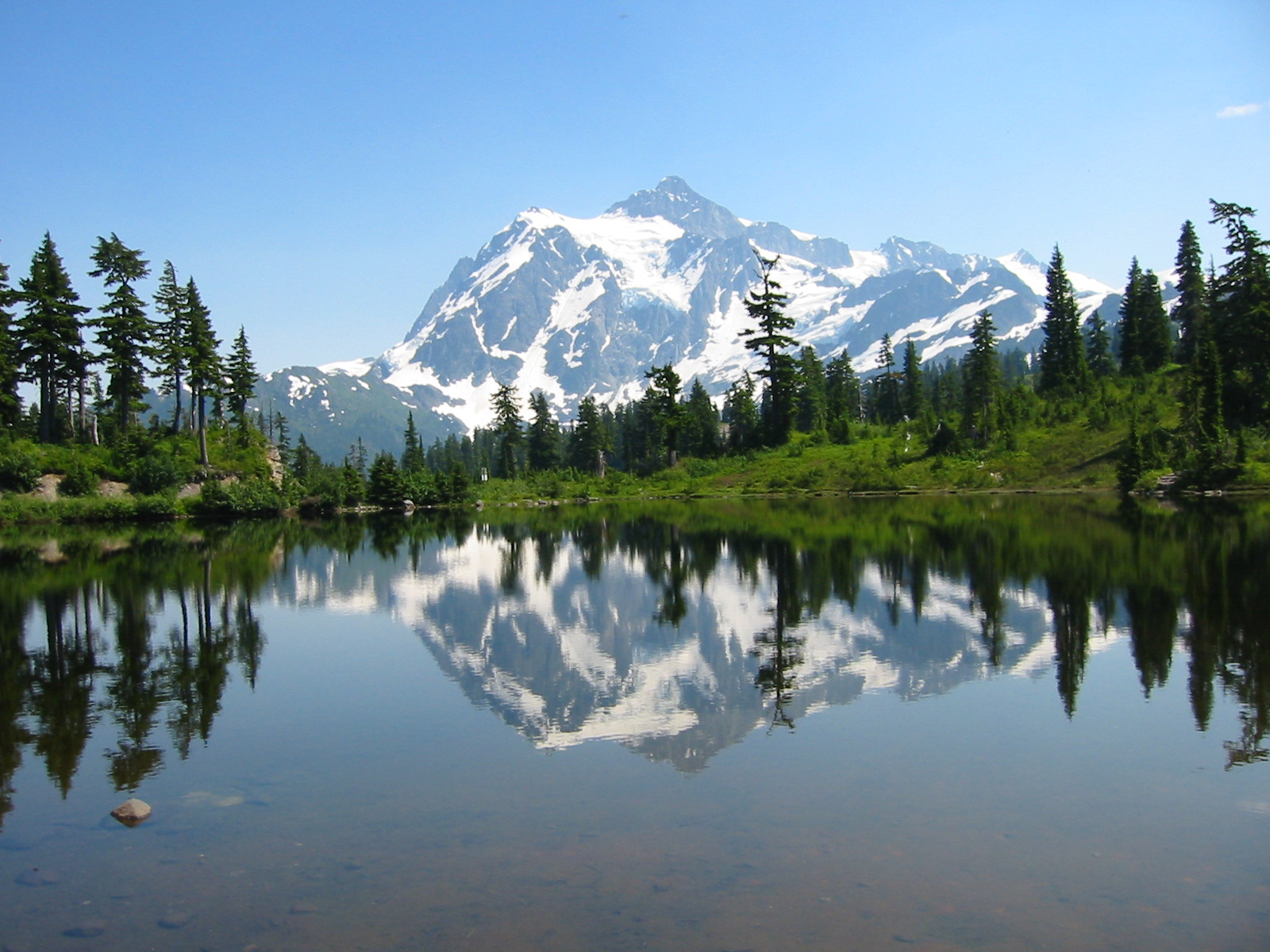
Mount Shuksan

There are four prominent waterfalls in the basin of a short tributary of Sulphide Creek, on the southeast flank of 9,127-foot (2,781m) Mount Shuksan in North Cascades National Park, Washington. Seahpo Peak Falls and Cloudcap Falls, the taller two of the three, are located on separate streams that converge and plunge over Rockflow Canyon Falls. The unnamed outlet stream from these waterfalls flows into Sulphide Creek, which flows into the Baker River. Another waterfall is Jagged Ridge Falls, on a tributary of the unnamed stream.

== Seahpo Peak Falls ==
Seahpo Peak Falls
- Interactive map of Seahpo Peak Falls
- Location: North Cascades National Park, Whatcom County, Washington, United States
- Type: Tiered
- Total height: 2,200 feet (670 m)
- Longest drop: 500 feet (150 m)
- Total width: 5 feet (1.5 m)
- Watercourse: Unnamed
- Average flow rate: 35 cubic feet per second (0.99 m^{3}/s)
- World height ranking: 36

Seahpo Peak Falls, at 48°48′49″N 121°33′02″W, is an intermittent waterfall on an unnamed glacial stream coming off Seahpo Peak. The largest (but not tallest) of the waterfalls on Mount Shuksan, it stands about 2,200 feet (670m) high and has 6 distinct tiers, the largest of which drops about 500 sheer feet (152m) .

It is located near the five waterfalls of Sulphide Basin.

Its name stems from a Chinook Jargon word meaning "cap".

== Cloudcap Falls ==
Cloudcap Falls
- Interactive map of Cloudcap Falls
- Location: North Cascades National Park, Whatcom County, Washington, United States
- Type: Cascade
- Total height: 2,400 feet (730 m)
- Total width: 5 feet (1.5 m)
- Watercourse: Unnamed
- Average flow rate: 30 cubic feet per second (0.85 m^{3}/s)
- World height ranking: 22

Cloudcap Falls, at 48°48′52″N 121°33′47″W, is a cascade that drops about 2,400 feet (731m) and runs 5000 feet (1524m) off Jagged Ridge near Mount Shuksan. Although it is slightly taller than Seahpo Peak Falls, it is more seasonal and has a smaller volume, and is essentially a long cascade that does not have any prominent vertical drops.

== Rockflow Canyon Falls ==
Rockflow Canyon Falls
- Interactive map of Rockflow Canyon Falls
- Location: North Cascades National Park, Whatcom County, Washington, United States
- Type: Segmented Horsetail
- Total height: 200 feet (61 m)
- Total width: 10 feet (3.0 m)
- Watercourse: Unnamed
- Average flow rate: 100 cubic feet per second (2.8 m^{3}/s)

Rockflow Canyon Falls, at 48°48′10″N 121°33′14″W, is a 200-foot (60m) horsetail located where the water from Seahpo Peak Falls and Cloudcap Falls converges. It is the final waterfall on the drainage before it empties into the Baker River. In some months it is seen in tandem with a seasonal waterfall of similar height.

== Jagged Ridge Falls ==
48°48′12″N 121°33′54″W

== See also ==
- List of waterfalls
- List of waterfalls by height
- Sulphide Creek Falls
