= Nooksack Cirque =

Cirque in the state of Washington

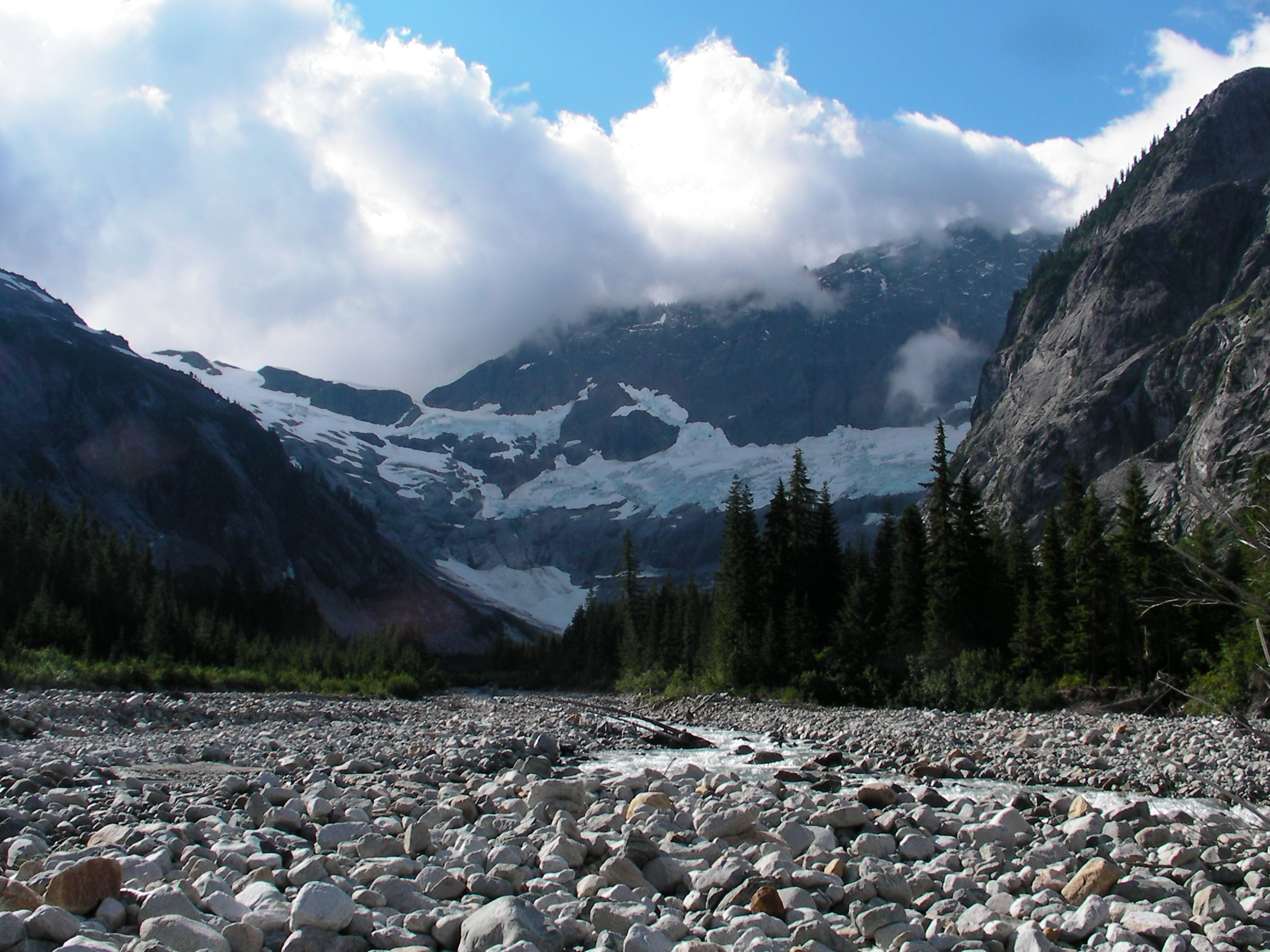
- Nooksack Cirque

- Location within Washington (state)
- Length: 1.5 mi (2.4 km)
- Width: 2.5 mi (4.0 km)
- Depth: 3,800 ft (1,200 m)

Geology
- Type: Glacial

Geography
- Location: North Cascades National Park, Whatcom County, Washington, U.S.
- Coordinates: 48°50′14″N 121°34′34″W
- Interactive map of Nooksack Cirque

Nooksack Cirque is in North Cascades National Park in the U.S. state of Washington, on the eastern slopes of Mount Shuksan. Nooksack Cirque was formed by glaciers and the East Nooksack Glacier is located in the cirque below the headwall known as Jagged Ridge. The cirque extends from a subpeak of Mount Shuksan called Nooksack Tower to Seahpo Peak, a distance of over 2 mi (3.2 km) in width. Nooksack Cirque streams and meltwater from the East Nooksack Glacier form the headwaters for the Nooksack River.
