= East Nooksack Glacier =

Glacier in the state of Washington

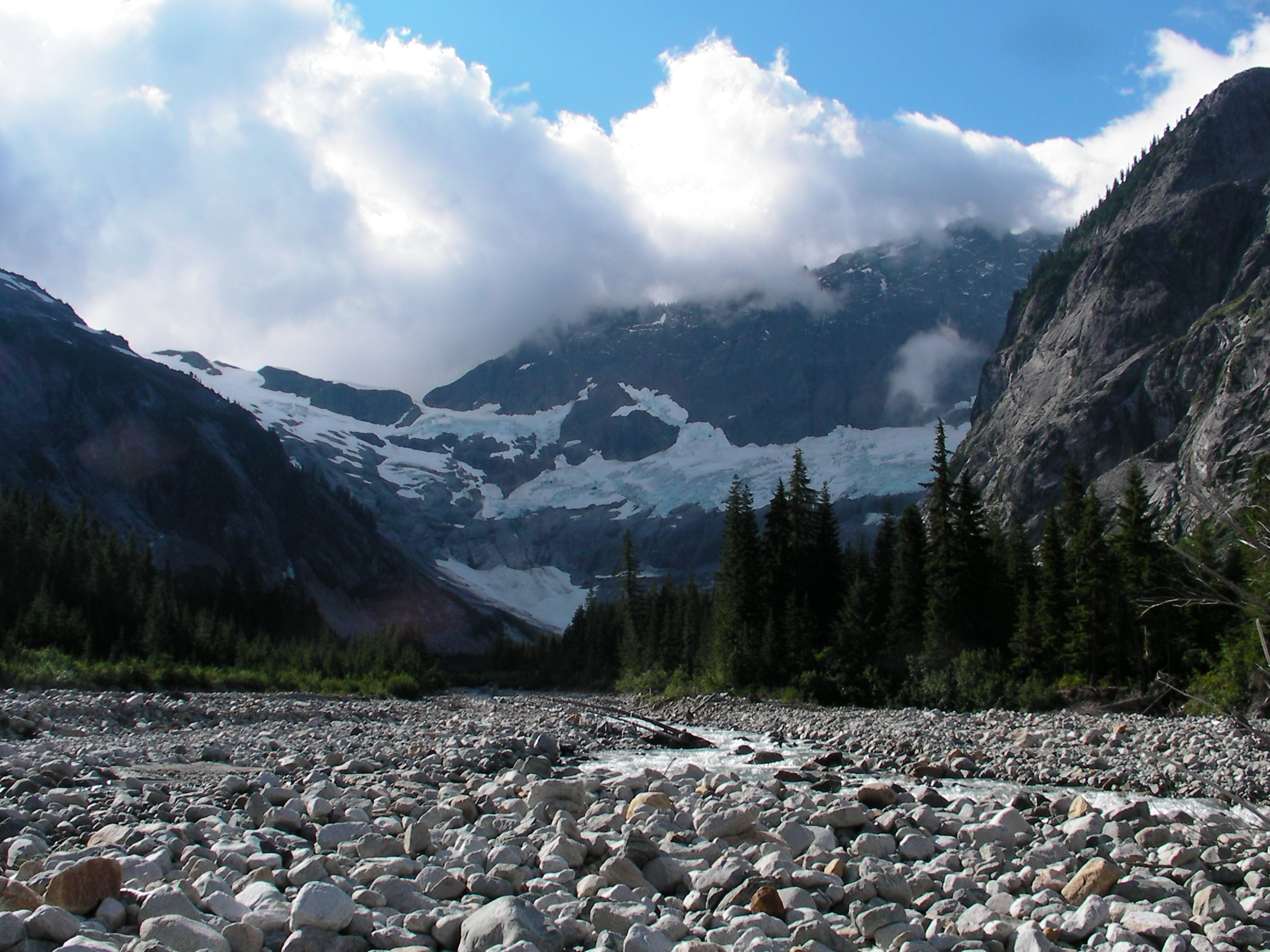
- East Nooksack Glacier

- Location within Washington (state)
- Type: Mountain glacier
- Location: Whatcom County, Washington, U.S.
- Coordinates: 48°49′43″N 121°33′52″W
- Length: .70 mi (1.13 km)
- Terminus: Barren rock/icefall
- Status: Retreating

East Nooksack Glacier is in North Cascades National Park in the U.S. state of Washington, on the eastern slopes of Mount Shuksan. East Nooksack Glacier is only 0.70 mi (1.13 km), but fills the upper portions of the Nooksack Cirque, spanning more than 2 mi (3.2 km). East Nooksack Glacier is connected to Crystal Glacier at its uppermost section at 7,800 ft (2,400 m). East Nooksack Glacier extends from Nooksack Tower to the northwest to Seahpo Peak to the southeast and meltwater from the glacier flows into the Nooksack River.

== See also ==
- List of glaciers in the United States
