= Welcome, Washington =

Unincorporated community in Washington, US

- Unincorporated community
- Location within Washington (state)
- Coordinates: 48°50′16″N 122°09′57″W
- Country: United States
- State: Washington
- County: Whatcom
- Established: 1889
- Elevation: 381 ft (116 m)
- Time zone: UTC-8 (Pacific (PST))
  - Summer (DST): UTC-7 (PDT)
- Area code(s): 360, 564
- GNIS feature ID: 1530573

Welcome is an unincorporated community in Whatcom County, in the U.S. state of Washington.

== History ==
A post office called Welcome was established in 1889, and remained in operation until 1917. John Welcome Riddle, an early postmaster, gave the community his middle name.
