= Nooksack River =

River in Washington state, United States

Nooksack River North Fork Nooksack River
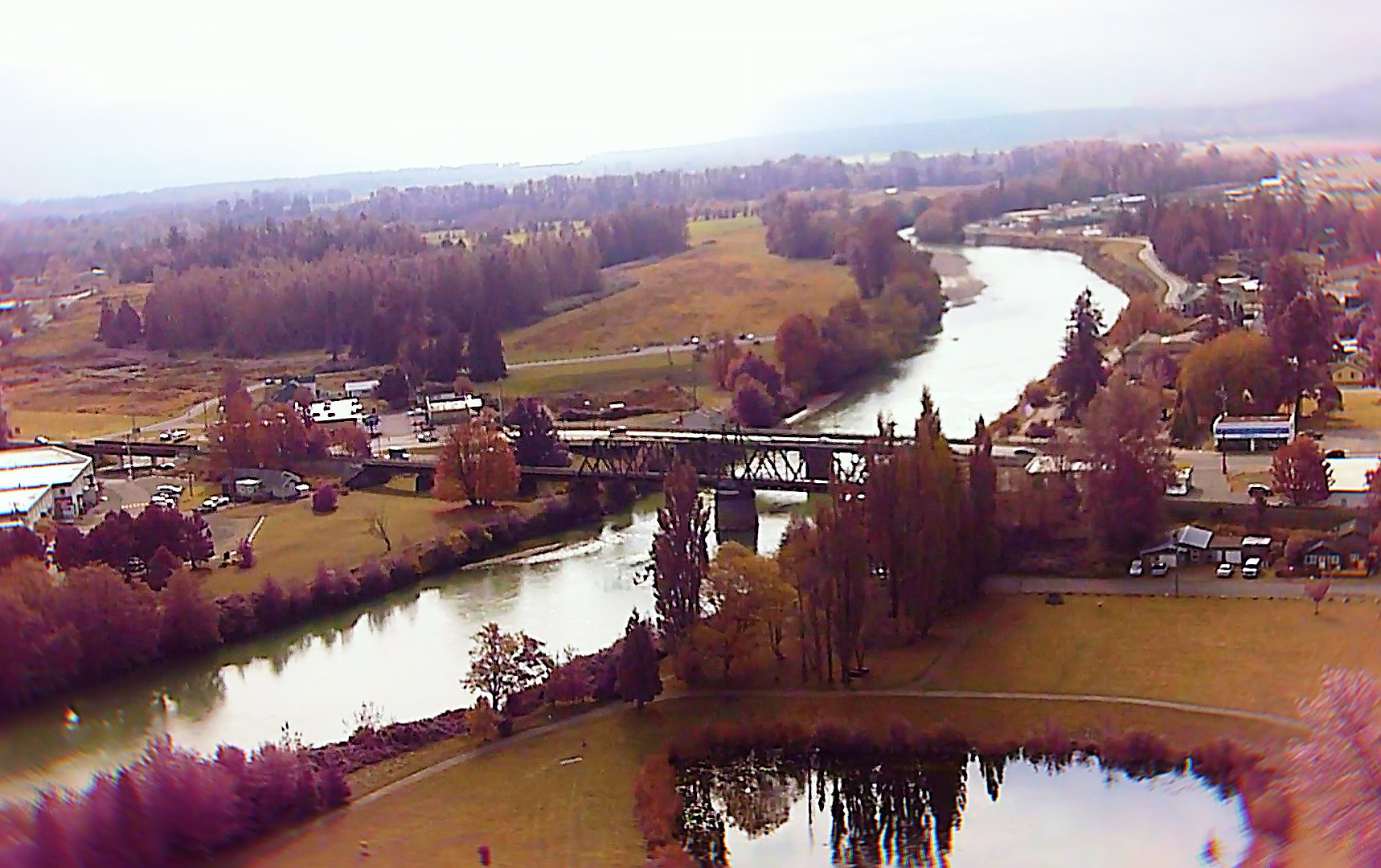
- Aerial photo of the river in Ferndale, Washington

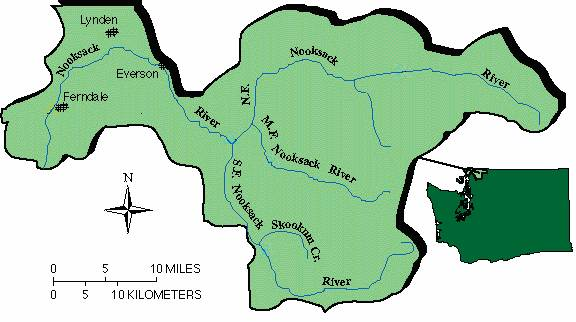
- Nooksack Basin

- Mouth of the Nooksack River in Washington

Location
- Country: United States
- State: Washington
- Counties: Whatcom
- Cities: Ferndale, Marietta

Physical characteristics
- Source: Cascade Range
  - location: Mount Baker Wilderness
  - coordinates: 48°50′0″N 121°33′18″W
  - elevation: 3,620 ft (1,100 m)
- Mouth: Bellingham Bay
  - coordinates: 48°46′29″N 122°35′57″W
  - elevation: 0 ft (0 m)
- Length: 75 mi (121 km)
- Basin size: 786 sq mi (2,040 km^{2})
- Discharge
  - location: Ferndale
  - average: 3,814 cu ft/s (108.0 m^{3}/s)
  - minimum: 466 cu ft/s (13.2 m^{3}/s)
  - maximum: 48,200 cu ft/s (1,360 m^{3}/s)

Basin features
- Tributaries
  - left: Wells Creek, Glacier Creek, Middle Fork Nooksack River, South Fork Nooksack River
  - right: Canyon Creek

The Nooksack River is a river in western Whatcom County of the northwestern U.S. state of Washington, draining extensive valley systems within the North Cascades around Mount Shuksan, Mount Baker and the Twin Sisters, and a portion of Fraser Lowland south of the Canada–United States border.

The river proper begins with the merging of three main tributaries, namely the North Fork, Middle Fork and South Fork, near Deming. All three forks originate in the Mount Baker Wilderness, and the North Fork, the longest of the three, is sometimes considered the main river. The Nooksack is approximately 75 miles (121 km) in total length measuring from the North Fork headwaters. The lower Nooksack flows as a northerly loop through the fertile southern Fraser Lowland agricultural area before emptying into Bellingham Bay and, via the Strait of Juan de Fuca and the Strait of Georgia, communicating with the Pacific Ocean.

== Course ==
=== North Fork ===
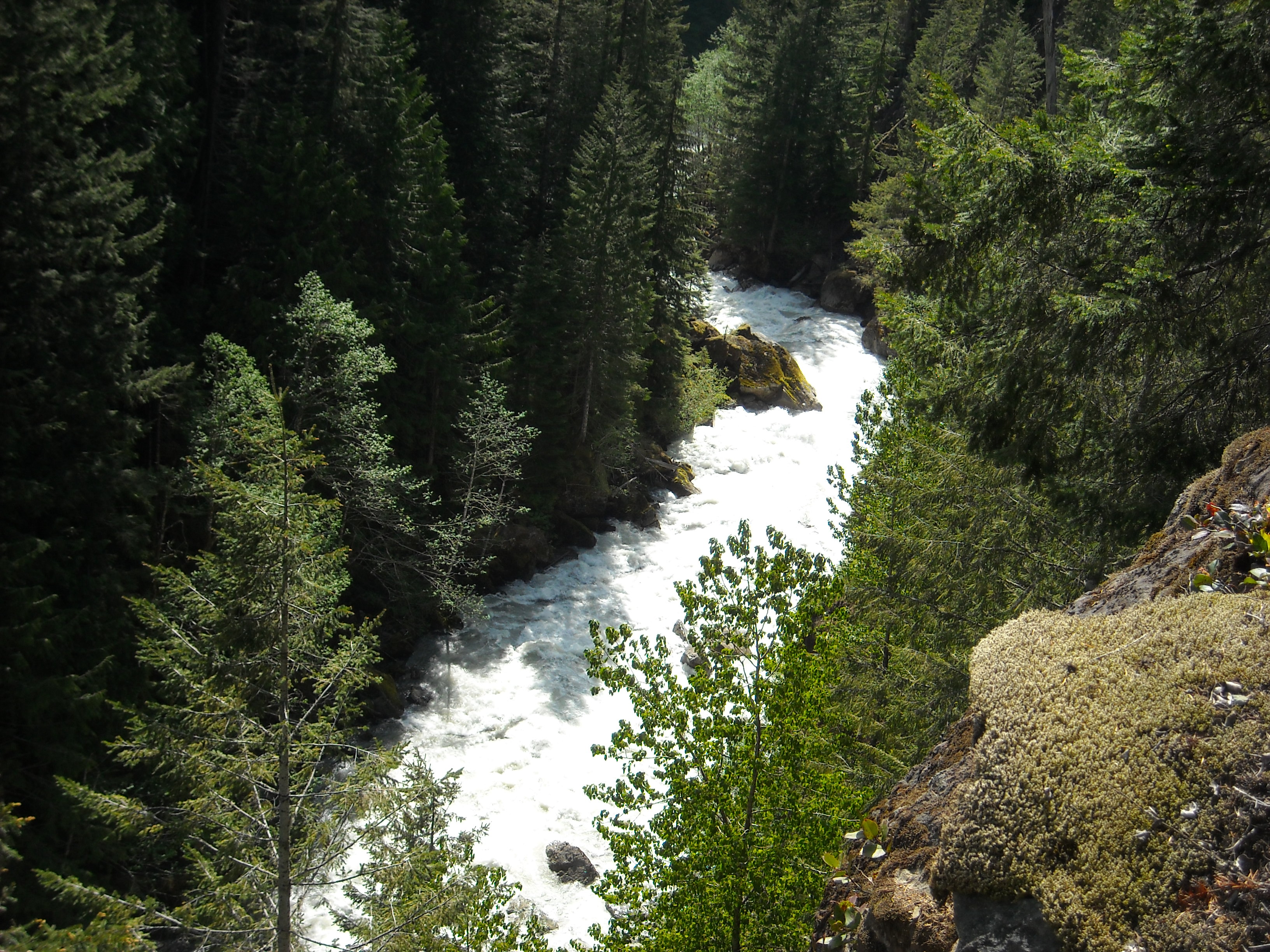
Looking down at the raging North Fork Nooksack River from the Mount Baker Highway, which, at this location, runs along a 200-foot cliff that drops almost straight into the river. This location is just upstream from Nooksack Falls.

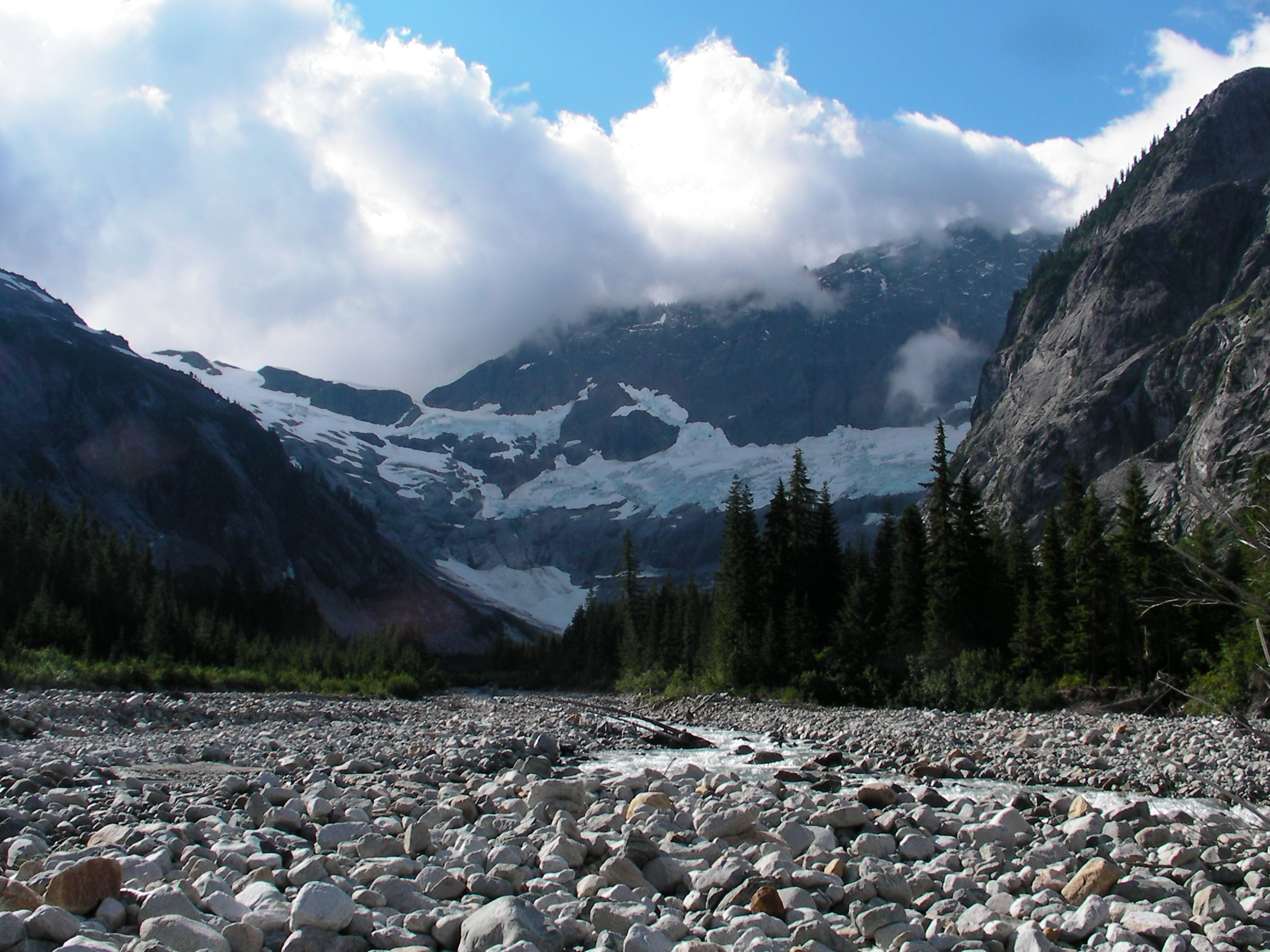
Nooksack River cirque

The North Fork Nooksack River rises at the Nooksack Cirque east of Mount Shuksan within the western part of North Cascades National Park in central Whatcom County. Gathering meltwater off East Nooksack Glacier, it flows generally west past north of Mount Baker. For most of its course, this fork is paralleled by State Route 542 (also called the Mount Baker Highway). The river picks up large creeks such as Price Creek, a short creek draining Price Lake; as well as Ruth Creek, before the uppermost highway bridge crosses it.

At Nooksack Falls, the river flows through a narrow valley and drops freely 88 feet (27 m) into a deep rocky river canyon. The falls are viewable from the forested cover near the cliff edge. A small parking lot nearby contains a kiosk with information about the falls and a hydroelectric project.

Continuing west, the North Fork receives several tributaries including Wells Creek, which joins the river at the base of the falls, and Glacier Creek and Canyon Creek, before the river turns briefly south. The Middle Fork and South Fork join the North Fork within a few miles of one another. The Middle Fork joins first, with its confluence opposite Welcome. The South Fork joins just southeast of Deming and the Nooksack Indian Reservation, creating the Nooksack River proper.

The traditional name of the North Fork in the Nooksack language is Chuw7álich ("the next point").

=== Middle Fork ===
The Middle Fork Nooksack River, about 20 miles (32 km) long, originates on the southern slopes of Mount Baker near Baker Pass. It flows generally northwest between Mount Baker and Twin Sisters, and drains into the North Fork opposite Welcome, about 4.5 km (2.8 mi) northeast of the confluence between the North and South Forks.

The traditional name of the Middle Fork in the Nooksack language is Nuxwt’íqw’em ("always-murky water").

=== South Fork ===
The South Fork Nooksack River, about 50 miles (80 km) long, rises in southern Whatcom County, east of Twin Sisters Mountain near Bell Pass and Lake Wiseman. It flows briefly south, entering Skagit County, then northwest to re-enter Whatcom County. It flows past the town of Acme, and due north until merging with the North Fork near the State Route 9 bridge, 1.6 km (1 mi) southeast of Deming and the Nooksack Indian Reservation.

The traditional name of the South Fork in the Nooksack language is Nuxw7íyem ("always-clear water").

=== Nooksack proper ===
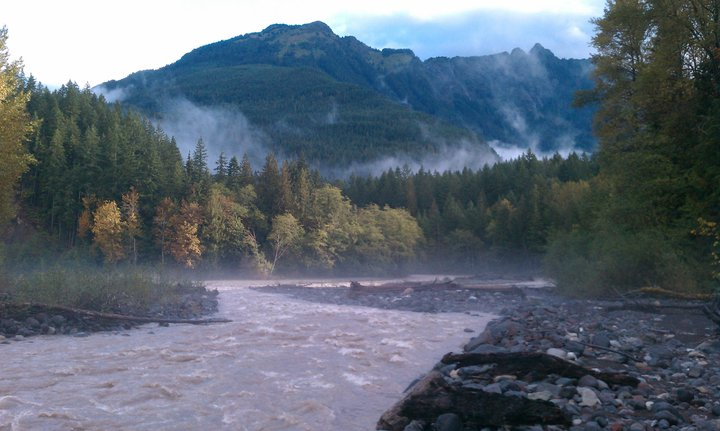
Glacier Creek joins the Nooksack River

After the Middle and South Forks join, the combined river flows northwest, emerging from the valley south of the Sumas Mountain and flowing past Everson and Lynden. Near Everson, the river is at risk of floods breaching the right bank, allowing flow into lower lands to the north, through Sumas River and into Canada. At Lynden the river turns southwest and, near Ferndale, south. Its mouth is at the north side of Bellingham Bay at the Lummi Indian Reservation, approximately 3 miles (4.8 km) west of Bellingham.

== River modifications ==
The river supplies the nearby town of Glacier, Washington with hydroelectric power from a dam on the North Fork near Nooksack Falls. The Middle Fork was partially blocked with a diversion dam built by the City of Bellingham in the late 1950s for diverting water into Lake Whatcom, which supplies the city's drinking water. As of July 2020, this old water diversion system has been modified to remove the dam and restore the river channel for the benefit of critical salmon spawning habitat.

In the late 19th century, most of the stream flow of the Nooksack River near its mouth flowed through the present channel of the short Lummi River to Lummi Bay, northwest of Bellingham Bay. Near the start of the 20th century, a log jam plugged the channel to Lummi Bay, forcing the river to change its channel to the present one. The accumulation of the new river delta has been an ongoing field of research regarding the new wetlands it has created. The river only resupplies the previous delta on Lummi Bay during high-flow conditions.

== Floods ==
The river is subject to flooding due to high rainfall amounts in the region and some of the deepest snow packs in the country. The Pineapple Express, a weather pattern that brings central Pacific wind and rain to the northwest, can sometimes catalyze flooding. For example, flooding in Everson occurred 14 times from to 1936 to 2003. Specific examples of floods are:

- In November 1990, flooding caused over $20 million in damage and the closure of the Trans-Canada Highway for 26 hours.
- In November 1995, flooding caused $4 million in damage in Whatcom County.
- During a November 2006 storm, the river flooded the city of Everson.
- In November and December 2021, water from the Nooksack River filled the Sumas Prairie in Canada's Fraser Valley. This resulted in evacuations because of a landslide, $1 billion in damage in Abbotsford, British Columbia, and further damage elsewhere.
- The river is expected to top levees in Lynden, Washington c. December 12, 2025 during the 2025 Pacific Northwest floods

Both the U.S. and Canada have faced long-term political hurdles to adequate flood prevention. "On the Washington side, there has been a reluctance to spend money to benefit Canada", and on the Canadian side, "B.C. has been reluctant to use the International Joint Commission following a 1988 report that resulted in the cancellation of the Sage Creek coal mine on the Flathead River".

== WRIA 1 Water Rights Adjudication ==
During July of 2024 the Washington State Department of Ecology filed an adjudication to determine water rights in Water Resource Inventory Area 1 (WRIA 1), which covers the Nooksack River watershed and adjacent smaller watersheds in Whatcom and Skagit Counties. The adjudication covers an estimated 30,000 private well owners, public utilities, the Mt. Baker Ski Area, and the Lummi and Nooksack Nations.

The Nooksack River had experienced low water levels in the preceding summers, and the state legislature determined WRIA 1 was a critical watershed within the Department of Ecology system. The Department of Ecology was tasked with adjudicating water use within the specified watershed area, and determine who has legal water rights and how much they are allowed to use. The Department estimates it could take 10 years or more to fully determine who has legal water rights and resolve the underlying issue of water management.

== Nooksack Valley ==
The Nooksack Valley are a collection of mountain valleys within the North Cascades centered around Mount Shuksan, Mount Baker and the Twin Sisters, formed by the catchments of the upper Nooksack River and its alpine tributaries (primarily the North Fork, Middle Fork and South Fork). Roughly covering the western half of Washington state's Whatcom County and a small northern fringe of Skagit County, the Nooksack valleys expands between the Sumas Mountain and Stewart Mountain (between which the valley proper is located) to the west; the Red Mountain, Church Mountain and Goat Mountain in the north; the Ruth Mountain, Icy Peak and Nooksack Cirque in the east; and the Lyman Hill and Mount Josephine in the south.

Out of the three main tributary valleys, the North Fork Valley communicates with the Columbia Valley in the north via a decently wide mountain pass between the Sumas and Red Mountain, where the Washington State Route 547 goes through from Kendall to Peaceful Valley; and the South Fork Valley communicates with the Skagit Valley in the south via a narrow pass between Stewart/Anderson Mountain and Lyman Hill, where the State Route 9 goes through from Saxon to Prairie.

The Nooksack Valley proper beings at the confluence of the North and South Forks east of Deming about 740 m (0.46 mi) south of the T-junction roundabout between State Route 9 and 542, and finishes at the western end of the Sumas-Stewart gap (where the State Route 9 and 542 split apart again) around Cedarville and Lawrence, after which the Nooksack River enters the American side of the Fraser Lowland (known as the "Nooksack Lowland") and courses northwest towards Everson and Lynden, then turns southwest towards Ferndale before bending south to empty into the Bellingham Bay between the city of Bellingham and the Lummi Indian Reservation.

== See also ==
- List of rivers of Washington (state)
