= Nooksack people =

Native American tribe in Washington state

Nooksack Noxwsʼáʔaq Nuxwsá7aq
- The Nooksack logo, with Kulshan and its foothills, a Nooksack man in a shovel nose canoe, and the Nooksack River.

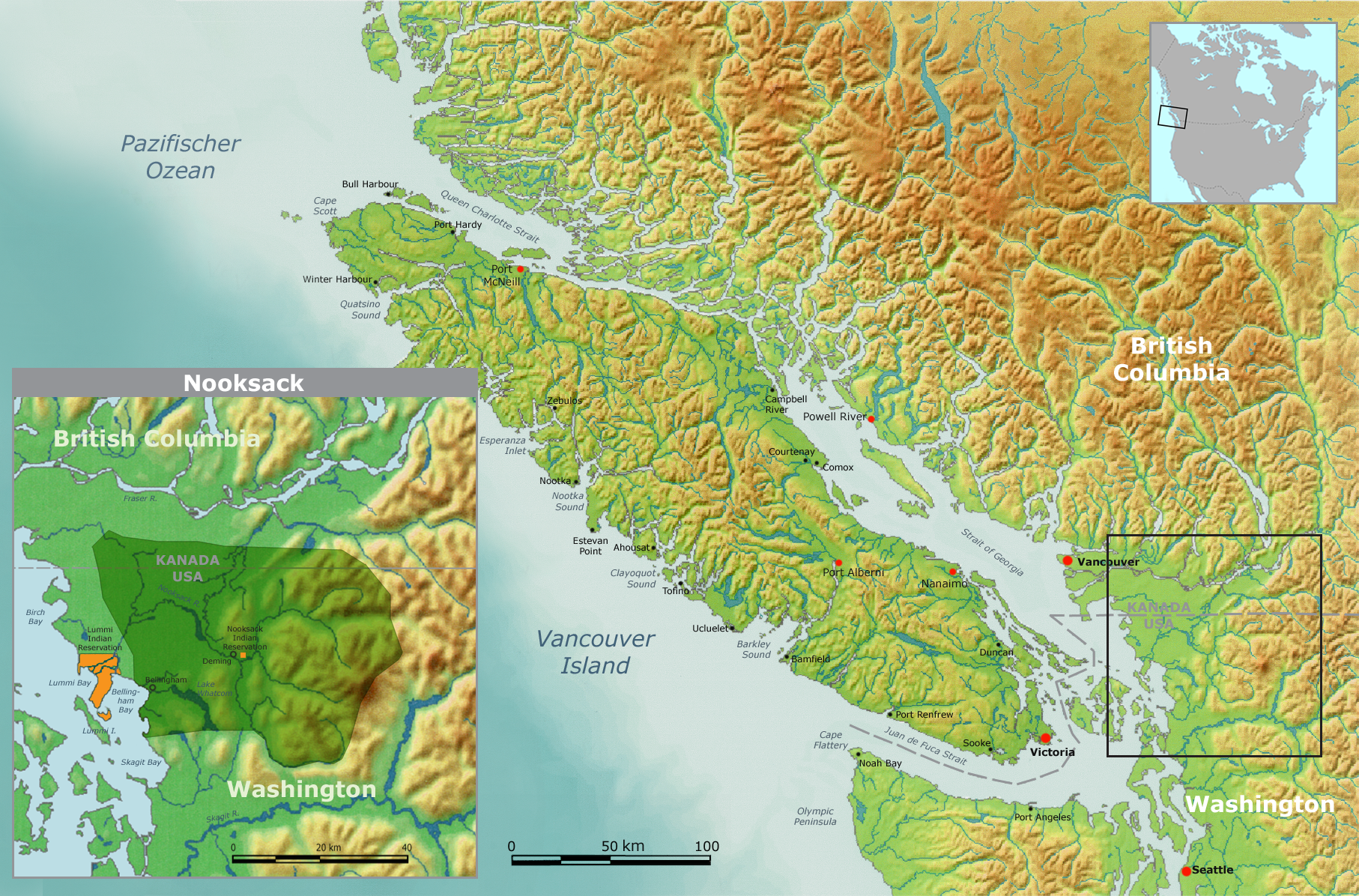

Total population
- 1,800

Regions with significant populations
- Whatcom County, Washington

Languages
- English, Nooksack

Religion
- American Indian pantheism, Christianity, other

Related ethnic groups
- other Coast Salish peoples

Location of the Nooksack Indian Reservation

The Nooksack (/ˈnʊksæk/; Nooksack: Noxwsʼáʔaq or Nuxwsá7aq) are an Indigenous people of the Pacific Northwest Coast. Today, the majority of them are federally recognized as the Nooksack Indian Tribe, located in the mainland northwest corner of Washington state along the Nooksack River near the small town of Deming (in western Whatcom County), and 12 miles south of the Canadian border. As of 2008, they had more than 1,800 enrolled citizens. Their terms for citizenship include descent from persons listed in a 1942 tribal census.

They are part of the Coast Salish people and have traditionally spoken Nooksack, one of the Salishan family of languages. It is closely related to the Halkomelem language of coastal British Columbia, and at one time was considered a dialect of the latter. At the time of European encounter, the Nooksack people occupied territory extending into present-day British Columbia. But the setting of the border between Canada and the United States split the people into two territories. Halkomelem was still dominant in the Nooksack watershed in the US.

== History ==
The name Nooksack originates from a place name in the Nooksack language meaning "always bracken fern roots".

Like most Northwest Coast indigenous peoples, the Nooksack long occupied a watershed area where they relied on fishing, hunting, and clamming, as well as gathering root vegetables and berries, and processing these for sustenance. Their territory extended from the mountains to the coast of present-day northwest Washington state in the watershed of the Nooksack River, and into British Columbia, Canada. They set up seasonal camps for hunting or fishing, such as timing when they could harvest salmon runs. European exploration and colonization of the Pacific Northwest resulted in social disruption, high death rates from infectious disease, and their losing access to much of their historic territory. The surviving Nooksack continued to live near the river by which they are known.

In 1934 Congress and President Franklin D. Roosevelt passed the Wheeler-Howard Act, also known as the Indian Reorganization Act. It was intended to help improve the condition of indigenous peoples by enabling them to revive and restore Indian self-government, which had been largely reduced, especially on Indian reservations. Because the Nooksack had not been granted reservation land by the U.S. government in the 19th century, they were not recognized as a tribe at the time by the Bureau of Indian Affairs.

In the 1930s the Nooksack tribe voted to accept the Wheeler-Howard Act and began working on a tribal constitution to establish an elected government under its model. They took a census in 1942 of persons considered members of the tribal community. Their constitution also provided for other forms of documentation and identity recognition. During the later decades of the 20th century, the people worked to organize their community and gain federal recognition as a tribe. In this period many Nooksack and other Coastal Salish worked and lived away from Whatcom County, further south in the Puget Sound area where there were more jobs.

The Nooksack acquired a one-acre (4,000m^{2}) parcel of land in 1970, as their reservation, and gained full federal recognition in 1973. That land was taken into trust by the US Department of Interior, as has been much of the other lands they have acquired. Their land base has subsequently increased to 3,133.61 acres, which includes fee land, trust land, and individual trust land. Trust land is land held by the federal government in trust for a native tribe or nation. It is the area where the tribe exercises its sovereign authority.

Federal court decisions in the 1970s, including what is known as the Boldt decision, have affirmed Native American rights in Washington state to fish and gather food in their traditional ways from their historic territories.

== Government ==
The tribe created a constitution conforming to the model of elected government as proposed under the Indian Reorganization Act. Under its constitution, tribal citizens elect representatives to an 8-person council. Half the positions are elected in alternating years. The tribal chairman is elected as one of the eight, as are the vice-chairman, treasurer, and secretary. All terms are for two years. The tribal council approves policy and passes laws affecting members.

The tribe also has a judicial branch with a tribal court.

=== Citizenship ===
The tribe set its rules for citizenship as: "recipients of early land allotments, recipients of a 1965 government settlement, or people who appeared on a 1942 tribal census", and their direct descendants. Section H of the Nooksack constitution also allowed the enrollment of “persons who possess at least ¼ Indian blood and who can prove Nooksack ancestry to any degree.”

In 2014 Chairman Bob Kelly initiated a referendum removing Section H from the constitution; it passed with 61% of the vote.

=== Disenrollment controversy ===
Like other federally recognized tribes, the Nooksack set their own citizenship qualifications. Since 2012, the tribe has been embroiled in a bitter political controversy, in part related to determining citizenship. That year the tribe refused enrollment of several young children of Terry St. Germain, although they had enrolled his two oldest children. Claiming descent from Annie George, he had become an enrolled citizen as a teenager. His brother Rudy St. Germain was also enrolled and in 2012 was serving on the tribal council, as was their cousin Michelle Roberts, another George descendant. The enrollment office said the family had insufficient documentation of Nooksack descent.

Following rejection of St. Germain's application for his children, under the leadership of Chairman Bob Kelly, the tribe conducted a review of citizenship and descent across several families. Kelly personally reviewed the confusing records of the Bureau of Indian Affairs in Everett, concluding the Annie George descendants were insufficiently documented. In 2013, the tribal council sent out a notice of disenrollment to 306 living descendants of ancestor Annie George (born 1875) and her three daughters. Thirty-seven were elders.

Annie George's name did not appear in a 1942 tribal census, which has been the basis required for documenting descent for tribal citizenship, nor was there a record that she was granted land. But her brother Louis George was listed on the 1942 tribal census. Her daughters: Elizabeth (Libby), Emma and Louisa) married Filipino migrant workers, and lived and worked in other areas of the southern Puget Sound for years. Their descendants were accepted for enrollment as Nooksack citizens in the early 1980s under Section H of the constitution, about a decade after the tribe was federally recognized.

Annie George is known as a daughter of Matsqui George, known leader of a Nooksack village in what is now British Columbia. The ancestral tribal members were considered one people until Canada and the United States established boundaries across former common land. Annie's mother died soon after her birth and her father remarried. He and his family later moved to Washington state. In the 1910 federal census Annie's half-brother Louis George was recorded as living with his mother (the second wife) and his and Annie's father Matsqui George in Washington state, and all are identified as Nooksack.

Over time descendants of the three daughters' families, known as the Rabang, Rapada, and Narte-Gladstone, gained political power in the tribe. By the 21st century, some were elected to office. Some other tribal citizens resented their power, as well as worrying because some citizens of these families were prosecuted for drug trade. In the 21st century, the now 306 living descendants comprise about 15 percent of the tribe.

According to Kelly (and current chair Ross Cline Sr.), Annie George's descendants had been mistakenly enrolled in the 1980s under Section H of the constitution. Kelly believed he had to correct the situation. In February 2013, the tribal council sent notices to the 306 individuals, informing them that their citizenship would be revoked within 30 days. This would result in their losing status as citizens, losing their community and formal identity as Nooksack, and affecting access to federal education and health benefits.

Opponents protested the disenrollment, saying that it was an effort by Kelly to gain more power before a competitive tribal election. People opposed to the disenrollment marched in protest in March 2013 in Seattle, the largest city in the state. The families hired Gabriel S. Galanda (Round Valley Indian Tribes) to represent them. Born and raised in Port Angeles, Washington, he became an attorney and set up his own practice in Seattle, specializing in Native American issues. He consulted with the Bureau of Indian Affairs (BIA) on behalf of The 306.

Opponents of Kelly's position have said the disenrollment decision was political, and that Kelly was trying to get rid of critics before the next council election. Votes were very close among candidates in the primary election in the spring of 2014.

In March 2014, the disenrollment case was pending in tribal court, which, a KUOW reporter noted, usually decided in alliance with the majority on the tribal council. This would have been the largest mass disenrollment by any tribe within Washington state.

Kelly allegedly fired tribal employees who supported or were citizens of the Nooksack 306. In addition, "the tribal council allegedly fired a judge who was about to rule against them, disbarred the attorney representing the 306, and by most accounts refused to hold new tribal elections until after the 306 are officially disenrolled."

After a close primary, four tribal council positions were up for election in March 2014. The council refused to call elections until action was finished on disenrollment of the Nooksack 306. As the delay continued into 2016, Tribal Elder George Adams, the tribe's election superintendent, believed the council had gone too far. He "invoked the right of General Council, an ancient tradition meaning the voice of the people. According to tradition, the tribe gives authority to its leaders, but in extreme cases of misuse this authority can be revoked by the tribe, which acts together as a single unit, the General Council."

In March 2016, Tribal Judge Susan Alexander ruled that the tribe could not disbar Galanda from representing the 306 clients in tribal court. Alexander was later removed from her post. In March 2016 an appeals court ruled that the 306 citizens could still vote in tribal elections.

Because the tribal council refused to schedule an election, Tribal Elder George Adams on July 14, 2016, called a General Council meeting in order to conduct a 'special election' of the four open council seats. More than 200 attendees met off the reservation to ensure they did not have tribal interference. They elected four interim council members and also invalidated the recall of Carmen Tageant from the Tribal Council, returning her to office.

Elected as vice chairman was Bob Doucette, who had served on the council in the 1970s; Bernadine Roberts, also a former council member, was elected treasurer. Jeremiah Johnny and Ron Roberts were elected to the two council positions, and Tageant was returned to her seat. A majority of the council now opposed disenrollment of the 306. These were interim positions, and the tribal council said they wanted the federal government to supervise an election for the four open positions.

Chairman Bob Kelly said he would not recognize this General Council election as valid. His supporters on the council include Secretary Nadene Rapada and citizen Bob Solomon. A new 'supreme court' was created by the tribal council with Kelly as chief justice, an action that was invalidated by the federal government in 2019 as it went against the Nooksack constitution.

The tribe lost federal funding in 2017 because the Bureau of Indian Affairs said it had acted improperly by trying to disenroll the 306 and postponing an important election related to this controversy.

After a supervised general election was held in December 2017, the federal government reinstated tribal funding in March 2018. The elections resulted in further legal challenges after allegations of fraud and irregularities surfaced, as Kelly supporters were returned to office.

In 2018 the newly elected tribal council, with a majority of Kelly supporters, voted to proceed with disenrolling the George descendants. Several families continued to live on tribal land in tribal housing.

In 2019 the council passed a new rule requiring a ground sublease with the tribe for underlying Tribal Trust Land. Eligibility for such subleases were limited to enrolled tribal members. The council said that growth in the tribe meant these houses were needed for Nooksack citizens. They notified 61 former citizens (of the 306 disenrolled) that they would have to leave this housing.

Twenty-one homes had been federally funded under a program with the Department of Housing and Urban Development. Many George descendants had occupied such housing for more than a decade, and some had nearly completed a lease-to-own program, making payments to the tribe. Galanda, who continues to dispute the legality of the disenrollment of the 306, has suggested that the tribe violated due process in proposing eviction. The tribe had to comply with federal civil rights law for units built with federal funding. The case has gained renewed federal attention from both the Department of Interior and HUD. They initiated an investigation in fall 2021 related to civil rights issues and accounting for payments from tenants to the tribe for this housing.

Despite appeals, in December 2021 the tribe was set to evict 61 former citizens, and two of their children who were enrolled citizens. Ross Cline Sr. serves as the current tribal chairman.

In December 2021, the Nooksack 306 through Galanda appealed to the United Nations High Commissioner for Human Rights, "seeking to have that organization intervene, review the situation and ask the Biden administration to immediately take steps to halt the evictions." UN rapporteurs, or monitors, traveled to Whatcom County to review the issues and also consulted with related US agencies.

"Balakrishnan Rajagopal is the special rapporteur on adequate housing, and Francisco Cali Tzay is the special rapporteur on the rights of Indigenous peoples." In early February 2022 they called on the US government to prevent eviction of the families. Galanda said this was the first case he knew of in which UN monitors reviewed a dispute within an indigenous tribe.

== Notable Nooksack people ==
- Sasha LaPointe, poet and memoirist

== Demographics ==
As of the 2000 census, the Nooksack Indian Reservation, at 48°53′03″N 122°20′54″W in Whatcom County, had a resident population of 547 persons living on 2,720 acres (11 km^{2}) of land. Of these residents, 373 persons, or 68.2 percent, identified as being solely of Native American ancestry.

== Language ==
The Nooksack language (Lhéchalosem) belongs to the Salishan family of Native American languages, and is most similar to the Halkomelem language of British Columbia, of which it was once considered a dialect. Until the mid-20th century, Halkomelem had become the dominant indigenous language of the Nooksack in the United States. This demonstrated how closely the people were related on each side of the border. As of 2016, the last fluent speaker of Nooksack and its dialects was George Adams, a 70-year-old elder of the tribe.

In the late 20th century, observers thought the language had become extinct around 1988. In the 1970s American linguist Brent Galloway had worked closely with another fluent native speaker. He was trying to create a dictionary of the Nooksack language but it is unclear if that work was published before his death. Galloway's book Dictionary of Upriver Halkomelem (2009) covers a language that was in the same region but distinct from that earlier spoken by the Nooksack people.
