= Nooksack language =

Revived Salish language of Washington state

Nooksack
- Lhéchelesem
- Pronunciation: /'ɬə.t͡ʃə.lə.səm/
- Region: Whatcom County, Washington
- Ethnicity: Nooksack people
- Extinct: July 13, 1977, with the death of Sindick Jimmy
- Revival: 1 fluent L2 speaker (2020)
- Language family: Salish: Coast Salish; Central; Nooksack

Language codes
- ISO 639-3: nok
- Glottolog: nook1247
- Nooksack is classified as Extinct by the UNESCO Atlas of the World's Languages in Danger.

Nooksack (Nooksack: Lhéchelesem, /'ɬə.t͡ʃə.lə.səm/) is a Coast Salish language of the Salishan language family. Nooksack is spoken by the Nooksack people, who reside primarily along the Nooksack River in Whatcom County, Washington.

Linguistically, Nooksack is most closely related to the Squamish, shíshálh and Halkomelem languages, which are all spoken in nearby parts of British Columbia, Canada. Some researchers have questioned whether the Nooksack language is simply a divergent dialect of Halkomelem, but research has proved that Nooksack is in fact a distinct language.

The Nooksack language has only one fluent speaker as of 2020.

== Usage and revitalization efforts ==
In the 1970s, the linguist Brent Galloway worked closely with the last remaining native speaker, Sindick Jimmy, to compile a dictionary of the Nooksack language. His book, Nooksack Place Names: Geography, Culture, and Language, was published in 2011. In 1977, Nooksack became extinct with the death of Jimmy.

Now, the Nooksack Indian Tribe has offered classes in the language. As of 2020, one fluent speaker remained, a Nooksack tribal member who has been part of the Lhéchelesem Teacher Training Language Immersion Project. In the project, students will spend mornings in language immersion, and afternoons working on special projects, focusing on the language use in one aspect of local native culture such as fishing or crafts. After two years, the students will obtain a certificate similar to an associate degree, and after four years they will be fully qualified language teachers, with the equivalent of a Bachelor of Arts. The aim is to revive the use of the Lhéchelesem language in all aspects of daily life. The program has an annual budget of $110,000, with 60 percent funded by the Administration for Native Americans (ANA) and 40 percent funded by the Nooksack Indian Tribe.

== Phonology ==
=== Vowels ===
The following table includes all the vowel sounds found in the Nooksack language.

	Front	Central	Back
Close	i		(u)
Mid		ə	o
Open	æ	a	

=== Consonants ===
The following table includes all the consonant sounds found in the Nooksack language.

		Labial	Alveolar			Post- alveolar	Velar		Uvular		Glottal
		Labial	plain	sibilant	lateral	Post- alveolar	plain	lab.	plain	lab.	Glottal
Stop	plain	p	t	t͡s		t͡ʃ	k	kʷ	q	qʷ	ʔ
Stop	ejective	pʼ	tʼ	t͡sʼ	t͡ɬʼ	t͡ʃʼ		kʷʼ	qʼ	qʷʼ	
Fricative	plain			s	ɬ	ʃ	x	xʷ	χ	χʷ	h
Fricative	ejective				ɬʼ						
Sonorant	plain	m	n		l	j		w			
Sonorant	glottalized					jʼ					

== Orthography ==
Letter	IPA
a	/æ/
ch	/tʃ/
ch'	/tʃʼ/
e	/ə/
h	/h/
i	/i/
k	/k/
k'	/kʼ/
kw	/kʷ/
kw'	/kʷʼ/
l	/l/
lh	/ɬ/
m	/m/
n	/n/
o	/o/
o̱	/a/
p	/p/
p'	/pʼ/
q	/q/
q'	/qʼ/
qw	/qʷ/
qw'	/qʷʼ/
s	/s/
sh	/ʃ/
t	/t/
t'	/tʼ/
th	/θ/
th'	/θʼ/
tl'	/t͡ɬʼ/
ts	/t͡s/
ts'	/t͡sʼ/
u	[u] (allophone of /o/)
w	/w/
x	/xʲ/
xw	/xʷ/
x̱	/χ/
x̱w	/χʷ/
y	/j/
7	/ʔ/

In addition, the diacritic "ː" indicates that the preceding sound is long (e.g. oː, aː). An acute accent (´) is placed on the accented syllable.
