= Mount Shuksan =

Mountain in Washington state, United States

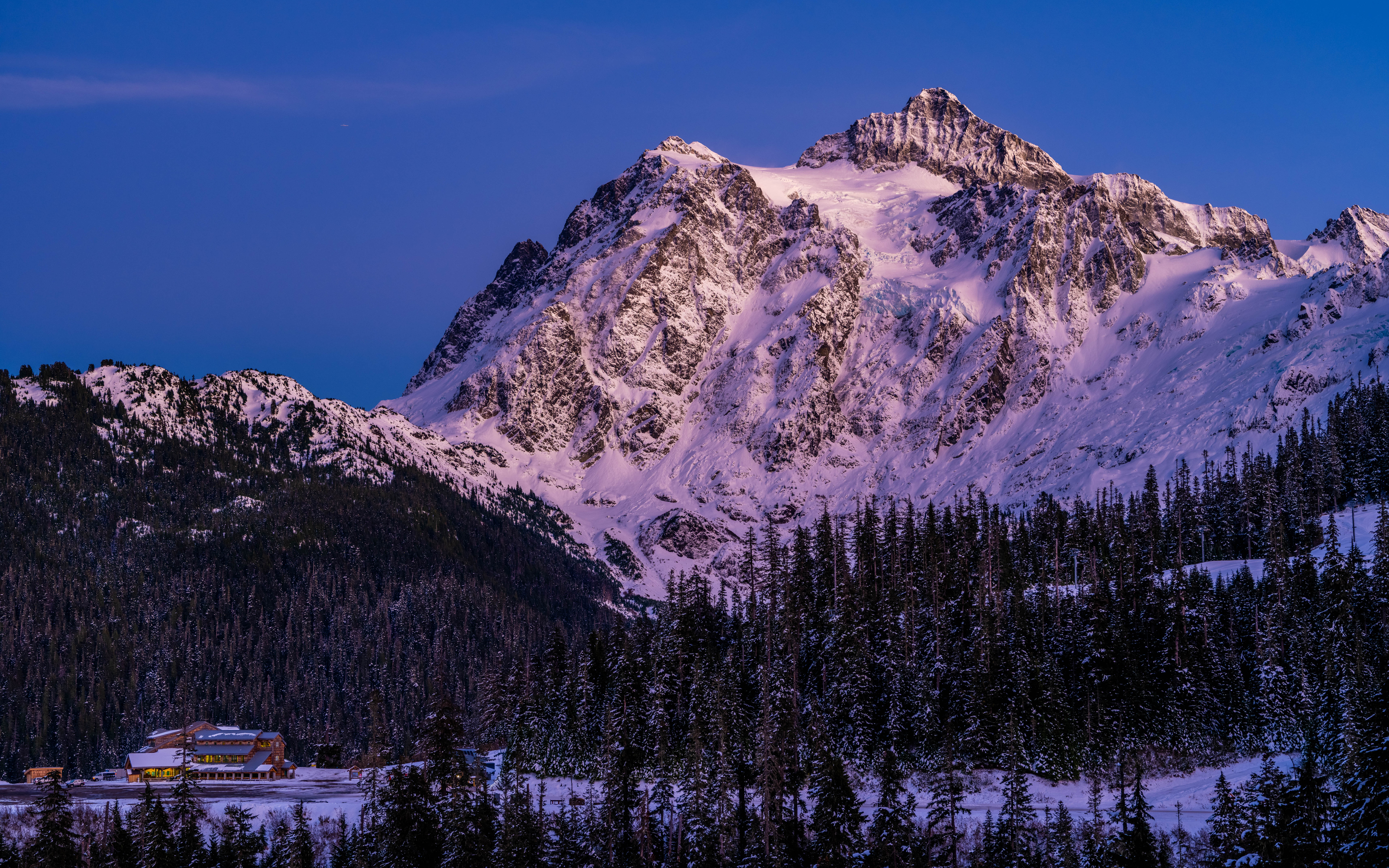
- Mount Shuksan at sunset

Highest point
- Elevation: 9,131 ft (2,783 m) NGVD 29
- Prominence: 4,411 ft (1,344 m)
- Coordinates: 48°49′54″N 121°36′11″W

Geography
- Location within Washington (state)
- Interactive map of Mount Shuksan
- Location: Whatcom County, Washington, U.S.
- Parent range: Cascades
- Topo map: USGS Mount Shuksan

Geology
- Rock age: Cretaceous
- Rock type: Metamorphic schist

Climbing
- First ascent: September 7, 1906 by Asahel Curtis and party
- Easiest route: rock/ice climb, class 3

Mount Shuksan (/ˈʃəksɪn/) is a glaciated massif in the North Cascades National Park. Shuksan rises in Whatcom County, Washington immediately to the east of Mount Baker, and 11.6 miles (18.7 km) south of the Canada–US border. The mountain's name Shuksan is derived from the Lummi word [šéqsən], said to mean "high peak". The highest point on the mountain is a three-sided peak known as Summit Pyramid.

The mountain is composed of Shuksan greenschist, oceanic basalt that was metamorphosed when the Easton terrane collided with the west coast of North America, approximately 120 million years ago. The mountain is an eroded remnant of a thrust plate formed by the Easton collision.

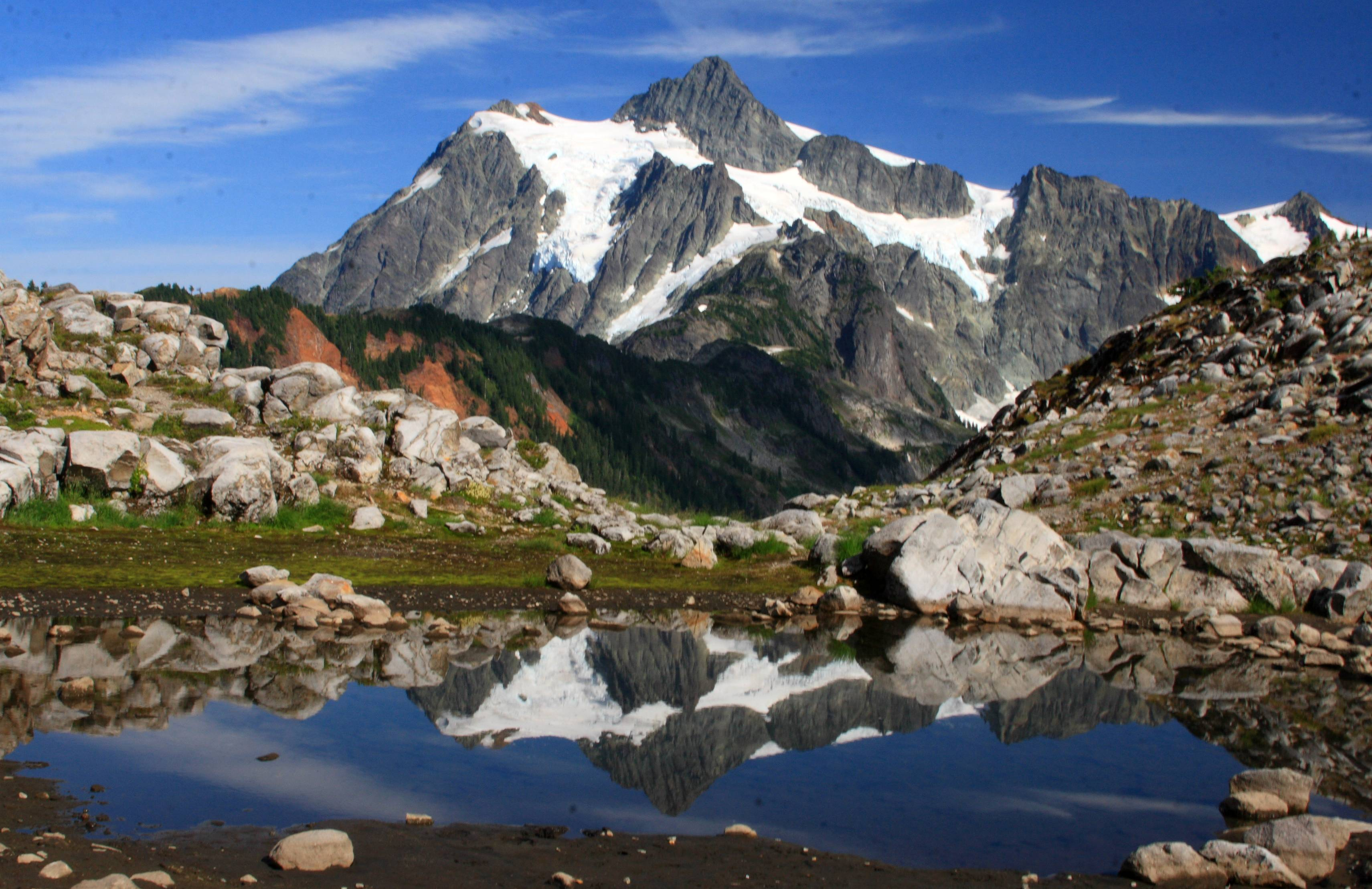
West side view of Mount Shuksan in summer as seen from Artist Point

The Mount Baker Highway, State Route 542, is kept open during the winter to support Mt. Baker Ski Area. In late summer, the road to Artist Point allows visitors to travel a few miles higher for a closer view of the peak. Picture Lake is accessible on the highway and reflects the mountain, making it a popular site for photography.

Sulphide Creek Falls, one of the tallest waterfalls in North America, plunges off the southeastern flank of Mount Shuksan. There are four other tall waterfalls that spill off Mount Shuksan and neighboring Jagged Ridge and Seahpo Peak, mostly sourced from small snowfields and glaciers.

The traditional name of Mount Shuksan in the Nooksack language is Shéqsan ("high foot") or Ch’ésqen ("golden eagle"). Both the Nooksack and Lummi are indigenous tribes who have occupied the watersheds of the Nooksack Rivers and Lummi River, respectively. They are both federally recognized tribes in the United States.

The first ascent of Mount Shuksan is usually attributed to Asahel Curtis and W. Montelius Price on September 7, 1906. However, in a 1907 letter to the editor of the Mazamas club journal, C. E. Rusk attributed the first ascent to Joseph Morowits in 1897. He said that he himself would have attempted it in 1903 if he had not been sure that it had already been climbed.

== Nearby mountains ==
- Mount Triumph
- Mount Despair
- Mount Terror
- Mount Blum
- Mount Baker
- Church Mountain

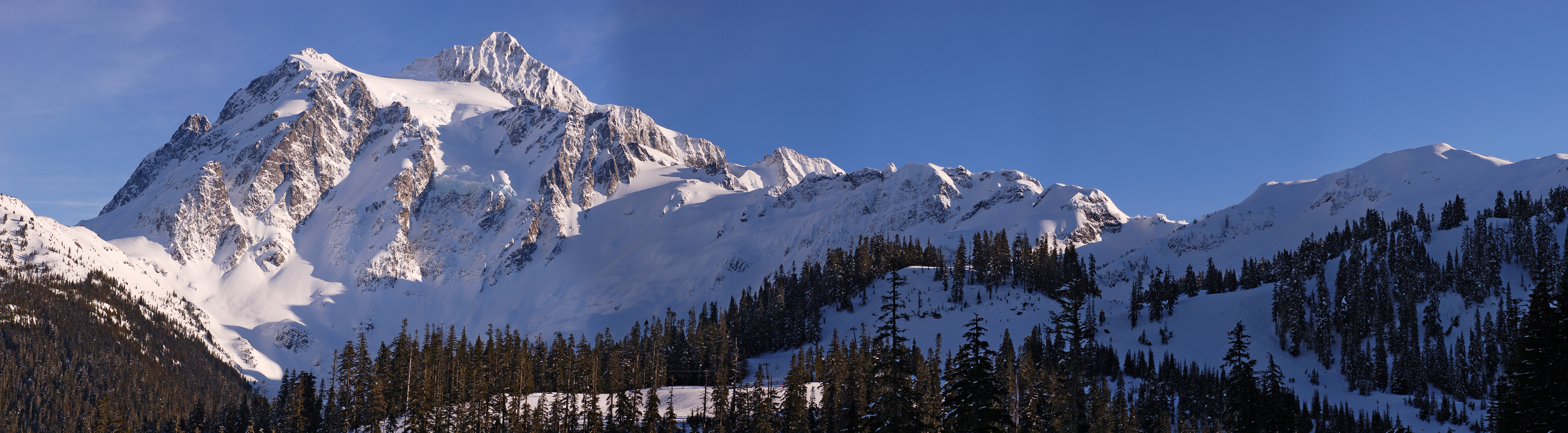
Wide view of the mountain
