= Granite Mountain =

Granite Mountain may refer to:

== Mountains ==
=== Canada ===
- Granite Mountain (British Columbia), in the Rossland Range of the Monashee Mountains

=== United States ===
- Granite Mountain (Arizona), in Yavapai County
- Granite Mountain (Arkansas), near Little Rock
- Granite Mountain (California), in Anza-Borrego Desert State Park
- Granite Mountain (Mono County, California)
- Granite Mountain (Texas), in Burnet County
- Granite Mountain (Salt Lake County, Utah), in the Wasatch Range
- Granite Mountain (Washington), several peaks, including:
  - Granite Mountain (King County, Washington)
  - Granite Mountain (Wenatchee Mountains)
  - Granite Mountain (Whatcom County, Washington)

== Settlements ==
- Granite Mountain, Alaska, a place in Alaska
  - Granite Mountain Air Station
- Granite Mountain, a neighborhood in Little Rock, Arkansas

== Other uses ==
- Granite Mountain charter school, Lucerne Valley, California, US
- Only the Brave (2017 film) (working title Granite Mountain), an American film

== See also ==
- Granite Mountains (disambiguation)
- Granite Peak, several mountains in North America
