= Granite Range =

Granite Range may refer to:

- Granite Range (Alaska) in Alaska, USA
- Granite Range (Montana) in Montana, USA
- Granite Range (Elko County) in Nevada, USA
- Granite Range (Washoe County) in Nevada, USA

== See also ==
- Granite Mountain (disambiguation)
- Granite Mountains (disambiguation)
