= Hannegan Peak =

Mountain in Washington (state), United States

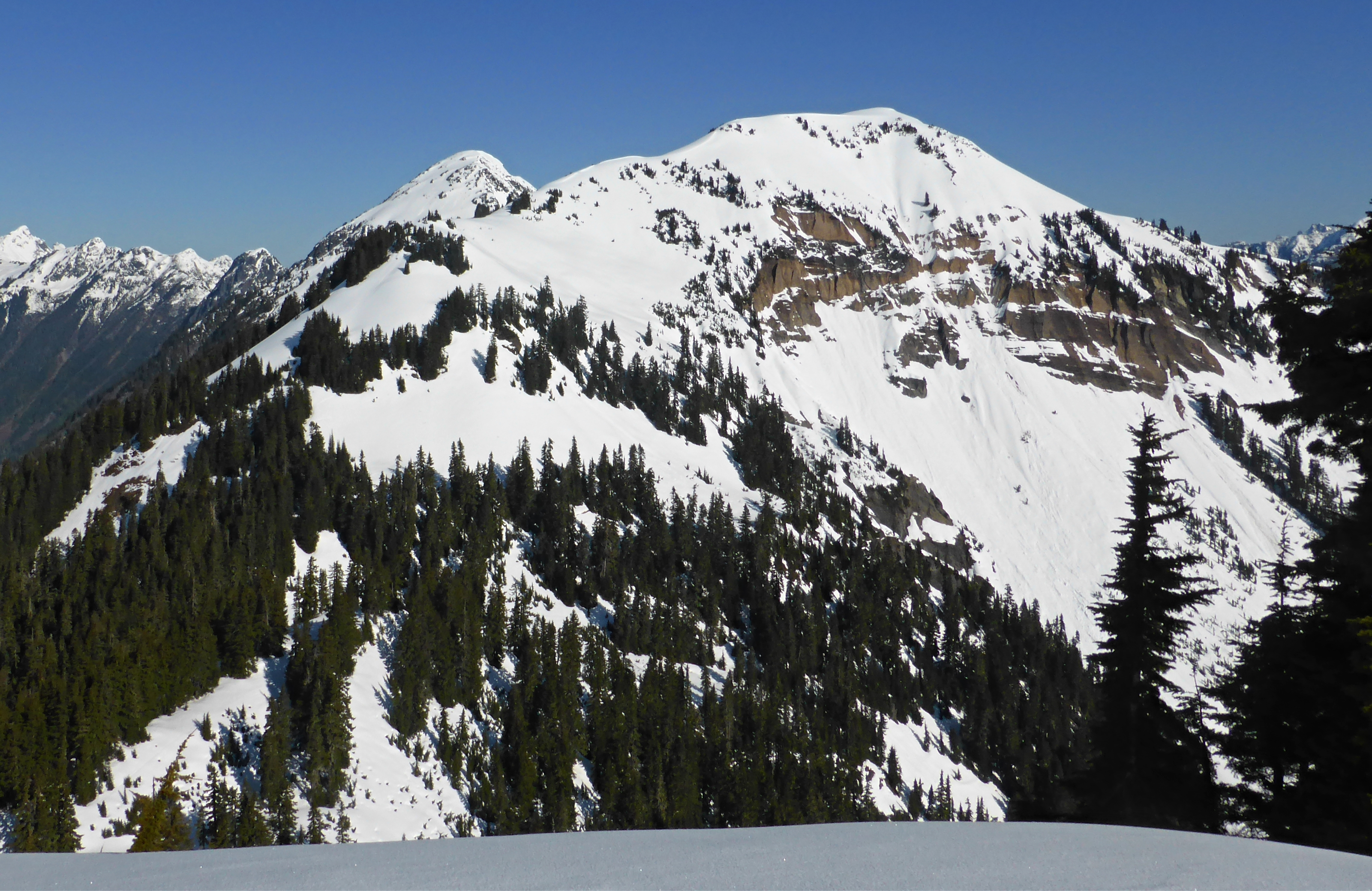
- Hannegan Peak, south aspect

Highest point
- Elevation: 6,191 ft (1,887 m) NAVD 88
- Prominence: 467 ft (142 m)
- Parent peak: Granite Mountain
- Isolation: 1.22 mi (1.96 km)
- Coordinates: 48°53′32″N 121°32′03″W

Geography
- Location within Washington (state) Location within the United States
- Interactive map of Hannegan Peak
- Country: United States
- State: Washington
- County: Whatcom
- Protected area: Mount Baker Wilderness
- Parent range: North Cascades
- Topo map: USGS Mount Sefrit

Geology
- Rock type(s): rhyolite, breccia

Climbing
- First ascent: 1893 by Banning Austin, R.M. Lyle
- Easiest route: Hiking trail

Hannegan Peak is a 6,191-foot elevation (1,887 m) mountain summit located in the Skagit Range, which is a subset of the North Cascades in Whatcom County of Washington state. It is situated immediately north of Hannegan Pass, and 2.2 mi (3.5 km) north of Ruth Mountain in the Mount Baker Wilderness, which is managed by Mount Baker-Snoqualmie National Forest. Banning Austin and R.M. Lyle made the first ascent of Hannegan Peak in 1893 while surveying for a possible road across the Cascades over Hannegan Pass to Whatcom Pass. This peak was named in association with Hannegan Pass, which in turn was named for Tom Hannegan, State Road Commissioner at that time. Although no road was built, a four-mile trail leads hikers to the pass, and another one-mile path leads to the summit. Peaks which can be seen from the summit include Mount Shuksan, Ruth Mountain, Mineral Mountain, Mount Baker, Mount Sefrit, Mount Larrabee, Granite Mountain, Mount Chardonnay, Mount Rexford, the Picket Range, and many more.

== Climate ==
Hannegan Peak is located in the marine west coast climate zone of western North America. Weather fronts originating in the Pacific Ocean travel northeast toward the Cascade Mountains. As fronts approach the North Cascades, they are forced upward by the peaks of the Cascade Range (orographic lift), causing them to drop their moisture in the form of rain or snowfall onto the Cascades. As a result, the west side of the North Cascades experiences high precipitation, especially during the winter months in the form of snowfall. Because of maritime influence, snow tends to be wet and heavy, resulting in high avalanche danger. During winter months, weather is usually cloudy, but, due to high pressure systems over the Pacific Ocean that intensify during summer months, there is often little or no cloud cover during the summer. Due to its temperate climate and proximity to the Pacific Ocean, areas west of the Cascade Crest very rarely experience temperatures below 0 °F (−18 °C) or above 80 °F (27 °C). Precipitation runoff from the mountain drains into tributaries of the Fraser River and the Nooksack River.

== Geology ==
The North Cascades features some of the most rugged topography in the Cascade Range with craggy peaks, ridges, and deep glacial valleys. Geological events occurring many years ago created the diverse topography and drastic elevation changes over the Cascade Range leading to the various climate differences.

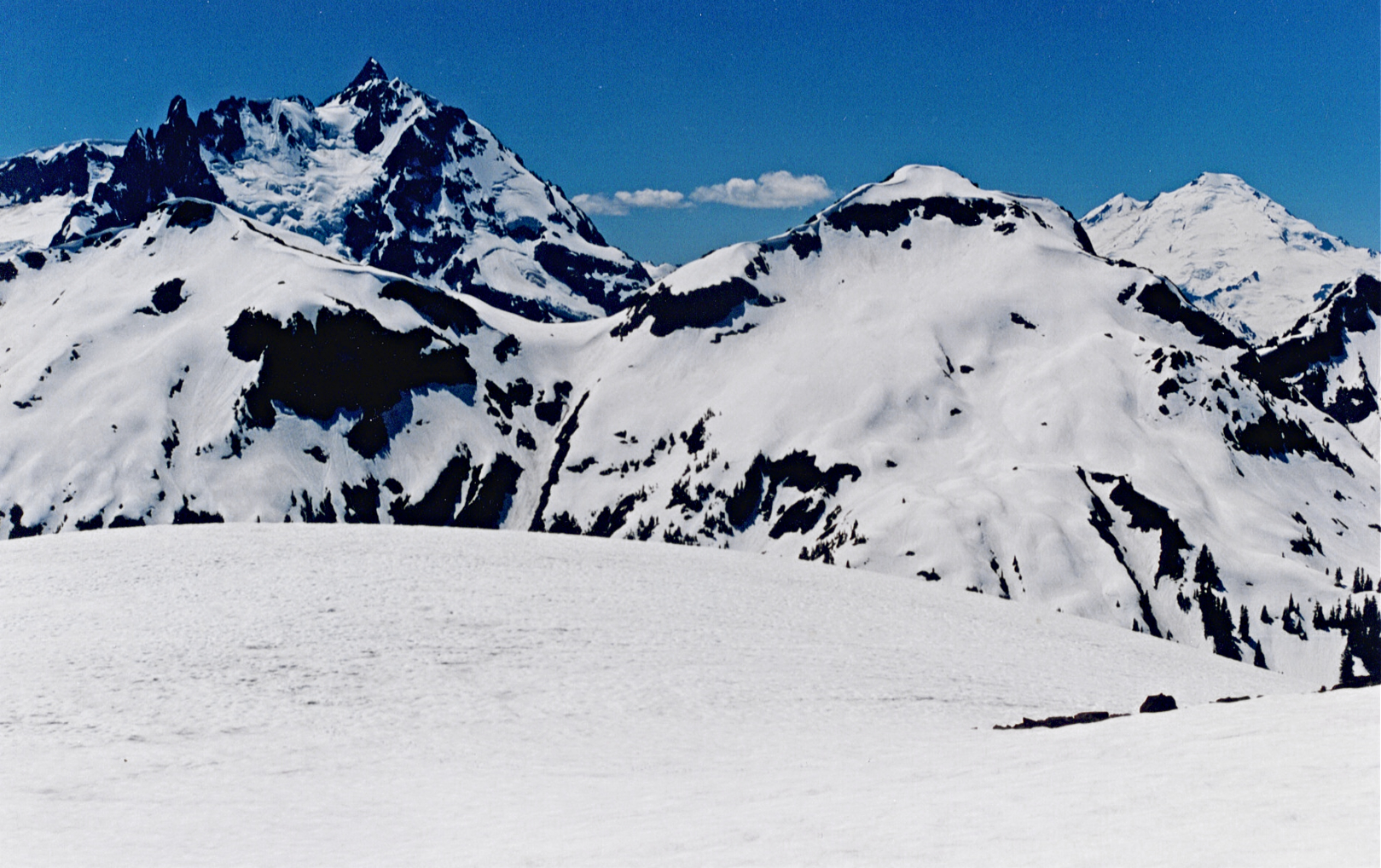
Mts. Shuksan and Baker from Hannegan Peak

The history of the formation of the Cascade Mountains dates back millions of years ago to the late Eocene Epoch. With the North American Plate overriding the Pacific Plate, episodes of volcanic igneous activity persisted. Remnants of the Hannegan caldera can be seen on the eroded southeast face of Hannegan Peak. The caldera erupted four million years ago during the Pliocene epoch, and was a precursor to the volcanism of Mt. Baker. In addition, small fragments of the oceanic and continental lithosphere called terranes created the North Cascades about 50 million years ago.

During the Pleistocene period dating back over two million years ago, glaciation advancing and retreating repeatedly scoured the landscape leaving deposits of rock debris. The U-shaped cross section of the river valleys is a result of recent glaciation. Uplift and faulting in combination with glaciation have been the dominant processes which have created the tall peaks and deep valleys of the North Cascades area.

== Gallery ==
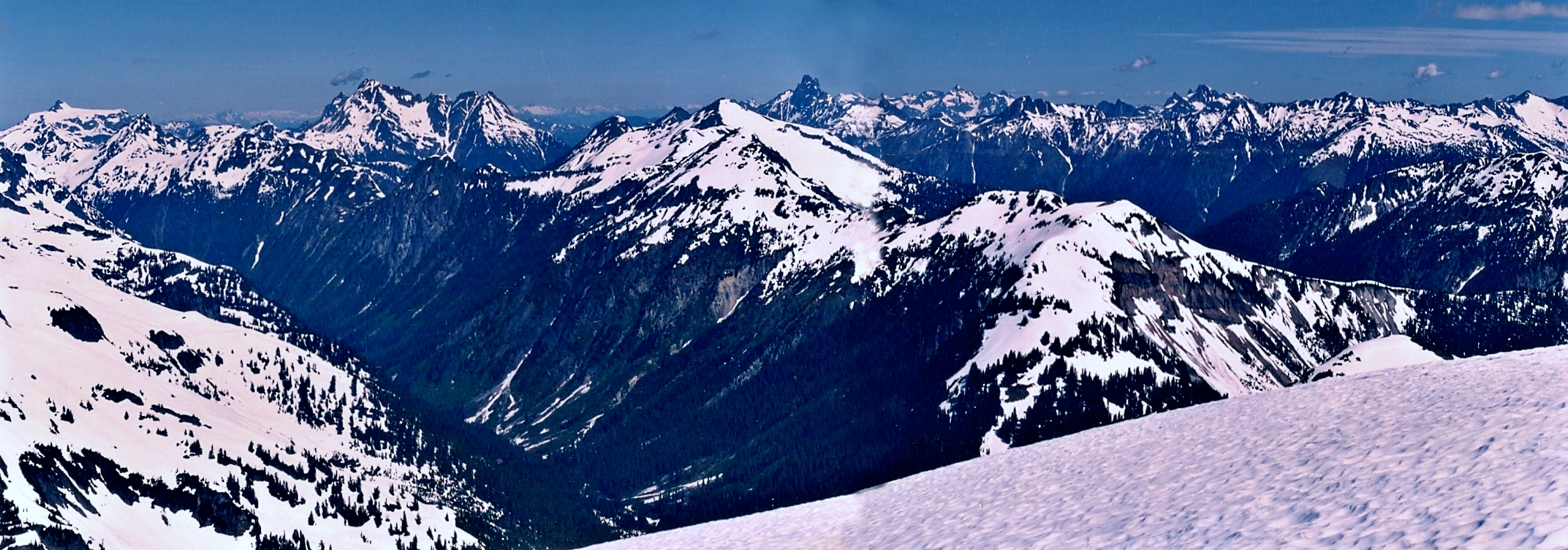
From Ruth Mountain with Hannegan Peak right of center. (also Tomyhoi, Larrabee, Chardonnay, Slesse, Rexford)

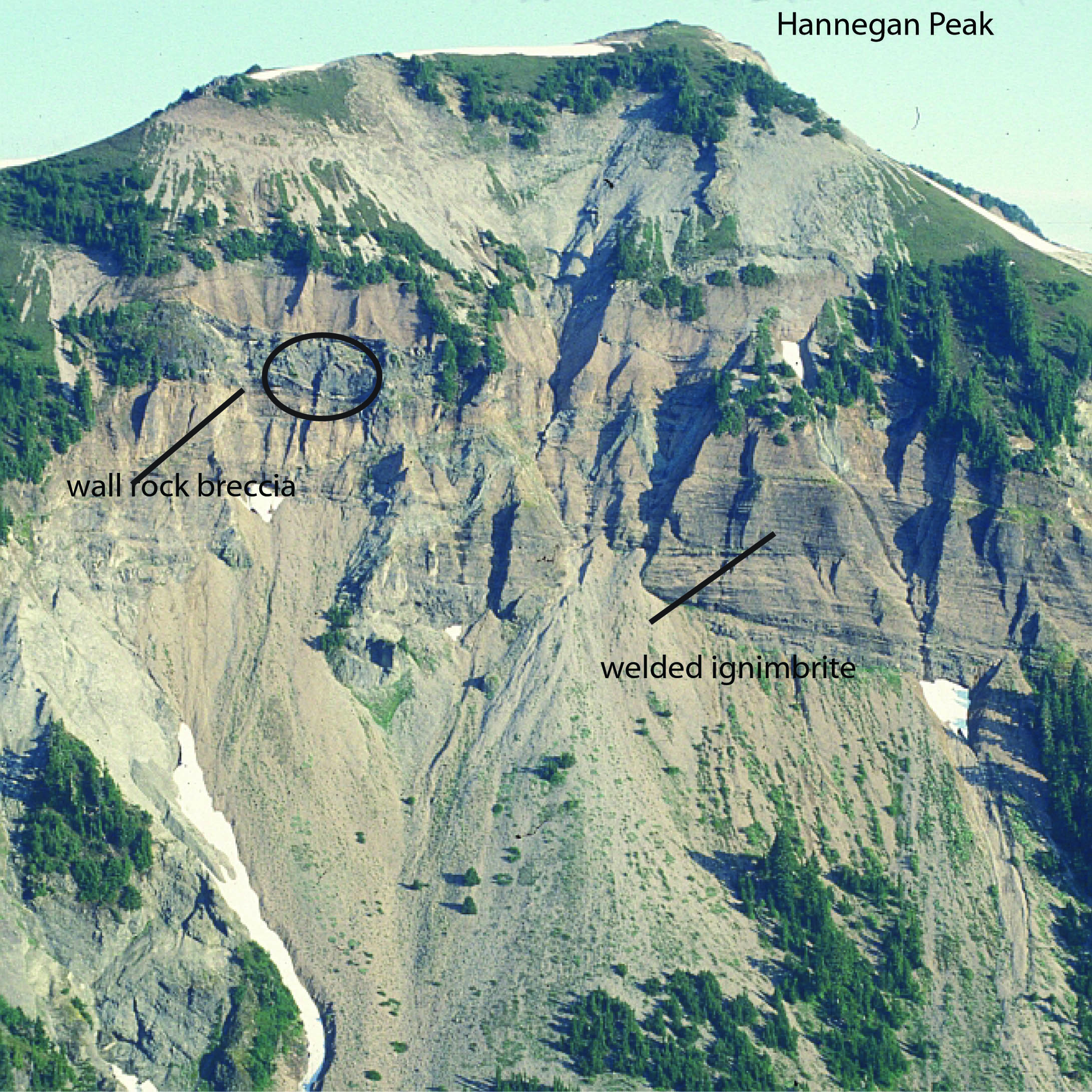
South face

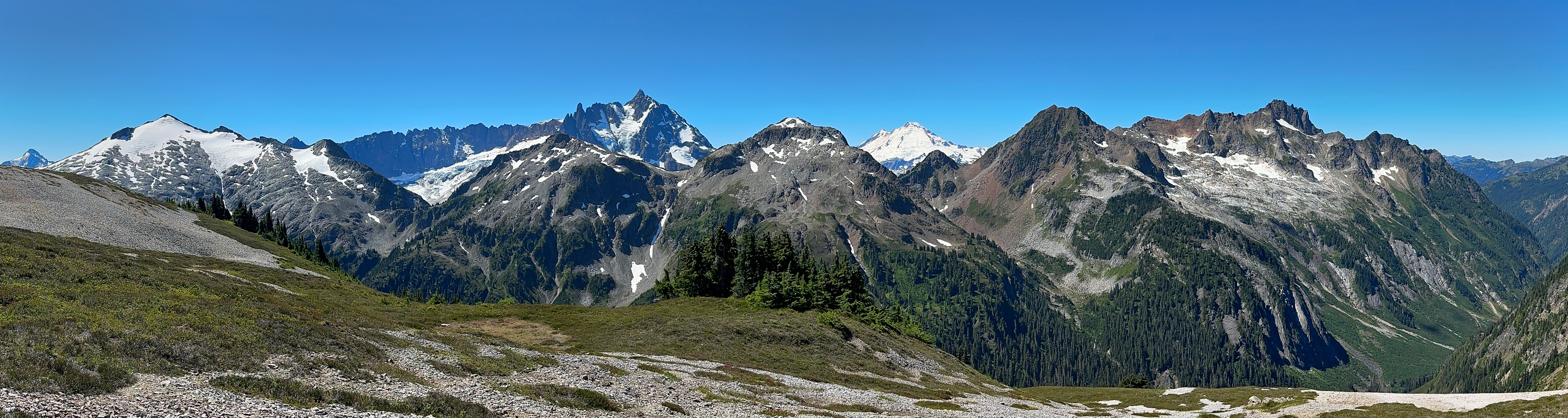
Vista from Hannegan Peak featuring Ruth Mountain, Mount Shuksan, Mount Baker, and Mount Sefrit

== See also ==
- Geology of the Pacific Northwest
- Geography of the North Cascades
