= Trico Mountain =

Mountain in Washington, United States of America

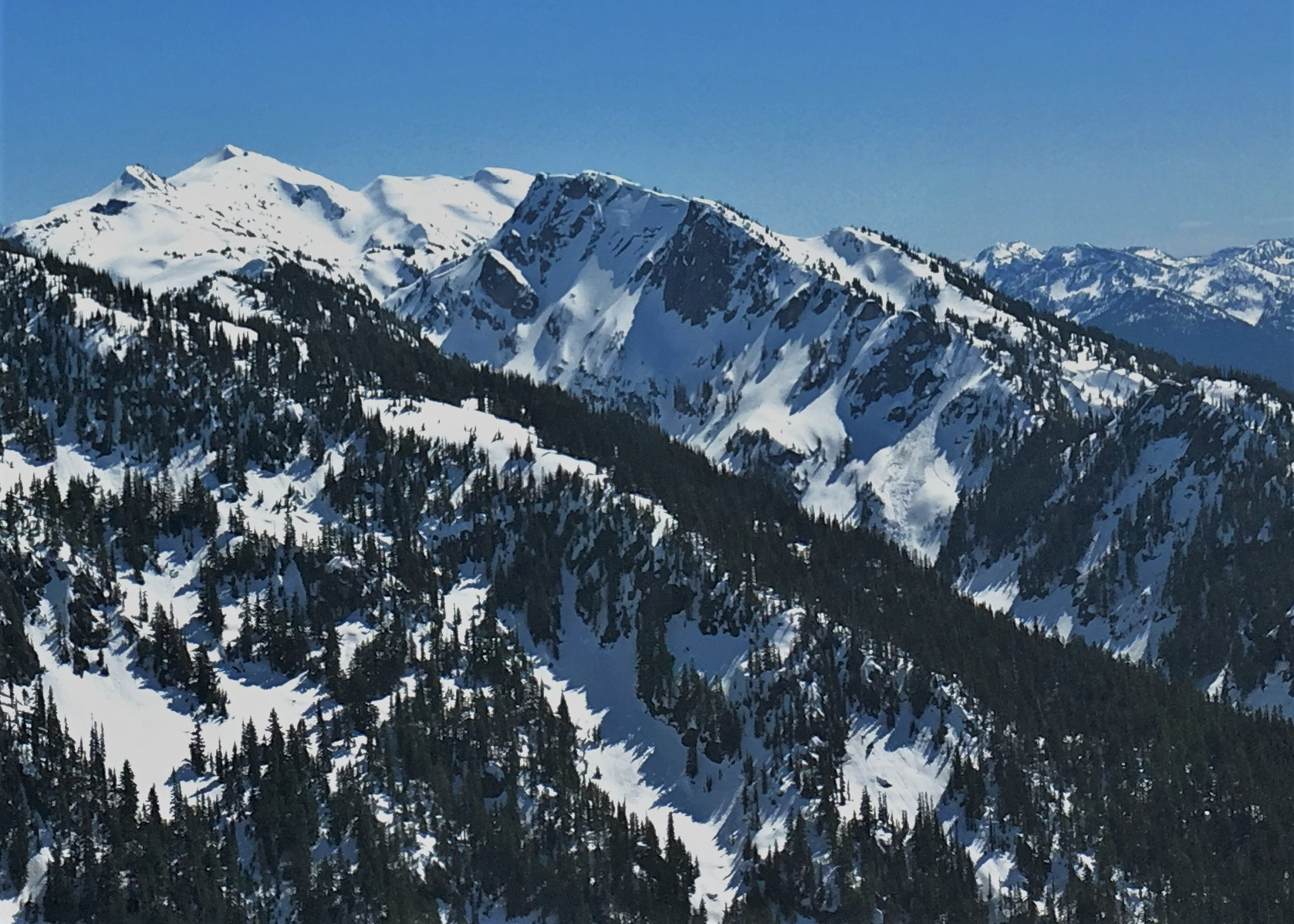
- Trico Mountain centered North aspect from Mac Peak (Granite Mountain upper left)

Highest point
- Elevation: 6,640 ft (2,020 m)
- Prominence: 360 ft (110 m)
- Parent peak: Granite Mountain (7,144 ft)
- Isolation: 1.11 mi (1.79 km)
- Coordinates: 47°35′50″N 121°06′49″W

Geography
- Location within Washington (state) Location within the United States
- Country: United States
- State: Washington
- County: King / Kittitas / Chelan
- Protected area: Alpine Lakes Wilderness
- Parent range: Wenatchee Mountains; Cascade Range
- Topo map: USGS The Cradle

Geology
- Rock age: Late Cretaceous
- Rock type: Tonalitic plutons

Climbing
- Easiest route: scrambling from Robin Lakes

Trico Mountain is a 6,640+ ft (2,020+ m) mountain summit located 10 mi (16 km) south of Stevens Pass on the common border of King County, Kittitas County and Chelan County in Washington state. "Trico" is a portmanteau of triple county. This peak is part of the Wenatchee Mountains, which are a subset of the Cascade Range, and is situated 20 mi (32 km) west of Leavenworth in the Alpine Lakes Wilderness. Trico is a triple divide peak with precipitation runoff from the mountain draining south into Cle Elum River, northwest into Deception Creek, and northeast into Leland Creek, which is a tributary of Icicle Creek. The scenic Tuck and Robin Lakes are set on the south slopes, between Trico and Granite Mountain, which is 1.6 mi (2.6 km) to the southeast. The Pacific Crest Trail skirts below the western aspect this peak as it crosses Deception Pass.

== Climate ==
Weather fronts originating in the Pacific Ocean travel northeast toward the Cascade Mountains. As fronts approach, they are forced upward by the peaks of the Cascade Range, causing them to drop their moisture in the form of rain or snow onto the Cascades (Orographic lift). As a result, the west side of the Cascades experiences high precipitation, especially during the winter months in the form of snowfall. During winter months, weather is usually cloudy, but due to high pressure systems over the Pacific Ocean that intensify during summer months, there is often little or no cloud cover during the summer. The months of July through September offer the most favorable weather for viewing or climbing this peak.

== Geology ==
The Alpine Lakes Wilderness features some of the most rugged topography in the Cascade Range with craggy peaks and ridges, deep glacial valleys, and granite walls spotted with over 700 mountain lakes. Geological events occurring many years ago created the diverse topography and drastic elevation changes over the Cascade Range leading to the various climate differences.

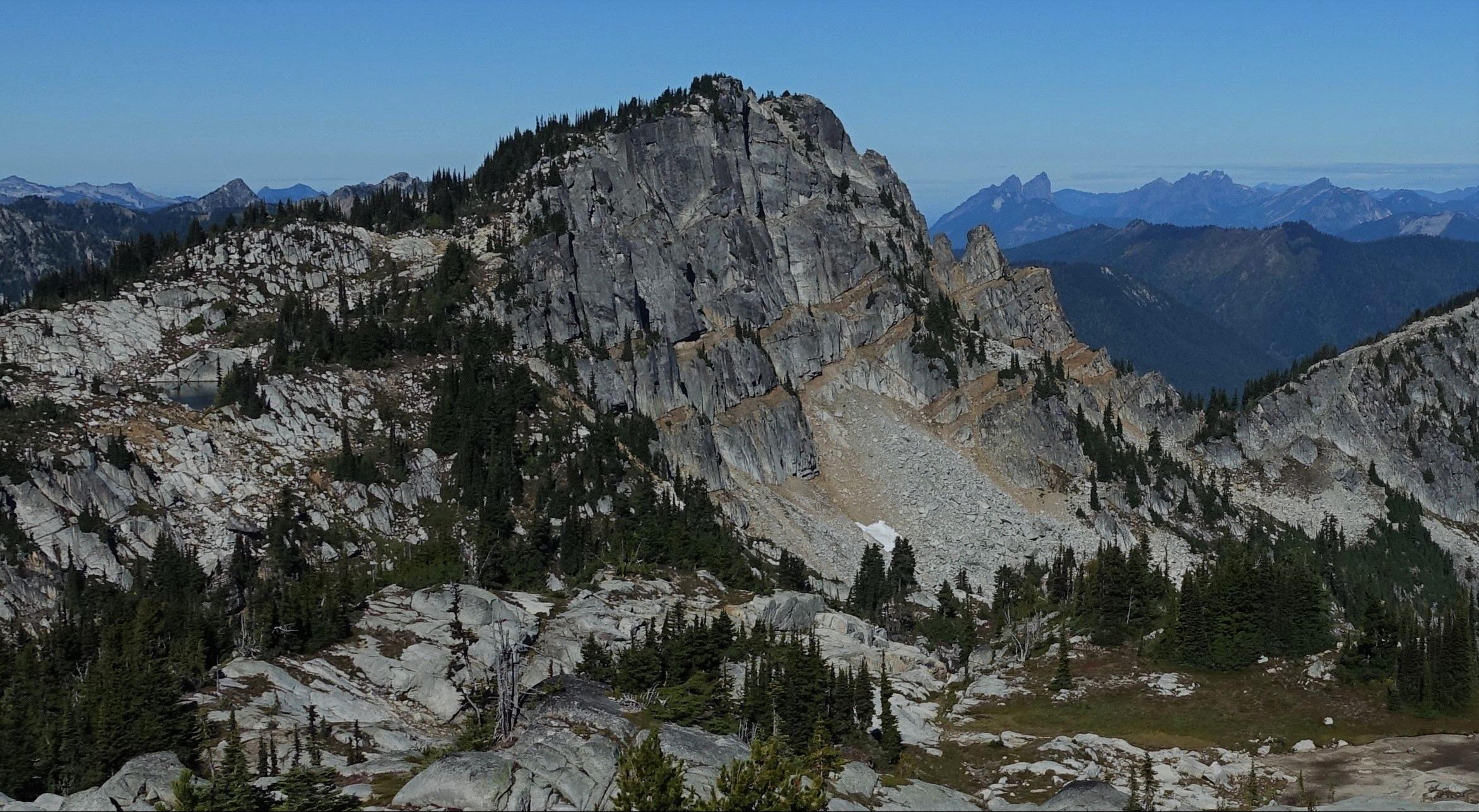
Trico's southeast aspect

The history of the formation of the Cascade Mountains dates back millions of years ago to the late Eocene Epoch. With the North American Plate overriding the Pacific Plate, episodes of volcanic igneous activity persisted. In addition, small fragments of the oceanic and continental lithosphere called terranes created the North Cascades about 50 million years ago.

During the Pleistocene period dating back over two million years ago, glaciation advancing and retreating repeatedly scoured and shaped the landscape. The last glacial retreat in the Alpine Lakes area began about 14,000 years ago and was north of the Canada–US border by 10,000 years ago. The U-shaped cross section of the river valleys is a result of that recent glaciation. Uplift and faulting in combination with glaciation have been the dominant processes which have created the tall peaks and deep valleys of the Alpine Lakes Wilderness area.

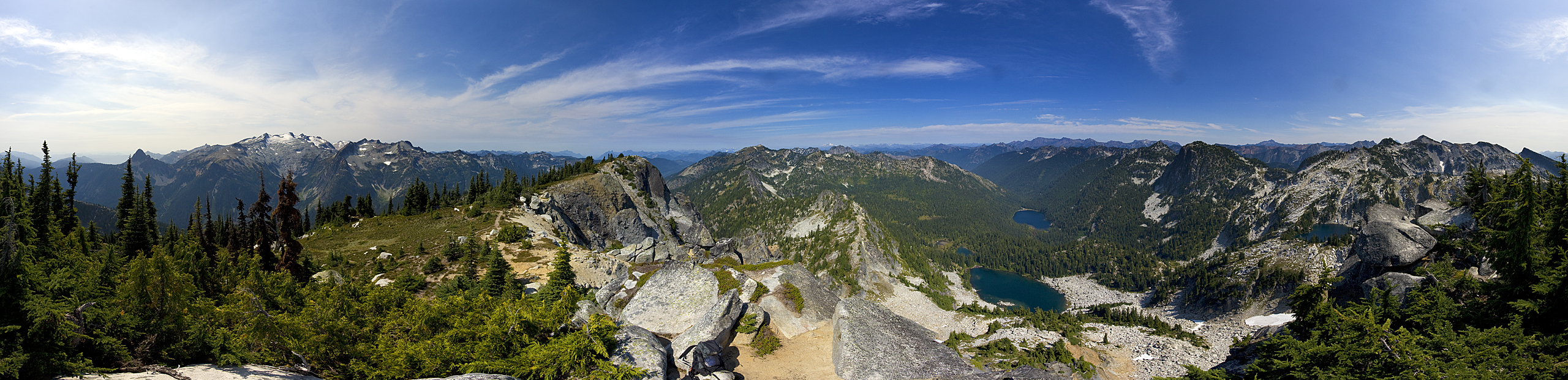
View from Trico Mountain with Lake Phoebe and French Ridge to right, Mt Daniel on left horizon

== See also ==
- List of peaks of the Alpine Lakes Wilderness
