= Granite Peak =

Mountains named Granite Peak or variations.

== Canada ==
In Canada, according to NRCan CGNDB:

Name	CGNDB link	Province	Region	NTS map	Coordinates
Granite Peak		British Columbia	East Kootenay	082K07	50°27′00″N 116°35′00″W
Granite Peak		British Columbia	Bute Inlet	092K10	50°43′00″N 124°58′00″W

== United States ==
In the United States, according to USGS GNIS:

Name	USGS link	State	County	Coordinates
Granite Peak		Alaska	Matanuska-Susitna	61°47′50″N 148°53′00″W
Granite Peak		Alaska	Valdez-Cordova	61°44′45″N 143°51′39″W
Granite Peak		Arizona	Cochise	31°24′42″N 110°19′41″W
Granite Peak		Arizona	Cochise	31°46′30″N 110°26′16″W
Granite Peak		Arizona	Gila	33°36′24″N 110°50′01″W
Granite Peak		Arizona	Graham	33°02′40″N 110°17′08″W
Granite Peak		Arizona	Mohave	34°46′08″N 113°51′10″W
Granite Peak		Arizona	Yavapai	34°16′24″N 111°53′37″W
Granite Peak		California	San Bernardino	34°47′37″N 115°41′40″W
Granite Peak		California	San Bernardino	34°17′51″N 116°43′33″W
Granite Peak		California	Sierra	39°29′25″N 120°02′33″W
Granite Peak		California	Trinity	40°54′37″N 122°52′16″W
Granite Peak		Colorado	Hinsdale	37°28′08″N 107°24′39″W
Granite Peak		Colorado	Hinsdale	37°36′16″N 107°20′27″W
Granite Peak		Idaho	Clearwater	46°42′57″N 114°42′44″W
Granite Peak		Idaho	Idaho	45°51′33″N 115°05′26″W
Granite Peak		Idaho	Shoshone	47°00′41″N 115°26′55″W
Granite Peak		Idaho	Shoshone	47°33′46″N 115°45′34″W
Granite Peak		Idaho	Valley	44°25′28″N 116°08′27″W
Granite Peak		Montana	Madison	45°33′56″N 112°02′32″W
Granite Peak		Montana	Mineral	46°42′59″N 114°42′40″W
Granite Peak		Montana	Park	45°09′48″N 109°48′26″W
Granite Peak		Montana	Park	46°02′15″N 110°18′13″W
Granite Peak		New Mexico	Doña Ana	32°19′55″N 106°31′13″W
Granite Peak		New Mexico	Grant	33°11′31″N 108°22′27″W
Granite Peak		New Mexico	Hidalgo	32°06′29″N 108°59′40″W
Granite Peak		New Mexico	Sierra	33°00′06″N 107°45′35″W
Granite Peak		New Mexico	Sierra	33°10′45″N 107°30′30″W
Granite Peak		Nevada	Douglas	38°50′18″N 119°30′05″W
Granite Peak		Nevada	Elko	41°42′15″N 114°41′20″W
Granite Peak		Nevada	Humboldt	41°10′56″N 117°44′59″W
Granite Peak		Nevada	Humboldt	41°40′07″N 117°35′21″W
Granite Peak		Nevada	Pershing	40°16′42″N 117°47′35″W
Granite Peak		Nevada	Washoe	39°38′03″N 119°55′37″W
Granite Peak		Nevada	Washoe	39°50′41″N 119°53′19″W
Granite Peak		Nevada	Washoe	40°47′22″N 119°25′46″W
Granite Peak		Nevada	White Pine	38°50′38″N 114°15′16″W
Granite Peak		Oregon	Coos	42°45′11″N 124°08′21″W
Granite Peak		South Dakota	Meade	44°23′30″N 103°34′09″W
Granite Peak		Utah	Beaver	38°22′58″N 112°48′53″W
Granite Peak		Utah	Tooele	40°07′41″N 113°16′14″W
Granite Peak		Washington	Pend Oreille	48°36′51″N 117°25′55″W
Granite Peak		Wyoming	Fremont	42°33′00″N 108°52′47″W

== See also ==
- Granite Mountain (disambiguation)
- Granite Mountains (disambiguation)
