= Thor Peak =

Thor Peak may refer to:

- Mount Thor, Nunavut (or Baffin Island), Canada
- Thor Peak (California)
- Thor Peak (Washington)
- Thor Peak (Wyoming)

== See also ==
- Mount Thor (disambiguation)
