= Mount Thor (disambiguation) =

Mount Thor is a mountain in Auyuittuq National Park, Nunavut, Canada.

Mount Thor may also refer to:

- Mount Thor (Alaska)
- Mount Thor (Antarctica)
- Thor (volcano), on Jupiter's moon Io

== See also ==
- Thor (disambiguation)
- Thor Peak (disambiguation)
