= Thor Peak (Washington) =

Mountain in Chelan County, Washington, United States

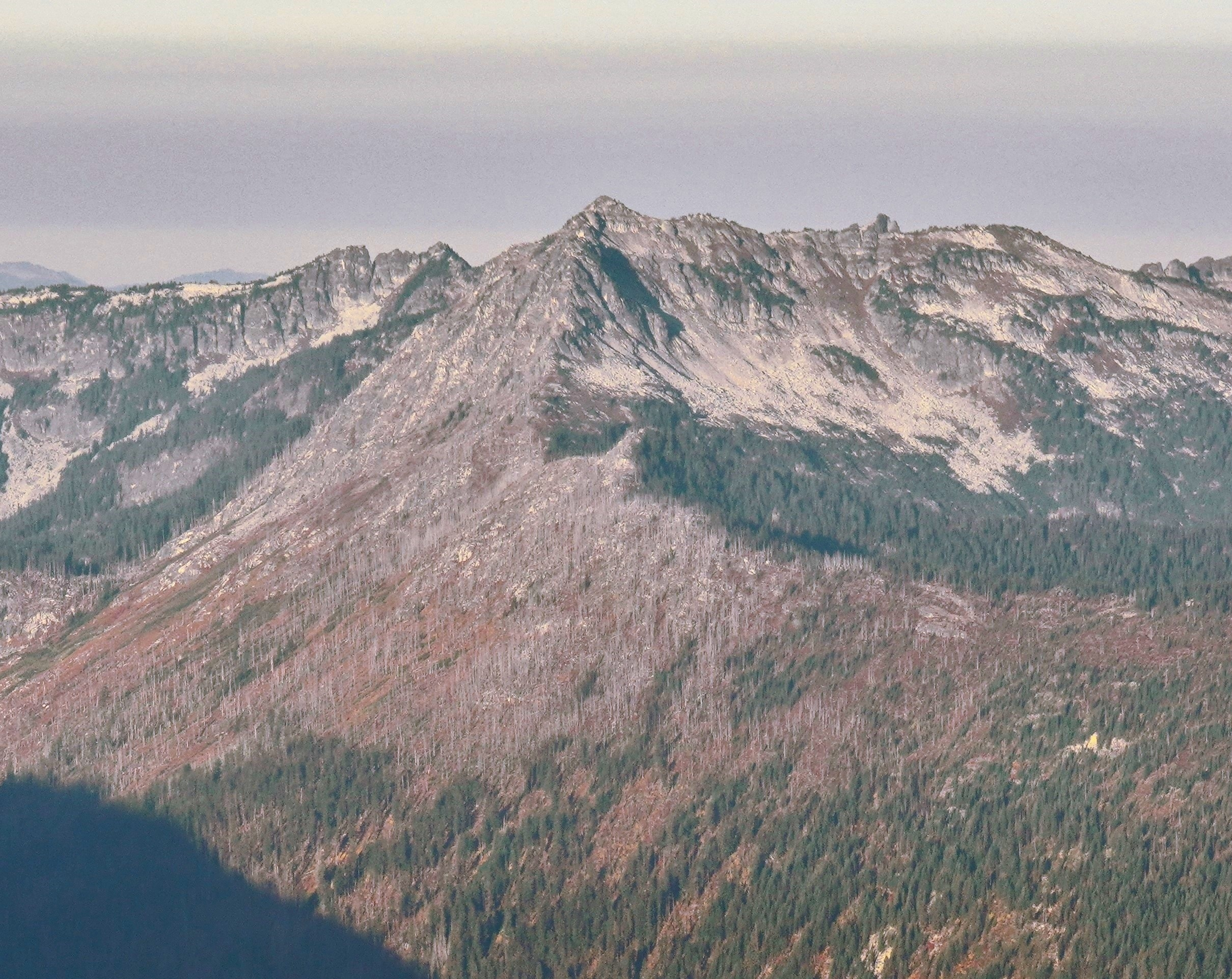
- East aspect

Highest point
- Elevation: 6,804 ft (2,074 m)
- Prominence: 1,044 ft (318 m)
- Parent peak: Mac Peak (6,859 ft)
- Isolation: 2.27 mi (3.65 km)
- Coordinates: 47°39′30″N 121°06′27″W

Naming
- Etymology: Thor

Geography
- Location within Washington (state) Location within the United States
- Country: United States
- State: Washington
- County: Chelan
- Protected area: Alpine Lakes Wilderness
- Parent range: Wenatchee Mountains; Cascade Range
- Topo map: USGS Stevens Pass

Geology
- Rock age: Late Cretaceous
- Rock type: Tonalitic plutons

Thor Peak is a 6,804-foot-elevation (2,074-meter) mountain summit in Chelan County, Washington, United States.

== Description ==
Thor Peak is part of the Wenatchee Mountains which are a subrange of the Cascade Range. It is situated six miles (9.7 km) south of Stevens Pass and one mile east of the Cascade crest. Thor Peak is in the Alpine Lakes Wilderness on land managed by the Okanogan–Wenatchee National Forest. Precipitation runoff from the peak drains into Trapper and Prospect creeks which are tributaries of Icicle Creek, which in turn is a tributary of the Wenatchee River. Topographic relief is significant as the summit rises 2,800 feet (853 meters) above Prospect Creek in 0.65 mile (1 km). The nearest higher neighbor is Mac Peak, 1.86 mi (2.99 km) to the south-southwest. This mountain's toponym has not been officially adopted by the United States Board on Geographic Names, and it will remain unofficial as long as the USGS policy of not adopting new toponyms in designated wilderness areas remains in effect. However, it is labeled as "6804" on USGS topographical maps, which corresponds to its elevation. Thor Peak is set immediately east of Thunder Mountain and Thunder Mountain Lakes. Thor is the hammer-wielding god associated with thunder in Norse mythology.

== Climate ==
Weather fronts originating in the Pacific Ocean travel east toward the Cascade Mountains. As fronts approach, they are forced upward by the peaks (orographic lift), causing them to drop their moisture in the form of rain or snowfall onto the Cascades. As a result, the Cascades experience high precipitation, especially during the winter months in the form of snowfall. During winter months, weather is usually cloudy, but due to high pressure systems over the Pacific Ocean that intensify during summer months, there is often little or no cloud cover during the summer.

== Geology ==
The Alpine Lakes Wilderness features some of the most rugged topography in the Cascade Range with craggy peaks and ridges, deep glacial valleys, and granite walls spotted with over 700 mountain lakes. Geological events occurring many years ago created the diverse topography and drastic elevation changes over the Cascade Range leading to the various climate differences. Glacier Peak, a stratovolcano that is 31 mi (50 km) north of Thor Peak, began forming in the mid-Pleistocene.

During the Pleistocene period dating back over two million years ago, glaciation advancing and retreating repeatedly scoured the landscape leaving deposits of rock debris. The last glacial retreat in the Alpine Lakes area began about 14,000 years ago and was north of the Canada–US border by 10,000 years ago. The U-shaped cross section of the river valleys is a result of that recent glaciation. Uplift and faulting in combination with glaciation have been the dominant processes which have created the tall peaks and deep valleys of the Alpine Lakes Wilderness area.

== See also ==
- List of peaks of the Alpine Lakes Wilderness
- Geology of the Pacific Northwest
