= Hope Mountain (British Columbia) =

Mountain in British Columbia, Canada

- Location within British Columbia
- Interactive map of Hope Mountain

Highest point
- Elevation: 1,844 m (6,050 ft)
- Prominence: 414 m (1,358 ft)
- Coordinates: 49°20′51″N 121°25′04″W

Geography
- Location: Hope, British Columbia, Canada
- District: Yale Division Yale Land District
- Parent range: Skagit Range
- Topo map: NTS 92H6 Hope

Hope Mountain, commonly called Mount Hope, is a prominent mountain overlooking the town of Hope, British Columbia, Canada from the south. It is the northernmost summit of the Skagit Range of the Cascade Mountains and stands above the confluence of the Coquihalla and Fraser Rivers. Hope Mountain dominates the view of southbound travellers in the lower Fraser Canyon between Yale and Hope.
