= Granite Mountain (Wenatchee Mountains) =

Mountain in Washington (state), United States

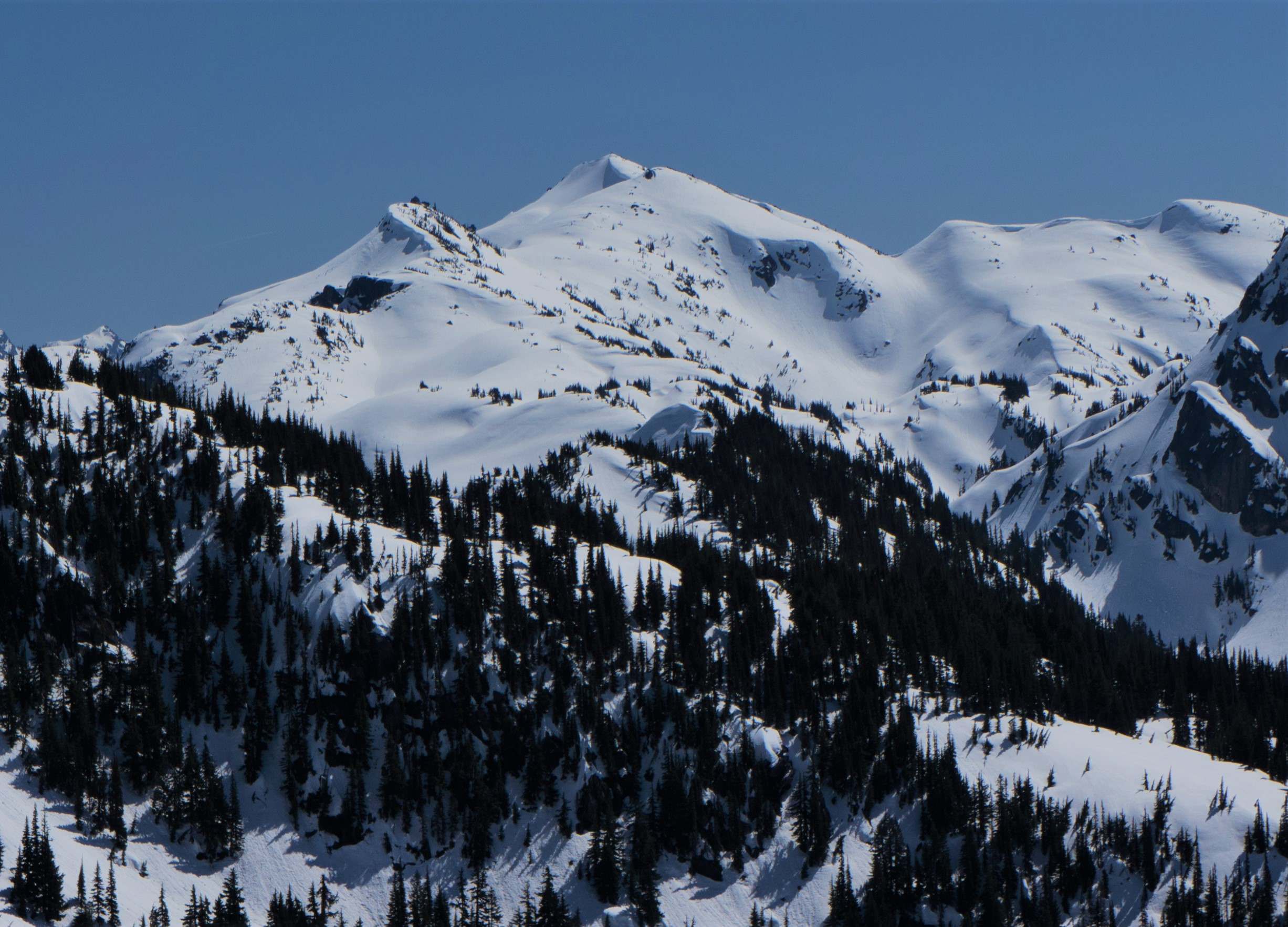
- North aspect from Mac Peak

Highest point
- Elevation: 7,144 ft (2,177 m)
- Prominence: 1,064 ft (324 m)
- Parent peak: The Cradle (7,467 ft)
- Isolation: 3.03 mi (4.88 km)
- Coordinates: 47°34′51″N 121°05′27″W

Geography
- Location within Washington (state) Location within the United States
- Country: United States
- State: Washington
- County: Chelan / Kittitas
- Protected area: Alpine Lakes Wilderness
- Parent range: Wenatchee Mountains; Cascade Range
- Topo map: USGS The Cradle

Geology
- Rock age: Late Cretaceous
- Rock type: Tonalitic plutons

Climbing
- Easiest route: scrambling from Robin Lakes

Granite Mountain is a 7,144-foot (2,177-metre) double summit mountain located 11.5 mi (18.5 km) south of Stevens Pass on the common border of Kittitas County and Chelan County in Washington state. It's part of the Wenatchee Mountains, which are a subset of the Cascade Range, and is situated 19 mi (31 km) west of Leavenworth in the Alpine Lakes Wilderness, on land managed by the Okanogan–Wenatchee National Forest. Granite Mountain is the highest point on the Hyas Lake-French Creek divide with precipitation runoff from the mountain draining west into Cle Elum River, or east into French Creek, a tributary of Icicle Creek. Its subsidiary 7,080-ft South Peak is positioned half a mile to the south-southeast, the nearest higher neighbor is The Cradle, 3 mi (4.8 km) to the southeast, and Mac Peak is set 3.6 mi (5.8 km) to the north-northwest. The Pacific Crest Trail skirts below the western base this peak.

== Climate ==
Weather fronts originating in the Pacific Ocean travel northeast toward the Cascade Mountains. As fronts approach, they are forced upward by the peaks of the Cascade Range, causing them to drop their moisture in the form of rain or snowfall onto the Cascades (Orographic lift). As a result, the west side of the Cascades experiences high precipitation, especially during the winter months in the form of snowfall. During winter months, weather is usually cloudy, but due to high pressure systems over the Pacific Ocean that intensify during summer months, there is often little or no cloud cover during the summer. The months June through September offer the most favorable weather for viewing or climbing this peak.

== Geology ==
The Alpine Lakes Wilderness features some of the most rugged topography in the Cascade Range with craggy peaks and ridges, deep glacial valleys, and granite walls spotted with over 700 mountain lakes. Geological events occurring many years ago created the diverse topography and drastic elevation changes over the Cascade Range leading to the various climate differences.

The history of the formation of the Cascade Mountains dates back millions of years ago to the late Eocene Epoch. With the North American Plate overriding the Pacific Plate, episodes of volcanic igneous activity persisted. In addition, small fragments of the oceanic and continental lithosphere called terranes created the North Cascades about 50 million years ago.

During the Pleistocene period dating back over two million years ago, glaciation advancing and retreating repeatedly scoured and shaped the landscape. The last glacial retreat in the Alpine Lakes area began about 14,000 years ago and was north of the Canada–US border by 10,000 years ago. The U-shaped cross section of the river valleys is a result of that recent glaciation. Uplift and faulting in combination with glaciation have been the dominant processes which have created the tall peaks and deep valleys of the Alpine Lakes Wilderness area.

== See also ==
- List of peaks of the Alpine Lakes Wilderness
- Granite Mountain (King County, Washington)
- Granite Mountain (Whatcom County, Washington)
- Granite Mountain (Washington), ten peaks
