= Mount Sefrit =

Mountain in Washington (state), United States

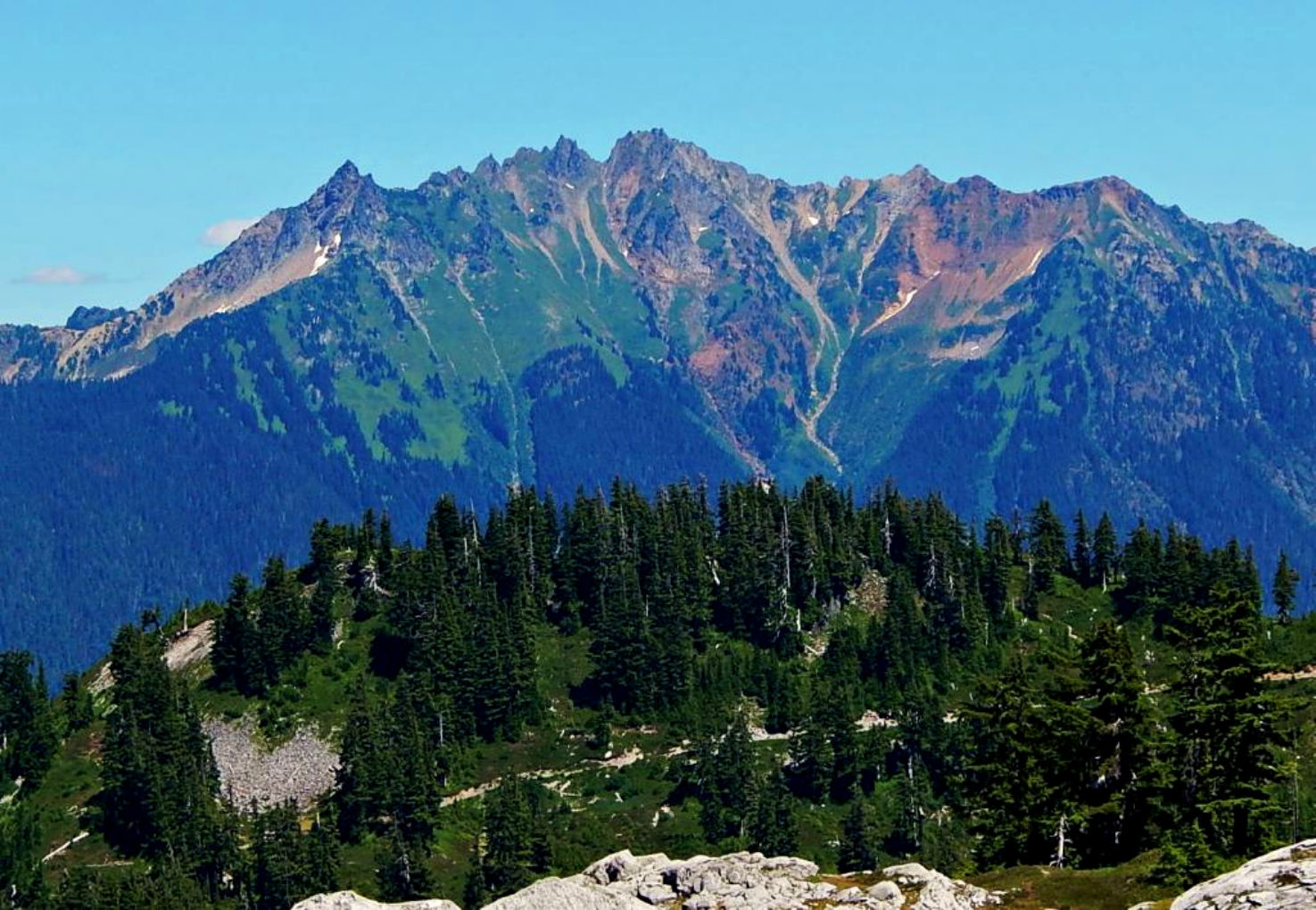
- Mount Sefrit seen from Artist Point

Highest point
- Elevation: 7,191 ft (2,192 m)
- Prominence: 1,591 ft (485 m)
- Parent peak: Nooksack Tower (8,285 ft)
- Isolation: 3.85 mi (6.20 km)
- Coordinates: 48°53′31″N 121°35′39″W

Geography
- Location within Washington (state) Location within the United States
- Interactive map of Mount Sefrit
- Country: United States
- State: Washington
- County: Whatcom
- Protected area: Mount Baker Wilderness
- Parent range: North Cascades
- Topo map: USGS Mount Sefrit

Geology
- Rock type(s): Gabbro and Greenschist

Climbing
- First ascent: 1930 by Jim Irving and Brick Spouse
- Easiest route: Scrambling

Mount Sefrit is a 7,191 ft (2,190 m) Skagit Range summit located three miles north of Mount Shuksan in the North Cascades of Washington state. It is situated in the Mount Baker Wilderness, which is managed by the Mount Baker-Snoqualmie National Forest. The summit offers views of Mount Shuksan, Mount Baker, and the Picket Range. Mount Sefrit's name honors Frank Ira Sefrit (1867–1950), editor and publisher of The Bellingham Herald for nearly 40 years. This mountain's name was officially adopted in 1952 by the U.S. Board on Geographic Names. Precipitation runoff from the mountain drains into the deep valleys of Ruth Creek and the Nooksack River which nearly encircle Mount Sefrit, except for Nooksack Ridge which connects it to Ruth Mountain.

== Geology ==
The North Cascades features some of the most rugged topography in the Cascade Range with craggy peaks, ridges, and deep glacial valleys. Geological events occurring many years ago created the diverse topography and drastic elevation changes over the Cascade Range leading to the various climate differences. These climate differences lead to vegetation variety defining the ecoregions in this area.

The history of the formation of the Cascade Mountains dates back millions of years ago to the late Eocene Epoch. With the North American Plate overriding the Pacific Plate, episodes of volcanic igneous activity persisted. In addition, small fragments of the oceanic and continental lithosphere called terranes created the North Cascades about 50 million years ago.

During the Pleistocene period dating back over two million years ago, glaciation advancing and retreating repeatedly scoured the landscape leaving deposits of rock debris. The U-shaped cross section of the river valleys is a result of recent glaciation. Uplift and faulting in combination with glaciation have been the dominant processes which have created the tall peaks and deep valleys of the North Cascades area.

== Climate ==
Mount Sefrit is located in the marine west coast climate zone of western North America. Most weather fronts originating in the Pacific Ocean move northeast toward the Cascade Mountains. As fronts approach the North Cascades, they are forced upward by the peaks of the Cascade Range (orographic lift), causing them to drop their moisture in the form of rain or snowfall onto the Cascades. As a result, the west side of the North Cascades experiences high precipitation, especially during the winter months in the form of snowfall. Because of maritime influence, snow tends to be wet and heavy, resulting in high avalanche danger. During winter months, weather is usually cloudy, but, due to high pressure systems over the Pacific Ocean that intensify during summer months, there is often little or no cloud cover during the summer. The months July through September offer the most favorable weather for viewing or climbing this peak.

== Gallery ==
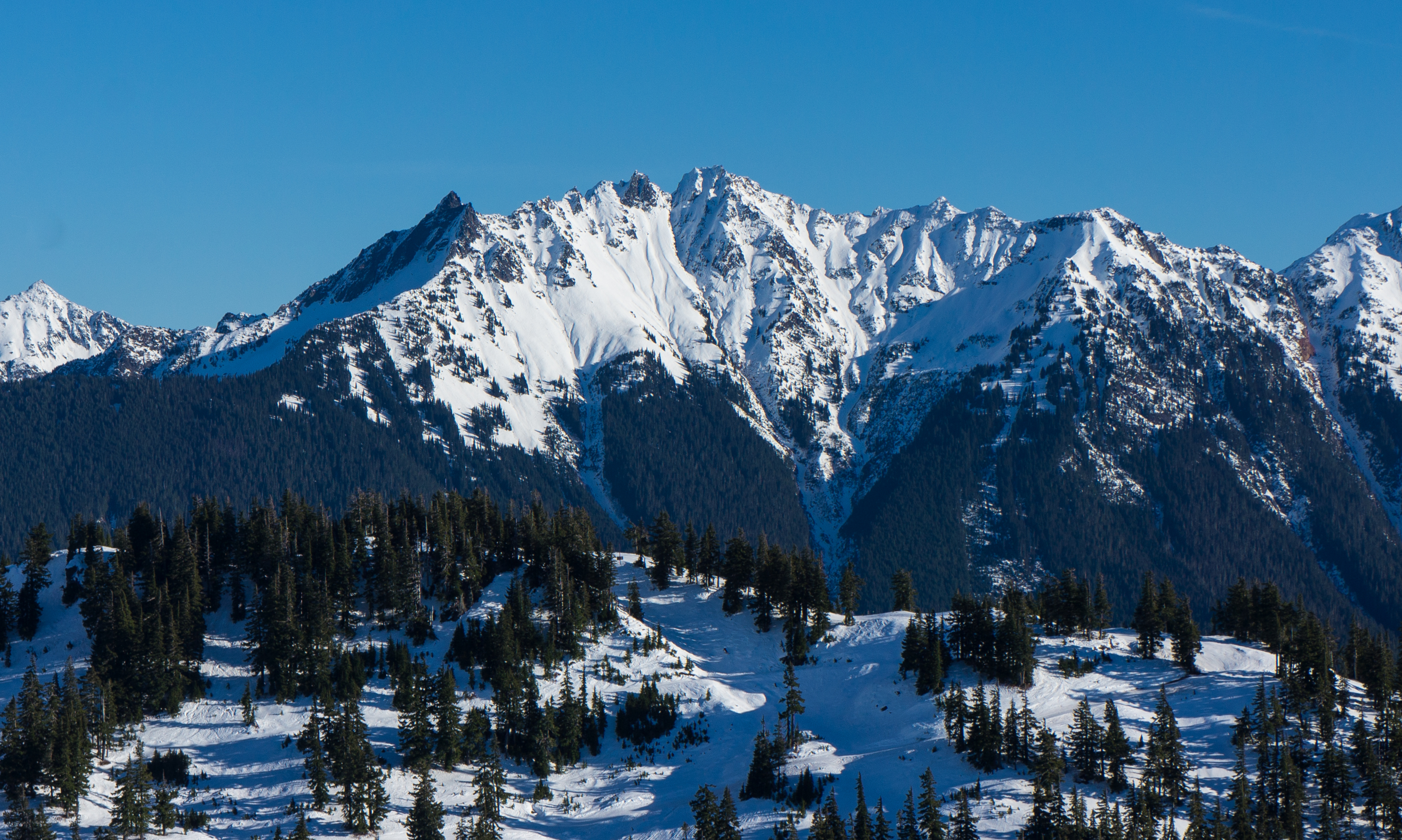
Mt. Sefrit from southwest

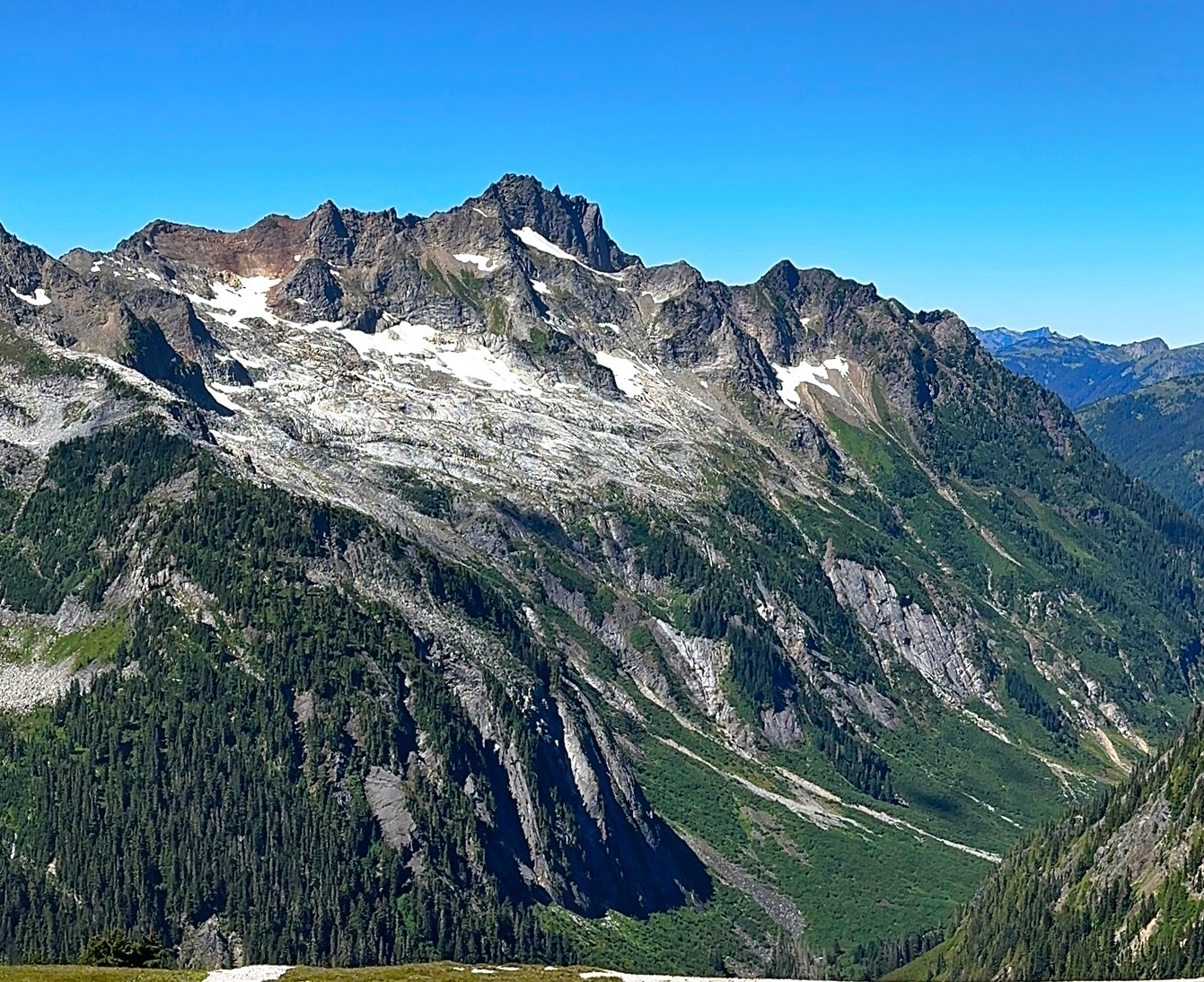
Mt. Sefrit from Hannegan Peak

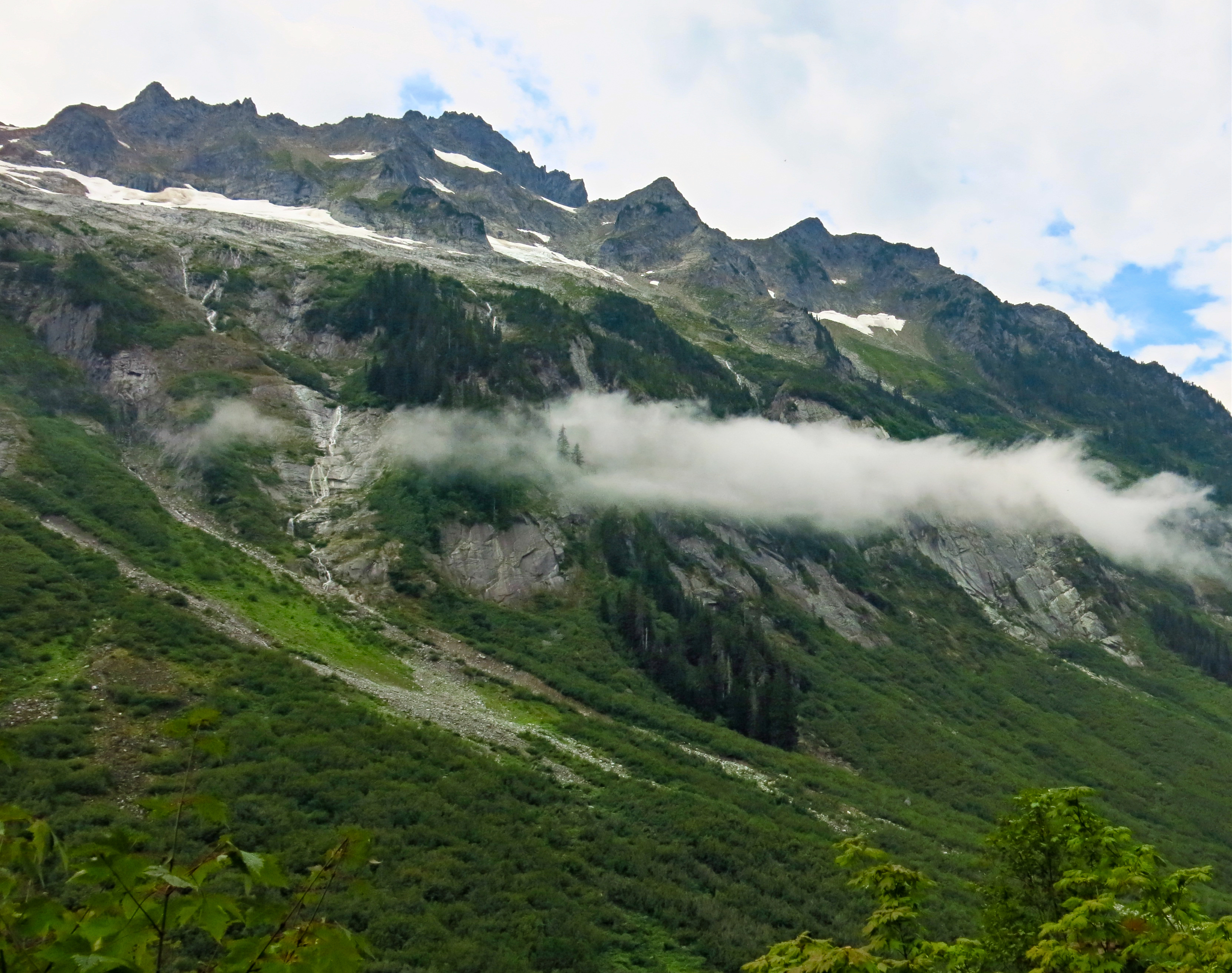
East aspect from Ruth Creek Valley

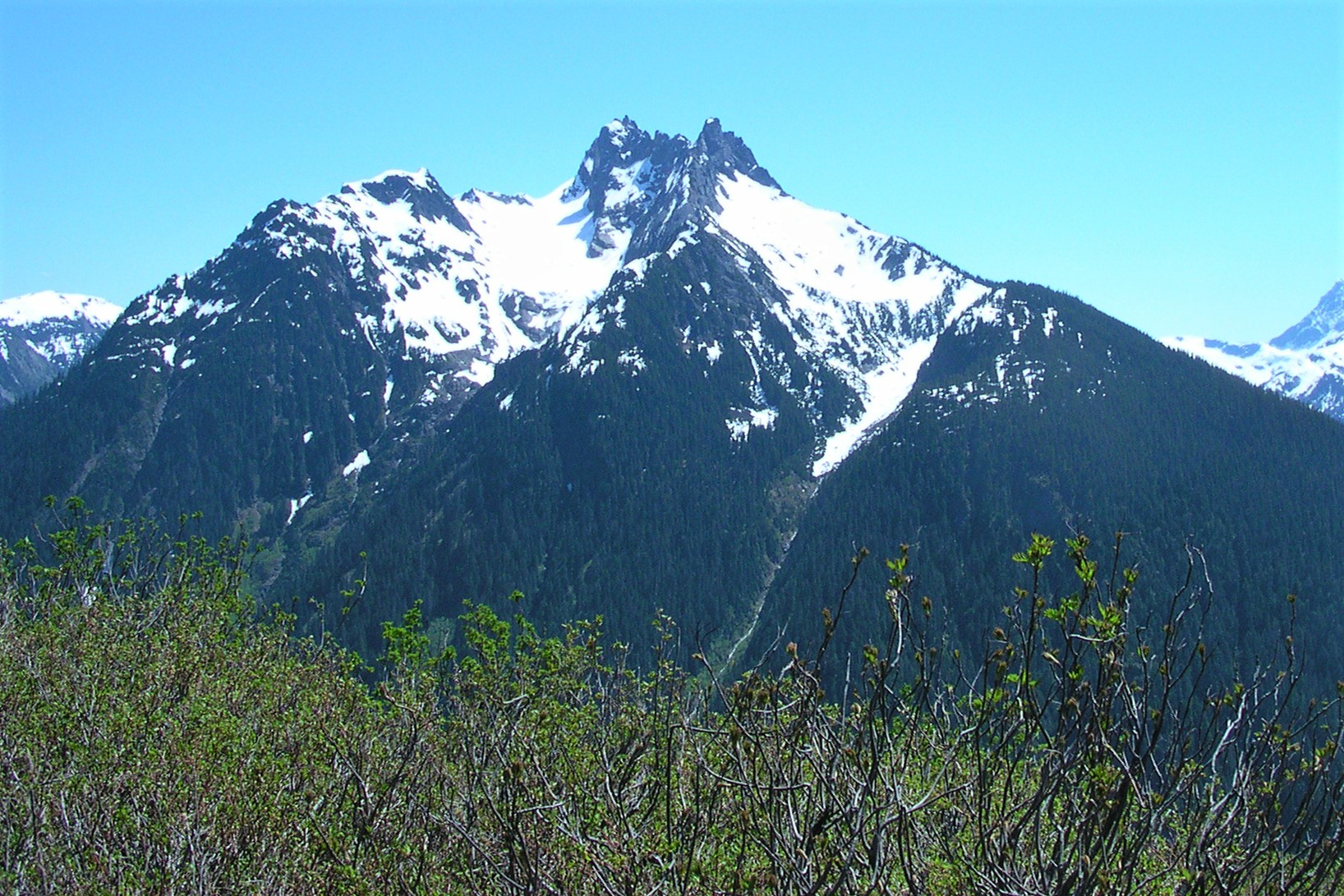
Northwest aspect, from Goat Mountain

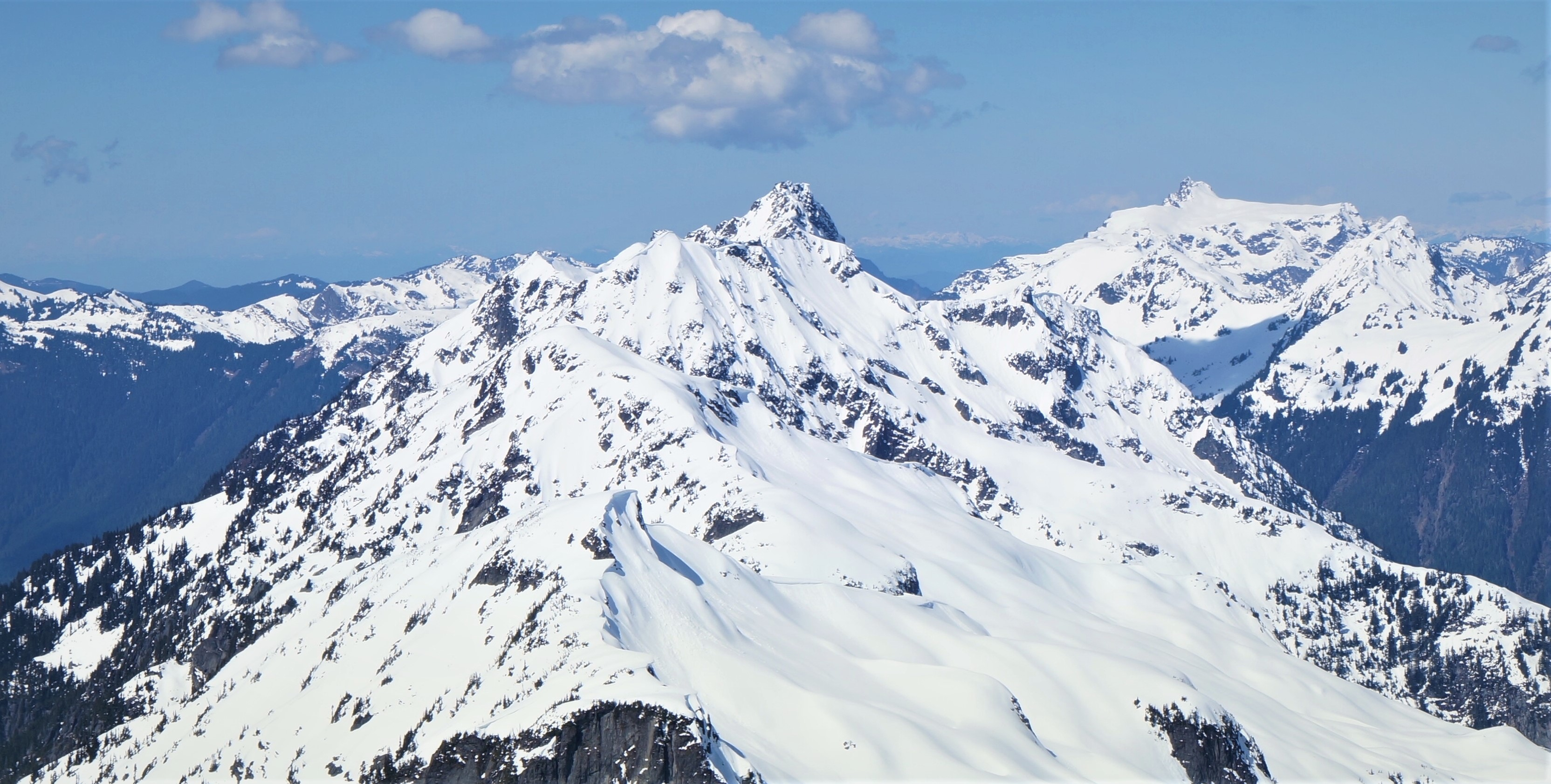
Sefrit from Ruth Mountain

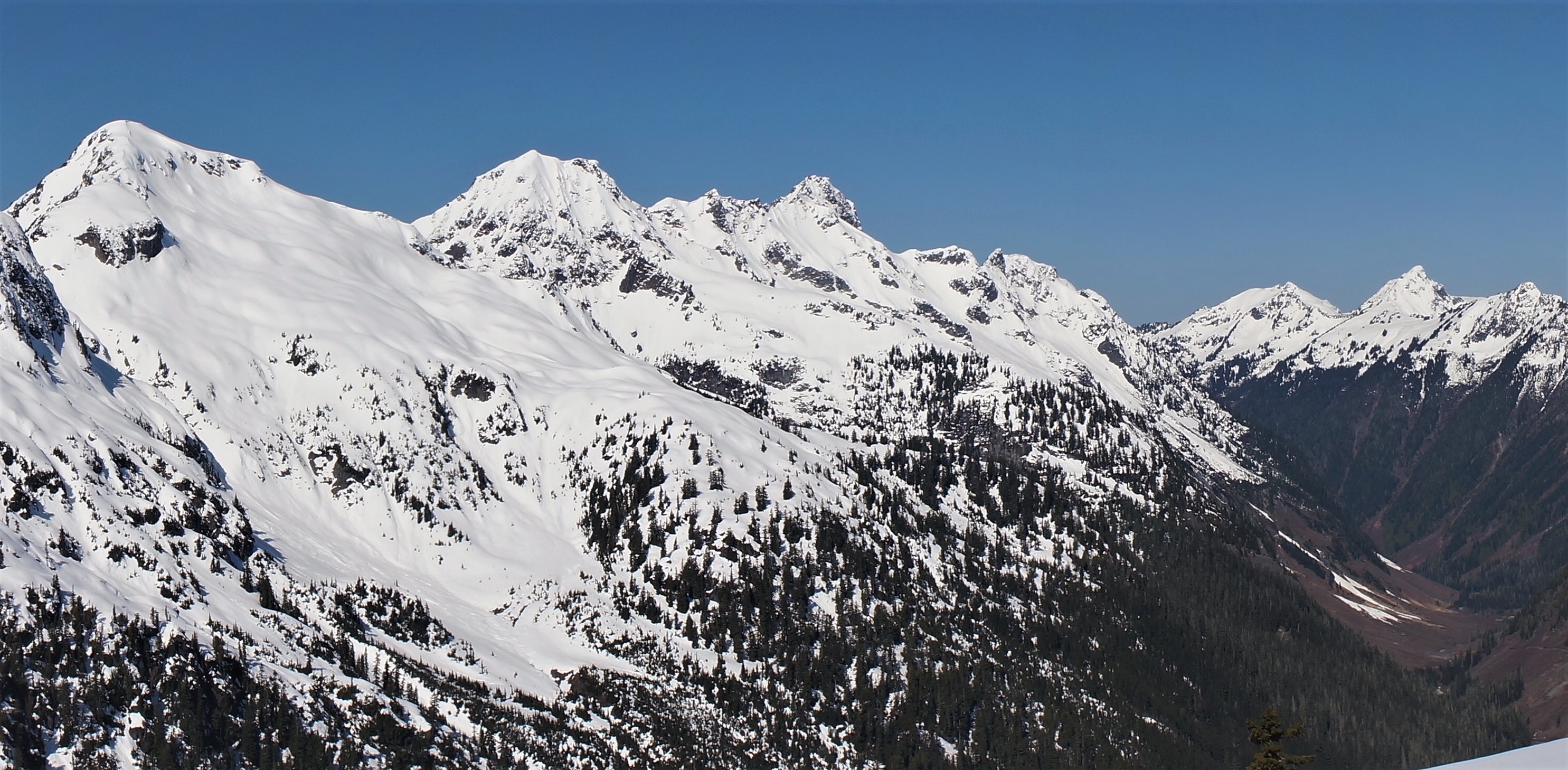
Mt. Sefrit from Hannegan Peak

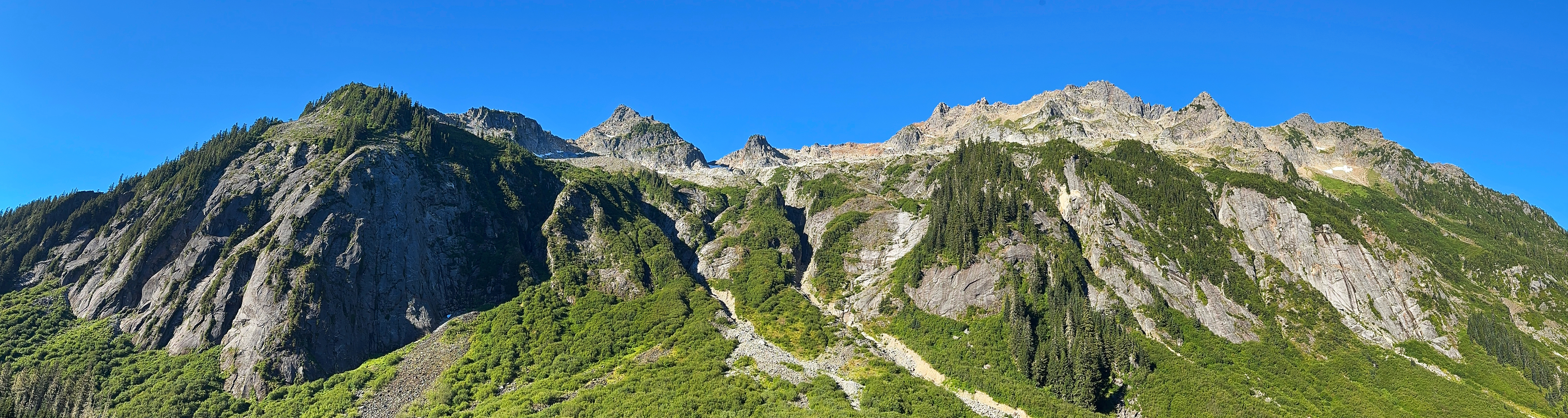
Mount Sefrit and Nooksack Ridge

Mt. Sefrit (left) and Mt. Shuksan (right)

== See also ==
- Geography of the North Cascades
