= List of places in Alaska (G) =

This list of cities, towns, unincorporated communities, counties, and other recognized places in the U.S. state of Alaska also includes information on the number and names of counties in which the place lies, and its lower and upper zip code bounds, if applicable.

Name of place	Number of counties	Principal county	Lower zip code	Upper zip code
Gakona	1	Valdez-Cordova Census Area	99586	
Gakona Junction	1	Valdez-Cordova Census Area		
Galena	1	Yukon-Koyukuk Census Area	99741	
Galena Airport	1	Yukon-Koyukuk Census Area	98741	
Galena City School District	1	Yukon-Koyukuk Census Area		
Gambell	1	Nome Census Area	99742	
Game Creek	1	Skagway-Hoonah-Angoon Census Area		
Ganes Creek	1	Yukon-Koyukuk Census Area	99675	
Garden Island	1	Fairbanks North Star Borough		
Garner	1	Denali Borough		
Gates of the Arctic National Park	3	North Slope Borough	99501	
Gates of the Arctic National Park	3	Northwest Arctic Borough	99501	
Gates of the Arctic National Park	3	Yukon-Koyukuk Census Area	99501	
Gateway	1	Matanuska-Susitna Borough		
Georgetown	1	Bethel Census Area		
Gildersleeve Float	1	Prince of Wales-Outer Census Area		
Gilpatricks	1	Kenai Peninsula Borough		
Girdwood	1	Municipality of Anchorage	99587	
Glacier	1	Municipality of Skagway Borough		
Glacier Bay National Park	2	Skagway-Hoonah-Angoon Census Area	99501	
Glacier Bay National Park	2	City and Borough of Yakutat	99501	
Glacier View	1	Matanuska-Susitna Borough		
Glen Alps	1	Municipality of Anchorage	99501	
Glennallen	1	Valdez-Cordova Census Area	99588	
Goddard	1	City and Borough of Sitka		
Gold Creek	1	Matanuska-Susitna Borough	99676	
Golden	1	Valdez-Cordova Census Area		
Golovin	1	Nome Census Area	99762	
Goodnews Bay	1	Bethel Census Area	99589	
Goodnews Mining Camp	1	Bethel Census Area	99651	
Gordon	1	North Slope Borough		
Gost Creek	1	Yukon-Koyukuk Census Area		
Graehl	1	Fairbanks North Star Borough	99701	
Grandview	1	Kenai Peninsula Borough		
Granite Mountain	1	Nome Census Area		
Grant Creek	1	Yukon-Koyukuk Census Area		
Grayling	1	Yukon-Koyukuk Census Area	99590	
Grouse Creek Group	1	Kenai Peninsula Borough		
Gulkana	1	Valdez-Cordova Census Area	99586	
Gustavus	1	Skagway-Hoonah-Angoon Census Area	99826	
