= Granite Range (Elko County) =

Mountain range in Nevada, United States

- Location within Nevada

Highest point
- Elevation: 2,388 m (7,835 ft)

Geography
- Country: United States
- State: Nevada
- District: Elko County
- Range coordinates: 41°43′26.691″N 114°40′23.125″W
- Topo map: USGS Blanchard Mountain

The Granite Range is a mountain range in Elko County, Nevada.
