= The Cradle (Washington) =

Mountain in Washington (state), United States

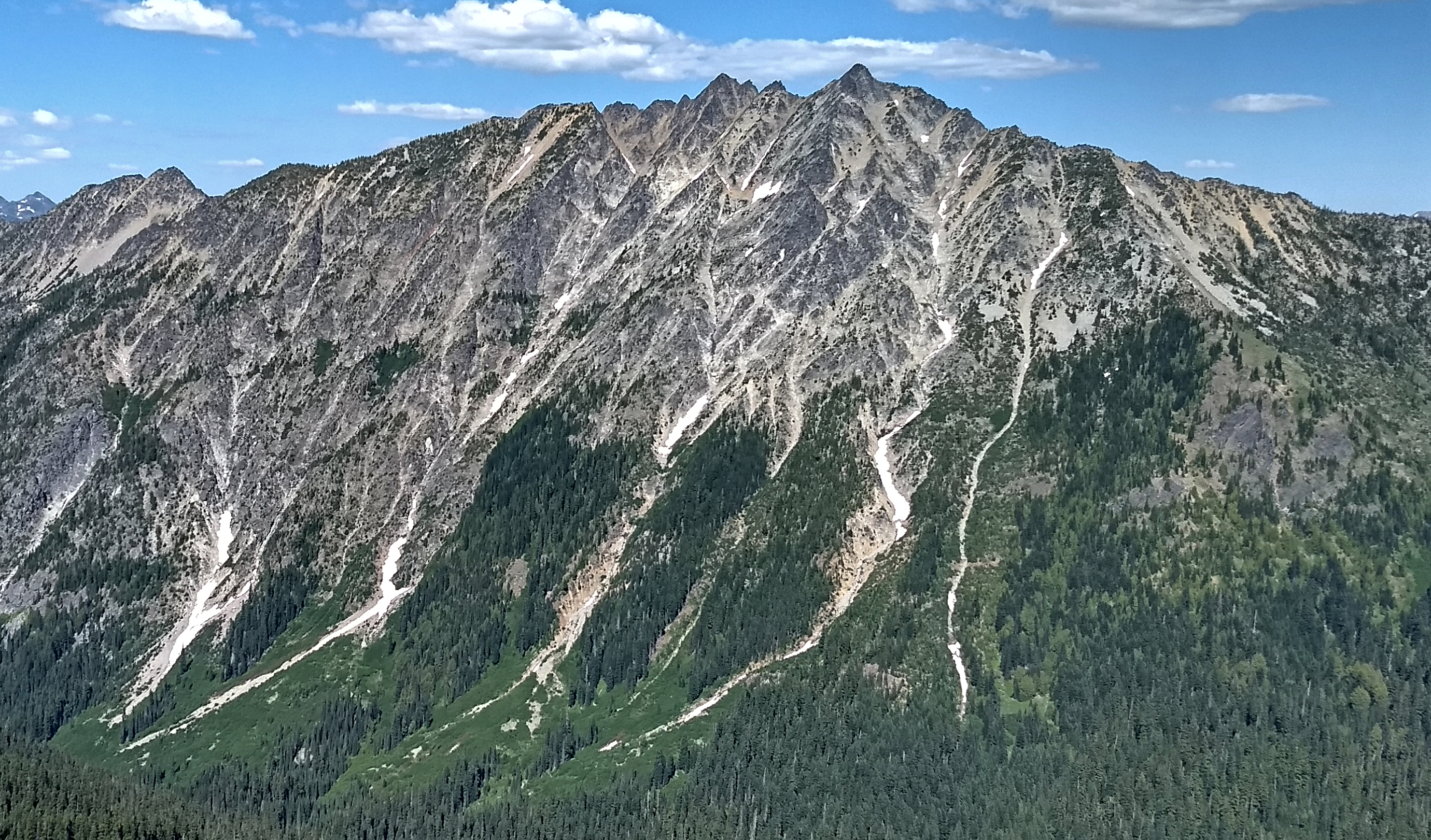
- The Cradle, southwest aspect

Highest point
- Elevation: 7,472 ft (2,277 m)
- Prominence: 2,144 ft (653 m)
- Parent peak: Ingalls Peak (7,662 ft)
- Isolation: 5.74 mi (9.24 km)
- Coordinates: 47°33′39″N 121°01′59″W

Geography
- Location within Washington (state) Location within the United States
- Country: United States
- State: Washington
- County: Chelan
- Protected area: Alpine Lakes Wilderness
- Parent range: Cascade Range; Wenatchee Mountains
- Topo map: USGS The Cradle

Geology
- Rock age: Cretaceous
- Rock type: Granite

Climbing
- First ascent: 1944
- Easiest route: Scrambling class 3 South ridge

The Cradle is a prominent 7,472-foot (2,277-metre) double summit mountain located in Chelan County of Washington state. The mountain's name is derived from the depression between the two peaks of nearly identical elevation. The Cradle is situated within the Alpine Lakes Wilderness and is part of the Wenatchee Mountains, which is subset of the Cascade Range. Its nearest higher peak is Jack Ridge, 5.7 mi (9.2 km) to the east-southeast. Precipitation runoff from the mountain drains into tributaries of Icicle Creek, which in turn is a tributary of the Wenatchee River. The first ascent of the south peak was made in 1944 by Gene Paxton and Dwight Watson, whereas the north peak wasn't climbed until 1952 by Bill and Gene Prater.

== Climate ==
Weather fronts originating in the Pacific Ocean travel east toward the Cascade Mountains. As fronts approach, they are forced upward by the peaks of the Cascade Range (orographic lift), causing them to drop their moisture in the form of rain or snow onto the Cascades. As a result, the Cascades experience high precipitation, especially during the winter months in the form of snowfall. During winter months, weather is usually cloudy, but due to high pressure systems over the Pacific Ocean that intensify during summer months, there is often little or no cloud cover during the summer.

== Geology ==
The Alpine Lakes Wilderness features some of the most rugged topography in the Cascade Range with craggy peaks and ridges, deep glacial valleys, and granite walls spotted with over 700 mountain lakes. Geological events occurring many years ago created the diverse topography and drastic elevation changes over the Cascade Range leading to the various climate differences.

The history of the formation of the Cascade Mountains dates back millions of years ago to the late Eocene Epoch. With the North American Plate overriding the Pacific Plate, episodes of volcanic igneous activity persisted. In addition, small fragments of the oceanic and continental lithosphere called terranes created the North Cascades about 50 million years ago.

During the Pleistocene period dating back over two million years ago, glaciation advancing and retreating repeatedly scoured the landscape leaving deposits of rock debris. The last glacial retreat in the Alpine Lakes area began about 14,000 years ago and was north of the Canada–US border by 10,000 years ago. The U-shaped cross section of the river valleys is a result of that recent glaciation. Uplift and faulting in combination with glaciation have been the dominant processes which have created the tall peaks and deep valleys of the Alpine Lakes Wilderness area.

== See also ==
- List of peaks of the Alpine Lakes Wilderness
- Geology of the Pacific Northwest

== Gallery ==
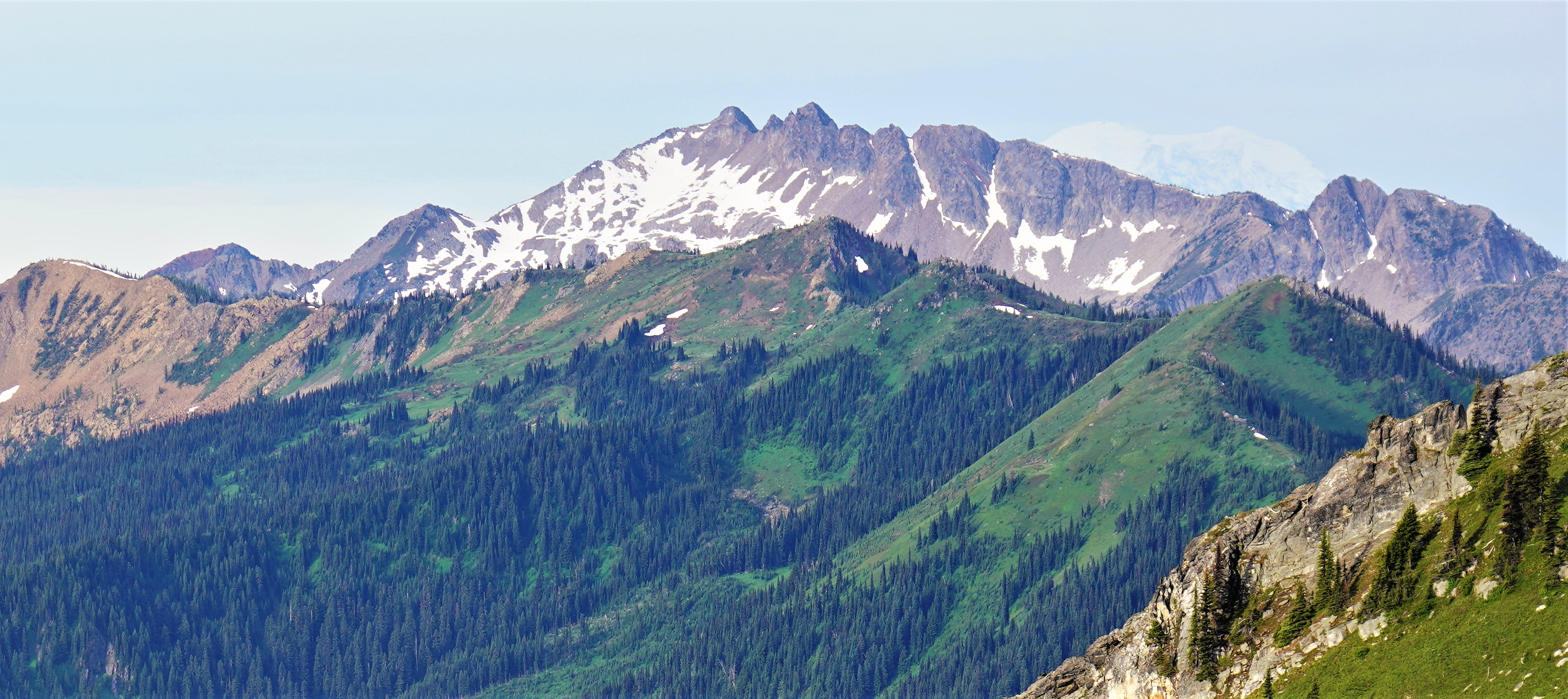
The Cradle behind Sixtysix Hundred Ridge, from northeast

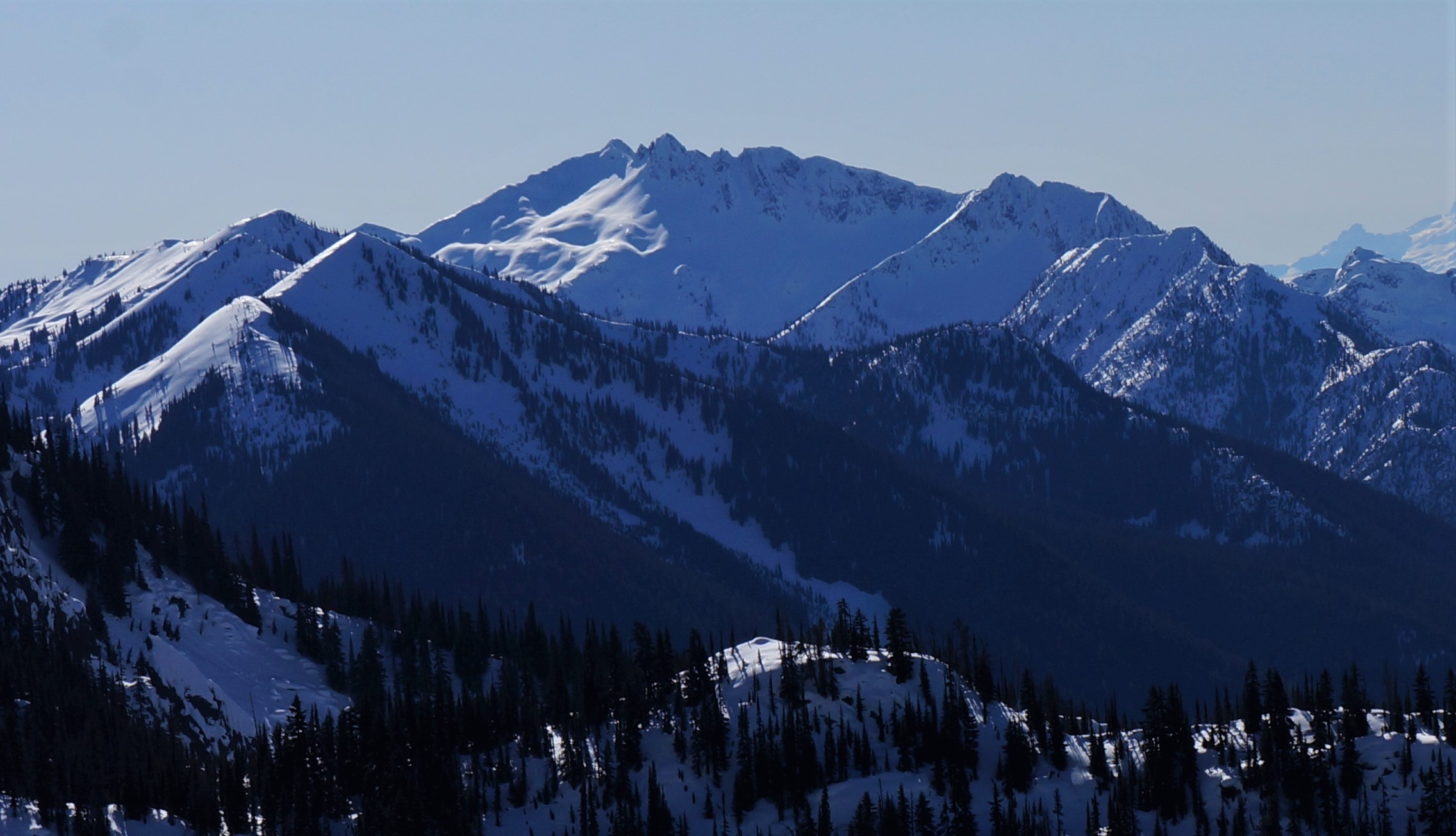
The Cradle in winter
