= Granite Mountain (King County, Washington) =

Mountain in Washington (state), United States

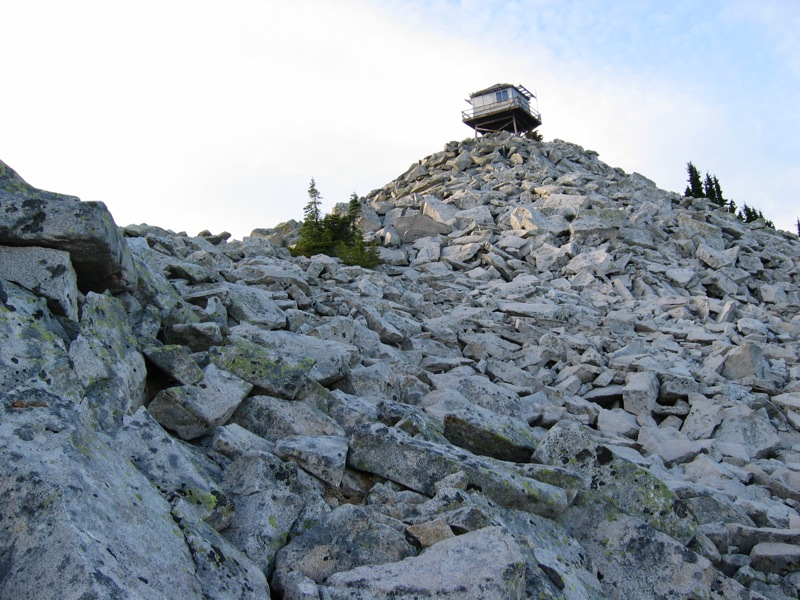

Highest point
- Elevation: 5,633 ft (1,717 m) NAVD 88
- Prominence: 1,149 ft (350 m)
- Coordinates: 47°25′04″N 121°28′53″W

Geography
- Location within Washington (state) Location within the United States
- Location: King County, Washington, U.S.
- Parent range: Cascade Range
- Topo map: USGS Snoqualmie Pass

Climbing
- Easiest route: Hiking Trail

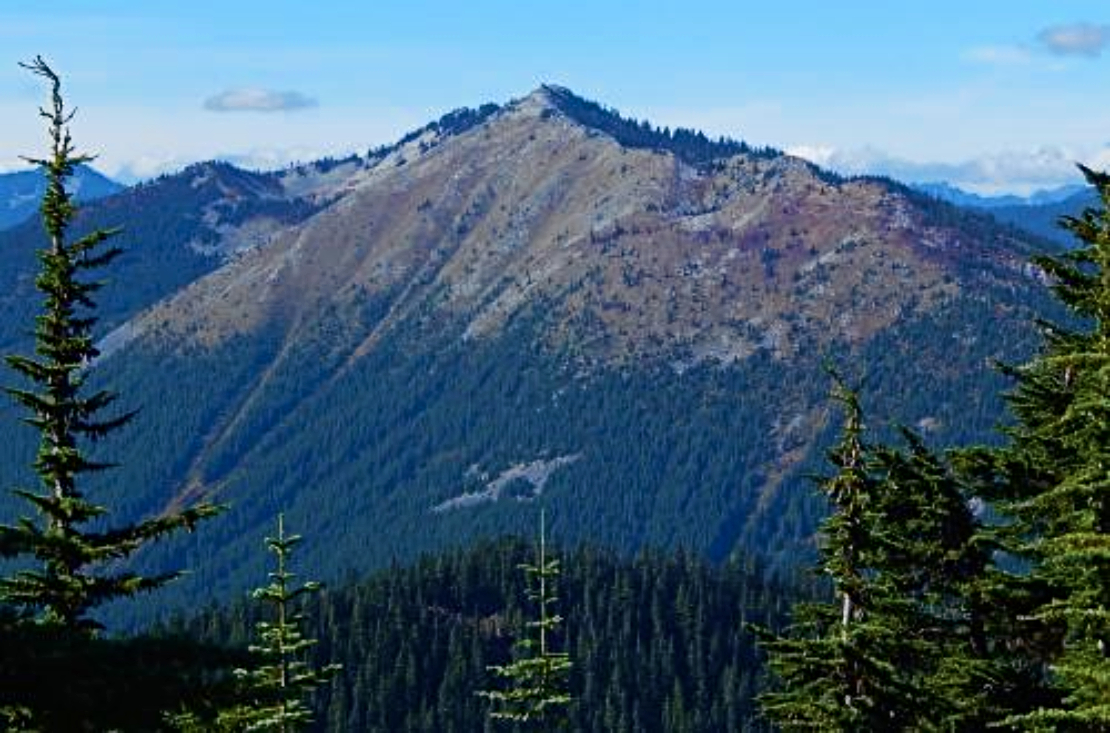
Granite Mountain seen from Mount Catherine

Granite Mountain is a tall peak in the Cascade Range in King County, Washington, United States, 16 miles (26 km) east of North Bend. A fire lookout on the summit can be reached by trail. The fire lookout was first constructed in 1924 and was then rebuilt 31 years later. It is still maintained by volunteers June through September each year.

== Climate ==
Granite Mountain is located in the marine west coast climate zone of western North America. Most weather fronts originate in the Pacific Ocean, and travel northeast toward the Cascade Mountains. As fronts approach, they are forced upward by the peaks of the Cascade Range, causing them to drop their moisture in the form of rain or snowfall onto the Cascades. As a result, the west side of the North Cascades experiences high precipitation, especially during the winter months in the form of snowfall. Due to its temperate climate and proximity to the Pacific Ocean, areas west of the Cascade Crest very rarely experience temperatures below 0 °F (−18 °C) or above 80 °F (27 °C). During winter months, weather is usually cloudy, but, due to high pressure systems over the Pacific Ocean that intensify during summer months, there is often little or no cloud cover during the summer. Because of maritime influence, snow tends to be wet and heavy, resulting in high avalanche danger.

== See also ==
- Granite Mountain (Wenatchee Mountains)
- Granite Mountain (Whatcom County, Washington)
- Granite Mountain (Washington), ten peaks
