= Granite Mountain (Whatcom County, Washington) =

Mountain in Washington (state), United States

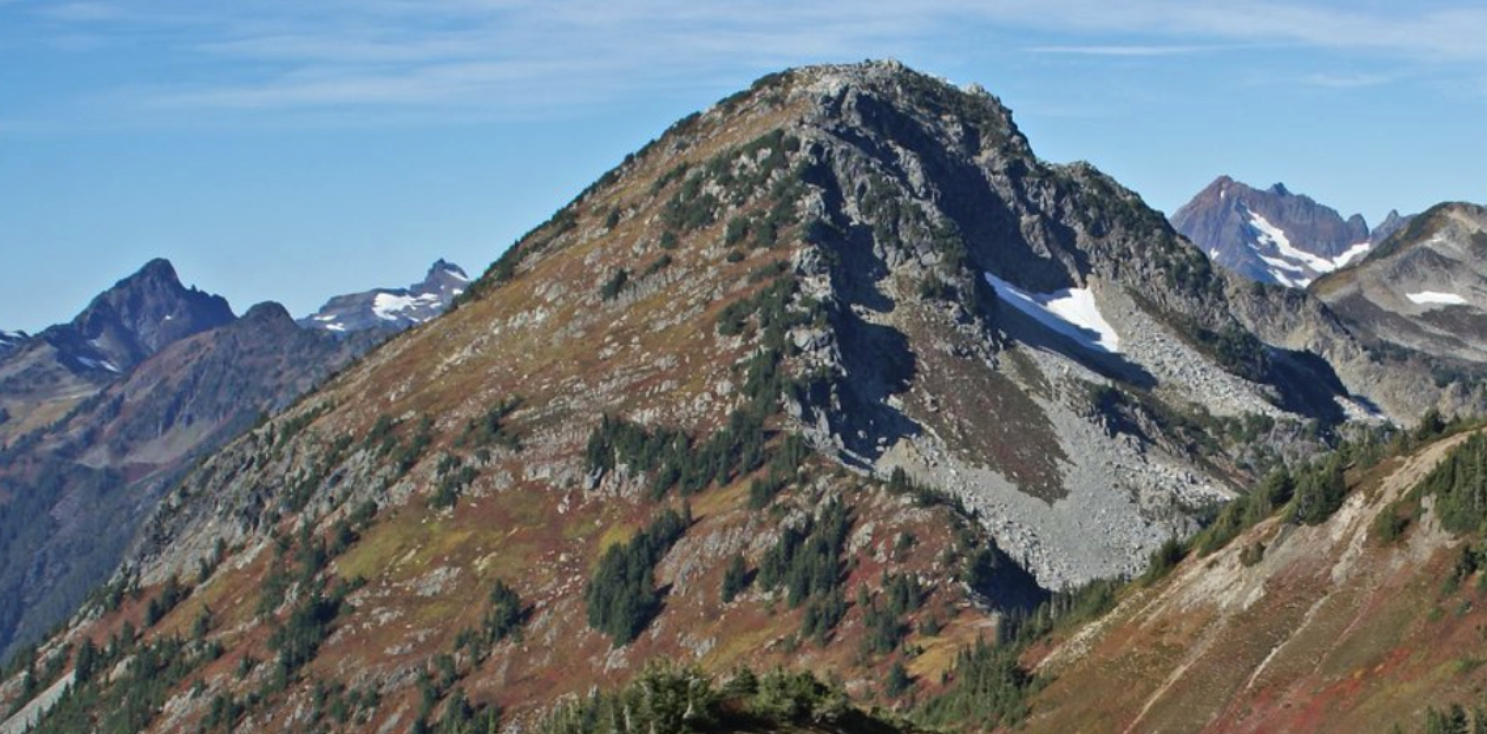
- Granite Mountain, southeast aspect

Highest point
- Elevation: 6,692 ft (2,040 m) NAVD 88
- Prominence: 648 ft (198 m)
- Parent peak: Mount Chardonnay
- Isolation: 1.69 mi (2.72 km)
- Coordinates: 48°54′16″N 121°33′14″W

Geography
- Location within Washington (state) Location within the United States
- Interactive map of Granite Mountain
- Country: United States
- State: Washington
- County: Whatcom
- Protected area: Mount Baker Wilderness
- Parent range: North Cascades
- Topo map: USGS Mount Sefrit

Climbing
- Easiest route: Scramble

Granite Mountain is a 6,692-foot (2,040-metre) mountain summit located in the Skagit Range, which is a subset of the North Cascades in Whatcom County of Washington state. It is situated 1.7 mi (2.7 km) south of Mount Chardonnay, and 1.2 mi (1.9 km) northwest of Hannegan Peak in the Mount Baker Wilderness, which is managed by the Mount Baker-Snoqualmie National Forest. Precipitation runoff from the mountain drains into tributaries of the Fraser River and the Nooksack River.

== Climate ==
Granite Mountain is located in the marine west coast climate zone of western North America. Weather fronts originating in the Pacific Ocean travel northeast toward the Cascade Mountains. As fronts approach the North Cascades, they are forced upward by the peaks of the Cascade Range (orographic lift), causing them to drop their moisture in the form of rain or snowfall onto the Cascades. As a result, the west side of the North Cascades experiences high precipitation, especially during the winter months in the form of snowfall. Because of maritime influence, snow tends to be wet and heavy, resulting in high avalanche danger. During winter months, the weather is usually cloudy, but, due to high pressure systems over the Pacific Ocean that intensify during summer months, there is often little or no cloud cover during the summer. Due to its temperate climate and proximity to the Pacific Ocean, areas west of the Cascade Crest very rarely experience temperatures below 0 °F (−18 °C) or above 80 °F (27 °C).

== Geology ==
The North Cascades features some of the most rugged topography in the Cascade Range with craggy peaks, ridges, and deep glacial valleys. Geological events occurring many years ago created the diverse topography and drastic elevation changes over the Cascade Range leading to the various climate differences.

The history of the formation of the Cascade Mountains dates back millions of years ago to the late Eocene Epoch. With the North American Plate overriding the Pacific Plate, episodes of volcanic igneous activity persisted. In addition, small fragments of the oceanic and continental lithosphere called terranes created the North Cascades about 50 million years ago.

During the Pleistocene period dating back over two million years ago, glaciation advancing and retreating repeatedly scoured the landscape leaving deposits of rock debris. The U-shaped cross section of the river valleys is a result of recent glaciation. Uplift and faulting in combination with glaciation have been the dominant processes which have created the tall peaks and deep valleys of the North Cascades area.

== See also ==
- Geography of Washington (state)
- Geology of the Pacific Northwest
- Geography of the North Cascades
- Granite Mountain (King County, Washington)
- Granite Mountain (Wenatchee Mountains)
- Granite Mountain (Washington), ten peaks
