= Mac Peak =

Mountain in Washington (state), United States

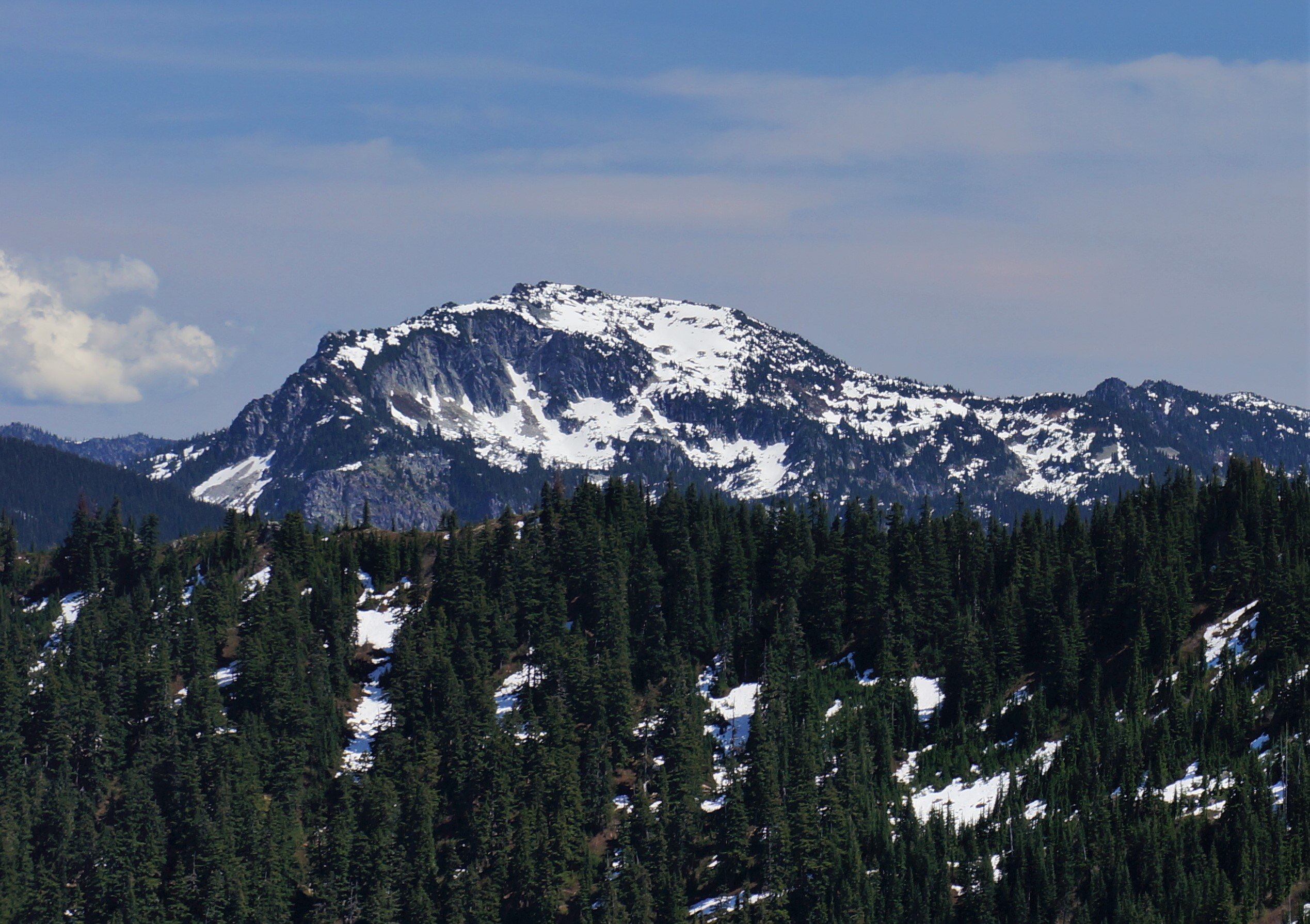
- Northwest aspect from Mt. Sawyer

Highest point
- Elevation: 6,859 ft (2,091 m)
- Prominence: 779 ft (237 m)
- Parent peak: Granite Mountain (7,144 ft)
- Isolation: 3.6 mi (5.8 km)
- Coordinates: 47°37′39″N 121°07′30″W

Geography
- Location within Washington (state) Location within the United States
- Country: United States
- State: Washington
- County: King / Chelan
- Protected area: Alpine Lakes Wilderness
- Parent range: Wenatchee Mountains; Cascade Range
- Topo map: USGS Stevens Pass

Geology
- Rock age: Late Cretaceous
- Rock type: Tonalitic plutons

Climbing
- Easiest route: scrambling

Mac Peak is a 6,859-foot (2,091-metre) mountain summit located eight miles (13 km) south of Stevens Pass on the common border of King County and Chelan County in Washington state. It's part of the Wenatchee Mountains, which are a subset of the Cascade Range, and is situated in the Alpine Lakes Wilderness. Precipitation runoff from the mountain drains west into Deception Creek, or east into tributaries of Icicle Creek. The nearest higher neighbor is Granite Mountain, 3.6 mi (5.8 km) to the south-southeast, and Surprise Mountain is set 1.6 mi (2.6 km) to the northwest. The Pacific Crest Trail skirts below the west side this peak.

== Climate ==
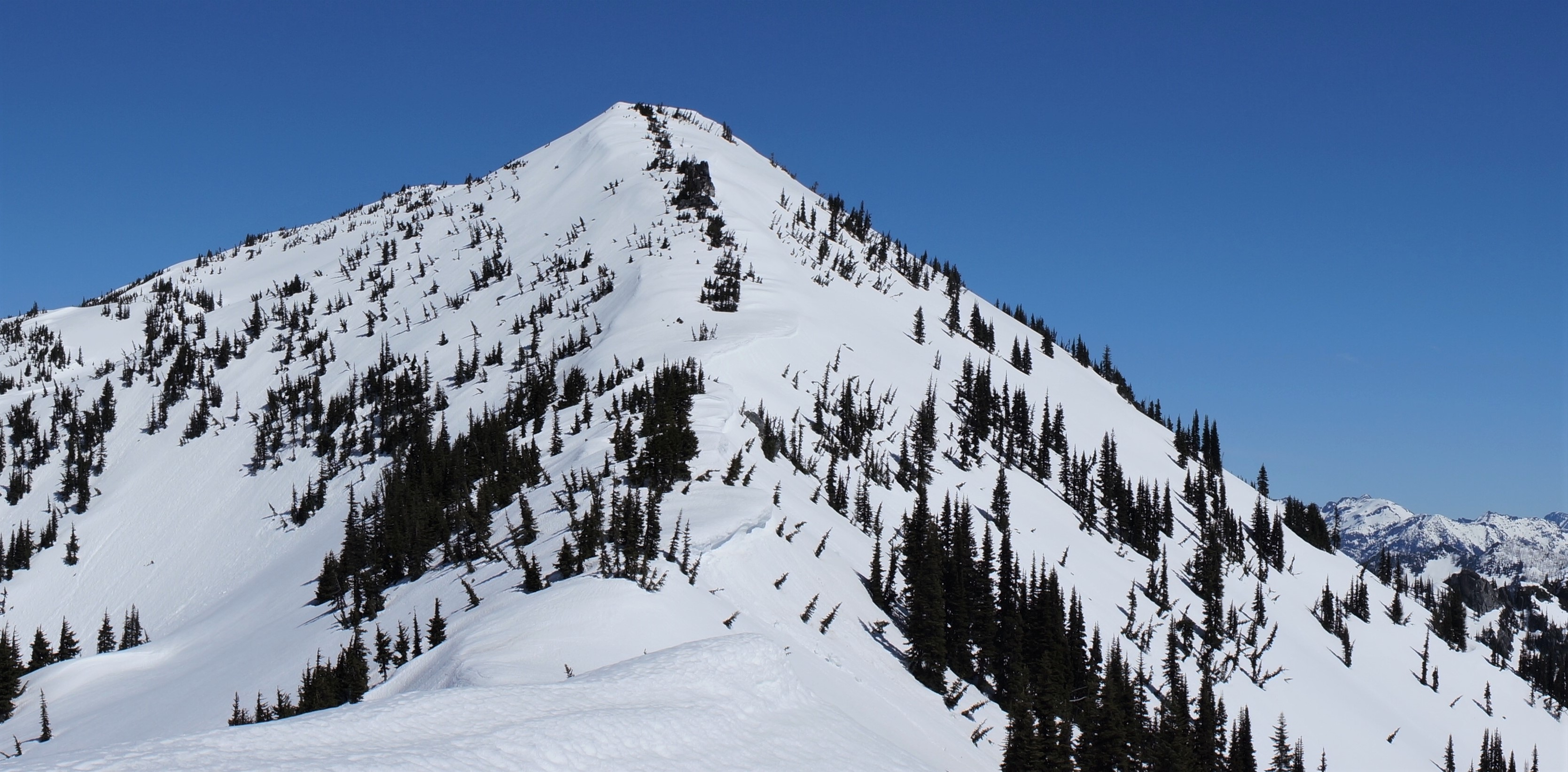
Southwest Ridge

Mac Peak is located in the marine west coast climate zone of western North America. Weather fronts coming off the Pacific Ocean travel northeast toward the Cascade Mountains. As fronts approach, they are forced upward by the peaks of the Cascade Range, causing them to drop their moisture in the form of rain or snow onto the Cascades (Orographic lift). As a result, the west side of the Cascades experiences high precipitation, especially during the winter months in the form of snowfall. Because of maritime influence, snow tends to be wet and heavy, resulting in avalanche danger. During winter months, weather is usually cloudy, but, due to high pressure systems over the Pacific Ocean that intensify during summer months, there is often little or no cloud cover during the summer. The months July through September offer the most favorable weather for viewing or climbing this peak.

== Geology ==
The Alpine Lakes Wilderness features some of the most rugged topography in the Cascade Range with craggy peaks and ridges, deep glacial valleys, and granite walls spotted with over 700 mountain lakes. Geological events occurring many years ago created the diverse topography and drastic elevation changes over the Cascade Range leading to the various climate differences.

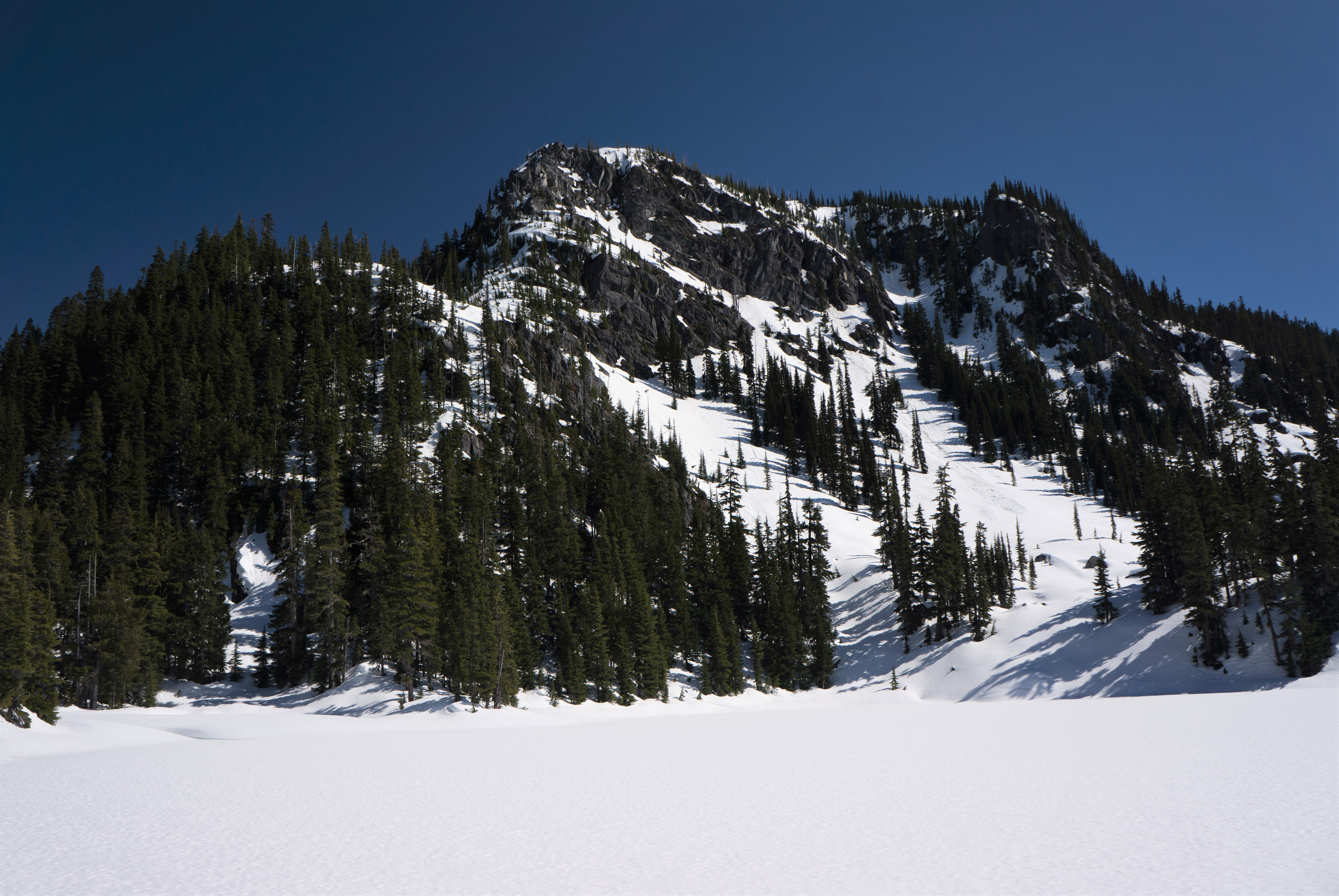
Mac Peak from Deception Lakes

The history of the formation of the Cascade Mountains dates back millions of years ago to the late Eocene Epoch. With the North American Plate overriding the Pacific Plate, episodes of volcanic igneous activity persisted. In addition, small fragments of the oceanic and continental lithosphere called terranes created the North Cascades about 50 million years ago.

During the Pleistocene period dating back over two million years ago, glaciation advancing and retreating repeatedly scoured and shaped the landscape. The last glacial retreat in the Alpine Lakes area began about 14,000 years ago and was north of the Canada–US border by 10,000 years ago. The U-shaped cross section of the river valleys is a result of that recent glaciation. Uplift and faulting in combination with glaciation have been the dominant processes which have created the tall peaks and deep valleys of the Alpine Lakes Wilderness area.

== See also ==
- List of peaks of the Alpine Lakes Wilderness
