= Skagit Range =

- Nexwx̠ex̠tsán (Nooksack)
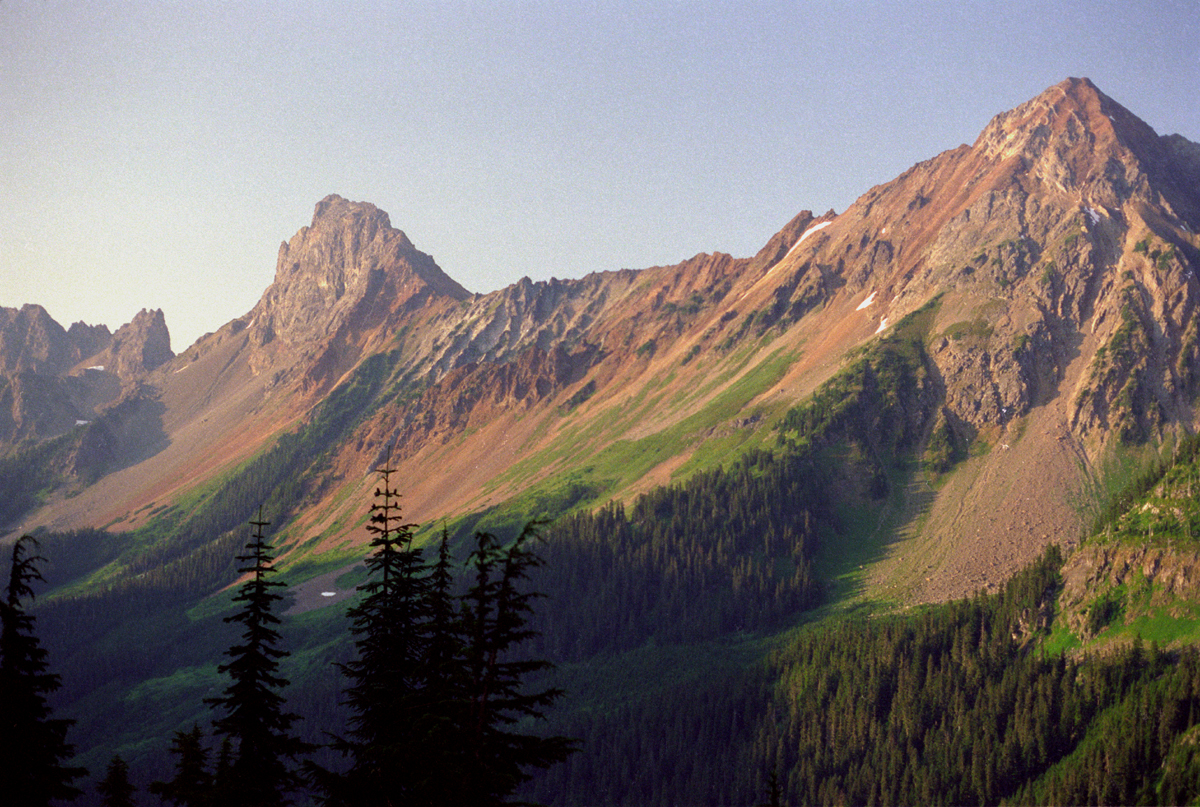
- American Border Peak from Gold Run Pass

Dimensions
- Area: 1,718 km^{2} (663 mi^{2})

Geography
- Countries: Canada and United States
- Provinces/States: British Columbia and Washington
- Range coordinates: 49°10′N 121°30′W
- Parent range: Canadian Cascades

The Skagit Range (/ˈskædʒɪt/ SKAJ-it, Nooksack: Nexwx̠ex̠tsán) is a subrange of the Cascade Range in southwestern British Columbia, Canada and northwestern Washington, United States, which are known in Canada as the Canadian Cascades or, officially, the Cascade Mountains. It is also known in the Nooksack language as Nexwx̠ex̠tsán. The Skagit Range lies to the west of the Skagit River and east and north of the Chilliwack River and flanks the Upper Fraser Valley region of British Columbia's Lower Mainland.

Of the three subranges of the Canadian Cascades—the Skagit, Hozameen, and Okanagan ranges—the Skagit is the most mountainous. It continues north to the Fraser River, sometimes using different local names. The Hope Mountains, and the "Anderson River Group" are separated from the main Skagit Range by distinct natural boundaries, but are otherwise similar in character.

== Geography ==
According to Fred Beckey there are differences of opinion about the names and locations of the subranges of the northern Cascades, especially between Canadian and American geographers. Nevertheless, early geologists and topographers had a fundamental agreement about the location and names of the subranges. The Skagit Range was seen as the mountainous area from the Skagit River northwest to the Fraser River. More recent Canadian maps show the Skagit Range as bounded to the west by the Sumallo-Nicolum valley and extending north along the east side of the Coquihalla River.

BCGNIS defines the Skagit Range simply as "west of the Skagit River, extends into the U.S.A." The USGS defines the range in its GNIS database with a single point, 48°55′39″N 121°33′57″W, north of Granite Mountain where Mount Chardonnay is situated. Peakbagger.com defines the Skagit Range as a large and not entirely mountainous region bounded by the Fraser River to the north, the Skagit River to the south and east, the Strait of Georgia to the west, and the Nicolum River and Sumallo River on the northeast. This definition includes a sizable area of non-mountainous areas, especially along the lower Fraser River and near the coast.

Subranges include the Cheam Range, also known as the Four Brothers, and the Picket Range.

== Peaks/Summits ==
Notable summits include Hope Mountain, Mount Barr, Cheam Peak, Slesse Mountain, Mount Rexford, Mount Larrabee, and the American-Canadian Border Peaks.

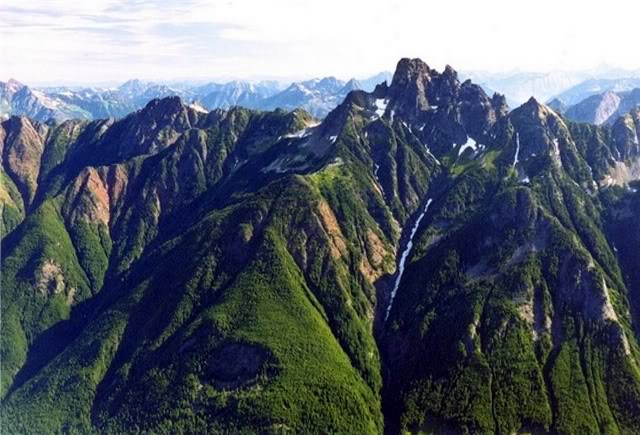
Slesse seen from Mount Larrabee

== See also ==
- Mount Baker
- List of mountain ranges
- List of mountain ranges in Washington
