= Granite Mountains =

Granite Mountains may refer to one of at least eight mountain ranges in the United States:

- Granite Mountains (Alaska)
- Granite Mountains (Arizona)
- Granite Mountains (California)
  - Granite Mountains (eastern San Bernardino County, California)
  - Granite Mountains (northern San Bernardino County, California)
  - Granite Mountains (western San Bernardino County, California)
  - Granite Mountains (Riverside County, California)
- Granite Mountains (Wyoming)

== See also ==
- Granite Mountain (disambiguation)
