= Granite Mountain (Washington) =

Mountains in the State of Washington, US

According to the USGS GNIS, the state of Washington in the United States has 10 peaks named Granite Mountain:

Name	USGS link	State	County	USGS map	Coordinates	Elevation	
Granite Mountain		Washington	Chelan	The Cradle	47°34′51″N 121°05′24″W	7,064 ft	2,153 m
Granite Mountain		Washington	Ferry	Edds Mountain	48°31′17″N 118°34′30″W	5,800 ft	1,800 m
Granite Mountain		Washington	Ferry	Karamin	48°49′36″N 118°40′57″W	4,094 ft	1,248 m
Granite Mountain		Washington	King	Snoqualmie Pass	47°58′11″N 118°04′06″W	5,610 ft	1,710 m
Granite Mountain		Washington	Okanogan	Moses Meadows	48°27′54″N 119°03′45″W	4,610 ft	1,410 m
Granite Mountain		Washington	Okanogan	Loup Loup Summit	48°29′47″N 119°53′48″W	7,333 ft	2,235 m
Little Granite Mountain		Washington	Okanogan	Conconully West	48°31′16″N 119°52′07″W	5,295 ft	1,614 m
Granite Mountain		Washington	Pend Oreille	Boyer Mountain	48°10′18″N 117°25′08″W	4,134 ft	1,260 m
Granite Mountain		Washington	Stevens	Kentry Ridge	48°27′07″N 118°03′32″W	4,216 ft	1,285 m
Granite Mountain		Washington	Whatcom	Mount Sefrit	48°54′18″N 121°33′12″W	6,578 ft	2,005 m
