= Yellow Aster Butte =

Mountain in Washington, United States of America

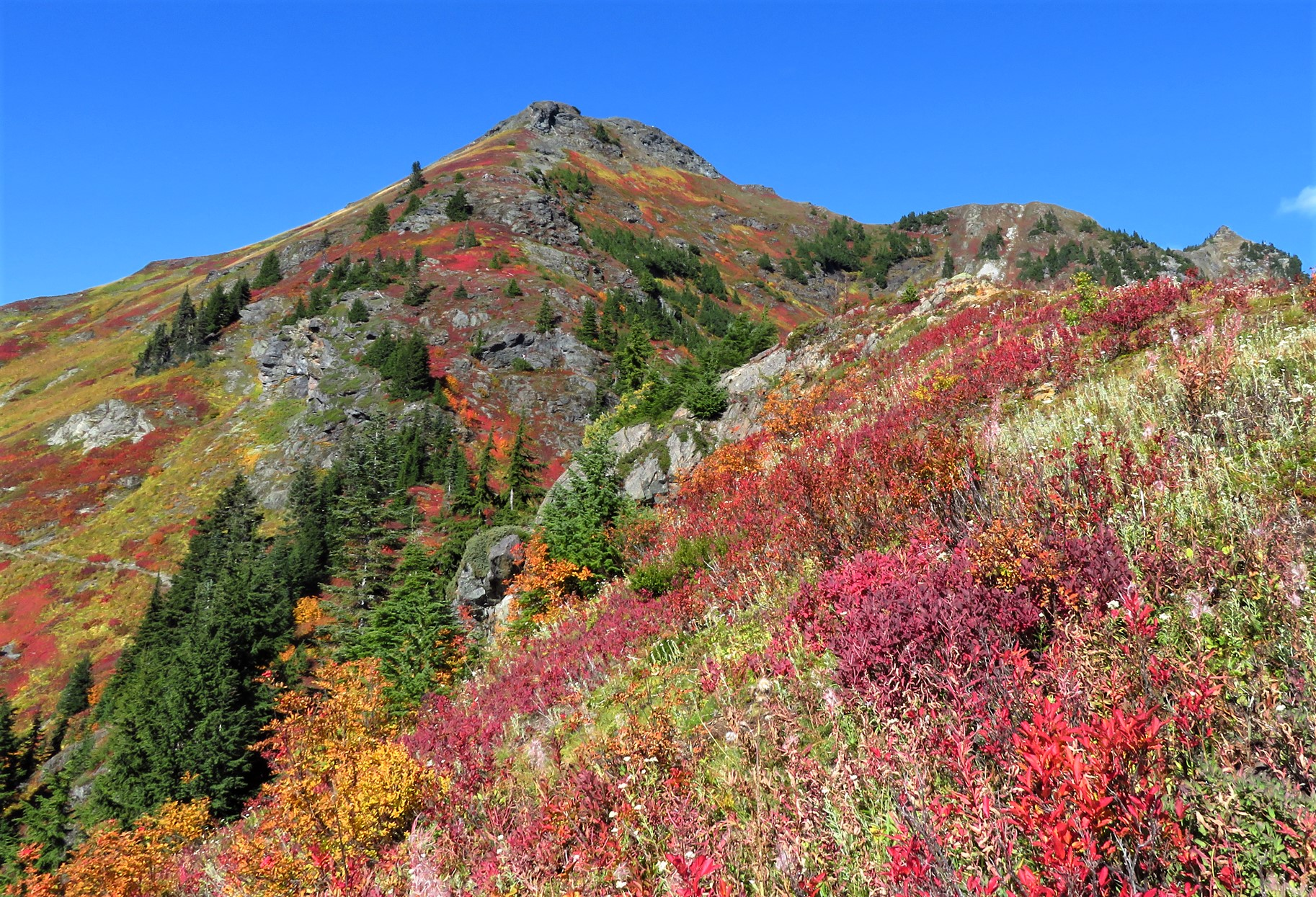
- Yellow Aster Butte

Highest point
- Elevation: 6,241 ft (1,902 m)
- Prominence: 681 ft (208 m)
- Parent peak: Tomyhoi Peak
- Isolation: 1.77 mi (2.85 km)
- Coordinates: 48°57′16″N 121°40′55″W

Geography
- Location within Washington (state) Location within the United States
- Interactive map of Yellow Aster Butte
- Country: United States
- State: Washington
- County: Whatcom
- Protected area: Mount Baker Wilderness
- Parent range: North Cascades; Cascade Range
- Topo map: USGS Mount Larrabee

Climbing
- Easiest route: Hiking trail

Yellow Aster Butte is a 6,241-foot (1,902-metre) Skagit Range summit located three miles south of the Canada–United States border, in Whatcom County of Washington state. It is situated within the Mount Baker Wilderness, on land managed by Mount Baker-Snoqualmie National Forest. The nearest higher neighbor is Winchester Mountain, 1.77 miles (2.85 km) to the east, and Mount Larrabee is set 2.3 miles (3.7 km) to the northeast. The summit offers views of Mount Larrabee, Tomyhoi Peak, American Border Peak, Canadian Border Peak, Mount Shuksan, and Mount Baker. Precipitation runoff on the north side of the mountain drains into Tomyhoi Creek, whereas the west side of the mountain drains into Damfino Creek, and the south slope is drained by Swamp Creek.

== Access ==
The Tomyhoi Lake Trail (#686) is accessed by the Twin Lakes Road (Forest Service #3065 in the North Fork Nooksack area) off of the Mount Baker Highway. The junction with the Yellow Aster Butte Trail (#686.1) is about 1.5 mile from the road.

== Climate ==
Yellow Aster Butte is located in the marine west coast climate zone of western North America. Weather fronts originating in the Pacific Ocean travel northeast toward the Cascade Mountains. As fronts approach the North Cascades, they are forced upward by the peaks of the Cascade Range (orographic lift), causing them to drop their moisture in the form of rain or snowfall onto the Cascades. As a result, the west side of the North Cascades experiences high precipitation, especially during the winter months in the form of snowfall. Because of maritime influence, snow tends to be wet and heavy, resulting in high avalanche danger. During winter months, weather is usually cloudy, but, due to high pressure systems over the Pacific Ocean that intensify during summer months, there is often little or no cloud cover during the summer. Due to its temperate climate and proximity to the Pacific Ocean, areas west of the Cascade Crest very rarely experience temperatures below 0 °F (−18 °C) or above 80 °F (27 °C). The months July through September offer the most favorable weather for viewing or climbing this peak.

== Geology ==
The North Cascades features some of the most rugged topography in the Cascade Range with craggy peaks, ridges, and deep glacial valleys. Geological events occurring many years ago created the diverse topography and drastic elevation changes over the Cascade Range leading to various climate differences.

The history of the formation of the Cascade Mountains dates back millions of years ago to the late Eocene Epoch. With the North American Plate overriding the Pacific Plate, episodes of volcanic igneous activity persisted. In addition, small fragments of the oceanic and continental lithosphere called terranes created the North Cascades about 50 million years ago.

During the Pleistocene period dating back over two million years ago, glaciation advancing and retreating repeatedly scoured and shaped the landscape. The U-shaped cross section of the river valleys is a result of recent glaciation. Uplift and faulting in combination with glaciation have been the dominant processes which have created the tall peaks and deep valleys of the North Cascades area.

== Gallery ==
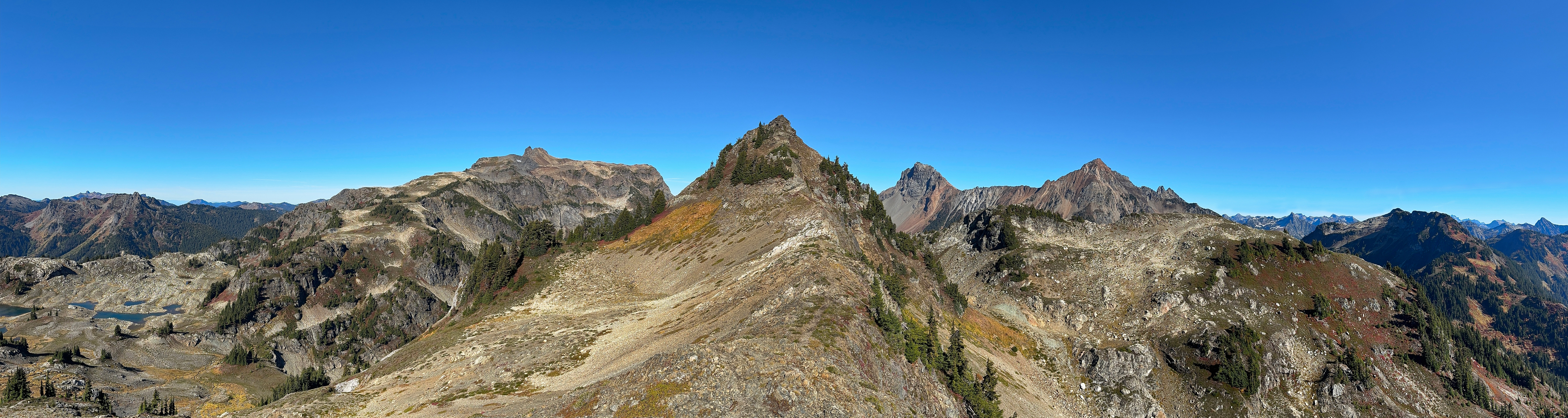
Yellow Aster Butte centered, with Tomyhoi Peak, American Border Peak, and Mount Larrabee in the background

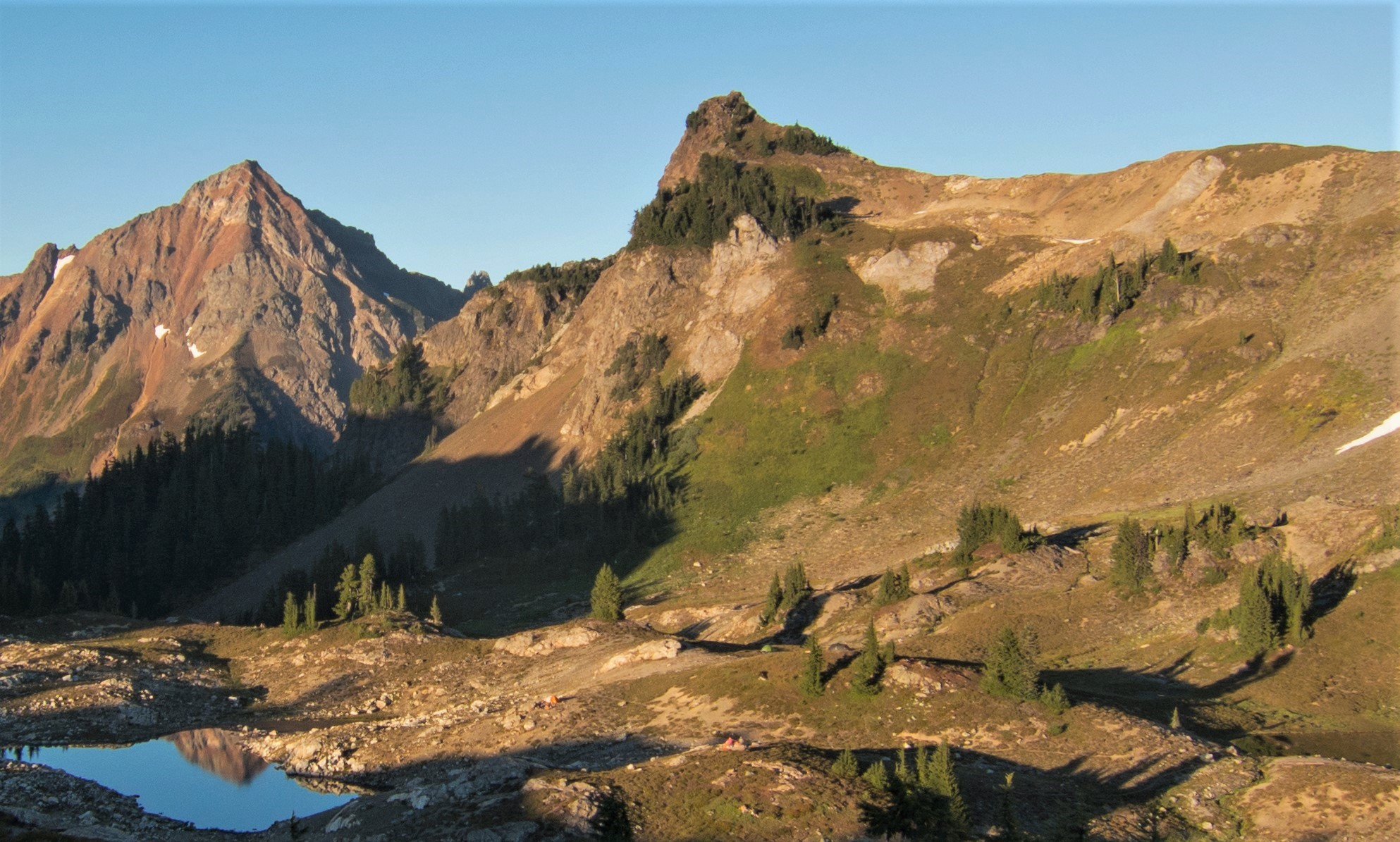
West aspect centered. Mount Larrabee to left

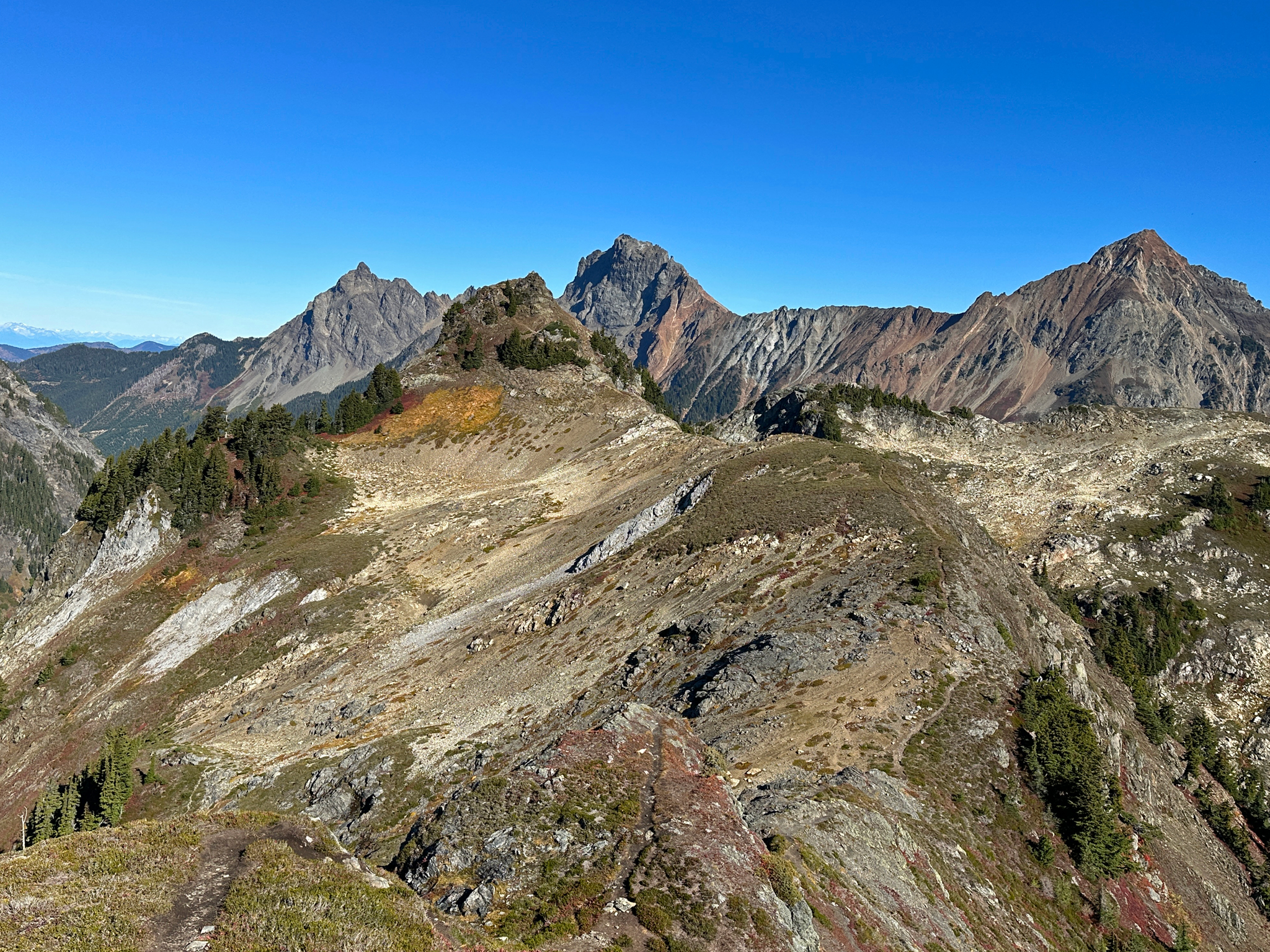
Yellow Aster Butte left of center, with Canadian Border Peak, American Border Peak, and Mount Larrabee in the background

== See also ==
- Geography of the North Cascades
- Geology of the Pacific Northwest
- List of mountain peaks of Washington (state)
