= Winchester Mountain Lookout =

Mountain in Washington (state), United States

- U.S. National Register of Historic Places
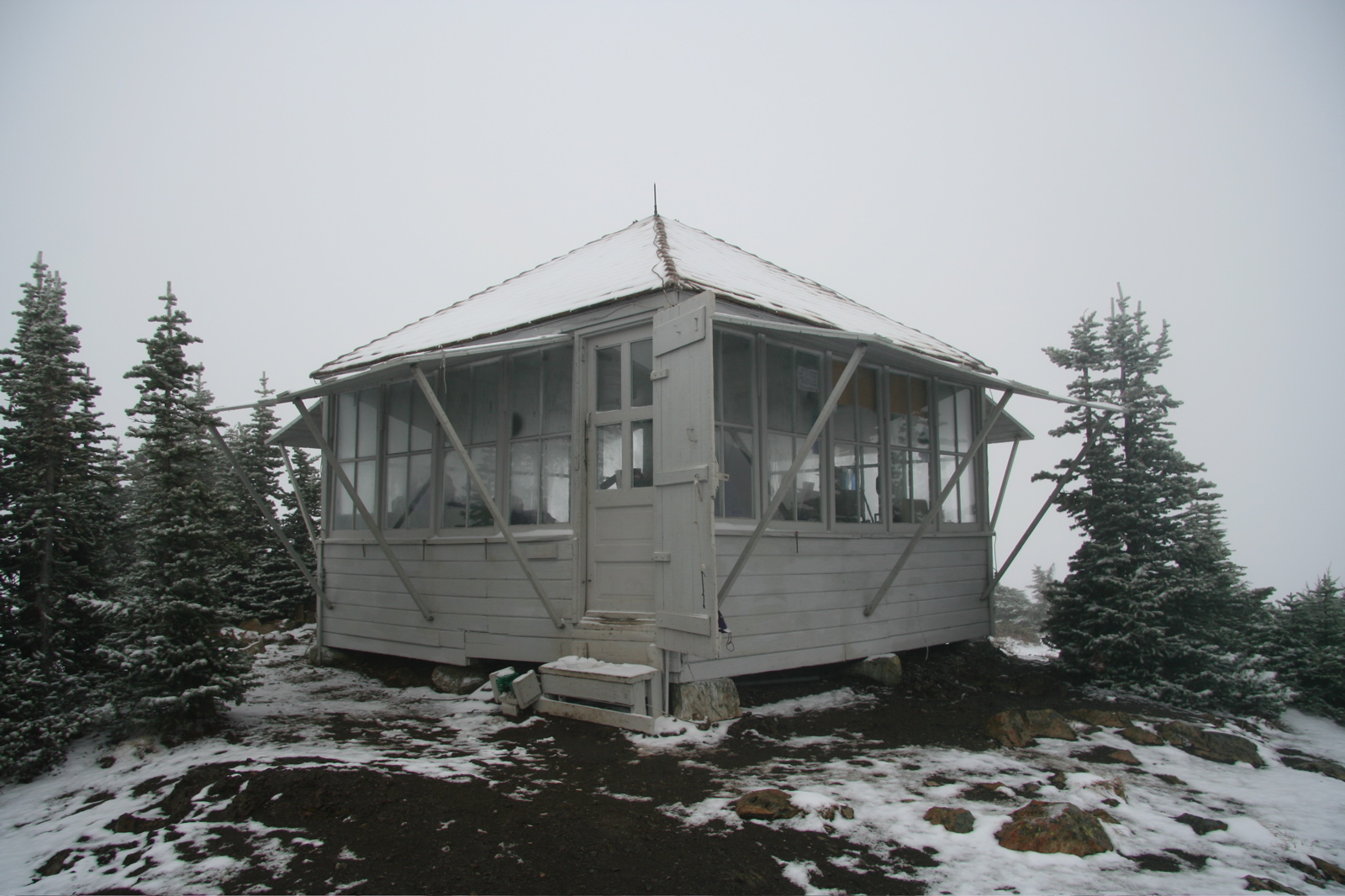
- Winchester Lookout (from the southwest)

- Location within Washington (state)
- Location: Mt Baker Ranger District, Whatcom County, Washington
- Coordinates: 48°57′24″N 121°38′35″W
- Built: 1935
- MPS: USDA Forest Service Fire Lookouts on Mt. Baker--Snoqualmie National Forest TR
- NRHP reference No.: 87001188
- Added to NRHP: July 14, 1987

The historical Winchester Lookout, located in the North Cascades in the U.S. state of Washington, provides views of the Northern Picket Range, Mount Baker, Mount Shuksan, Mount Larrabee, and Canadian peaks. The steep snowfields usually require an ice-axe well into July. The Twin Lakes road may not be passable to the trailhead which will add 2 miles (3.2 km) to the hike. Volunteers from the Mount Baker Club maintain the lookout with 2 work parties per year.

The lookout is open to the public for day or overnight use on a first-come first-served basis. Fires are not permitted at all.

== History ==
Winchester Mountain was named in the early 1900s by prospector Jack Post for the rifle he was carrying. This L-4 cab fire lookout was built in 1935 and staffed until 1966. The lookout was slated for demolition when in 1982 the Mount Baker Club, led by Gary Haufle, worked out a deal with the Forest Service to restore the lookout. The Forest Service provided the materials and the club provided all of the labor.

=== National Register ===
The lookout was added to the National Register of Historic Places on July 14, 1987, and is also on the National Historic Lookout Register.

Winchester Mountain Lookout (added 1987 - Structure - #87001188)

Mt. Baker Wilderness Area overlooking the north fork of Nooksack River and west fork of Silesia Creek, Sedro Woolley
Historic Significance: Event, Architecture/Engineering
Area of Significance: Architecture, Conservation, Politics/Government
Period of Significance: 1925-1949
Owner: Federal
Historic Function: Government
Historic Sub-function: Fire Station
Current Function: Government
Current Sub-function: Fire Station
Mt. Baker-Snoqualmie National Forest 15 miles (24 km) northeast of Mt. Baker Whatcom County, Washington Elevation 6,521 feet (1,988 m)

== Visiting ==
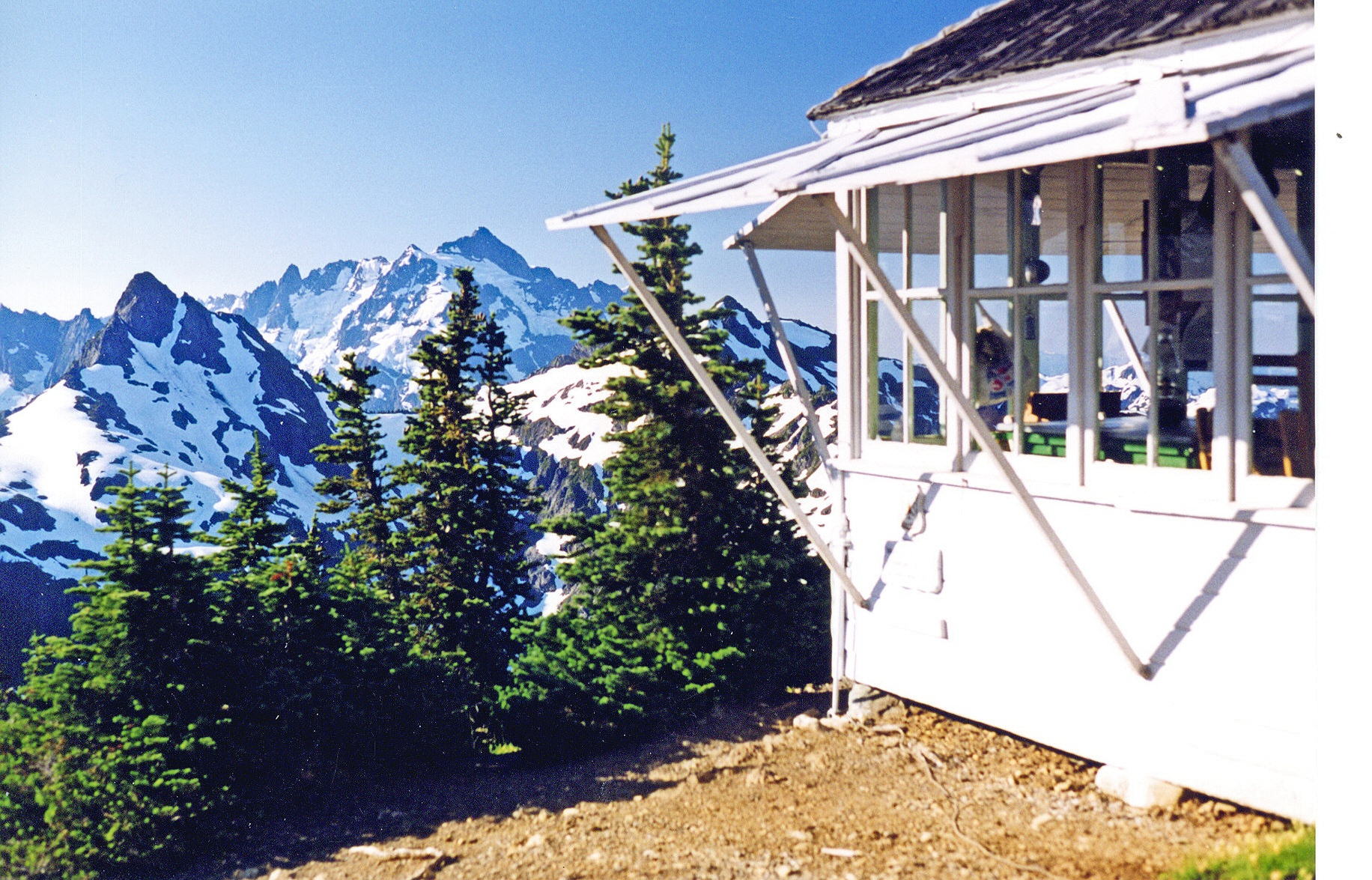
Winchester Mountain in 1999 with view of Goat Mountain and Mount Shuksan

The lookout is generally inaccessible from early October until mid summer due to snow. If you plan to spend the night in the lookout be aware that it may be occupied when you arrive. There are areas outside the lookout to pitch a tent, or sleep under the stars with no tent. There are 2 bunks in the lookout for overnighters. All visitors should arrive prepared with the essentials. As this is a Wilderness area there are no toilet facilities at the lookout, it is strictly "Pack in, Pack out". A snowfield that lasts late into the summer is behind the lookout and provides a water source. Boil all water.

=== The Trail ===
The trailhead for trail #685 to the top of Winchester Mountain is located between the two Twin Lakes. The steep trail, with a 1,300-foot (400 m) elevation gain, starts in a tall treed forest with fantastic wildflower filled clearings and climbs high into the rough windswept and a alpine. There are two very narrow sections of trail with long drops that require sure footing are not for the faint of heart. The trail is 2.1 miles (3.4 km) one-way and rated "more difficult" by the U.S. Forest Service.

The lookout is located within the Mount Baker Wilderness area. Wilderness area regulations restrict group size to no more than 12 persons.

=== The Road ===
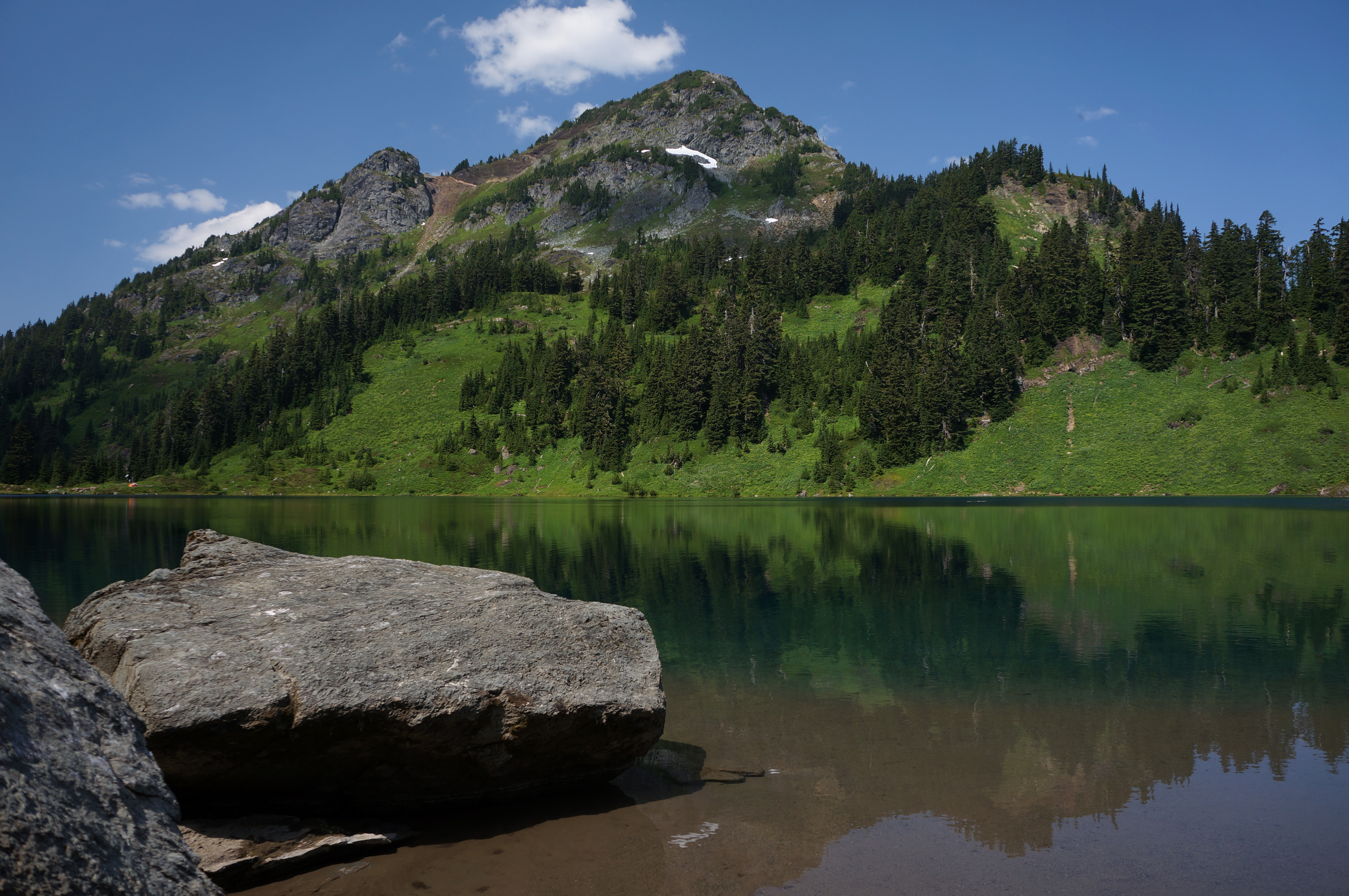
Winchester Mountain reflected in Twin Lakes

The trail head is accessed by the Twin Lakes Road (Forest Service #3065 in the North Fork Nooksack area) off of the Mt Baker Highway. The first 4.5 miles (7.2 km) to the Tomyhoi Lake/Yellow Aster Butte trailhead is well maintained. The remaining 2 miles (3.2 km) of road is not maintained and can only be driven at about 5–15 miles per hour (8–24 km/h) by 4x4 vehicles with high clearance. The unmaintained portion of road is often washed out in the early part of the season and is only fixed up by the miners at the Lone Jack mine, provided they decide to operate the mine that year based on the price of gold.
