= Goat Mountain (Whatcom County) =

Mountain in Washington (state), United States

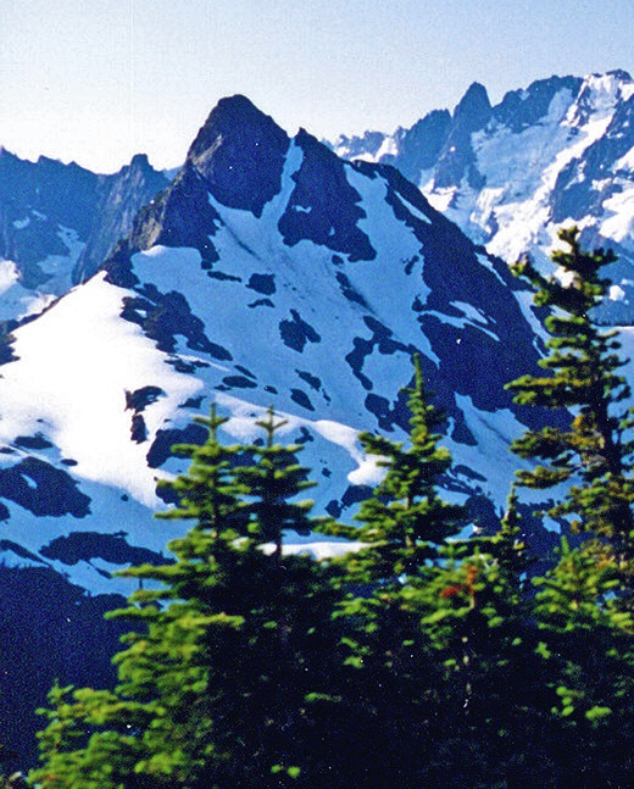
- Goat Mountain from Winchester Mountain Lookout

Highest point
- Elevation: 6,844 ft (2,086 m) NAVD 88
- Prominence: 1,599 ft (487 m)
- Parent peak: Mount Chardonnay (7,020 ft)
- Isolation: 2.75 mi (4.43 km)
- Coordinates: 48°55′43″N 121°37′35″W

Geography
- Location within Washington (state) Location within the United States
- Interactive map of Goat Mountain
- Country: United States
- State: Washington
- County: Whatcom
- Protected area: Mount Baker Wilderness
- Parent range: Cascade Range; North Cascades
- Topo map: USGS Mount Larrabee/Mount Sefrit

Geology
- Rock type: Darrington Phyllite

Climbing
- First ascent: 1904, Frank Calkins and George Otis Smith
- Easiest route: Scramble

Goat Mountain is a 6,844-foot (2,086-metre) summit in the Skagit Range which is a subset of the North Cascades of Washington state. It is located south of Mount Larrabee and north of Mount Shuksan in the Mount Baker Wilderness, which is managed by the Mount Baker-Snoqualmie National Forest. Goat Mountain has a subsidiary 6,725 ft summit known as the west peak, and remnants of what was colloquially known as the Swamp Creek Glacier rest on the northern slope between the two summits. The nearest higher neighbor is Mount Chardonnay, 2.75 mi (4.43 km) to the east. The Silver Tip Mine was located on the south slope of the mountain near the 3,000 ft level. The mine produced silver and gold in the 1940s. Precipitation runoff from the mountain drains into tributaries of the Fraser River and the Nooksack River.

== Climate ==
Goat Mountain is located in the marine west coast climate zone of western North America. Weather fronts originating in the Pacific Ocean travel northeast toward the Cascade Mountains. As fronts approach the North Cascades, they are forced upward by the peaks of the Cascade Range (orographic lift), causing them to drop their moisture in the form of rain or snowfall onto the Cascades. As a result, the west side of the North Cascades experiences high precipitation, especially during the winter months in the form of snowfall. Because of maritime influence, snow tends to be wet and heavy, resulting in high avalanche danger. Due to its temperate climate and proximity to the Pacific Ocean, areas west of the Cascade Crest very rarely experience temperatures below 0 °F (−18 °C) or above 80 °F (27 °C). During winter months, weather is usually cloudy, but, due to high pressure systems over the Pacific Ocean that intensify during summer months, there is often little or no cloud cover during the summer. The months July through September offer the most favorable weather for viewing or climbing this peak.

== Geology ==
The North Cascades features some of the most rugged topography in the Cascade Range with craggy peaks, ridges, and deep glacial valleys. Geological events occurring many years ago created the diverse topography and drastic elevation changes over the Cascade Range leading to the various climate differences.

The history of the formation of the Cascade Mountains dates back millions of years ago to the late Eocene Epoch. With the North American Plate overriding the Pacific Plate, episodes of volcanic igneous activity persisted. In addition, small fragments of the oceanic and continental lithosphere called terranes created the North Cascades about 50 million years ago. The rock of Goat Mountain is Darrington Phyllite of the Easton terrane.

During the Pleistocene period dating back over two million years ago, glaciation advancing and retreating repeatedly scoured the landscape leaving deposits of rock debris. The U-shaped cross section of the river valleys is a result of recent glaciation. Uplift and faulting in combination with glaciation have been the dominant processes which have created the tall peaks and deep valleys of the North Cascades area.

== Gallery ==
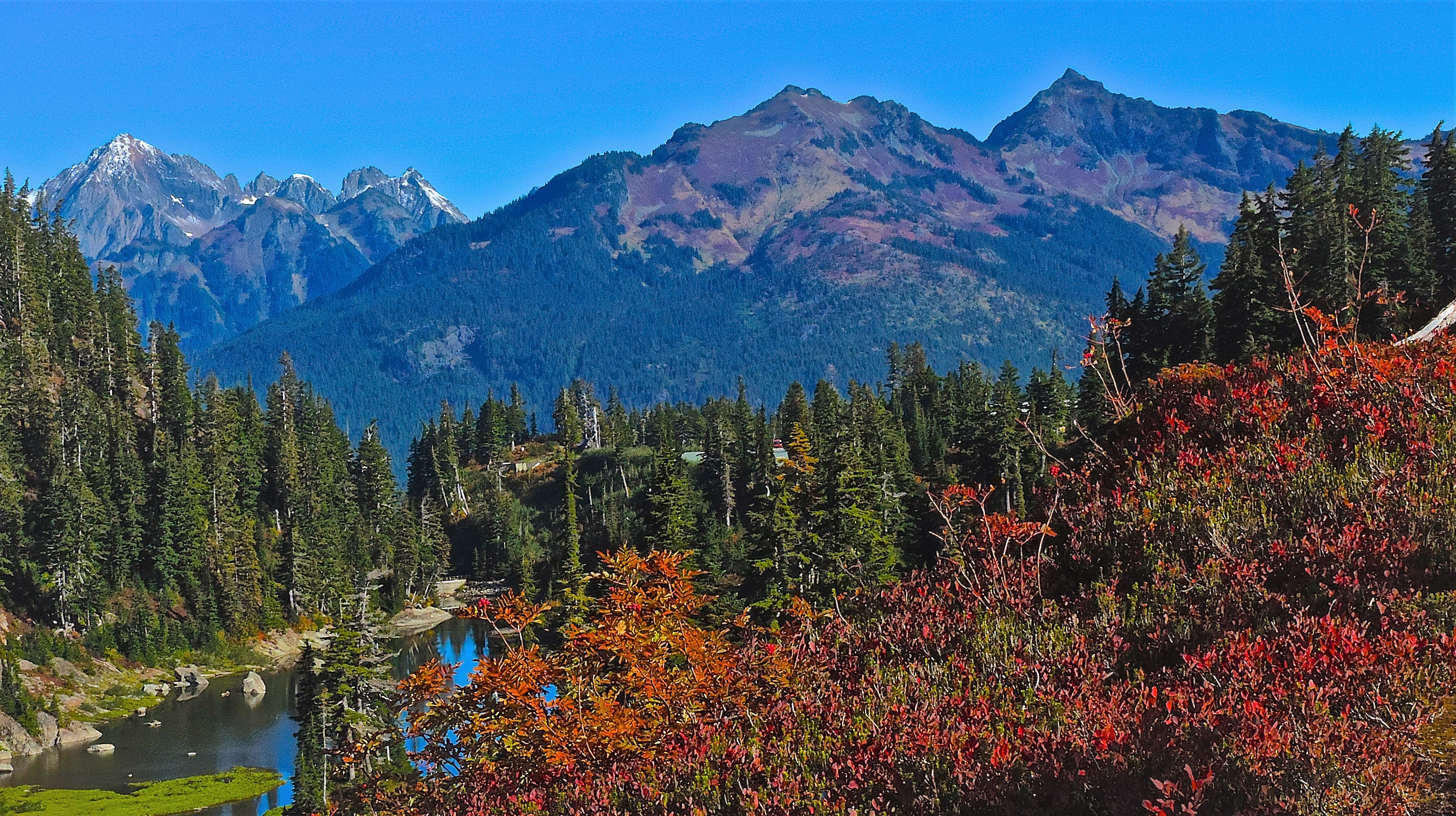
Goat Mountain, with Mt. Larrabee to left

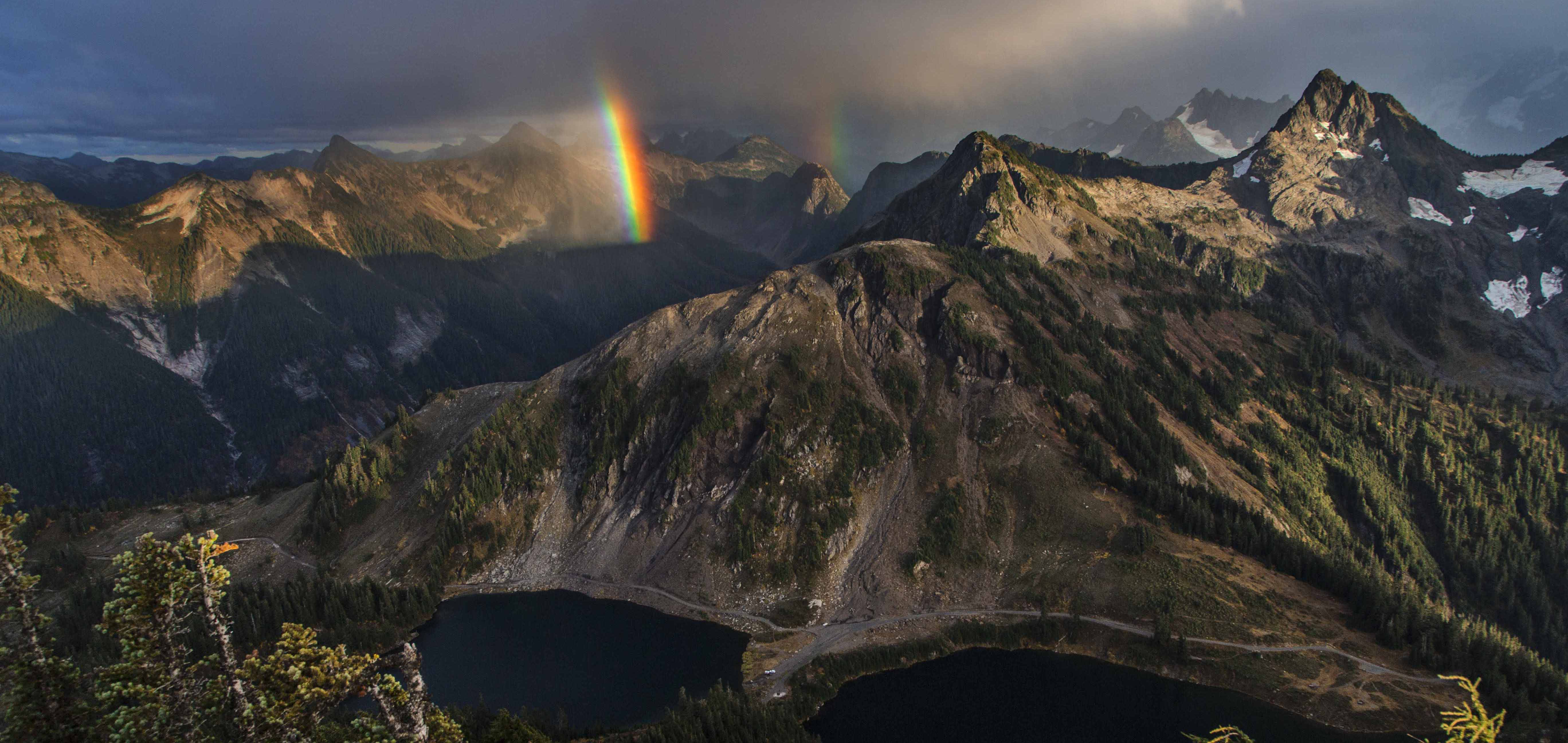
Twin Lakes (bottom), Goat Mountain (upper right)

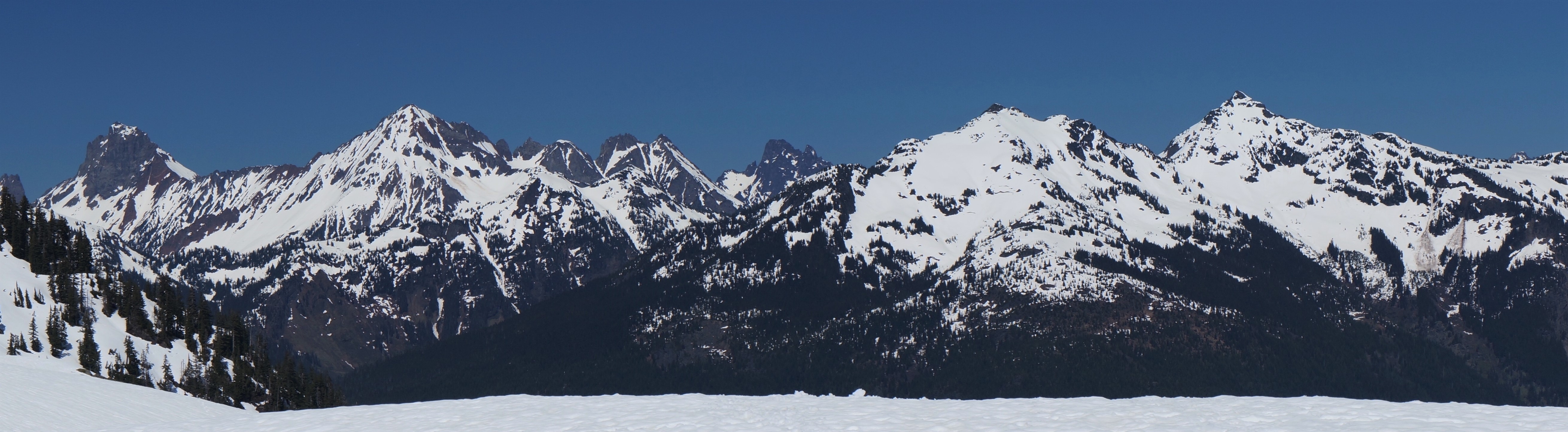
Goat Mountain to right, American Border Peak and Mount Larrabee to left. Slesse centered.

== See also ==
- Geography of the North Cascades
