= Mount Baker National Recreation Area =

Protected area in Washington State, USA

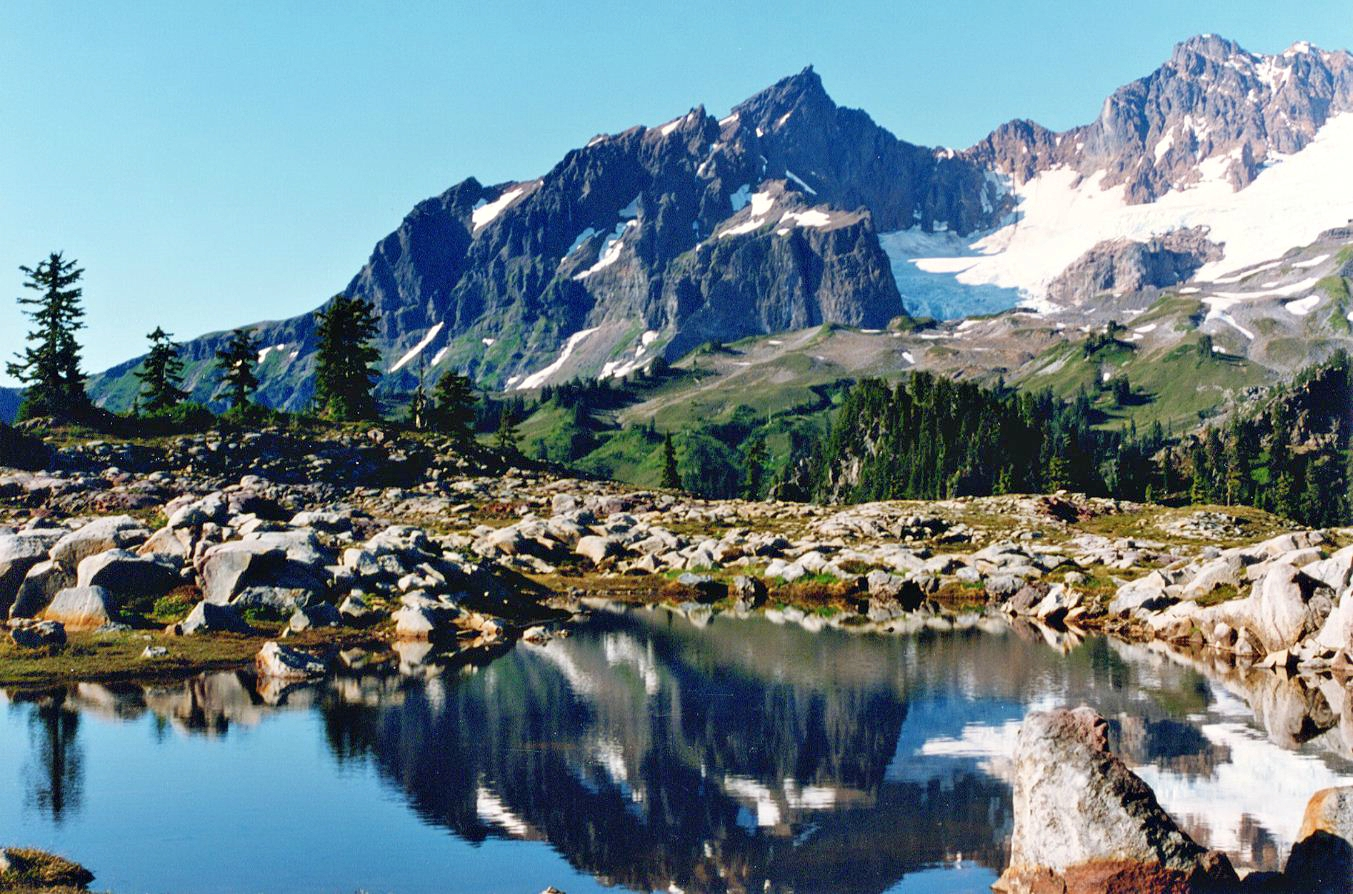
- Reflecting tarn along Park Butte Trail

- Location within the United States
- Location: Whatcom County, Washington, United States
- Nearest city: Concrete, Washington
- Coordinates: 48°43′N 121°50′W
- Area: 8,473 acres (3,429 ha)
- Established: July 3, 1984
- Governing body: United States Forest Service
- Website: Mount Baker National Recreation Area

Mount Baker National Recreation Area is a designated National Recreation Area in the U.S. state of Washington. It is about 15 miles (24 km) south of the Canada–US border within the Mount Baker-Snoqualmie National Forest in northwestern Washington. The recreation area lies northwest of North Cascades National Park and comprises 8,600 acres (3,500 ha).

The recreation area was established in 1984 by an act of the U.S. Congress primarily to protect and conserve the wildlife and recreation in the area. There are also many hiking trails and campgrounds in the recreation area. Mount Baker NRA is adjacent to the Mount Baker Wilderness area, established on the same day.

== History ==
The history of Mount Baker National Recreation Area has been recorded since 1893 when 2.25 million acres of Pacific Forest Reserve was listed which included Mount Baker National Recreation Area. In 1908 this large area was split into two parts. The first part ranged from Canada to the Skagit River. This area of forest was named the Washington National Forest. The second part of the area, which is the Mount Baker National Forest, ranges from the Skagit River to Green River. There had been redistricting of the forest and in 1973 Mount Baker and Snoqualmie National Forest merged. The Mount Baker National Recreation Area is located within this forest.

== Activities ==
The Mount Baker National Recreation Area is roadless and only accessible by hiking. Climbing is a common activity within the recreation area. To reach the summit of Mount Baker, the Coleman Glacier and Easton Glacier routes are used by experienced climbers. Camping is popular. Some campgrounds include parking for recreational vehicles (RVs) or trailers with bathroom amenities and running water. Common campsites are Cathedral Camp, High Camp, Railroad Camp, and Mazama Park Horse Camp. Hiking is popular in the area as well with trails such as Park Butte Trail, Scott Paul Trail, Railroad Grade Trail, Bell Pass Trail, Elbow Lake Trail, and Ridley Creek Trail. Many hiking trails double as horse trails.

After the summer season people may hunt or pick huckleberries at Mount Baker National Recreation Area. In winter it is common for people to use the area to snowshoe, ski, or snowmobile. Snowmobiling however is restricted in some areas and snow must be above two feet deep.

== Environment ==
The Mount Baker National Recreation Area is located in a rich and dense environment. Rivers and streams run within the area due to runoff from alpine glaciers. Cottonwood, redwood, Douglas fir, pacific silver fir, mountain hemlock and western hemlocks are also commonly found growing here along with many other species of trees.

Although Mount Baker is an active volcano, the last eruption with new lava was 6700 years ago. There were hydro-thermal explosions and collapses between the years of 1840 and 1880. Lahars occurred because of these events. Although it is unclear when, Mount Baker will erupt again in the future.

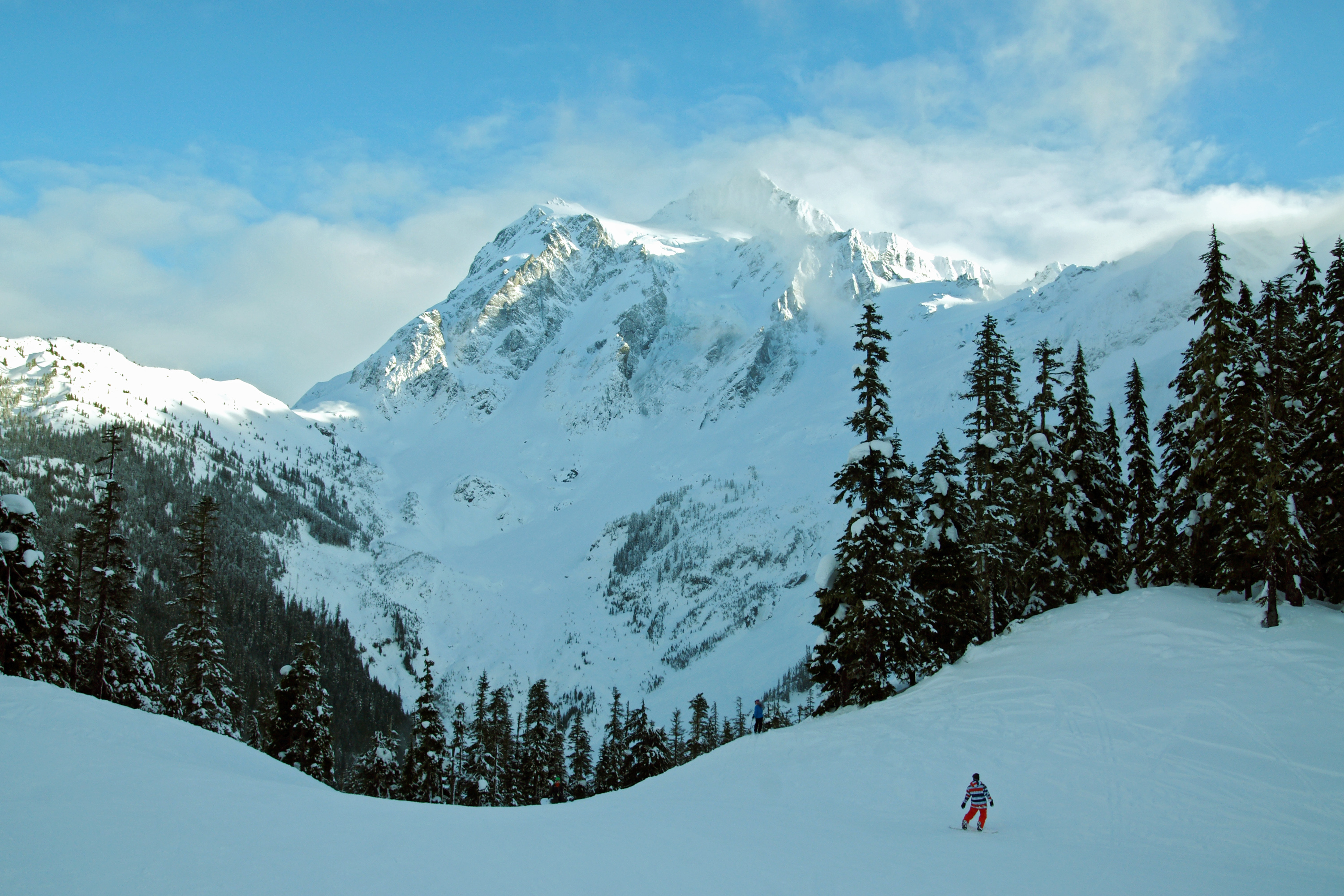
Snow covered Mount Baker with Snowboarder

== Wildlife ==
Mount Baker National Recreation Area is home to many species of wildlife including bears, deer, elk, salmon, trout, marmot, mountain goat, grouse, and bald eagle.
