= Twin Lakes (Whatcom County, Washington) =

Lakes in Whatcom County, Washington

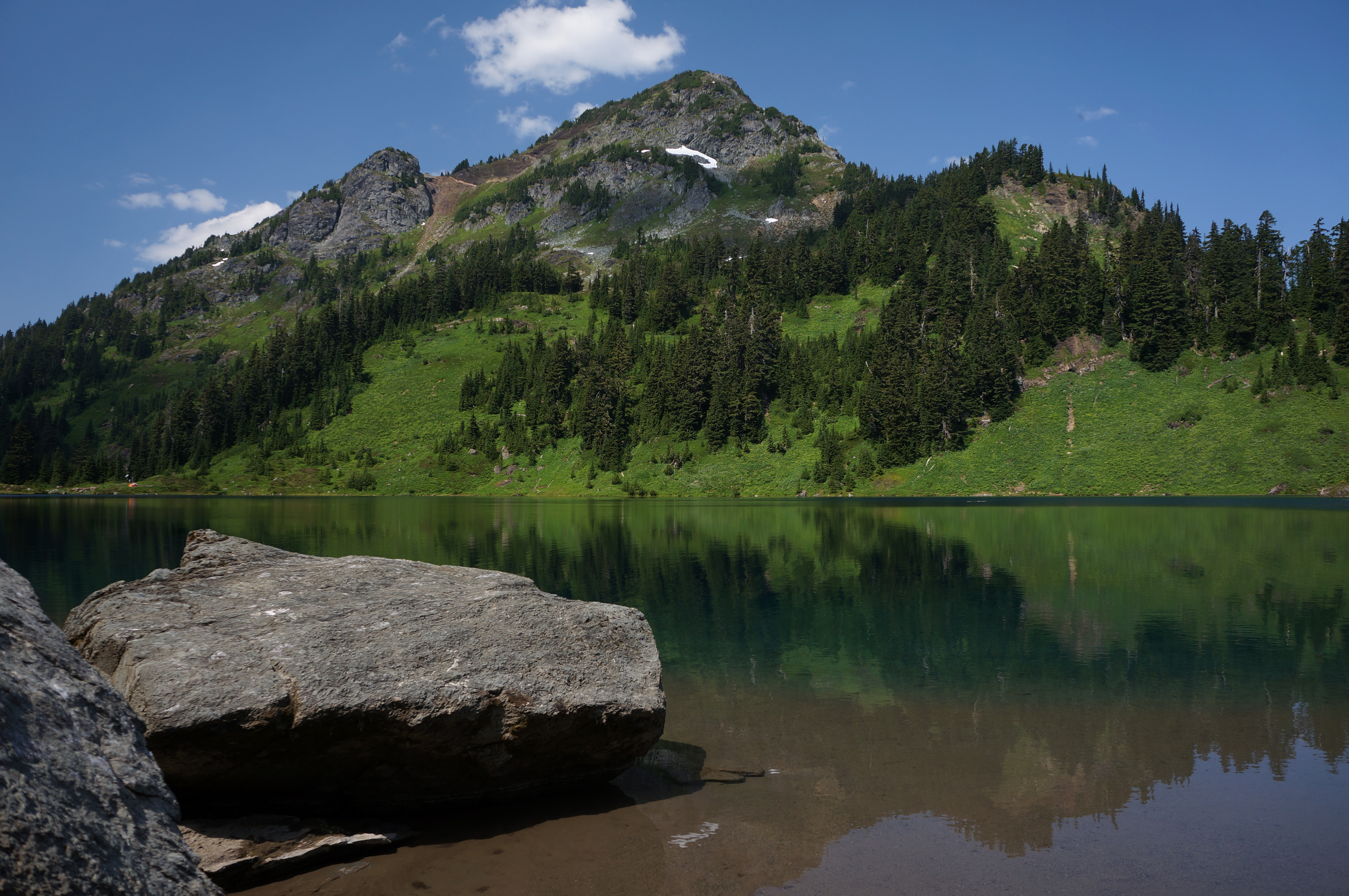
- Upper Twin and Winchester Mountain
- Interactive map of Twin Lakes
- Location: Mount Baker Wilderness, Whatcom County, Washington
- Coordinates: 48°57′4.37″N 121°38′18.16″W
- Type: Lake
- Primary outflows: Swamp Creek, into Nooksack River
- Surface area: Upper: 16.40 acres (6.64 ha) Lower: 18.20 acres (7.37 ha)
- Surface elevation: Upper: 5,181 ft (1,579 m) Lower: 5,165 ft (1,574 m)

Twin Lakes are a pair of lakes located in the Mount Baker Wilderness, in Whatcom County, Washington. They are between Winchester Mountain and Goat Mountain, near Mount Larrabee, a few miles off Mount Baker Highway east of Glacier, Washington.

The road up to the Twin Lakes, FR-3065, is maintained by the United States Forest Service until about 2 miles out from the lakes. The last two miles of road are a remnant from the Mount Baker gold rush, leading up to Lone Jack mine and Gargett mine.

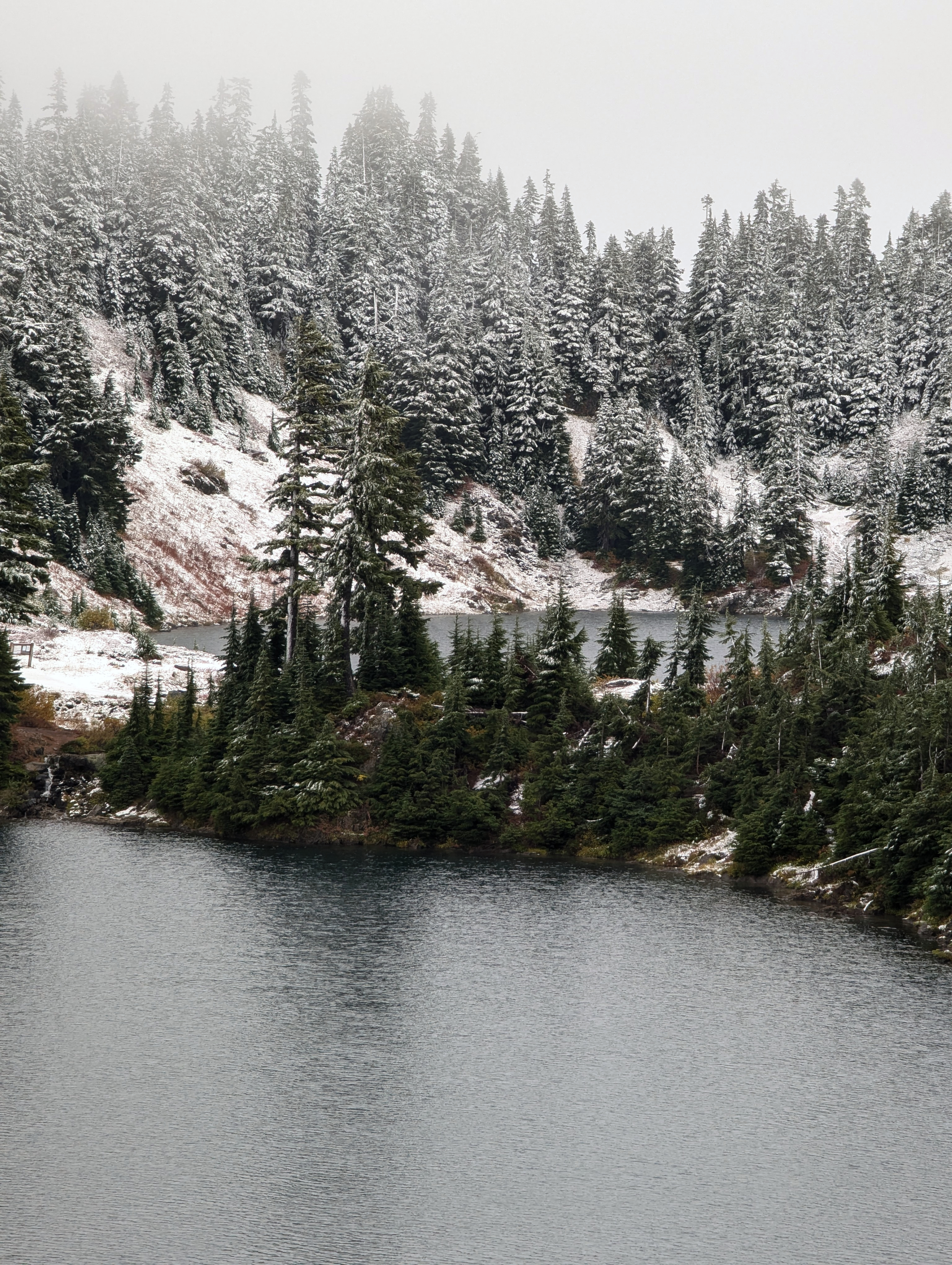
Both twins visible

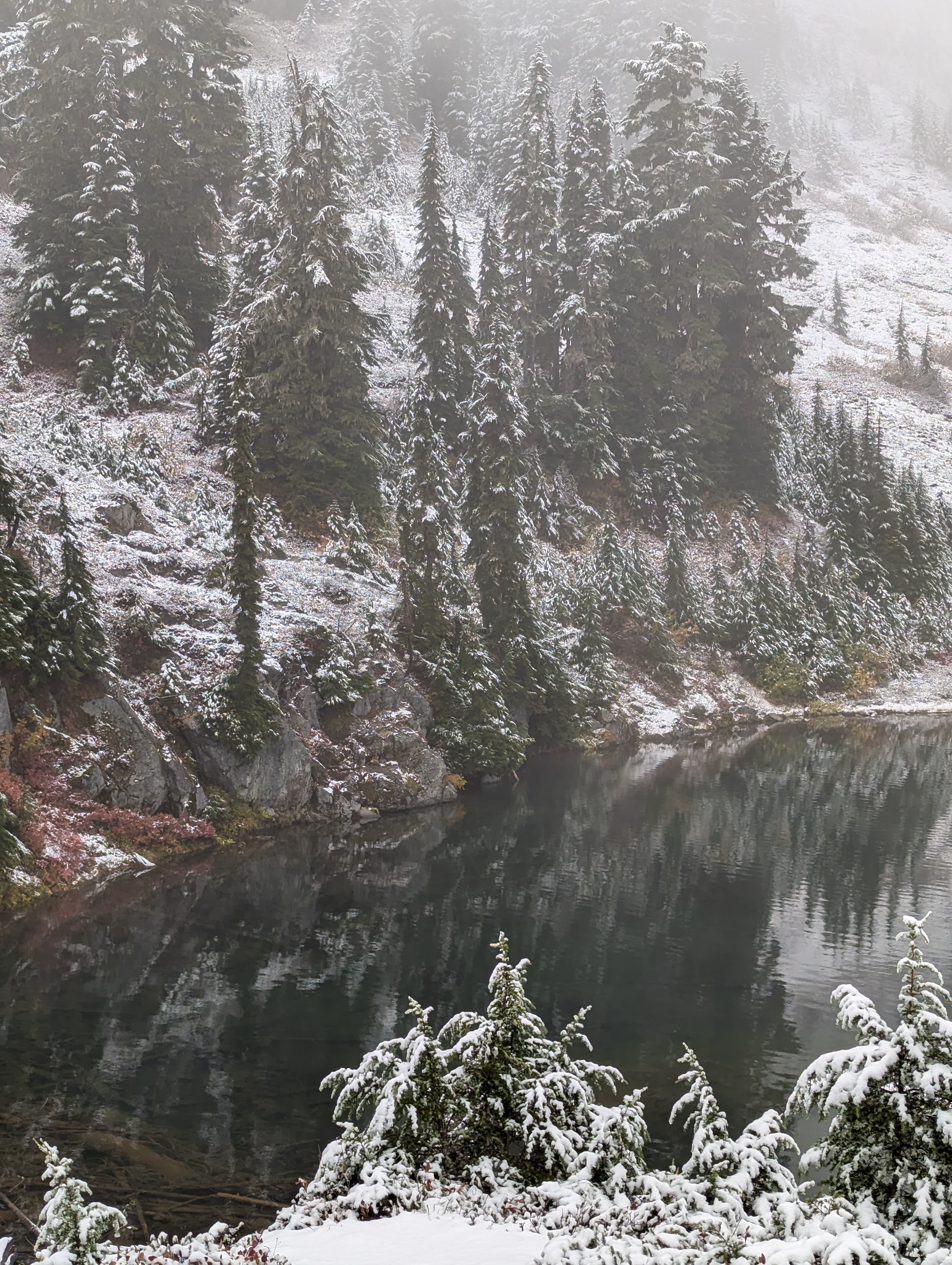
Lower twin

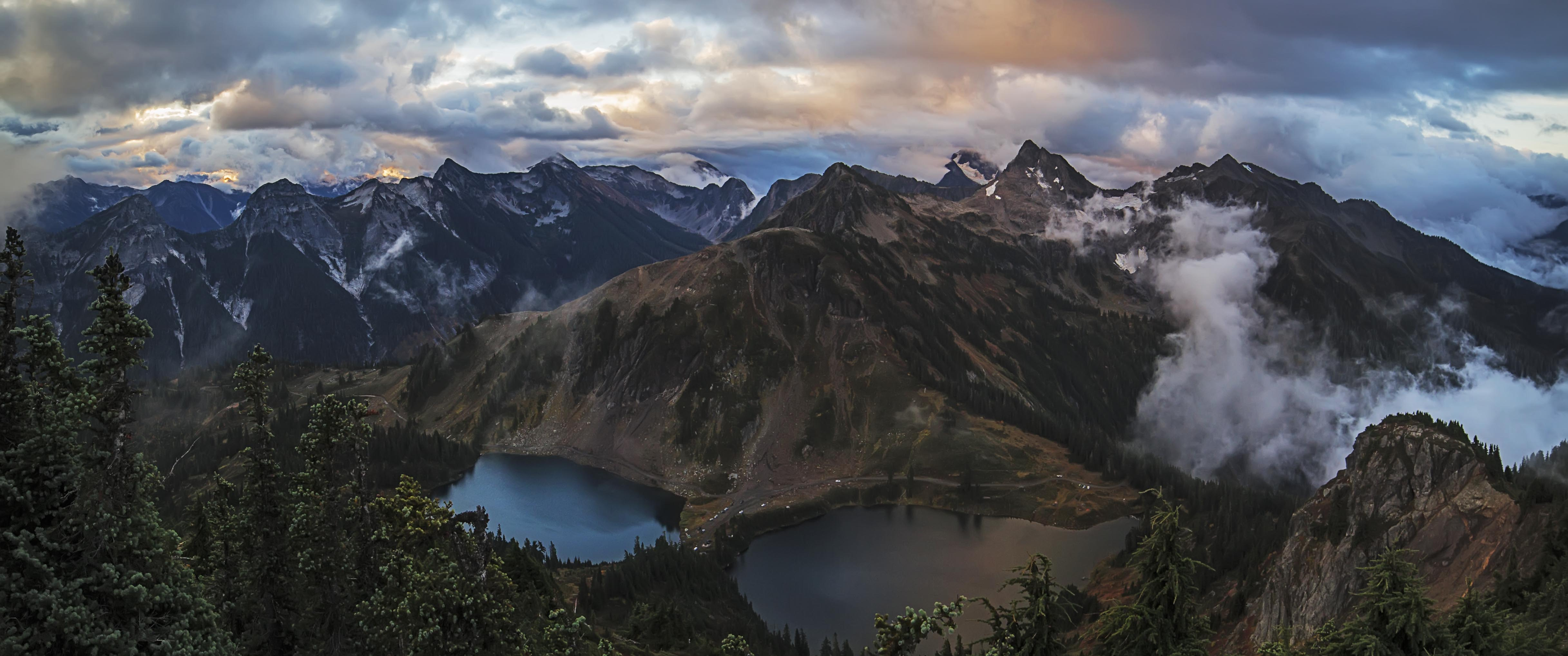
The Twin Lakes from Winchester Mountain

== Recreation ==
Hiking is a popular activity around the lakes, with trails around the lake itself, as well as up to Winchester Mountain Lookout, Mount Larrabee, and Tomyhoi Lake.

There are camping amenities around the lake, including two toilets, parking, and walk-in campsites. Camping at the lakes is free, but a Northwest Forest Pass is required to park.

The Washington Department of Fish and Wildlife advertises the lakes as having an overabundant amount of brook trout and strongly encourages anglers to fish as much as is legal each day.

== See also ==
- List of lakes in Washington
- Mount Baker Wilderness
