= Tomyhoi Peak =

Mountain in Washington (state), United States

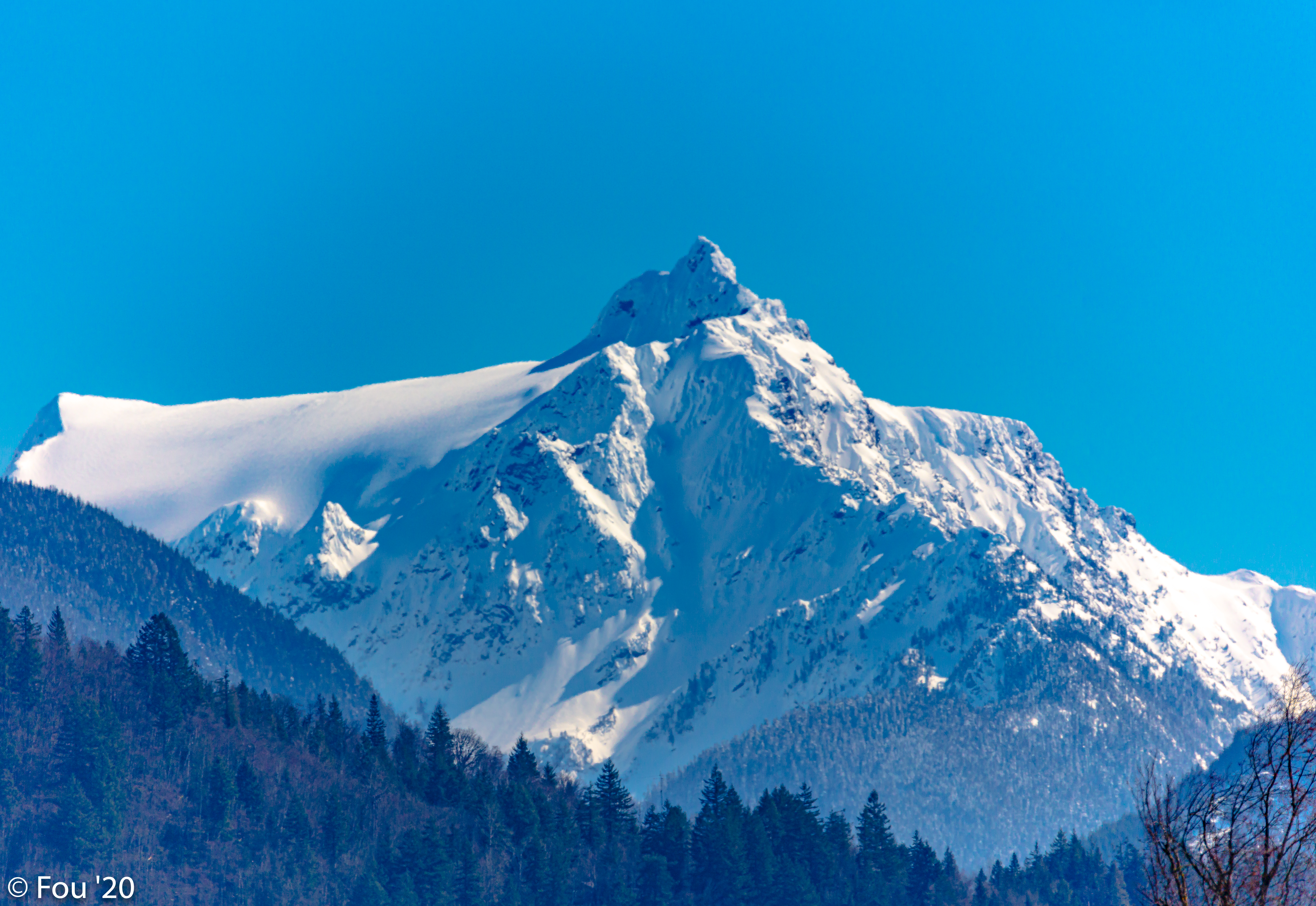
- Tomyhoi Peak seen from Canada

Highest point
- Elevation: 7,439 ft (2,267 m) NAVD 88
- Prominence: 2,035 ft (620 m)
- Parent peak: Mount Larrabee
- Isolation: 2.46 mi (3.96 km)
- Coordinates: 48°58′30″N 121°42′35″W

Geography
- Location within Washington (state) Location within the United States
- Interactive map of Tomyhoi Peak
- Country: United States
- State: Washington
- County: Whatcom
- Protected area: Mount Baker Wilderness
- Parent range: North Cascades
- Topo map: USGS Mount Larrabee

Climbing
- First ascent: 1927 Lage Wernstedt
- Easiest route: Scrambling

Tomyhoi Peak is a 7,439-foot (2,267-metre) Skagit Range mountain situated one mile south of the Canada–United States border, in the North Cascades of Washington state. It is located west of Mount Larrabee and within the Mount Baker Wilderness, which is part of the Mount Baker-Snoqualmie National Forest. This mountain's toponym was officially adopted in 1913 by the U.S. Board on Geographic Names.

The nearest higher peak is Canadian Border Peak, 2.4 miles (3.9 km) to the northeast. Precipitation runoff on the east side of Tomyhoi Peak drains into Tomyhoi Lake and Tomyhoi Creek, whereas the west side of the mountain drains into Damfino Creek, all eventually reaching the Chilliwack River in Canada. Tomyhoi Peak is more notable for its large, steep rise above local terrain than for its absolute elevation. Topographic relief is significant as the summit rises over 4,400 feet (1,300 meters) above Damfino Creek in one mile (1.6 km). The unofficially named Tomyhoi Glacier lies on its north flank. The summit offers views of Mount Larrabee, American Border Peak, Canadian Border Peak, Mount Shuksan, and Mount Baker. Access is via the Keep Kool Trail (#699), from the Twin Lakes Road (Forest Service #3065) off of the Mount Baker Highway.

== Climate ==
Tomyhoi Peak is located in the marine west coast climate zone of western North America. Most weather fronts originating in the Pacific Ocean travel northeast toward the Cascade Mountains. As fronts approach the North Cascades, they are forced upward by the peaks of the Cascade Range (orographic lift), causing them to drop their moisture in the form of rain or snowfall onto the Cascades. As a result, the west side of the North Cascades experiences high precipitation, especially during the winter months in the form of snowfall. Because of maritime influence, snow tends to be wet and heavy, resulting in high avalanche danger. During winter months, weather is usually cloudy, but, due to high pressure systems over the Pacific Ocean that intensify during summer months, there is often little or no cloud cover during the summer. Due to its temperate climate and proximity to the Pacific Ocean, areas west of the Cascade Crest very rarely experience temperatures below 0 °F (−18 °C) or above 80 °F (27 °C).

== Geology ==
The North Cascades features some of the most rugged topography in the Cascade Range with craggy peaks, ridges, and deep glacial valleys. Geological events occurring many years ago created the diverse topography and drastic elevation changes over the Cascade Range leading to various climate differences.

The history of the formation of the Cascade Mountains dates back millions of years ago to the late Eocene Epoch. With the North American Plate overriding the Pacific Plate, episodes of volcanic igneous activity persisted. In addition, small fragments of the oceanic and continental lithosphere called terranes created the North Cascades about 50 million years ago.

During the Pleistocene period dating back over two million years ago, glaciation advancing and retreating repeatedly scoured and shaped the landscape. The U-shaped cross section of the river valleys is a result of recent glaciation. Uplift and faulting in combination with glaciation have been the dominant processes which have created the tall peaks and deep valleys of the North Cascades area.

== Gallery ==
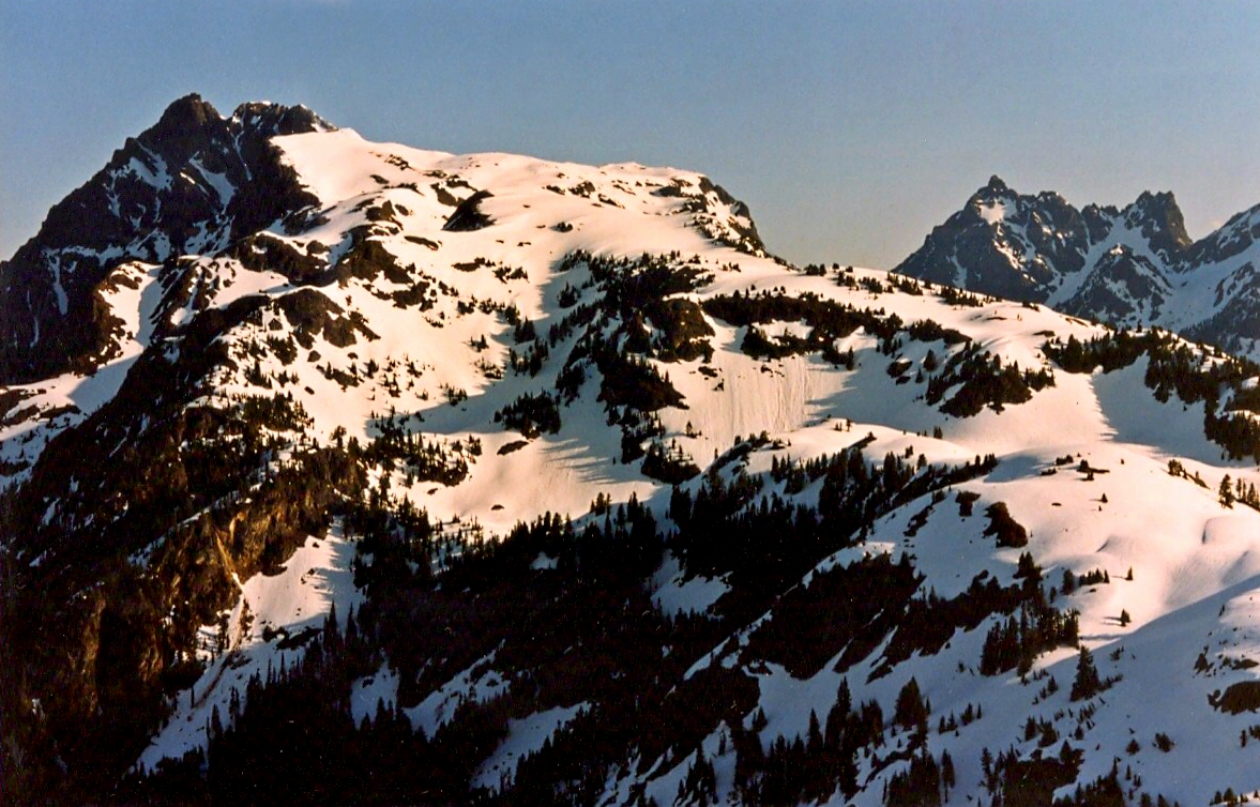
Tomyhoi Peak and Canadian Border Peak

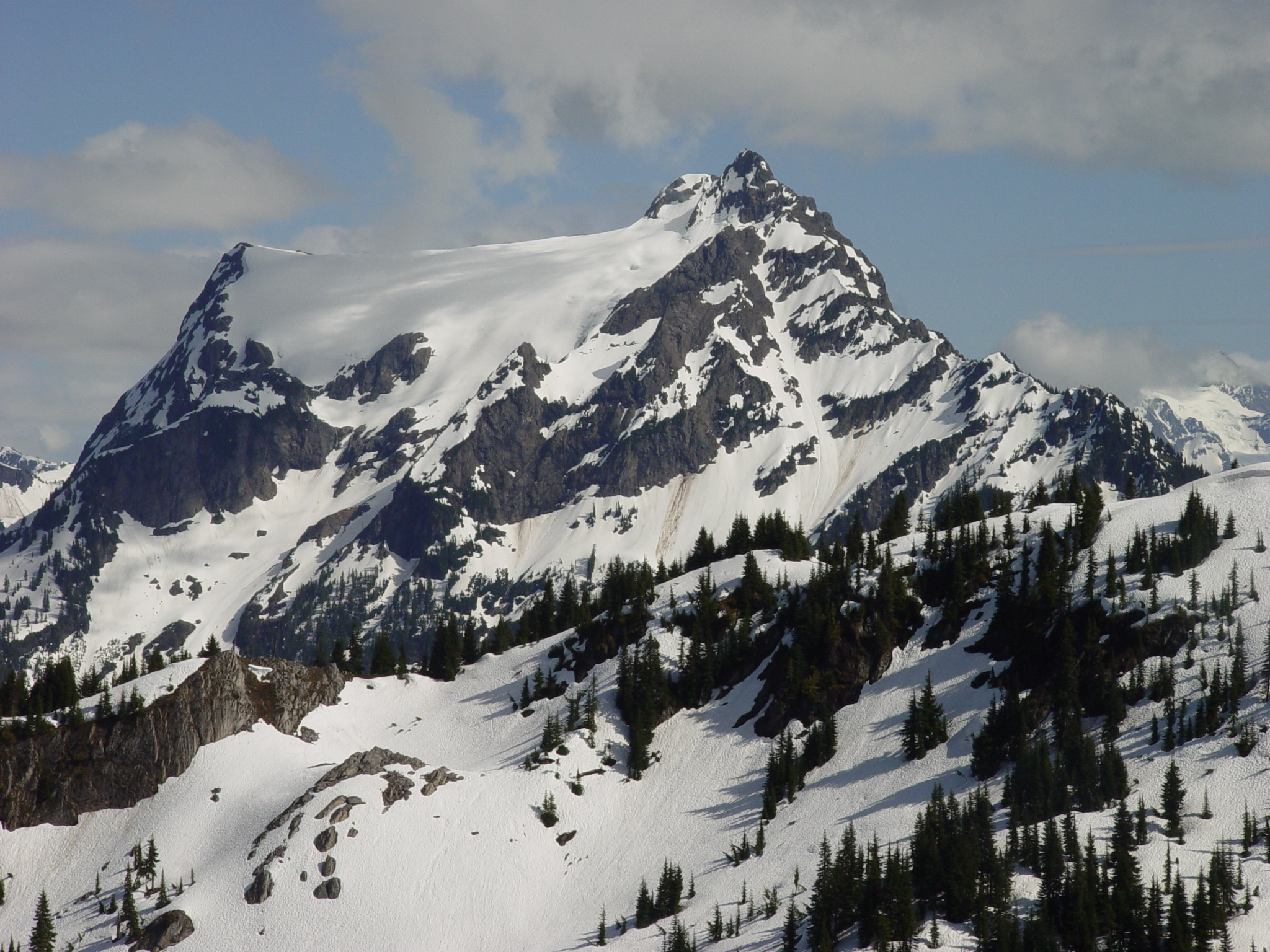
Tomyhoi seen from Mt. McGuire in Canada

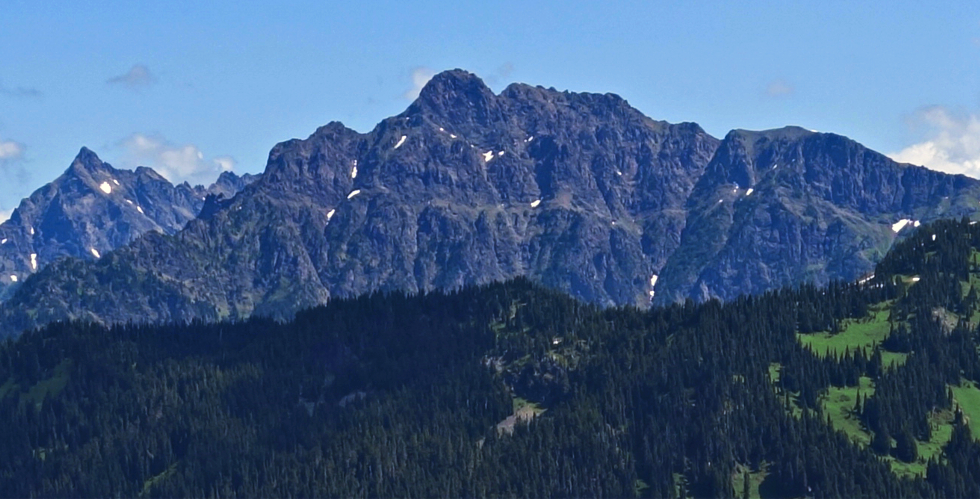
The rugged west face of Tomyhoi Peak

== See also ==
- Geography of Washington (state)
- Geology of the Pacific Northwest
- List of mountain peaks of Washington (state)
