= Tomyhoi Lake =

Lake in Whatcom County, Washington

- Puthishgohap Lake
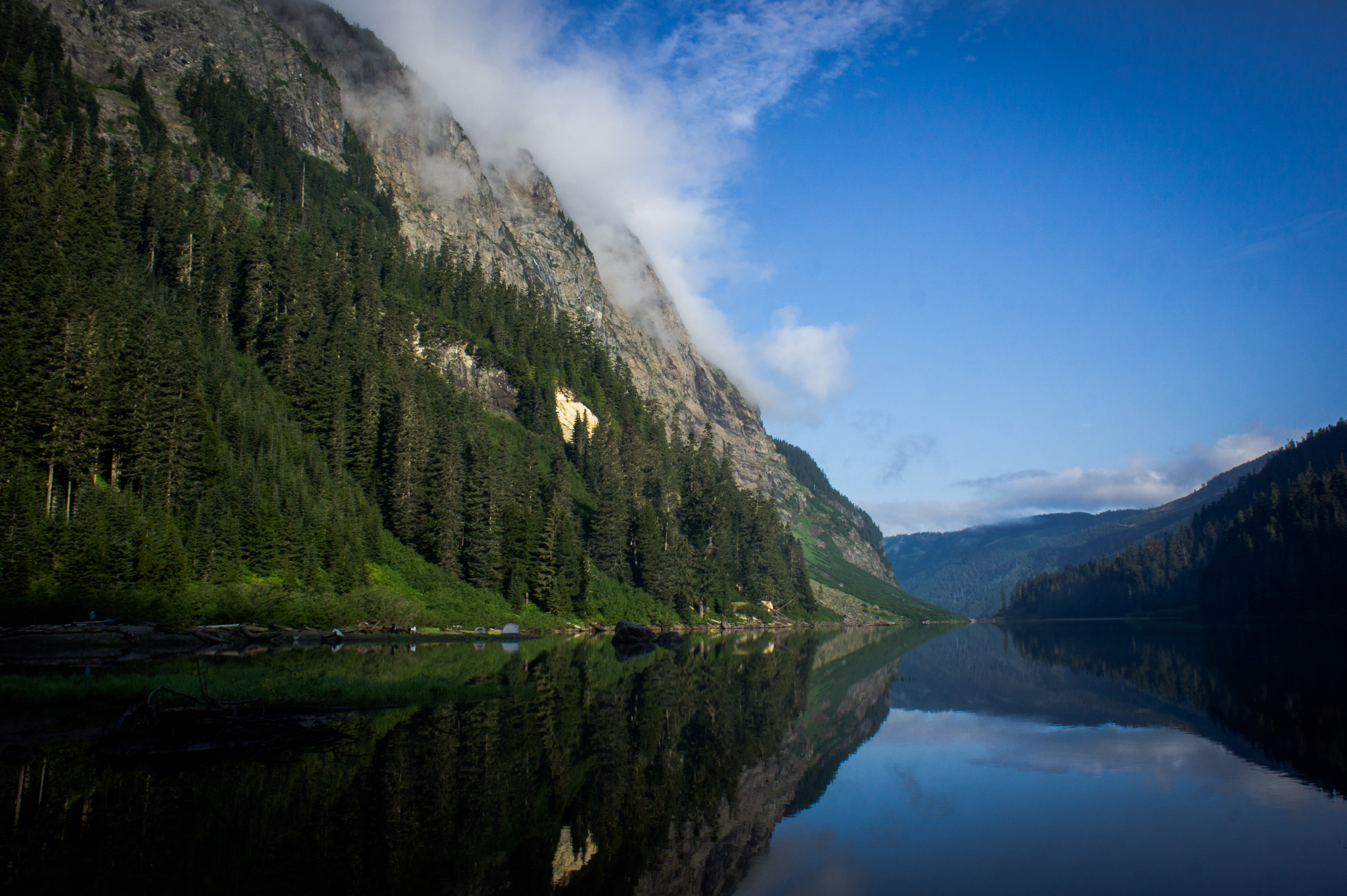
- View from the lake
- Interactive map of Tomyhoi Lake
- Location: Mount Baker Wilderness, Whatcom County, Washington
- Coordinates: 48°58′28.30″N 121°40′52.45″W
- Type: Landslide dam lake
- Etymology: Meaning "high mountain"
- Primary inflows: Tomyhoi Creek
- Primary outflows: Tomyhoi Creek, into Chilliwack River
- Surface area: 61.90 acres (25.05 ha)
- Max. depth: 41 ft (12 m)
- Shore length^{1}: 2.04 miles (3.28 km)
- Surface elevation: 3,727 ft (1,136 m)
- ^{1} Shore length is not a well-defined measure.

Tomyhoi Lake is a lake located in the Mount Baker Wilderness, in Whatcom County, Washington. It is between Tomyhoi Peak, Yellow Aster Butte, and Mount Larrabee, just south of the Canada–United States border.

Access is via Tomyhoi Lake Trail, from FR-3065 (Twin Lakes Road), although due to avalanche debris and downed trees the last half-mile of the trail to the shores of the lake is more difficult than the rest.

The lake was formed by a landslide dam. The water quality of the lake is considered very clear.

== Recreation ==
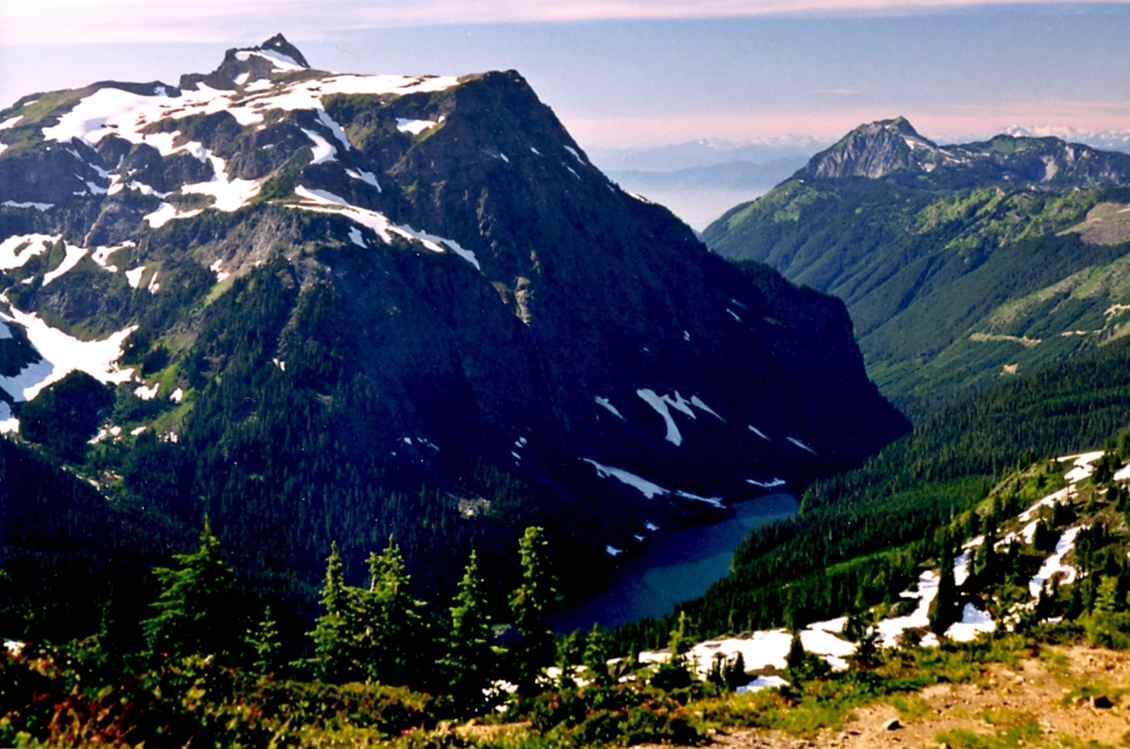
Tomyhoi Lake seen from Winchester Mountain

Hiking is a popular activity around the lake, with a trail up the lake itself, as well as Yellow Aster Butte Trail breaking off. Camping is also available at and around the lake.

The Washington Department of Fish and Wildlife advertises the lakes as having an overabundant amount of brook trout and strongly encourages anglers to fish as much as is legal each day.

== See also ==
- List of lakes in Washington
- Mount Baker Wilderness
