= Mount Larrabee =

Mountain in Washington (state), United States

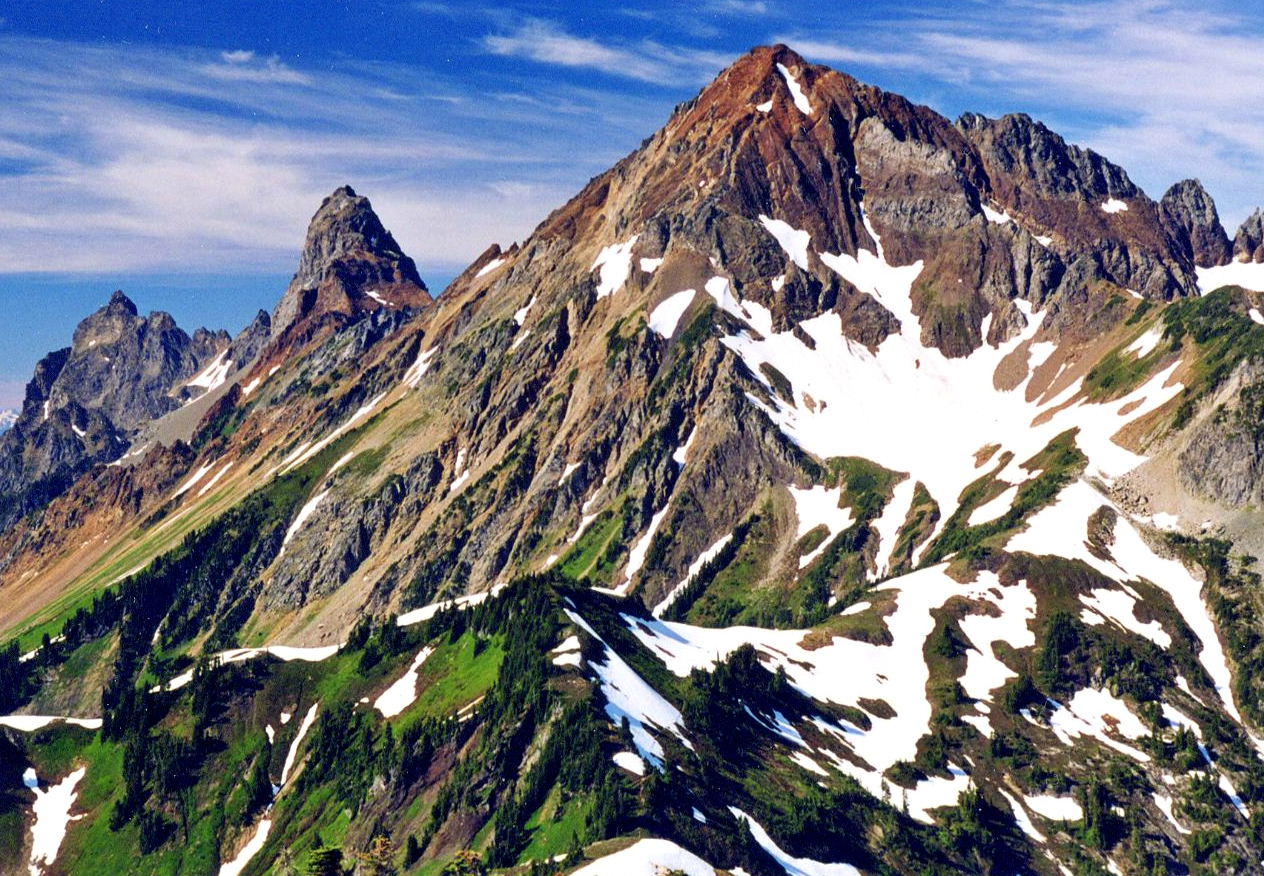
- Mount Larrabee and the Border Peaks seen from Winchester Mountain Lookout

Highest point
- Elevation: 7,865 ft (2,397 m) NAVD 88
- Prominence: 981 ft (299 m)
- Parent peak: American Border Peak (7,994 ft)
- Isolation: 1.34 mi (2.16 km)
- Coordinates: 48°58′45″N 121°38′53″W

Geography
- Location within Washington (state) Location within the United States
- Interactive map of Mount Larrabee
- Country: United States
- State: Washington
- County: Whatcom
- Protected area: Mount Baker Wilderness
- Parent range: Cascade Range; North Cascades; Skagit Range
- Topo map: USGS Mount Larrabee

Climbing
- First ascent: September 11, 1908 by James J. McArthur and party
- Easiest route: class 3 scramble

Mount Larrabee is a 7,865-foot (2,397-metre) Skagit Range mountain summit situated 1.4 mile south of the Canada–United States border, in the North Cascades of Washington state. It is located immediately southeast of American Border Peak within the Mount Baker Wilderness, which is part of the Mount Baker-Snoqualmie National Forest, and near North Cascades National Park. It is notable for its reddish coloring caused by oxidation of Iron in the rock. The rock consists of reddish interbedded and interfolded phyllites and greenstone. Originally known as Red Mountain, the name was changed in 1951 to honor Charles F. Larrabee (1895–1950), of the prominent Larrabee family of Bellingham, Washington. The toponym was officially adopted in 1951 by the U.S. Board on Geographic Names.

Mount Larrabee can be seen from the Mt. Baker Highway near Heather Meadows and Artist Point, as well as from points in the Fraser Valley in Canada. On Larrabee's east ridge are a series of jagged spires called The Pleiades. Larrabee's northwest ridge connects to American Border Peak. Precipitation runoff on the west side of the mountain drains into Tomyhoi Lake and Tomyhoi Creek, whereas the east side of the mountain drains to Silesia Creek, and both creeks flow north to the Chilliwack River in Canada. An unnamed glacier known colloquially as Larrabee Glacier lies below the steep north face. Downslope of that glacier is the Boundary Red Mountain Mine where gold was discovered in the early 1900s. The Gargett Mine was located on the southwest slope north of High Pass, but it didn't produce quality ore and was abandoned.

The summit offers views of Tomyhoi Peak, American Border Peak, Slesse Mountain, Mount Challenger, the Picket Range, Mount Shuksan, and Mount Baker. Normal access is via the Twin Lakes Road and High Pass Trail. The Winchester Mountain Lookout provides a vantage to photograph Larrabee, and shelter to sleep under a roof.

== Climate ==
Mount Larrabee is located in the marine west coast climate zone of western North America.

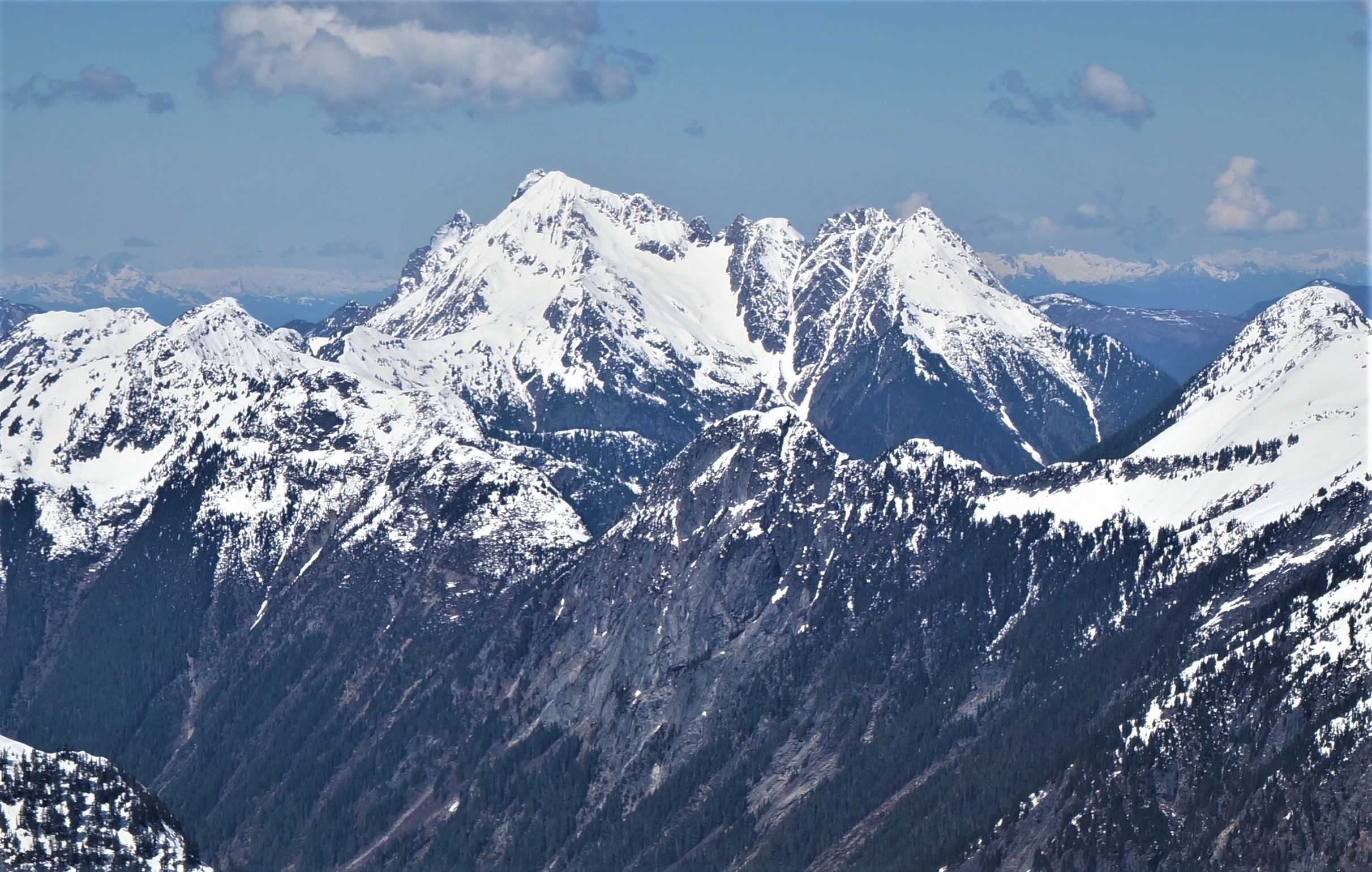
Larrabee from Ruth Mountain

Weather fronts originating in the Pacific Ocean travel northeast toward the Cascade Mountains. As fronts approach the North Cascades, they are forced upward by the peaks of the Cascade Range (orographic lift), causing them to drop their moisture in the form of rain or snowfall onto the Cascades. As a result, the west side of the North Cascades experiences high precipitation, especially during the winter months in the form of snowfall. Because of maritime influence, snow tends to be wet and heavy, resulting in high avalanche danger. Due to its temperate climate and proximity to the Pacific Ocean, areas west of the Cascade Crest very rarely experience temperatures below 0 °F (−18 °C) or above 80 °F (27 °C). During winter months, weather is usually cloudy, but, due to high pressure systems over the Pacific Ocean that intensify during summer months, there is often little or no cloud cover during the summer. The months July through September offer the most favorable weather for viewing or climbing this peak.

== Geology ==
The North Cascades features some of the most rugged topography in the Cascade Range with craggy peaks, ridges, and deep glacial valleys. Geological events occurring many years ago created the diverse topography and drastic elevation changes over the Cascade Range leading to the various climate differences. These climate differences lead to vegetation variety defining the ecoregions in this area.

The history of the formation of the Cascade Mountains dates back millions of years ago to the late Eocene Epoch. With the North American Plate overriding the Pacific Plate, episodes of volcanic igneous activity persisted. In addition, small fragments of the oceanic and continental lithosphere called terranes created the North Cascades about 50 million years ago.

During the Pleistocene period dating back over two million years ago, glaciation advancing and retreating repeatedly scoured the landscape leaving deposits of rock debris. The U-shaped cross section of the river valleys is a result of recent glaciation. Uplift and faulting in combination with glaciation have been the dominant processes which have created the tall peaks and deep valleys of the North Cascades area.

== See also ==
- Geography of the North Cascades
- Geology of the Pacific Northwest

== Gallery ==
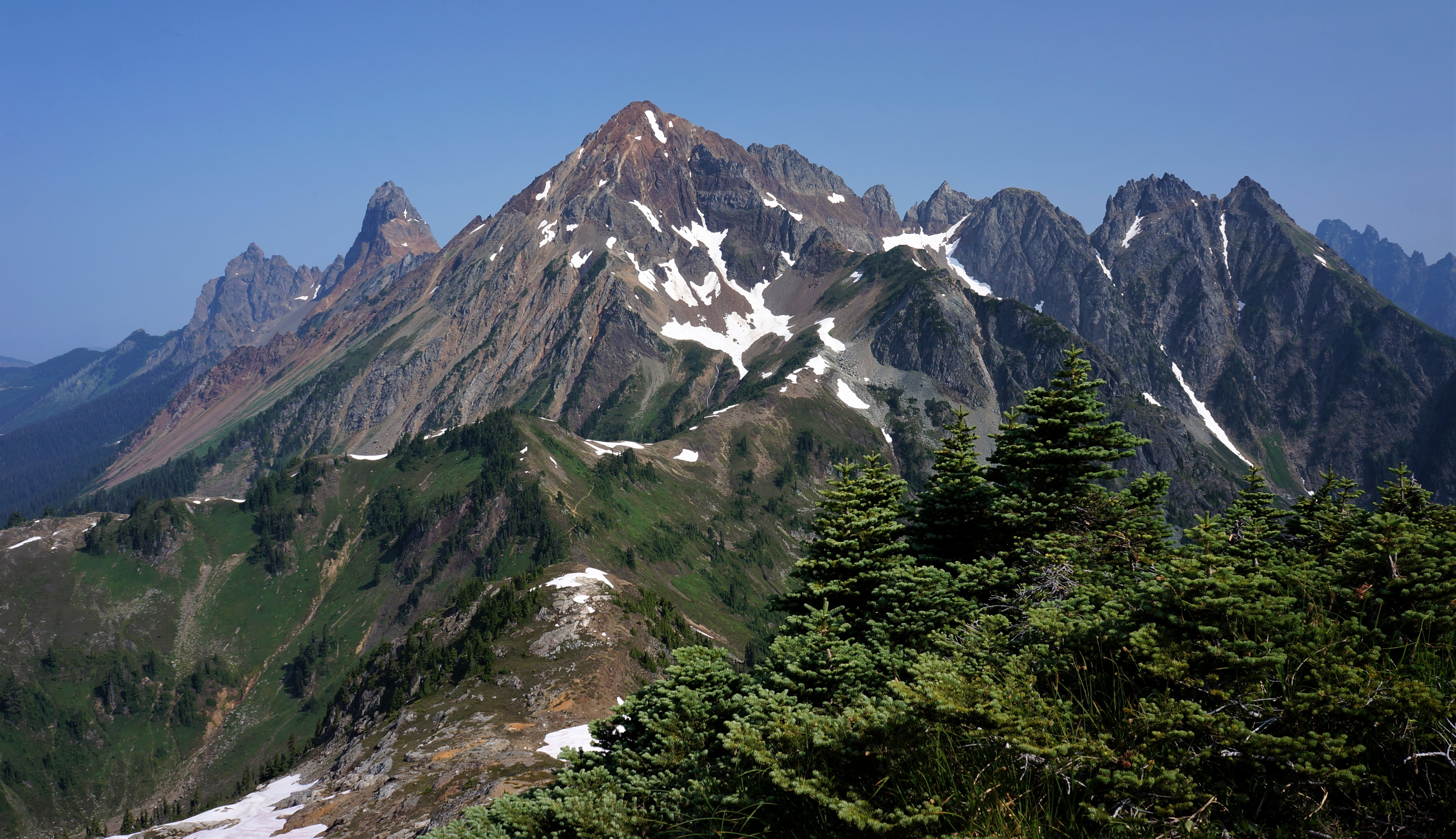
from Winchester Mountain

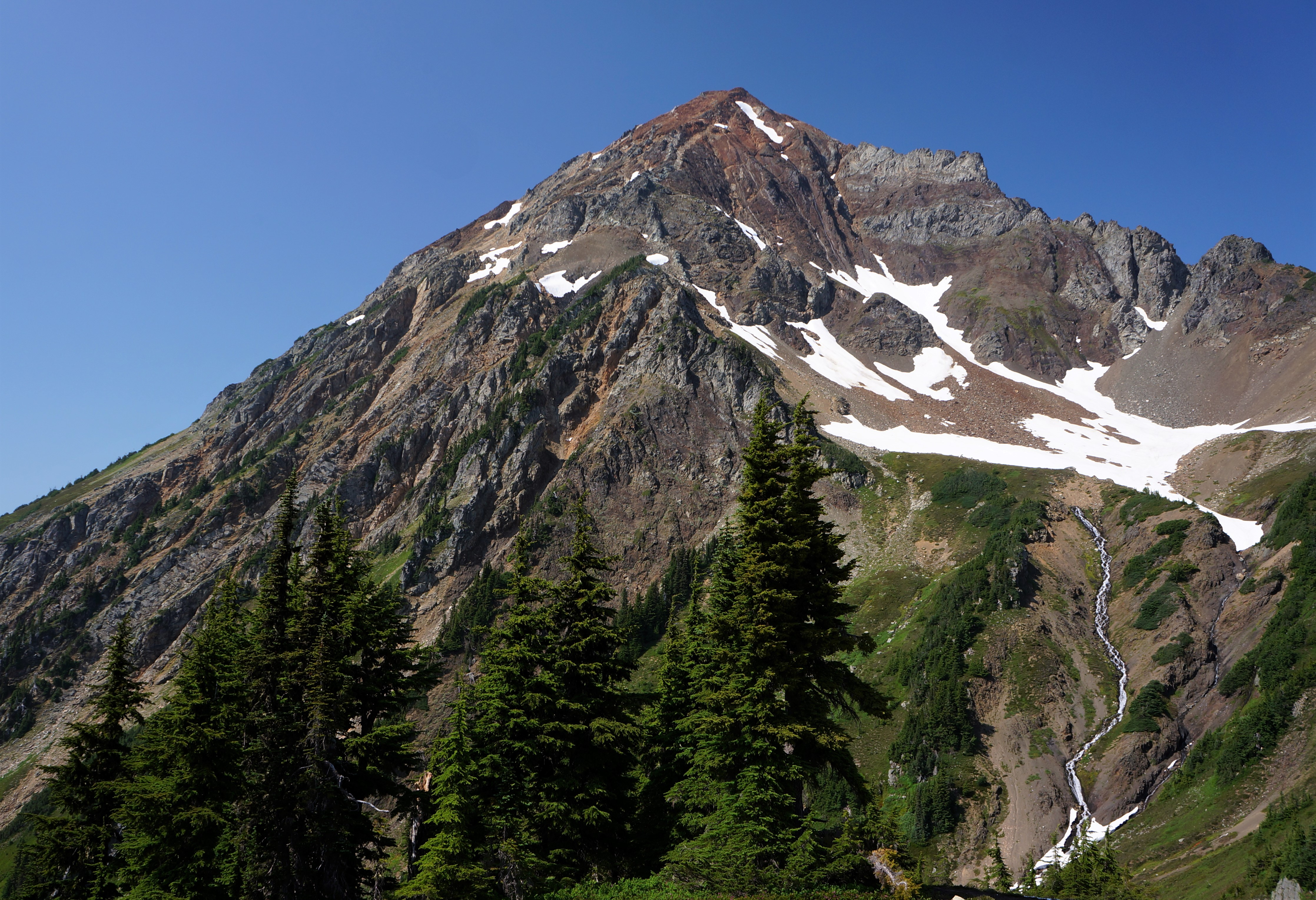
from High Pass

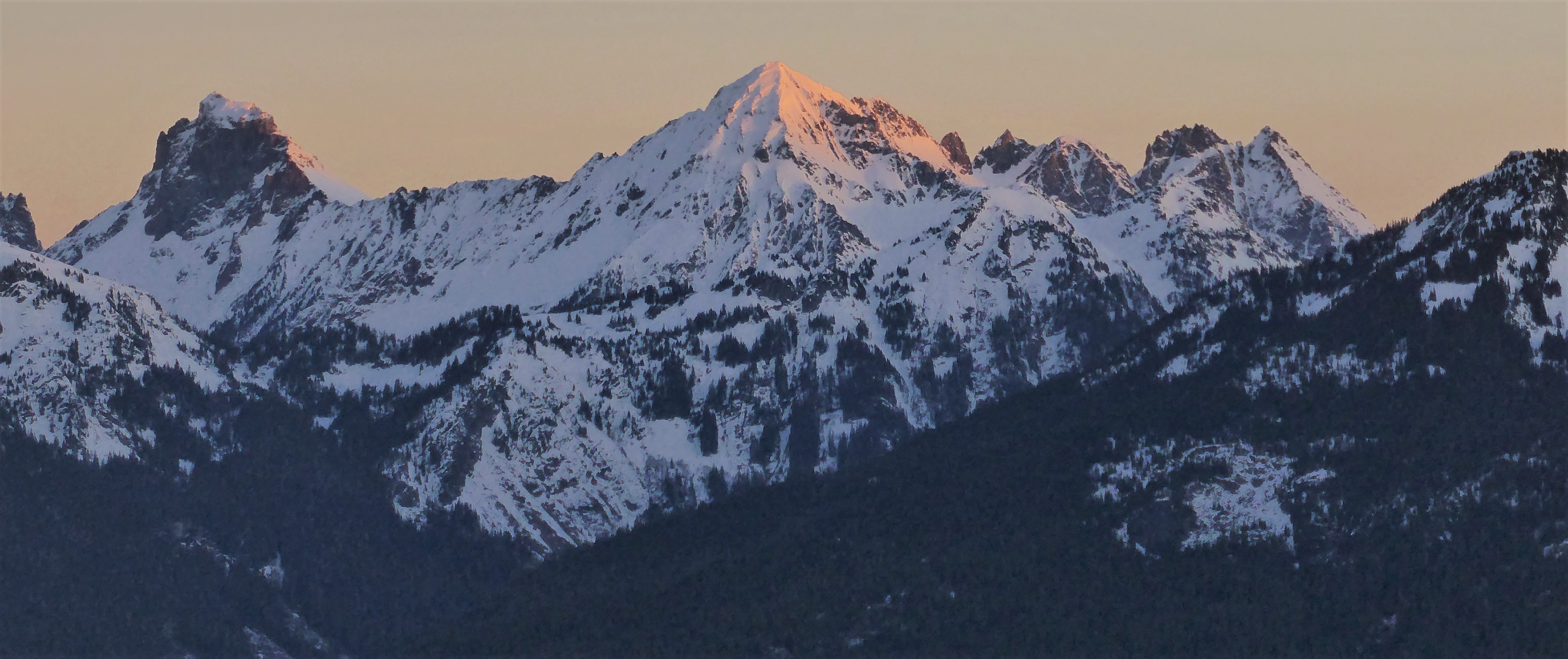
Winter sunrise

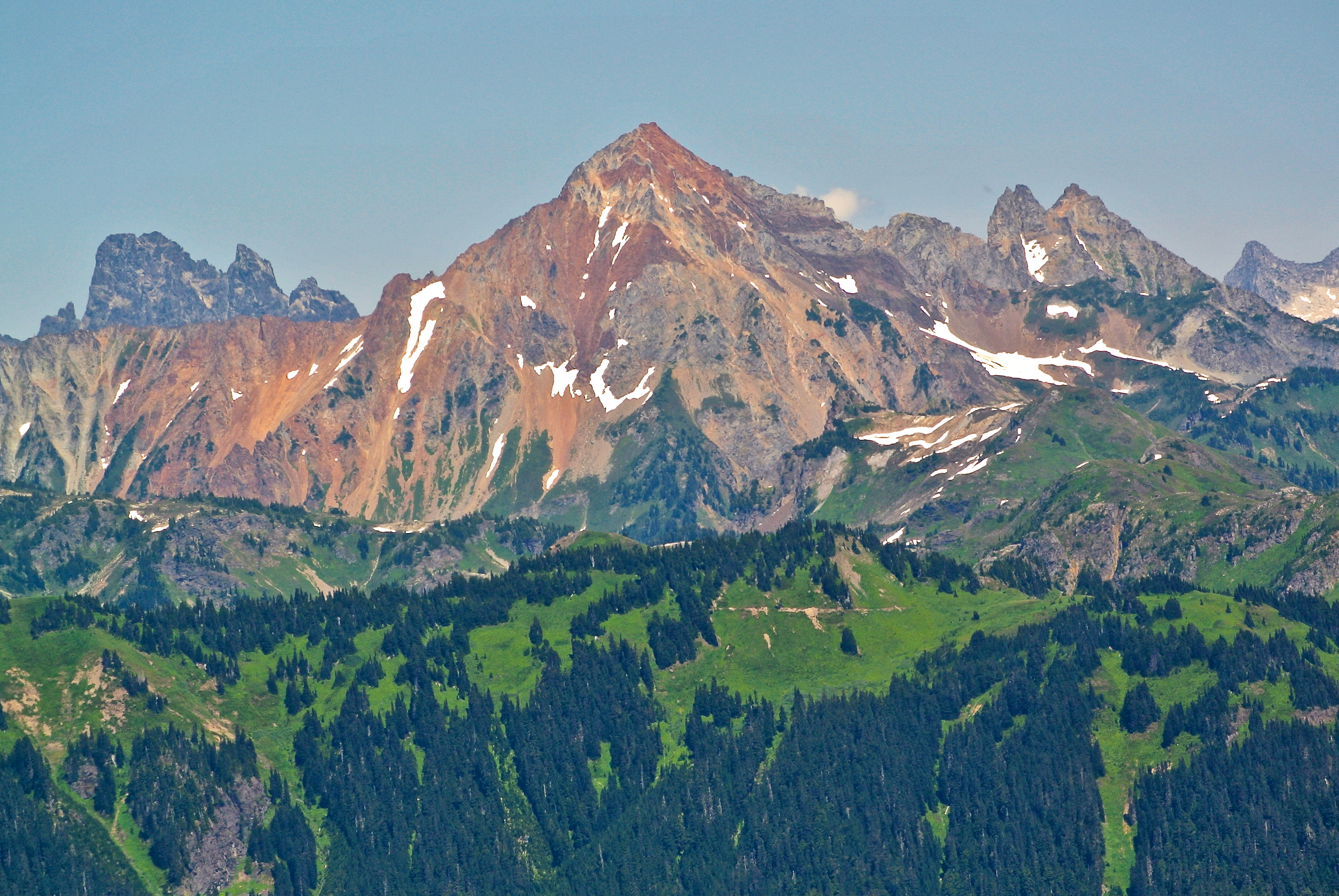
Larrabee centered with the Pleiades to right, and the top of Slesse Mountain showing behind the ridge to left
