= American Border Peak =

Mountain in Washington (state), United States

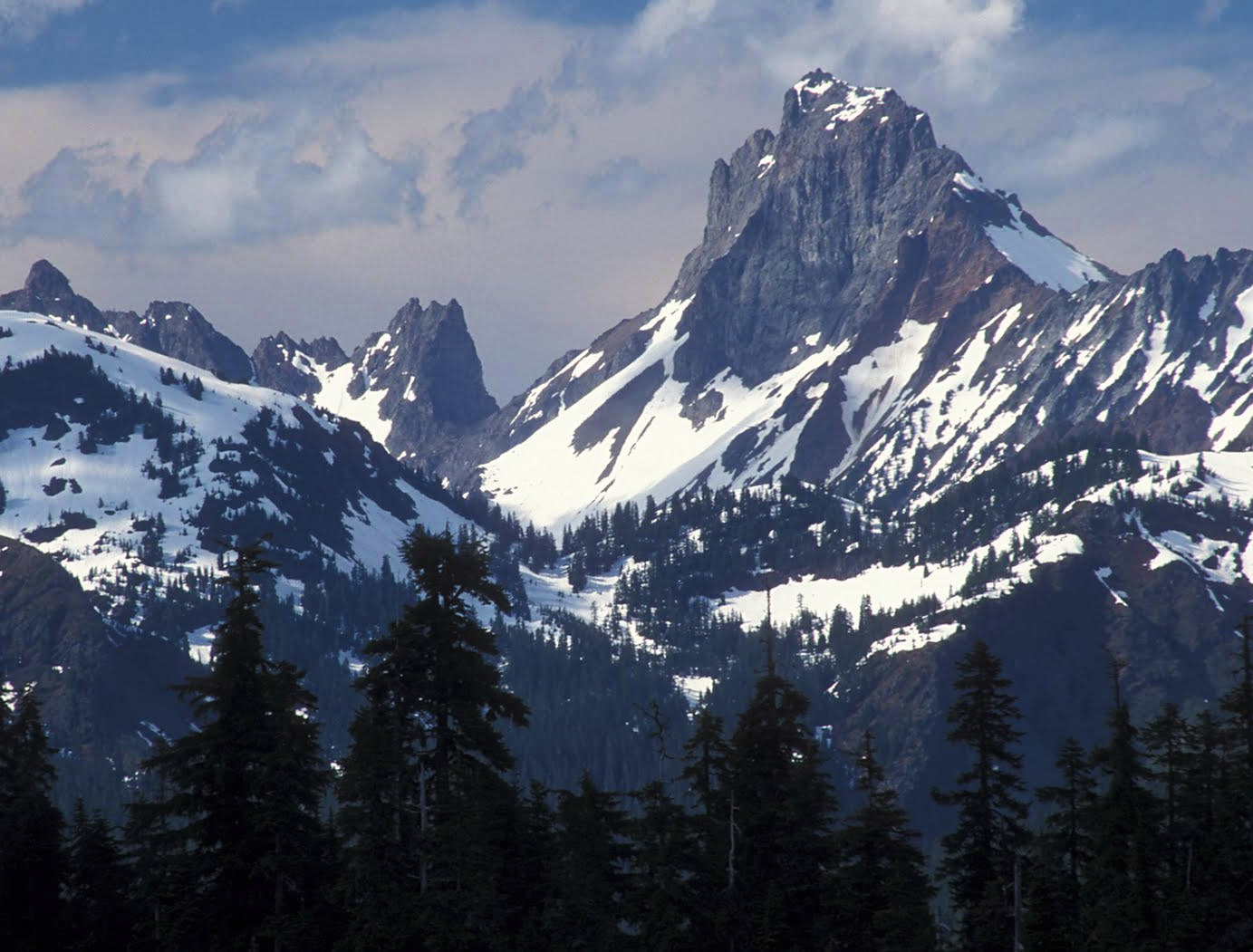
- American Border Peak, south aspect

Highest point
- Elevation: 7,998 ft (2,438 m) NAVD 88
- Prominence: 2,794 ft (852 m)
- Parent peak: Mount Shuksan
- Isolation: 11.56 mi (18.60 km)
- Coordinates: 48°59′43″N 121°39′55″W

Geography
- Location within Washington (state) Location within the United States
- Interactive map of American Border Peak
- Location: Mount Baker Wilderness; Whatcom County, Washington, U.S.
- Parent range: North Cascades
- Topo map: USGS Mt. Larrabee

Climbing
- First ascent: September 14, 1930, by Alec Dalgleish, Tom Fyles, Stan Henderson, R. A. Fraser
- Easiest route: Southeast face (Exposed scramble)

American Border Peak is a mountain just south of the Canada–United States border, in the North Cascades of Washington state, with a corresponding sister peak, Canadian Border Peak, just north along a col connecting to it across the border. It is located within the Mount Baker Wilderness, part of the Mount Baker-Snoqualmie National Forest, near North Cascades National Park. It is notable for its large, steep local relief; however its somewhat rotten rock makes it less appealing to climbers than nearby Slesse Mountain.

== Climate ==
American Border Peak is located in the marine west coast climate zone of western North America.

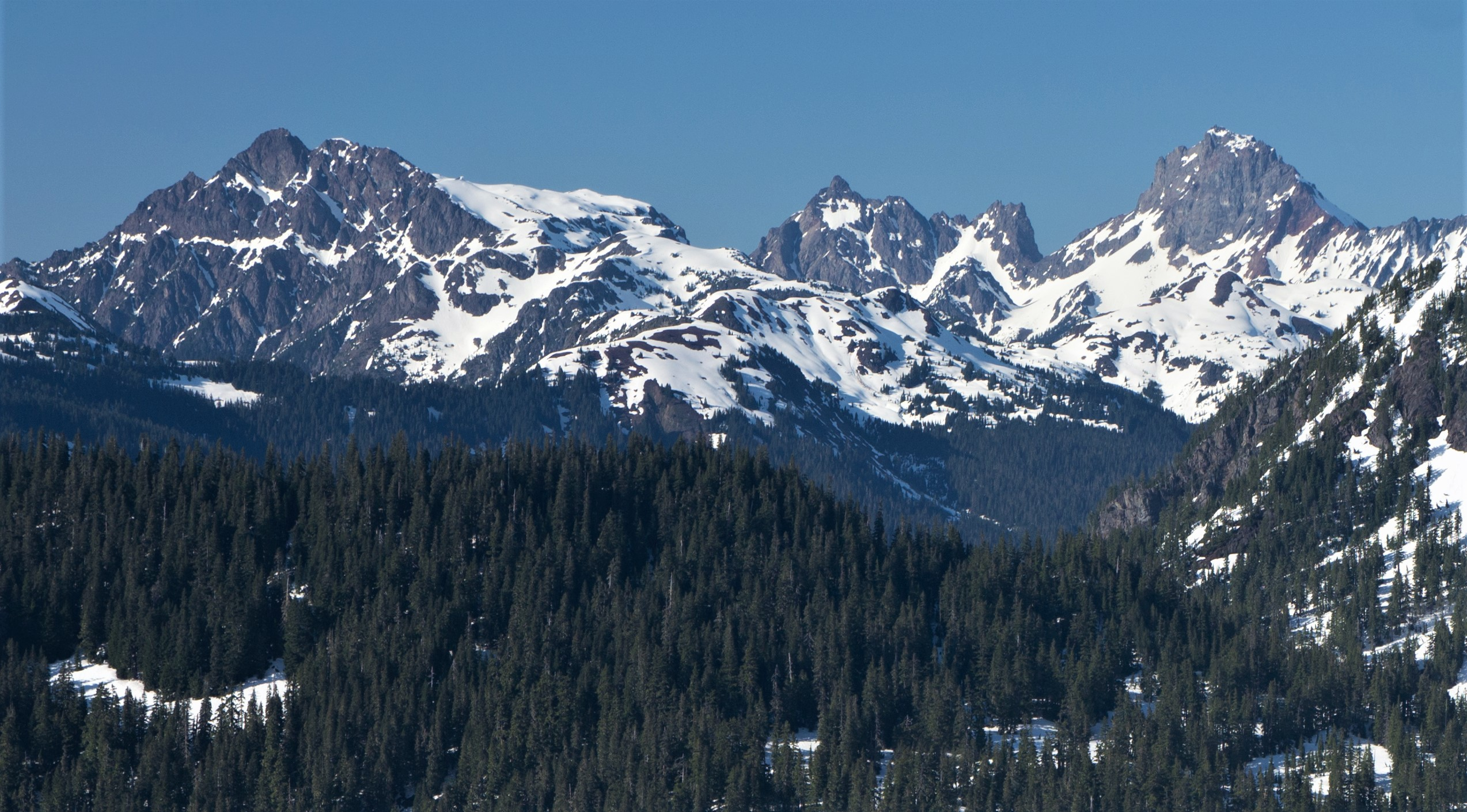
Tomyhoi Peak, Canadian Border Peak, and American Border Peak

Most weather fronts originate in the Pacific Ocean, and travel northeast toward the Cascade Mountains. As fronts approach the North Cascades, they are forced upward by the peaks of the Cascade Range, causing them to drop their moisture in the form of rain or snowfall onto the Cascades. As a result, the west side of the North Cascades experiences high precipitation, especially during the winter months in the form of snowfall. Due to its temperate climate and proximity to the Pacific Ocean, areas west of the Cascade Crest very rarely experience temperatures below 0 °F (−18 °C) or above 80 °F (27 °C). During winter months, weather is usually cloudy, but, due to high pressure systems over the Pacific Ocean that intensify during summer months, there is often little or no cloud cover during the summer. Because of maritime influence, snow tends to be wet and heavy, resulting in high avalanche danger.

== Geology ==
The North Cascades features some of the most rugged topography in the Cascade Range with craggy peaks, ridges, and deep glacial valleys. Geological events occurring many years ago created the diverse topography and drastic elevation changes over the Cascade Range leading to the various climate differences. These climate differences lead to vegetation variety defining the ecoregions in this area.

The history of the formation of the Cascade Mountains dates back millions of years ago to the late Eocene Epoch. With the North American Plate overriding the Pacific Plate, episodes of volcanic igneous activity persisted. In addition, small fragments of the oceanic and continental lithosphere called terranes created the North Cascades about 50 million years ago.

During the Pleistocene period dating back over two million years ago, glaciation advancing and retreating repeatedly scoured the landscape leaving deposits of rock debris. The U-shaped cross section of the river valleys is a result of recent glaciation. Uplift and faulting in combination with glaciation have been the dominant processes which have created the tall peaks and deep valleys of the North Cascades area.

== Gallery ==
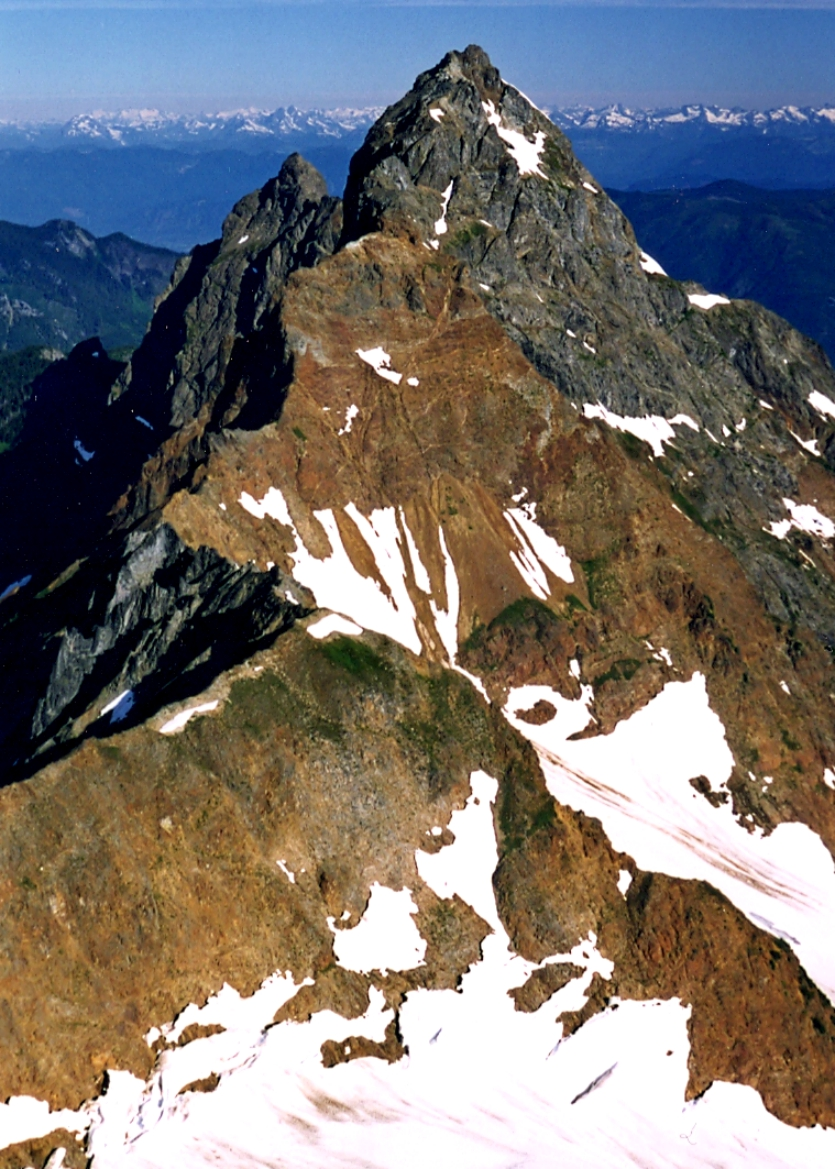
American Border Peak from Mount Larrabee

== See also ==
- Mount Larrabee
- Geography of the North Cascades
