= Mount Baker Wilderness =

Wilderness area in Washington, United States

- IUCN category Ib (wilderness area)
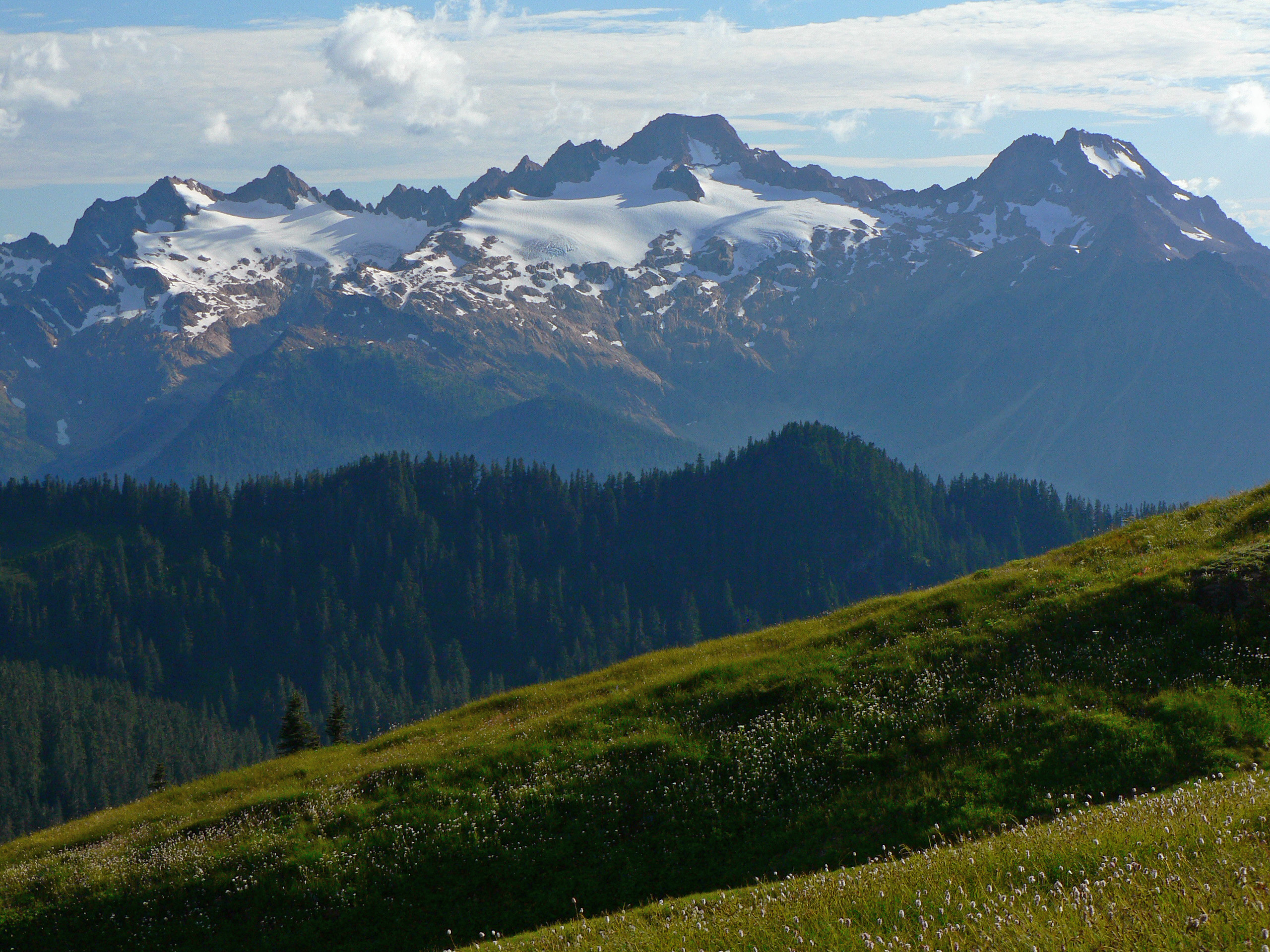
- Twin Sisters Mountain from Grouse Ridge

- Location within the United States
- Location: Whatcom County, Washington, U.S.
- Nearest city: Bellingham, Washington
- Coordinates: 48°48′29″N 121°44′35″W
- Area: 119,989 acres (485.58 km^{2})
- Established: 1984
- Governing body: U.S. Forest Service
- Website: Mt. Baker Wilderness

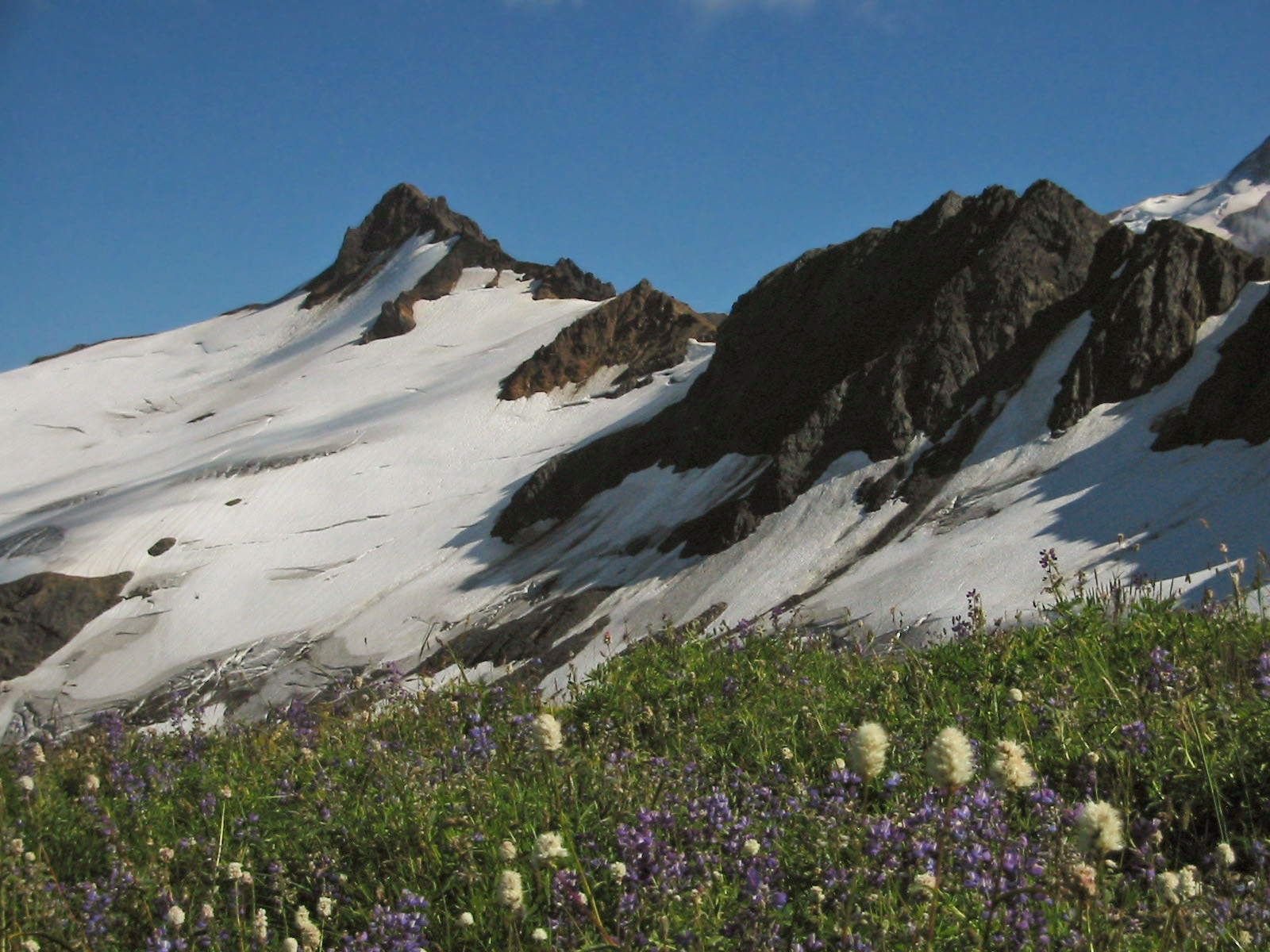
Bistort and lupine bloom on Cougar Divide with Hadley Peak behind.

Mount Baker Wilderness is a 119,989-acre (48,558 ha) wilderness area within the Mount Baker-Snoqualmie National Forest in the western Cascade Range of northern Washington state. Its eastern border is shared with the boundary of the Stephen Mather Wilderness and North Cascades National Park for a distance of 40 miles (65 kilometers). The wilderness extends from State Route 20 north to the Canada–US border. On the west, it is bounded by the foothills of the Puget Sound lowlands.

Almost entirely within Whatcom County, the wilderness lies on the western slopes of the Cascade Mountains. The three forks of the Nooksack River and the Baker River are the major drainages of the wilderness.

== Ecology ==
Vegetative cover is typical of the west slopes of the Cascades including western redcedar, coast Douglas-fir, noble fir, Pacific silver fir, subalpine fir, western hemlock and mountain hemlock, and at higher elevations, alpine meadows. Animals include mountain goats and hoary marmots. On mountains and higher ridges, considerable areas of rock and permanent glaciers (over 10,000 acres (40 km^{2})) occur.

== Geology ==
The terrain is rugged, with steep slopes and numerous ridges dissected by small intermittent or permanent drainages. Mount Baker (10,420 feet (3,180 m)), an active volcano, is one of the area's most distinctive features. The mountain periodically exhibits thermal activity. The most northern of Washington's volcanoes it stands at 10,778 feet (3,285 m). Other major mountains include:

- Twin Sisters Mountain, North Twin (6,650 feet (2,030 m)) –
- Twin Sisters Mountain, South Twin (6,965 feet (2,123 m)) –
- Tomyhoi Peak (7,293 feet (2,223 m)) –
- American Border Peak (7,992 feet (2,436 m)) –
- Mount Larrabee (früher: Red Mountain) (7,821 feet (2,384 m)) –
- Goat Mountain (6,811 feet (2,076 m)) –
- Mount Sefrit (7,165 feet (2,184 m)) –
- Ruth Mountain (7,103 feet (2,165 m)) –
- Hadley Peak (7,470 feet (2,280 m)) –

The wilderness is wholly contained within Mount Baker-Snoqualmie National Forest and is adjacent to the Mount Baker National Recreation Area.

== See also ==
- Mount Baker-Snoqualmie National Forest
- Ecology of the North Cascades
