= History of Stone & Webster =

Stone & Webster logo c.1922

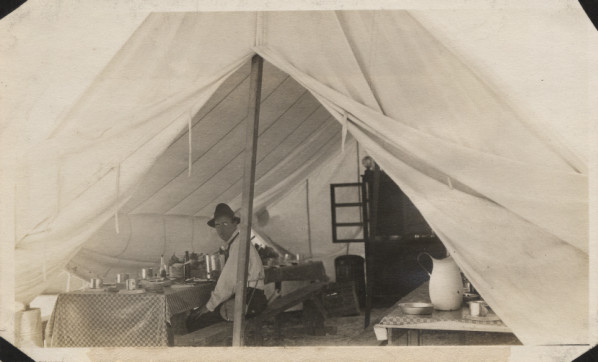
Rex Dunbar Frazier (photographer and representative of Stone & Webster Engineering) in camp following 1915 Galveston Hurricane

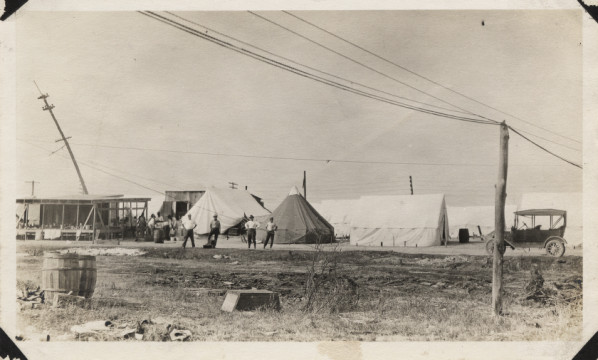
Men relaxing at Stone & Webster Engineering camp at Virginia Point, Texas following 1915 Galveston Hurricane

Charles A. Stone and Edwin S. Webster first met in 1884 and became close friends while studying electrical engineering at the Massachusetts Institute of Technology. In 1890, only two years after graduating, they formed the Massachusetts Electrical Engineering Company. The name was changed to Stone & Webster in 1893. Their company was one of the earliest electrical engineering consulting firms in the United States.

Stone & Webster's first major project was the construction of a hydroelectric plant for the New England paper company in 1890. Stone & Webster not only had valuable insight into developing and managing utilities but they also had keen intuition for businesses to invest in. Through the panic of 1893, Stone & Webster were able to acquire the Nashville Electric Light and Power Co. for a few thousand dollars and later sold it for $500,000.

Throughout the next ten years, Stone & Webster acquired interest in large number of utilities while offering managerial, engineering and financial consulting to a number of independent utility firms. Even though Stone & Webster were not a holding company, their financial and managerial presence meant that they had considerable influence in policy decisions. They would often be paid in utility stock.

Stone & Webster became involved in Washington State engineering projects—Washington's natural resources, and hydroelectric power, and resulting development opportunities brought companies like Stone & Webster to the state—beginning with Puget Sound area street railways. By 1900, they had controlled and merged eight small rail lines in Seattle; soon after, they also took over the street railway systems of Tacoma and Everett. By 1908, Stone & Webster listed thirty-one railway and lighting companies under its management including five located in Washington State: the Puget Sound Electric Railway, Puget Sound International Railway and Power Co., Puget Sound Power Co., The Seattle Electric Co., and Whatcom County Railway and Light Co. Stone & Webster leadership was sensitive to the concerns of large utility holding companies and were careful to emphasize the complete independence of these utilities, but Edwin Webster believed that outside capital was crucial to develop the resources of Washington, and chided those who thought otherwise. In 1905, Stone & Webster bought out the power and lighting properties that were once owned by the Bellingham Bay Improvement Co., including the York Street Steam plant and the partially built Nooksack Falls Hydroelectric Power Plant.Stone & Webster took over construction operations and on September 21, 1906, Bellingham received power from the plant via a 47-mile-long (76 km) transmission line. Despite the independence allowed its subsidiaries, J.D. Ross, superintendent of Seattle City Light issued a report critical of Stone & Webster's presence in Seattle, listing 49 companies under Stone & Webster's management at the time.

== Electric Vehicles ==
William H. Blood Jr. represented Stone & Webster at the inaugural meeting of the Electric Vehicle Association of America.

== Restructuring ==
By 1912, the company, nationally, had divided itself into three specialized subsidiaries:

- Stone & Webster Engineering
- Stone & Webster Management Association
- Stone & Webster Investments

In 1927, Stone & Webster expanded the investments business, merging its securities subsidiaries with the investment banking firm of Blodgett & Co. founded in 1886, to form Stone & Webster and Blodgett Inc. In January, 1946, the name of the business, was changed to Stone and Webster Securities Corporation. Stone and Webster Securities was one of the 17 U.S. investment banking and securities firms named in the United States Department of Justice's antitrust investigation of Wall Street commonly known as the Investment Bankers Case. The Stone & Webster investment banking operations were eventually acquired by Kidder Peabody which already had overlapping ownership.
