= Wells Creek Falls =

Waterfall in Washington (state), United States

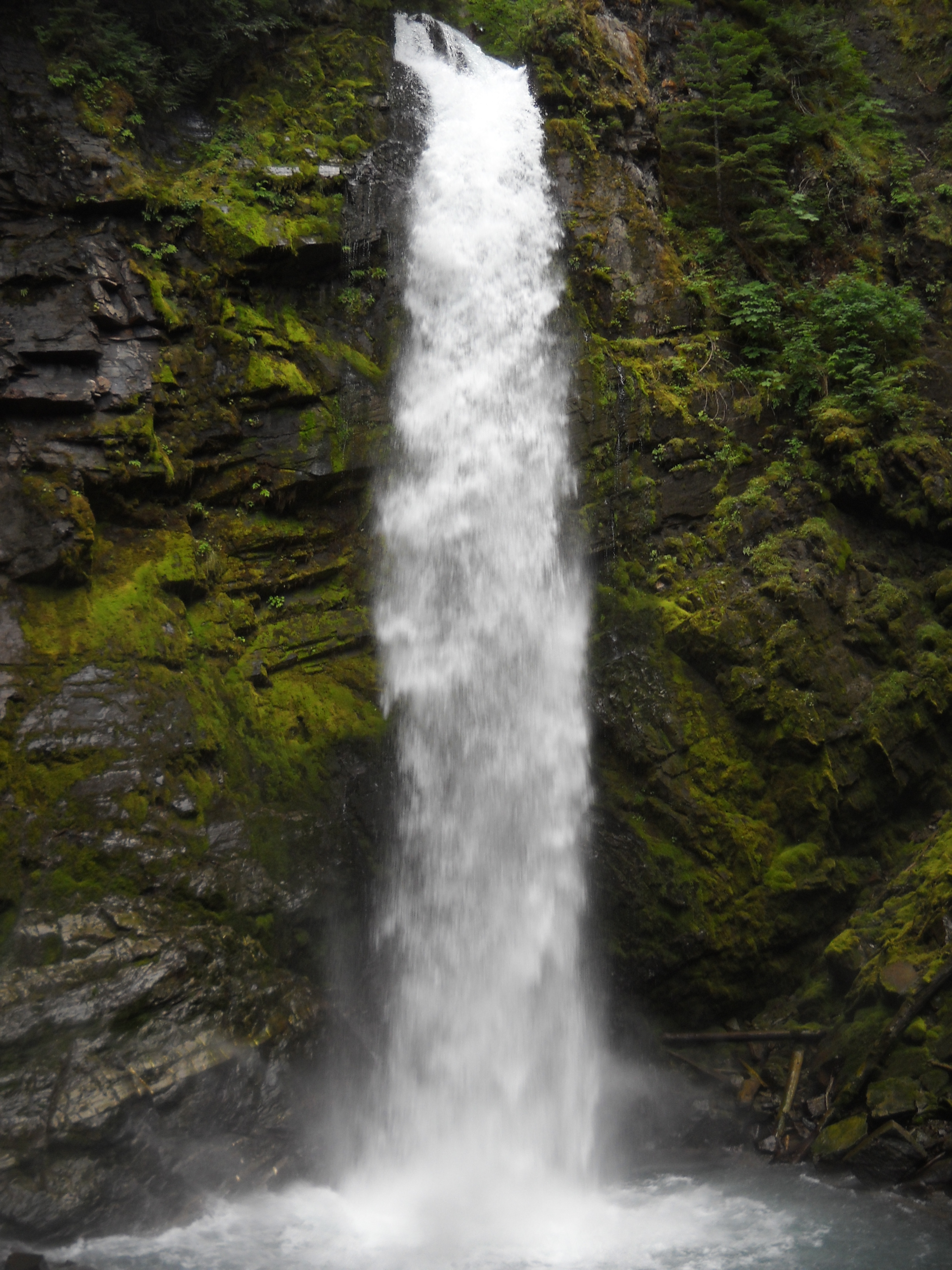
- Interactive map of Wells Creek Falls
- Location: Mount Baker Wilderness
- Coordinates: 48°51′54″N 121°45′51″W
- Type: Plunge
- Total height: 90 feet (27 m)
- Number of drops: 1
- Total width: 10 feet (3.0 m)
- Watercourse: Wells Creek
- Average flow rate: 250 cubic feet per second (7.1 m^{3}/s)

Wells Creek Falls is the generally used name for a waterfall on Wells Creek in the Mount Baker Wilderness in Washington. The falls are located several thousand feet above Wells Creek's confluence with Bar Creek.

== Characteristics ==
One of the better known falls on the slopes of Mount Baker, the falls are a single plunge of 90 feet (27 m) within a small gorge which the falls mark the beginning of. Several thousand feet downstream from the falls, the creek passes under Wells Creek Road & immediately is joined by Wells Creek's only major tributary, Bar Creek. A large culvert, rather than a bridge crosses the creek along Wells Creek Road.

The falls are occasionally confused with much larger Mazama Falls, which is two kilometers upstream. Ironically enough, Mazama Falls is officially named while Wells Creek Falls isn't despite the fact almost nobody has ever seen Mazama Falls up close & Wells Creek Falls is regularly visited by people driving up Wells Creek Road.

== Access ==
Although not quite as convenient & easy to reach as Nooksack Falls, the falls are not difficult to get to. They are located 5 kilometers up Wells Creek Road from Nooksack Falls & the condition of the road is quite good for a logging road, although it deteriorates beyond the falls. Once at the crossing, one can walk up the wide streambed to reach good views of the falls. Depending on how high the creek is, you may or may not have to get fairly wet, since at least one creek crossing is needed to get up close.

One can actually view the falls right from the crossing, however the view is partially obscured by trees.
