= Edwin Webster =

Edwin Webster may refer to:

- Edwin H. Webster (1829–1893), U.S. congressman from Maryland
- Edwin S. Webster (1867–1950), American electrical engineer and co-founder of Stone & Webster
