= Wells Creek =

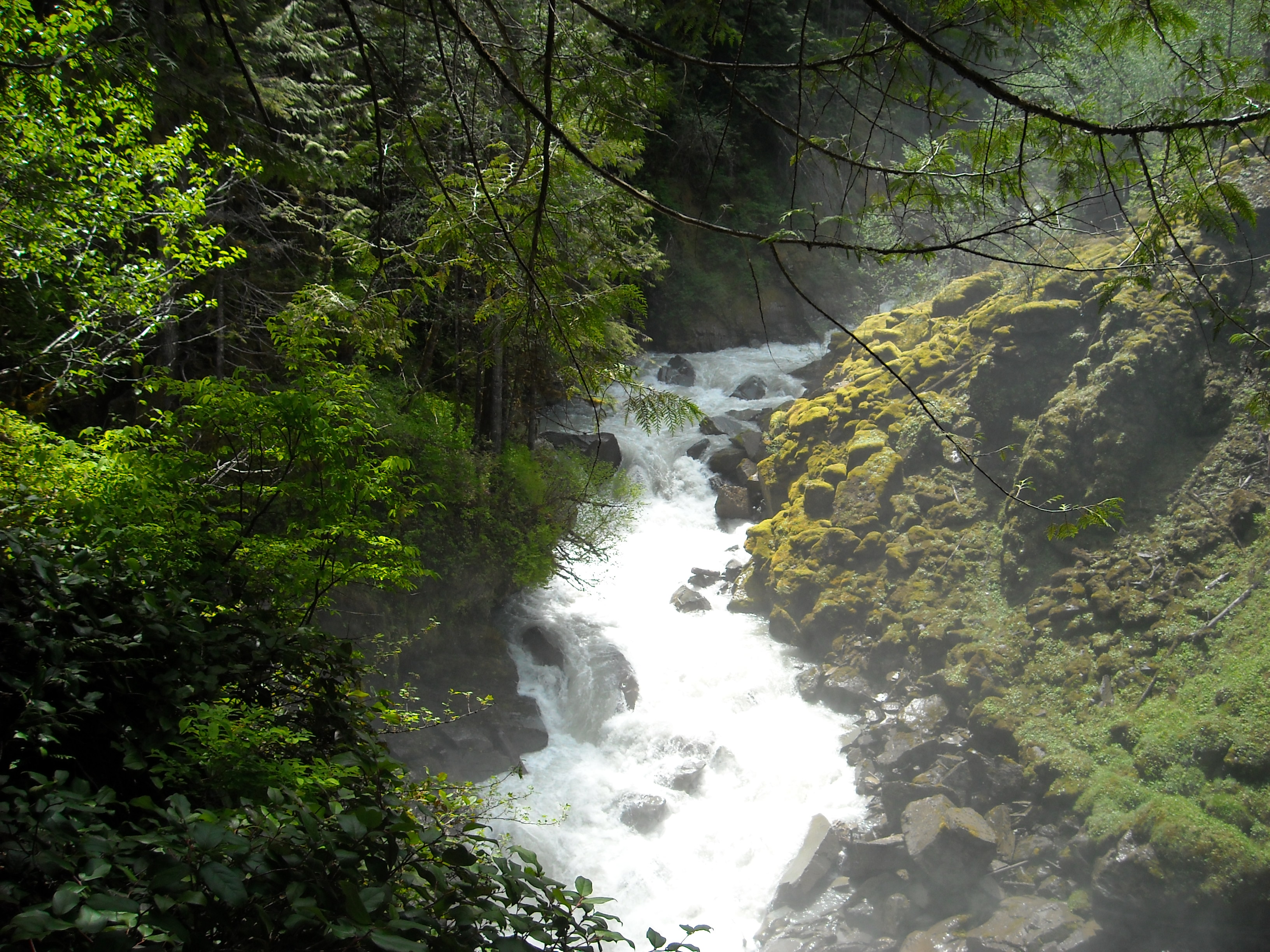

- Location of the mouth of Wells Creek in Washington Wells Creek (the United States)

Location
- Country: United States
- State: Washington
- Counties: Whatcom County

Physical characteristics
- Source: Between Ptarmigan and Lasiocarpa Ridge
  - location: North Cascades, Washington
  - coordinates: 48°49′25″N 121°44′37″W
- Mouth: Nooksack River
  - location: At the base of Nooksack Falls, Washington
  - coordinates: 48°54′18″N 121°48′32″W

Wells Creek is a swift creek in Whatcom County, Washington. It is a tributary of the Nooksack River, joining the river just below Nooksack Falls. It is best known for having six major waterfalls along its course. Wells Creek was named for Hamilton C. Wells who prospected the area in the 1880s and 1890s.

== Course ==
The creek begins between Ptarmigan Ridge and Lasiocarpa Ridge. It starts off by flowing northeast before soon turning northwest, being joined by the stream draining Mazama and Iceberg Lakes, and dropping over massive Mazama Falls. The creek continues to flow northwest and about 2 km after Mazama Falls, the creek drops over Wells Creek Falls. Soon after dropping over the falls, the creek flows under Wells Creek FSR, and is joined by its only officially named tributary, Bar Creek, which at the confluence is actually bigger than Wells Creek itself. The creek continues to flow northwest for 1.3 miles before it drops over Landslide Falls. From there on the creek continues to flow northwest, but within a deep gorge that sees it drop over two more major waterfalls. It is about 2 miles from Landslide Falls to its confluence at the base of Nooksack Falls.

== See also ==
- List of rivers in Washington
