= Ahmeek, Michigan =

- Village
- Village of Ahmeek
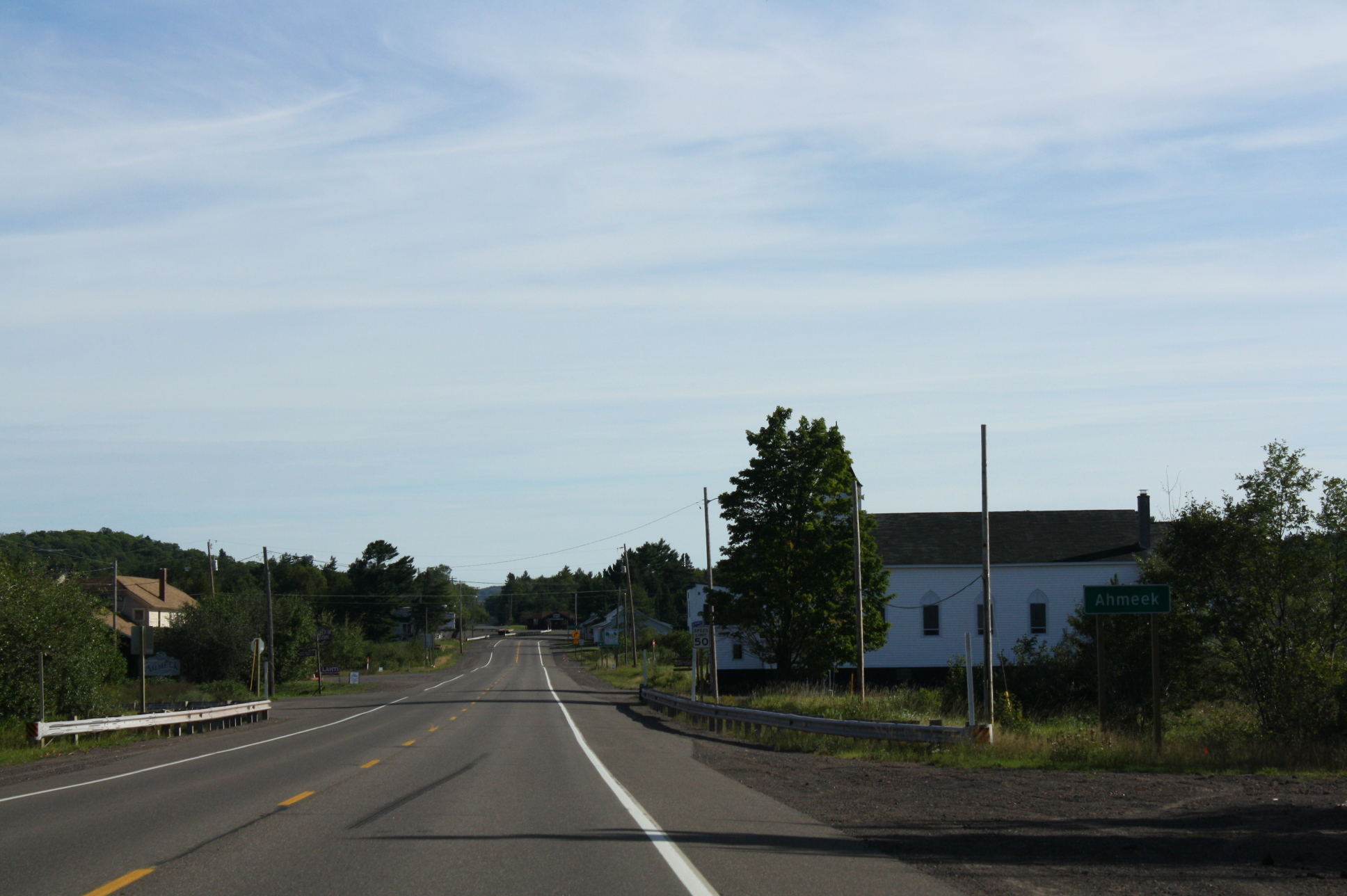
- Village of Ahmeek along U.S. Highway 41

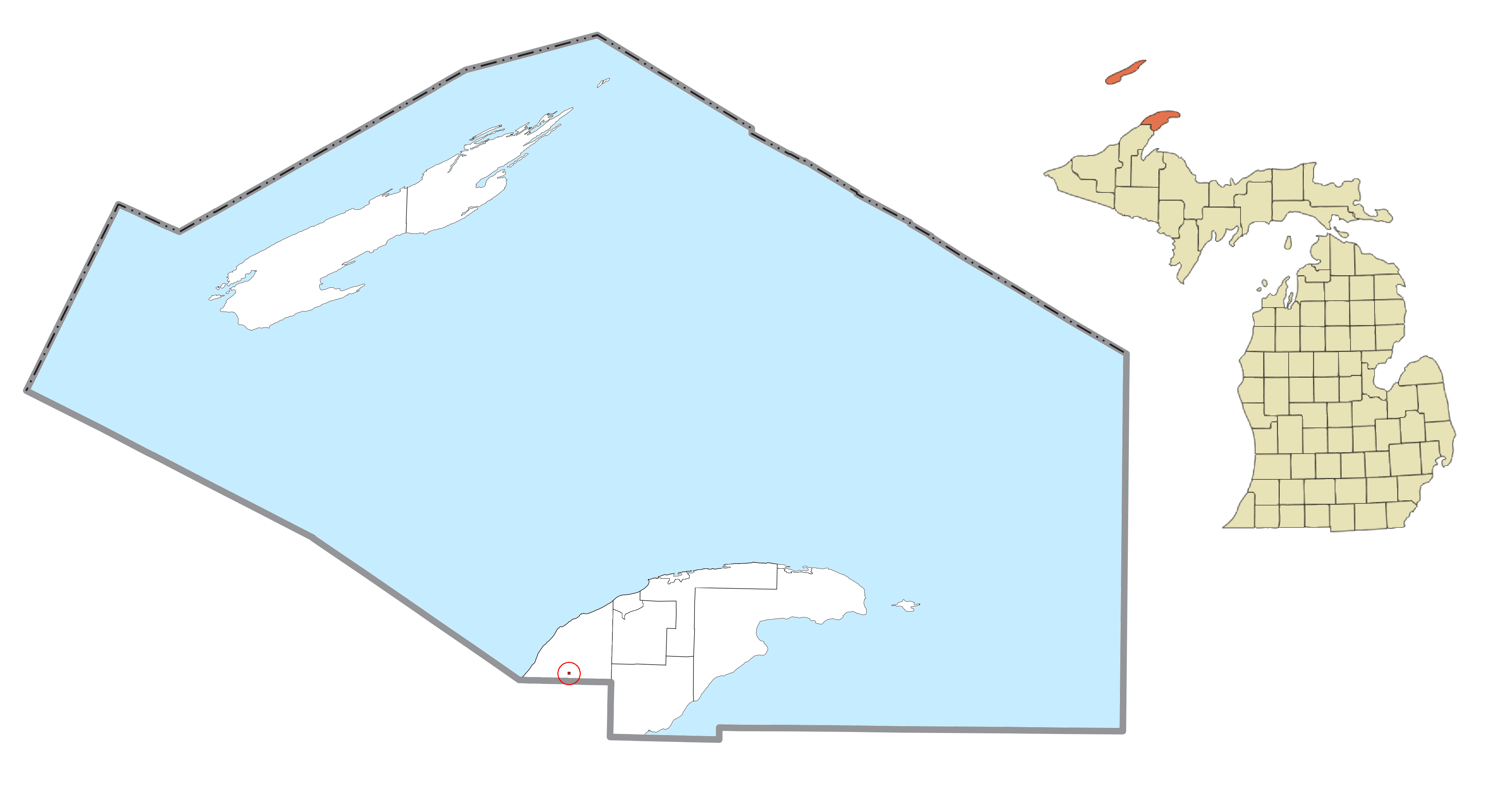
- Location within Keweenaw County

- Location within the state of Michigan Location within the United States
- Coordinates: 47°17′54″N 88°23′50″W
- Country: United States
- State: Michigan
- County: Keweenaw
- Township: Allouez
- Incorporated: 1909

Government
  - Type: Village council
  - President: Susan Gherna
  - Clerk: Amy Kumpula

Area
  - Total: 0.068 sq mi (0.176 km^{2})
  - Land: 0.068 sq mi (0.176 km^{2})
  - Water: 0 sq mi (0.00 km^{2})
- Elevation: 869 ft (265 m)

Population (2020)
  - Total: 127
- Time zone: UTC-5 (Eastern (EST))
  - Summer (DST): UTC-4 (EDT)
- ZIP code(s): 49901
- Area code: 906
- FIPS code: 26-00620
- GNIS feature ID: 2397918
- Website: Official website

Ahmeek (/ˈɑːmik/) is a village in Keweenaw County in the U.S. state of Michigan. The population was 127 at the 2020 census. At an area of 0.068 square miles (0.176 km^{2}), it is the smallest municipality in Michigan by land area. The village is located within Allouez Township and is the only incorporated municipality in Keweenaw County.

== History ==
The name Ahmeek is derived from the Ojibwe (Chippewa) language. The village takes its name from the Ojibwe word, amik, which means "Beaver", and it was named so because of an abundance of beavers in the vicinity of the present-day village.

The Ahmeek Mine was the most successful and productive mine along the Kearsarge Amygdaloid Lode, which extends through Houghton and Keweenaw Counties. Its No. 3 and No. 4 shafts were also among the most distinctive mining structures in Michigan's Copper Country.

=== Early days and founding ===
Mining itself in the community began around the year 1880 as the Ahmeek Mining Company began as an exploratory branch of the already-existing Seneca Mining Company to work the copper-rich Kearsarge Amygdaloid Lode. The Ahmeek Mining Company formally opened in 1903, thus becoming its own separate entity apart from the Seneca; however, operations of the Ahmeek Mine under the newly independent company initially began in the year 1902. The local area grew because of its location on the Mineral Range Railroad. In 1908, the construction of the Ahmeek Mining Company Office was completed, as designed by the architect Paul Macneil. The Village of Ahmeek was founded by Joseph Bosch, the creator of the Bosch Brewing Company, in 1904. Attorney James A. Hamilton became the first postmaster of Ahmeek on February 5, 1909, the same year in which it was incorporated as a village. The village was plotted by two real estate agents from Calumet by the names of Faucett and Gunk. The two agents divided the property into lots and then sold them piece by piece. As of the year of the village's incorporation, Maurice Kenel served as the first village President of Ahmeek, having been elected March 15, 1909. The village firehall was built several years later in 1911 at a total sum of $2,925. The local Calvary Cemetery, which is also known as the Ahmeek Cemetery, was created a year later in 1912.

=== Industrialization ===
Ahmeek served as a critical stop for several transportation services, mostly around the early 20th century. It served as a depot on the Mineral Range Railroad and the Copper Range Railroad and also had a streetcar station for the Houghton County Traction Company, which ran south from Houghton up to Ahmeek, and on north towards Mohawk. The Streetcar Station was completed in the year 1909 and operated under the Houghton County Traction Company until the year 1932, when it served other purposes, such as a bus stop.

=== Copper Country Strike of 1913–1914 ===
During the watershed moment that was the great Copper Country Strike of 1913–14, Ahmeek was the scene of regular tension and division in the Keweenaw, a key instance being on or about October 6, 1913, when Guy Wilkins, a clerk at the Ahmeek Mine supply office, was assaulted and shot after being confronted by a rogue mob. The strike was the culmination of extensive labour unrest in the area, fueled in large part by unethical treatment by mining companies. The strike brought the once-tranquil and calm Copper Country to violence, from which it would ultimately not recover. Ahmeek, in particular, saw striking miners fire upon a trainload of hired professional strikebreakers engaged by the mining companies, as well as the detonation of an Ahmeek Mine smokestack. Despite local officials' complaints about the lack of law and order, Judge Patrick Henry O'Brien, who presided over cases related to the violence, ruled that while the strikers were, indeed, in violation of the law, the mining companies themselves had hardly done anything to lessen the tension and had, instead, acted in ways only increasing "the bitterness and hostility" of the situation.

=== Later years ===
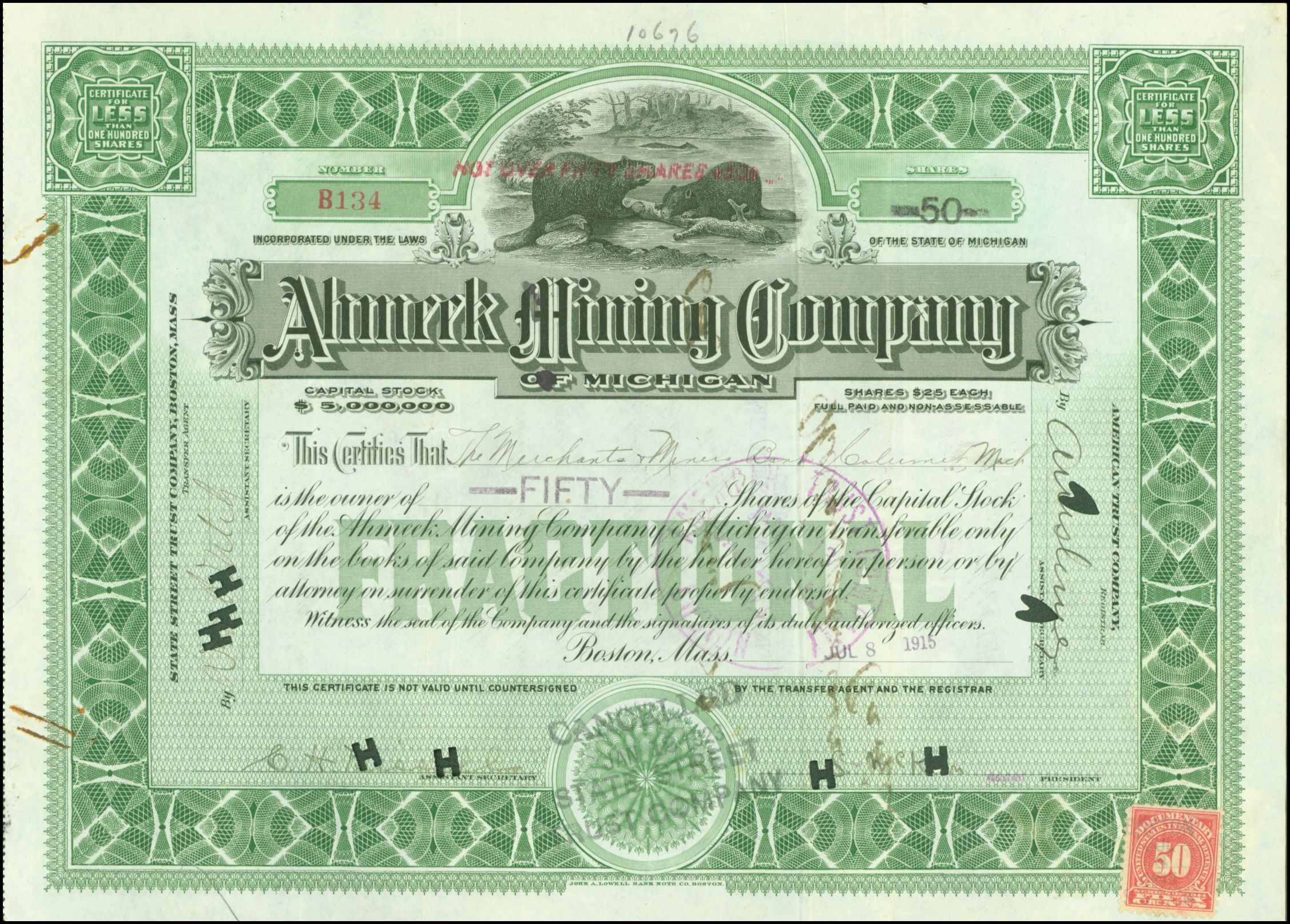
Share of the Ahmeek Mining Company, issued 8. July 1915

The Ahmeek Mining Company continued to work the Kearsarge lode through the Ahmeek Mine until the year 1923, when the mining company was incorporated into the Calumet and Hecla Mining Company. Operations of the site under the Calumet and Hecla Mining Company ceased in 1931 under effects of the Great Depression. After the Depression had concluded, the Ahmeek Mine reopened in the year 1936 and carried on until around 1966 when the mine closed permanently. On April 30, 1971, Gabriel J. Chopp, retired after thirty-nine years serving as Ahmeek's postmaster, thus making him the longest-serving postmaster of the village of Ahmeek, the only incorporated settlement in Keweenaw County.

== Geography ==
According to the U.S. Census Bureau, the village has a total area of 0.068 square miles (0.176 km^{2}), or 42.52 acres, all land.

=== Attractions ===
- The Gabriel J. Chopp Park, which is located within the village.
- The historic Houghton County Traction Company streetcar station in Ahmeek, a federally-recognised historic site where you can now spend the night.
- The Ahmeek Ice Rink and its adjacent playground on School Street.
- The Keweenaw Handicraft Shop, a regional home goods store.
- The ruins and leftover buildings of the Ahmeek Mine, including the Mine Office, the No. 2 Shaft of the Ahmeek Mine, as well as the Boiler house, dry house, Hoist house, and shaft of the Ahmeek Mine's No. 3 & 4 workings may be explored.
- The Lower Falls of the Gratiot River is an area tourist attraction about 3.5 miles southwest of Ahmeek.
- The Sand Hills Light, the last staffed lighthouse on the Great Lakes.

== Demographics ==
Historical population
Census	Pop.	Note	%±
1910	766		—
1920	892		16.4%
1930	624		−30.0%
1940	475		−23.9%
1950	360		−24.2%
1960	265		−26.4%
1970	238		−10.2%
1980	210		−11.8%
1990	148		−29.5%
2000	157		6.1%
2010	146		−7.0%
2020	127		−13.0%
U.S. Decennial Census

As of the census of 2000, there were 157 people, 82 households, and 36 families residing in the village. The population density was 2,237.9 inhabitants per square mile (864.1/km^{2}). There were 120 housing units at an average density of 1,710.5 per square mile (660.4/km^{2}). The racial makeup of the village was 96.82% White, 0.64% Asian, and 2.55% from two or more races. 29.1% were of Finnish, 19.6% Italian, 12.2% German, 12.2% English and 7.4% French ancestry. By 2010, there were 146 people, 73 households, and 38 families residing in the village. The population density was 2,085.7 inhabitants per square mile (805.3/km^{2}). There were 119 housing units at an average density of 1,700.0 per square mile (656.4/km^{2}). The racial makeup of the village was 99.3% White and 0.7% Native American. At the 2020 census, its population was 127.

In 2000, there were 82 households, out of which 18.3% had children under the age of 18 living with them, 34.1% were married couples living together, 3.7% had a female householder with no husband present, and 54.9% were non-families. 48.8% of all households were made up of individuals, and 23.2% had someone living alone who was 65 years of age or older. The average household size was 1.91 and the average family size was 2.84. In 2010, there were 73 households, of which 21.9% had children under the age of 18 living with them, 32.9% were married couples living together, 12.3% had a female householder with no husband present, 6.8% had a male householder with no wife present, and 47.9% were non-families. 38.4% of all households were made up of individuals, and 12.3% had someone living alone who was 65 years of age or older. The average household size was 2.00 and the average family size was 2.63.

In the village, the population was spread out, with 19.1% under the age of 18, 3.2% from 18 to 24, 31.2% from 25 to 44, 24.2% from 45 to 64, and 22.3% who were 65 years of age or older. The median age was 43 years. For every 100 females, there were 137.9 males. For every 100 females age 18 and over, there were 139.6 males.

In 2000, the median income for a household in the village was $24,231, and the median income for a family was $33,750. Males had a median income of $21,563 versus $21,250 for females. The per capita income for the village was $16,188. About 8.3% of families and 11.5% of the population were below the poverty line, including none of those under the age of eighteen and 5.9% of those sixty five or over. In 2010, the median age in the village was 45.7 years. 18.5% of residents were under the age of 18; 8.8% were between the ages of 18 and 24; 21.2% were from 25 to 44; 32.8% were from 45 to 64; and 18.5% were 65 years of age or older. The gender makeup of the village was 48.6% male and 51.4% female.

== Gallery ==
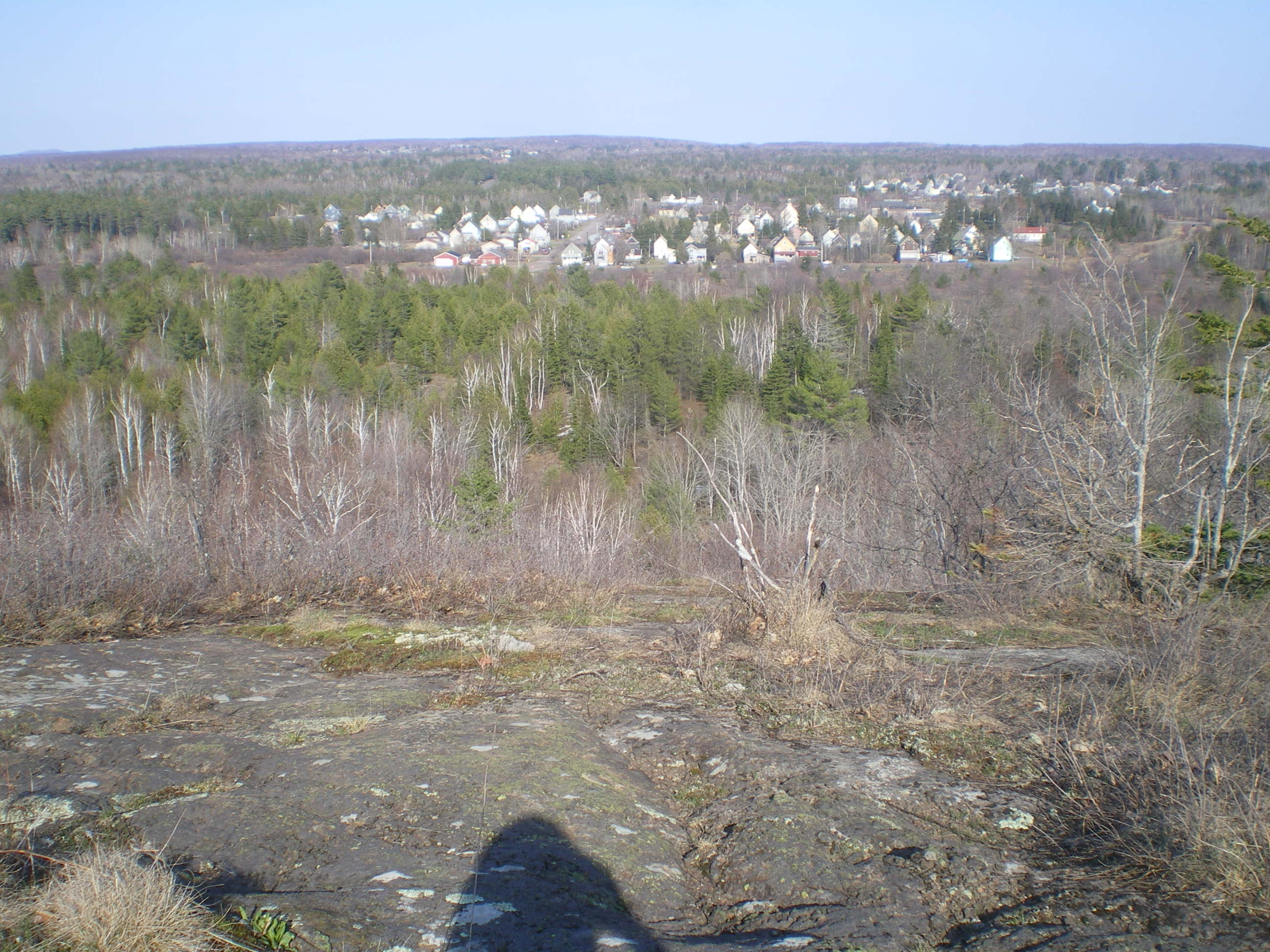
Hilltop view of Ahmeek

Hubbell Street in Ahmeek

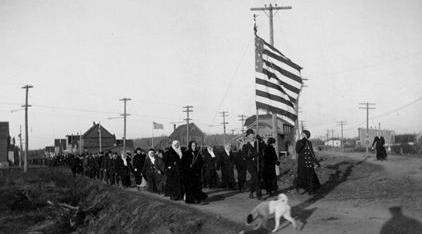
Copper Country strike of 1913–1914

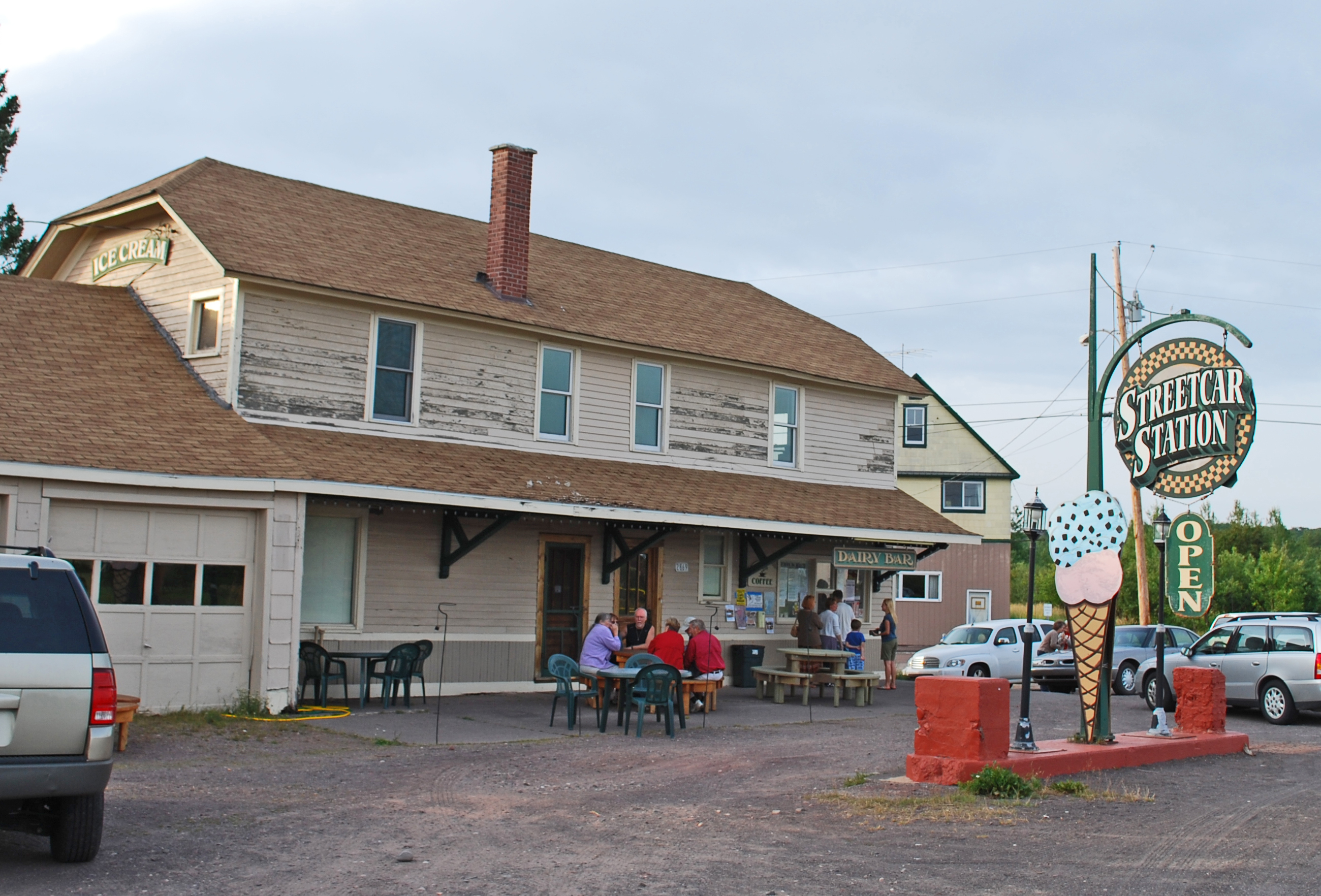
The historic Houghton County Traction Company Ahmeek Streetcar Station
