= Mazama Falls =

Waterfall in Washington (state), United States

- Interactive map of Mazama Falls
- Location: Whatcom County, Washington, United States
- Coordinates: 48°51′00″N 121°44′29″W
- Type: Tiered
- Elevation: 3,875 feet (1,181 m)
- Total height: 490 feet (150 m)
- Number of drops: 7
- Longest drop: 400 feet (120 m)
- Total width: 20 feet (6.1 m)
- Watercourse: Wells Creek
- Average flow rate: 250 cubic feet per second (7.1 m^{3}/s)

Mazama Falls, also referred to more simply as Wells Creek Falls (though this is incorrect, as there is a Wells Creek Falls downstream), is a waterfall on Wells Creek in the U.S. state of Washington. At nearly 500 feet (150 m) high, it is said to be the largest waterfall in the Wells Creek watershed.

The falls drops 500 feet (150 m) in three main tiers. The uppermost tier is formed as Wells Creek squeezes between a "pinched" cliff and falls over 200 feet (61 m) in a horsetail form, reminiscent of Nevada Falls in Yosemite National Park. Directly after this drop is a 100 feet (30 m) plunge, which falls into a water-sculpted bowl. The third tier is a short distance downstream, plunging about 150 feet (46 m) in a segmented form. The waterfall is also said to have four more smaller tiers, the largest of which is 50 feet (15 m).

The waterfall is easily seen from Wells Creek Road #33 in the Mount Baker Wilderness Area, approximately 7.5 miles (12.1 km) from Washington State Route 542. About 0.75 miles (1.21 km) below Mazama Falls is the 40 feet (12 m) rapids called Lower Mazama Falls. About 1.5 miles (2.4 km) downstream of Mazama Falls is Wells Creek Falls, a 90 feet (27 m) plunge.

== See also ==
- List of waterfalls
