= Stone & Webster =

American engineering and construction firm (1889–2000)

- Type: Subsidiary
- Industry: Engineering
- Founded: 1889 (Boston, Massachusetts)
- Founder: Charles Stone; Edwin Webster
- Headquarters: Stoughton, Massachusetts, U.S
- Number of employees: 3,500
- Parent: Westinghouse
- Website: www.stoneandwebster.com

Stone & Webster was an American engineering services company based in Stoughton, Massachusetts. It was founded as an electrical testing lab and consulting firm by electrical engineers Charles A. Stone and Edwin S. Webster in 1889. In the early 20th century, Stone & Webster was known for operating streetcar and major interurban trolley systems in many cities across the United States including Dallas, Houston and Seattle, and designed its own interurban cars of high quality. The company grew to provide engineering, construction, environmental, and plant operation and maintenance services, and it has long been involved in power generation projects, starting with hydroelectric plants of the late 19th-century; and with most American nuclear power plants.

Stone & Webster failed and became a division of The Shaw Group in 2000. In 2012, the French engineering conglomerate Technip acquired Stone & Webster's energy and chemical business, and process technologies and associated oil and gas engineering capabilities from The Shaw Group. The CB&I acquisition of other assets of The Shaw Group, also in 2012, resulted in the formation of a nuclear power subsidiary, CB&I Stone Webster, which operated for about 4 years, being sold in January 2016 to Westinghouse Electric Company.

== History ==
=== Founding through 1930s ===
Stone & Webster logo c. 1922

Charles A. Stone and Edwin S. Webster met in 1884 and became close friends while studying electrical engineering at the Massachusetts Institute of Technology. In 1890, two years after graduating, they formed the Massachusetts Electrical Engineering Company, which in 1893 was renamed Stone & Webster. It was one of the earliest electrical engineering consulting firms in the United States.

Stone & Webster's first major project was the construction of a hydroelectric plant for the New England paper company in 1890. Following the panic of 1893, Stone & Webster acquired the Nashville Electric Light and Power Co. for a few thousand dollars, subsequently reselling it for $500,000.

Throughout the next ten years, Stone & Webster acquired interest in large number of utilities while offering managerial, engineering and financial consulting to a number of independent utility firms. Even though Stone & Webster were not a holding company, their financial and managerial presence meant that they had considerable influence in policy decisions. They would often be paid in utility stock.

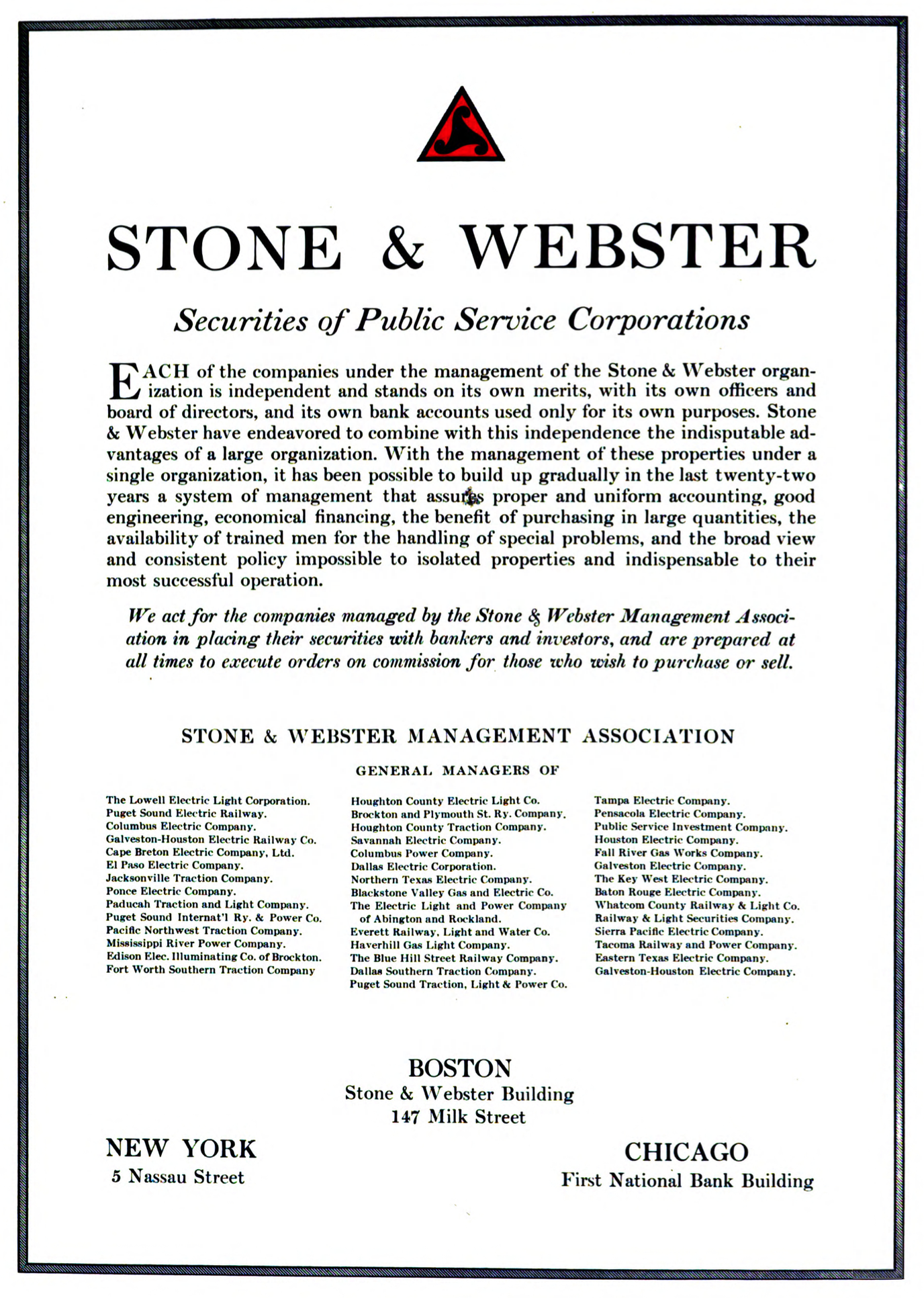
Advertisement in McGraw electric railway manual for Stone and Webster Securities of Public Services Corporations

As of 1912, Stone and Webster served as general managers of the following utilities:

- The Lowell Electric Light Corporation
- Puget Sound Electric Railway
- Columbus Electric Company
- Galveston-Houston Electric Railway Co.
- Cape Breton Electric Company, Ltd.
- El Paso Electric Company
- Jacksonville Traction Company
- Ponce Electric Company
- Paducah Traction and Light Company
- Puget Sound International Ry. & Power Co.
- Pacific Northwest Traction Company
- Mississippi River Power Company
- Edison Elec. Illuminating Co. of Brockton
- Fort Worth Southern Traction Company
- Houghton County Electric Light Co
- Brockton and Plymouth St. Ry. Company
- Houghton County Traction Company
- Savannah Electric Company
- Columbus Power Company
- Dallas Electric Corporation
- Northern Texas Electric Company
- Blackstone Valley Gas and Electric Co.
- The Electric Light and Power Company of Abington and Rockland
- Everett Railway, Light and Water Co.
- Haverhill Gas Light Company
- The Blue Hill Street Railway Company
- Dallas Southern Traction Company
- Puget Sound Traction, Light & Power Co
- Tampa Electric Company
- Pensacola Electric Company
- Public Service Investment Company
- Houston Electric Company
- Fall River Gas Works Company
- Galveston Electric Company
- The Key West Electric Company
- Baton Rouge Electric Company
- Whatcom County Railway & Light Co.
- Railway & Light Securities Company
- Sierra Pacific Electric Company
- Tacoma Railway and Power Company
- Eastern Texas Electric Company
- Galveston-Houston Electric Company

Stone & Webster became involved in Washington State engineering projects—Washington's natural resources, and hydroelectric power, and resulting development opportunities brought companies like Stone & Webster to the state—beginning with Puget Sound area street railways. By 1900, they had controlled and merged eight small rail lines in Seattle; soon after, they also took over the street railway systems of Tacoma and Everett. By 1908, Stone & Webster listed thirty-one railway and lighting companies under its management including five located in Washington State: the Puget Sound Electric Railway, Puget Sound International Railway and Power Co., Puget Sound Power Co., The Seattle Electric Co., and Whatcom County Railway and Light Co.

Stone & Webster leadership was sensitive to the concerns of large utility holding companies and were careful to emphasize the complete independence of these utilities, but Edwin Webster believed that outside capital was crucial to develop the resources of Washington, and chided those who thought otherwise. In 1905, Stone & Webster bought out the power and lighting properties that were once owned by the Bellingham Bay Improvement Co., including the York Street Steam plant and the partially built Nooksack Falls Hydroelectric Power Plant.Stone & Webster took over construction operations and on September 21, 1906, Bellingham received power from the plant via a 47-mile-long (76 km) transmission line. Despite the independence allowed its subsidiaries, J.D. Ross, superintendent of Seattle City Light issued a report critical of Stone & Webster's presence in Seattle, listing 49 companies under Stone & Webster's management at the time.

By 1912, the company, nationally, had divided itself into three specialized subsidiaries:

- Stone & Webster Engineering
- Stone & Webster Management Association
- Stone & Webster Investments

In 1927, Stone & Webster expanded the investments business, merging its securities subsidiaries with the investment banking firm of Blodget & Co. founded in 1886, to form Stone & Webster and Blodget, Inc.

=== 1940s activities, including in nuclear power ===
Stone & Webster was selected as the overall contractor for building the plants producing the necessary fissionable material for the Manhattan Project. The company was selected in June 1942 by the first head of the Manhattan Engineering District, James C. Marshall.

In January, 1946, the name of the business, was changed to Stone and Webster Securities Corporation. Stone and Webster Securities was one of the 17 U.S. investment banking and securities firms named in the United States Department of Justice's antitrust investigation of Wall Street commonly known as the Investment Bankers Case. The Stone & Webster investment banking operations were eventually acquired by Kidder Peabody which already had overlapping ownership.

=== Challenges in the 1970s–80s ===
The investment banking affiliate, Stone & Webster Securities, had attempted to grow by acquiring two smaller, regional brokerage houses in 1968: Hayden, Miller & Co., based in Cleveland, and Atlanta-based Wyatt, Neal & Waggoner. That increased the number of offices of the firm from nine to 28, but cultural and style differences between the parent company's traditional engineering management and retail brokerage management led to an exodus of key employees, and the Securities firm closed its doors in 1974.

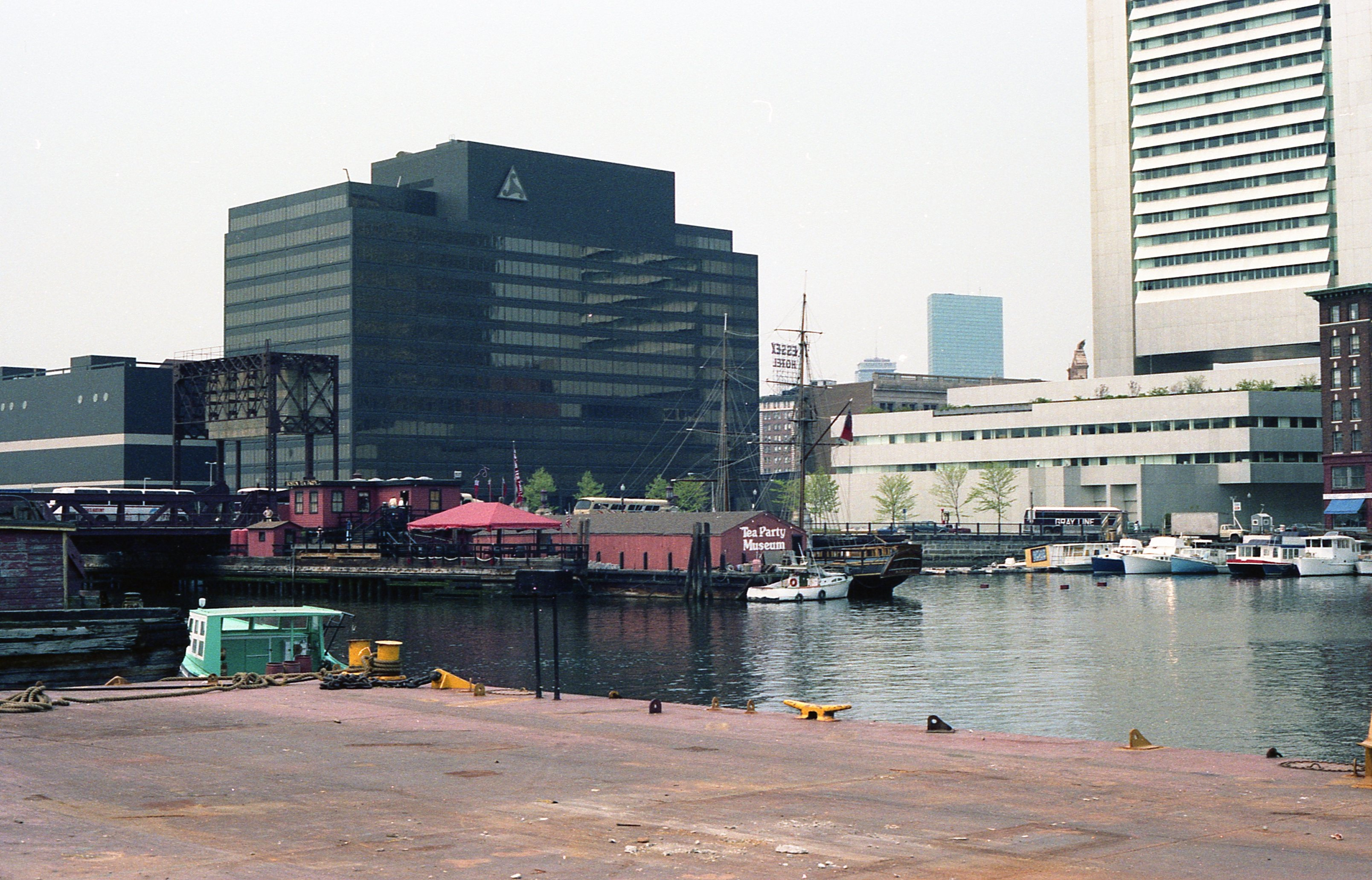
Stone & Webster headquarters at 245 Summer St. in Boston in 1980. It was constructed in 1975 after unused portions of South Station were demolished.

=== 2000s ===
The company collapsed in 2000 after a major bribery scandal. It had attempted to pay $147 million to a relative of Indonesian President Suharto to secure the largest contract in Stone & Webster's history. But the plan went bad, and the company fell along with it.

Subsequently, Stone & Webster filed for Chapter 11 bankruptcy protection in 2000 because of cash flow problems. It was bought at auction by the Shaw Group for US$150 million.

The Shaw Energy and Chemicals division integrated Stone & Webster branded technology. Shaw's E&C division attempted to compete with other more successful engineering contractors such as Bechtel, Foster Wheeler, Jacobs and Technip. Since the Shaw buyout, the Power group performed record business in engineering and construction of coal-fired power plants and power plant environmental control retrofits including FGD and SCR technology. Shaw's alliance with Westinghouse led to substantial Stone & Webster technology and engineering applications in the nuclear power industry. In 2008, ENR ranked the Stone & Webster subsidiary of The Shaw Group subsidiary as first in revenue for Power EPC, and fifth by Revenue in Process & Petrochemical EPC.

In 2012, Technip, a French engineering conglomerate, agreed to purchase most of the Energy and Chemical Division of Shaw Group

The remainder of The Shaw Group assets were ultimately purchased by Chicago Bridge & Iron Company, for about US$3 billion, completing the acquisition in February 2013. A subsidiary that was formed as a result, CB&I Stone Webster—a result of Shaw Groups earlier acquisition of Stone & Webster during its bankruptcy—was again sold, in January 2016, to Westinghouse Electric Co., for US$ 229M.

== See also ==
- Birney Safety Car A standard streetcar designed by Stone & Webster engineer Charles O. Birney
- Northern Texas Traction Company A subsidiary company

== Archives and records ==
- Stone & Webster records at Baker Library Special Collections, Harvard Business School.
