= Nooksack Falls Hydroelectric Power Plant =

- U.S. National Register of Historic Places
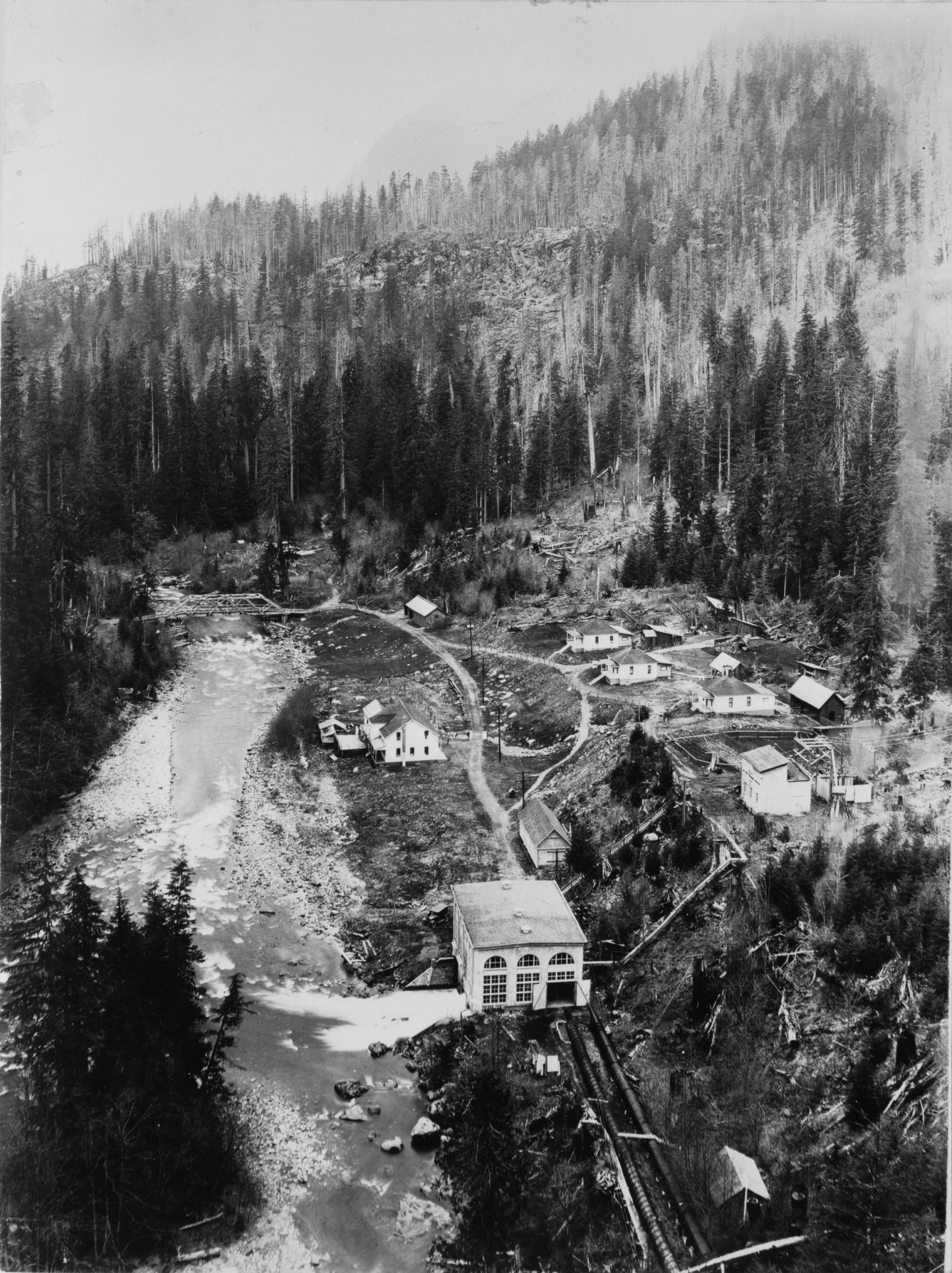
- Nooksack Falls Hydroelectric Power Plant (1906)
- Location: Route 542 on Nooksack River, Whatcom County, Washington
- Nearest city: Glacier, Washington
- Coordinates: 48°54′32″N 121°48′53″W
- Built: 1906
- NRHP reference No.: 88002735
- Added to NRHP: December 15, 1988

The 1500-kilowatt capacity Nooksack Falls Hydroelectric Power Plant was constructed at Nooksack Falls on the Nooksack River in 1906 by Stone & Webster, which is the second oldest operating facility in western Washington. The plant operated for over 90 years and ceased operation in 1997 due to a fire which destroyed the generator.

== Bellingham Bay Improvement Company ==
In 1889, an association of investors led by Pierre B. Cornwall formed the Bellingham Bay Improvement Company (BBIC). The company was mostly made up of wealthy California businessmen who were investing heavily into Bellingham with the vision that it would one day become an important urban center for commerce and trade. The BBIC invested in several diverse enterprises such as shipping, coal, mining, railroad construction, real estate sales and utilities. Even though their dreams of turning Bellingham into a Pacific Northwest metropolis never came to fruition, the BBIC made an immense contribution to the economic development of Bellingham. The BBIC had the franchise for providing electricity to the city of Bellingham, which at that time primarily went to street lighting and electric streetcars. However, by 1903 the small generator powering Bellingham was proving to be inadequate for the growing city. The BBIC began developing a hydroelectric plant on the North Fork of the Nooksack River, below Nooksack Falls.

In 1904, the BBIC's electrical franchise with the city of Bellingham was up for renewal and the city council made it abundantly clear that they were not happy with BBIC's performance up to this point. The city event threatened to build a municipally owned hydroelectric plant at Whatcom Falls. After a survey showing that BBIC was supplying Bellingham with cheaper power than any of the municipal proposals, the city subsequently backed off.

In addition to the hostility felt by the city council, the BBIC was also encountering construction problems at Nooksack Falls. In 1903 the BBIC had bored six tunnels, yet the generator and transformers for the plant were waiting fifty miles away. Moving heavy hydroelectric equipment through the mountains to the Nooksack site proved to be a challenge. The heaviest equipment ended up being shipped to the railhead at Glacier, loaded on a sled and pulled through the mountains. The first piece of heavy equipment to be brought in was a crane with a forty thousand pound capacity. Lighter equipment and parts were brought in by pack animals. Many local residents were paid to lease out their animals. However, all the difficulties of maintaining a generator and trying to construct the Nooksack Site took its toll on BBIC. In 1905 the board of directors announced the sale of its utility holdings.

== Stone & Webster ==
In 1905, Stone & Webster bought out the power and lighting properties that were once owned by the BBIC. These included the York Street Steam plant and the partially built Nooksack Falls Hydroelectric Power Plant. Stone & Webster took over construction operations and on September 21, 1906, Bellingham received power from the plant via a 47-mile-long (76 km) transmission line.

For much of the plant's history, it served as the center of a small community. Because of its remote location, rugged landscape, and primitive transportation, the only practical way to operate the plant was to have employees on site. The utility company employed one chief-operator and two assistant operators, housed in three frame cottages. In addition, a school teacher was hired to tutor children. A two-story wood frame hotel was built around 1905 to house company officials, construction workers and other visitors. A section of the hotel was used as a classroom. Employment for the plant reached its peak between 1906 and the mid-1920s. Once the plant became automated by 1978, the cottages were demolished in order to discourage squatters from living there.

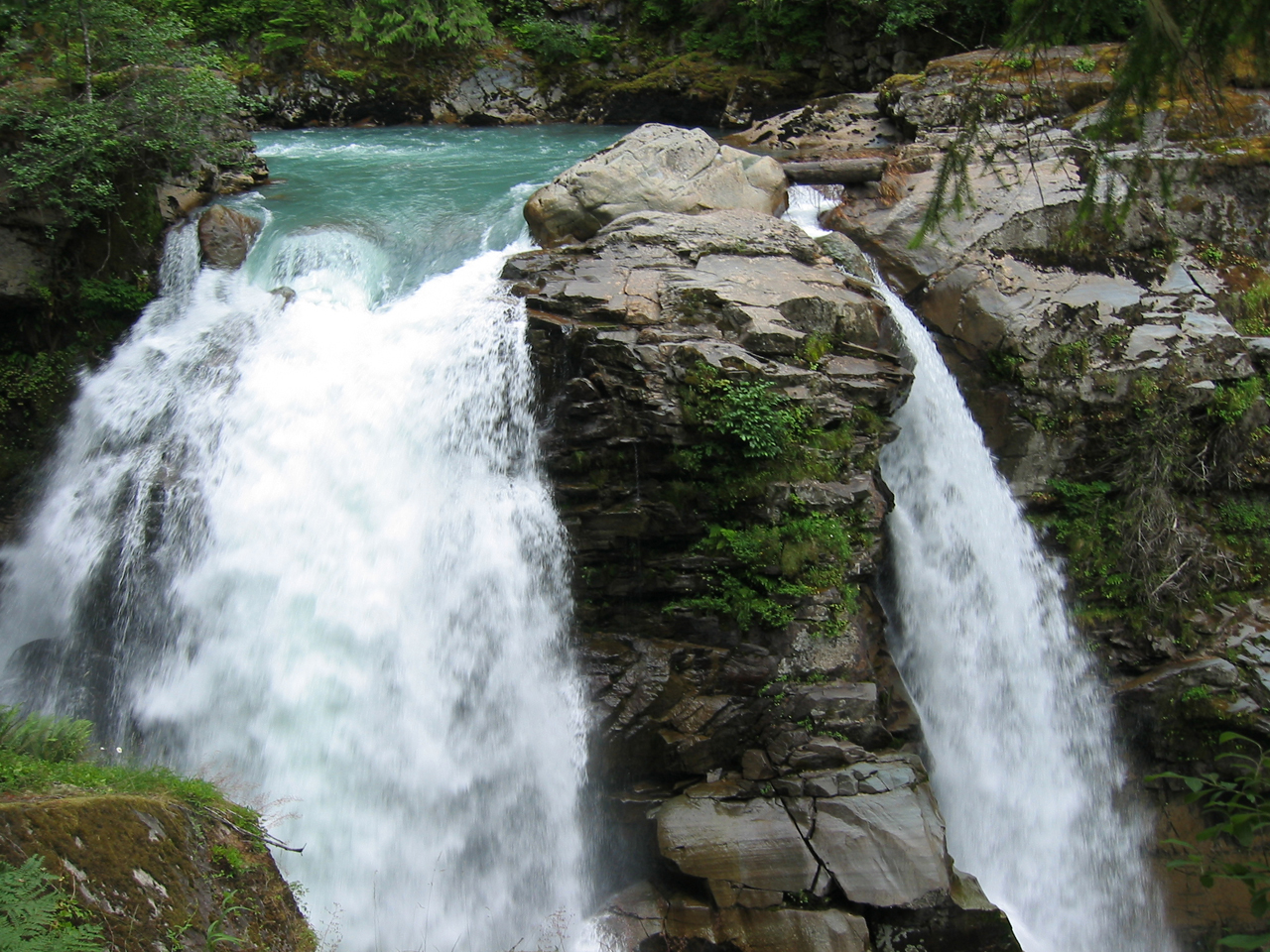
A close up of Nooksack Falls from the Lower Viewpoint

The Power Plant was placed on The National Register of Historic Places on December 15, 1988.
