= Houghton County Traction Company Ahmeek Streetcar Station =

- U.S. National Register of Historic Places
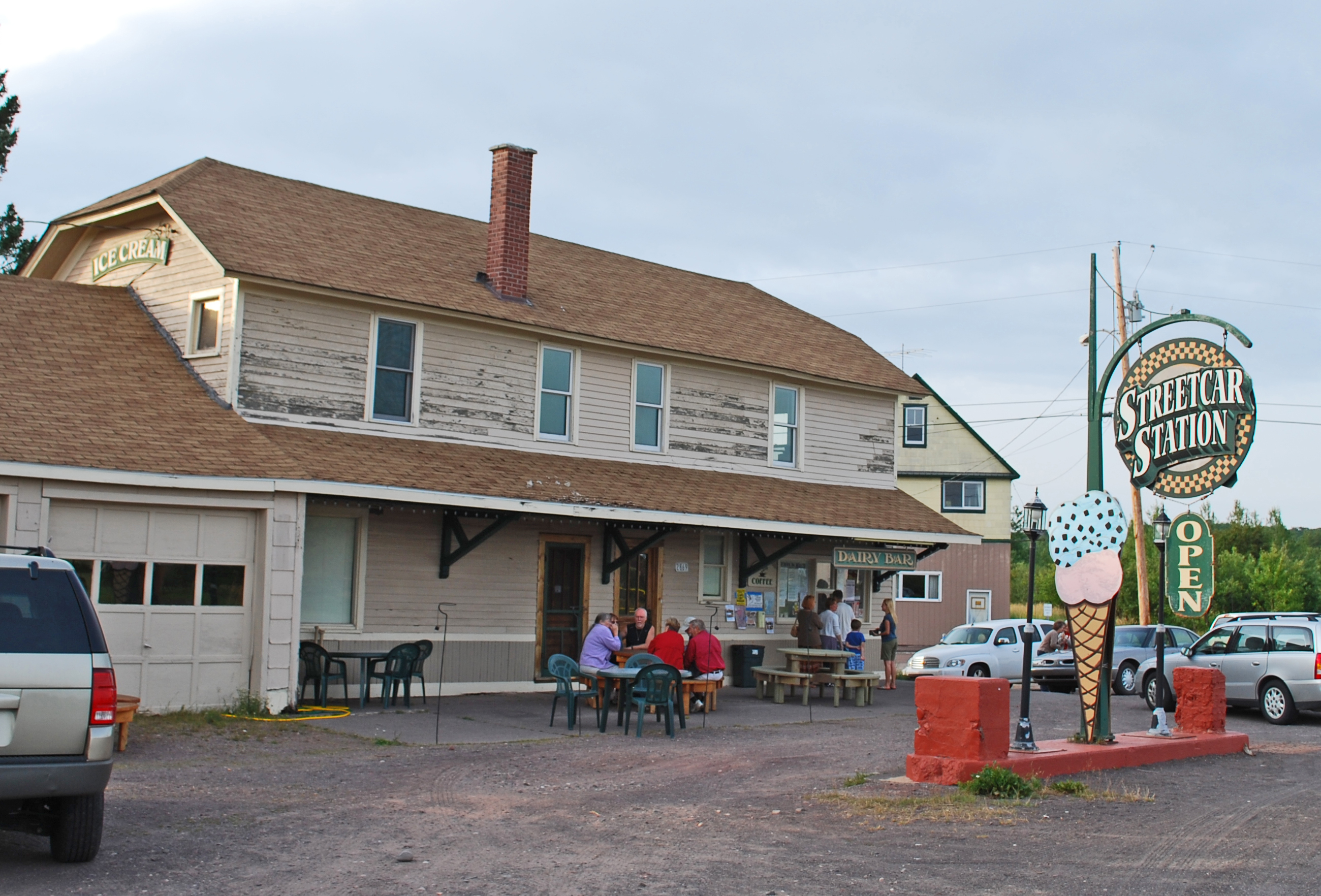

- Location within Michigan Location within the United States
- Interactive map
- Location: US 41/M-26 and Hubbell St., Ahmeek, Michigan
- Coordinates: 47°17′48″N 88°23′42″W
- Built: 1909
- Architectural style: Bungalow/Craftsman
- NRHP reference No.: 00000221
- Added to NRHP: March 15, 2000

The Houghton County Traction Company Ahmeek Streetcar Station is a rail station located at the corner of US 41/M-26 and Hubbell Street in Ahmeek, Michigan. It was listed on the National Register of Historic Places in 2000.

== Houghton County Traction Company ==
The Houghton County Traction Company was started in 1900 as an interurban line in the Keweenaw Peninsula. The first section of track ran from Hancock to nearby Boston; in 1901, the line was extended to Calumet. During the next few years, a spur was built running to Lake Linden and Hubbell, and in 1908 the line was extended to just north of Mohawk.

The Houghton County Traction Company remained in business until 1932, in the depths of the Great Depression.

== Station History ==
The Ahmeek Station is one of the original trolley stops of the Houghton County Traction Company, which served Ahmeek and the surrounding location. The original stop in Ahmeek was a simple shelter. However, in 1909 the Allouez Mining Company leased land to the Houghton County Traction Company to construct a sub-station and waiting at this location. A building was constructed that year, but almost immediately outgrew its space. In 1910, the Traction Company constructed a small addition, which has since been removed. In 1931, Highway 41 was widened by the Michigan Department of Transportation, and the entire building was moved approximately 40 feet west to the other side of the railroad tracks.

After the rail line folded, the station was used for various purposes including a bus stop, gas station, restaurant, residence, vacation rental, and antique shop. Currently the building houses a seasonal ice cream window (since the 1950s), a vacation rental upstairs (the completely renovated and updated old station managers residence, since 2011), an ADA-friendly luxury vacation rental in the South Room (the old repurposed and renovated former garage, since 2023), and Keweenaw Island Gifts (new in 2025). The entire building runs 100% off solar power from March to November. There are two Level 2 Electric Vehicle chargers available with honor-system payment. The grounds under and around the solar array are landscaped with native midwest wildflowers.

== Description ==
The Houghton County Traction Company Ahmeek Streetcar Station is a rectangular wood-framed two-story building with a gabled roof and clapboard siding. A single story wing is now the South Room vacation rental. The front of the building has a pair of doors in the center and large windows are at each end of the first floor. Above are four half awning windows. One of the first floor windows has a walk-up sliding window with a shed roof overhang. The rear of the building was originally the site of the train platform.

Inside, the first floor contains an ice cream shop on the north end, the large waiting room now serving as a gift shop in the middle, and the South Room vacation rental on the south end. The gift shop is finished with headboard below a chair rail and has a tongue and groove headboard ceiling. The upstairs area was originally the stationmaster's apartment, and contains a kitchen, living room, two bedrooms, and a bathroom.
