= Charles A. Stone =

American electrical engineer, businessman (1867–1941)

Charles Stone
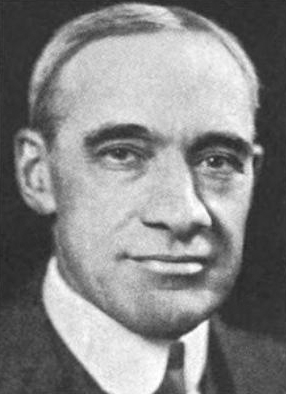
- Born: Charles Augustus Stone; January 16, 1867; Newton, Massachusetts, U.S.
- Died: February 25, 1941 (aged 74); New York City, U.S.
- Resting place: Locust Valley Cemetery, Locust Valley, New York, U.S.
- Education: Massachusetts Institute of Technology (1888)
- Occupations: Electrical engineer, businessman
- Years active: 1890–1941
- Board member of: Stone & Webster; Federal Reserve Bank of New York (1919–1923); Freeport Texas Company; Stone & Webster and Blodgett Inc.; International Mercantile Marine Co.; International Acceptance Bank, Inc.; Bank of the Manhattan Company; First National Bank of Boston; Research Corporation; Union Pacific Railroad
- Spouse: Mary Adams Leonard (died 1940)
- Children: 4

Charles Augustus Stone (1867–1941) was an early American electrical engineer and graduate from the Massachusetts Institute of Technology. He co-founded Stone & Webster with his friend Edwin S. Webster, and was chairman of the company for many years.

== Career ==
Stone & Webster built their business from a base at Stoughton, Massachusetts into a multi-faceted engineering services company that provided engineering, construction, environmental, and plant operation and maintenance services. They became involved with power generation projects, starting with hydroelectric plants of the late 19th-century that led to building and operating electric streetcar systems in a number of cities across the United States.

As well as industrial plants, they built the 50-storey General Electric building in New York City, the Cathedral of Learning at the University of Pittsburgh, a landmark now listed in the National Register of Historic Places, as well as buildings for Massachusetts Institute of Technology.

Stone & Webster was the prime contractor for the electromagnetic separation plant for the Manhattan Project at Oak Ridge, Tennessee.
