= Edwin S. Webster =

American electrical engineer (1867-1950)

Edwin Webster
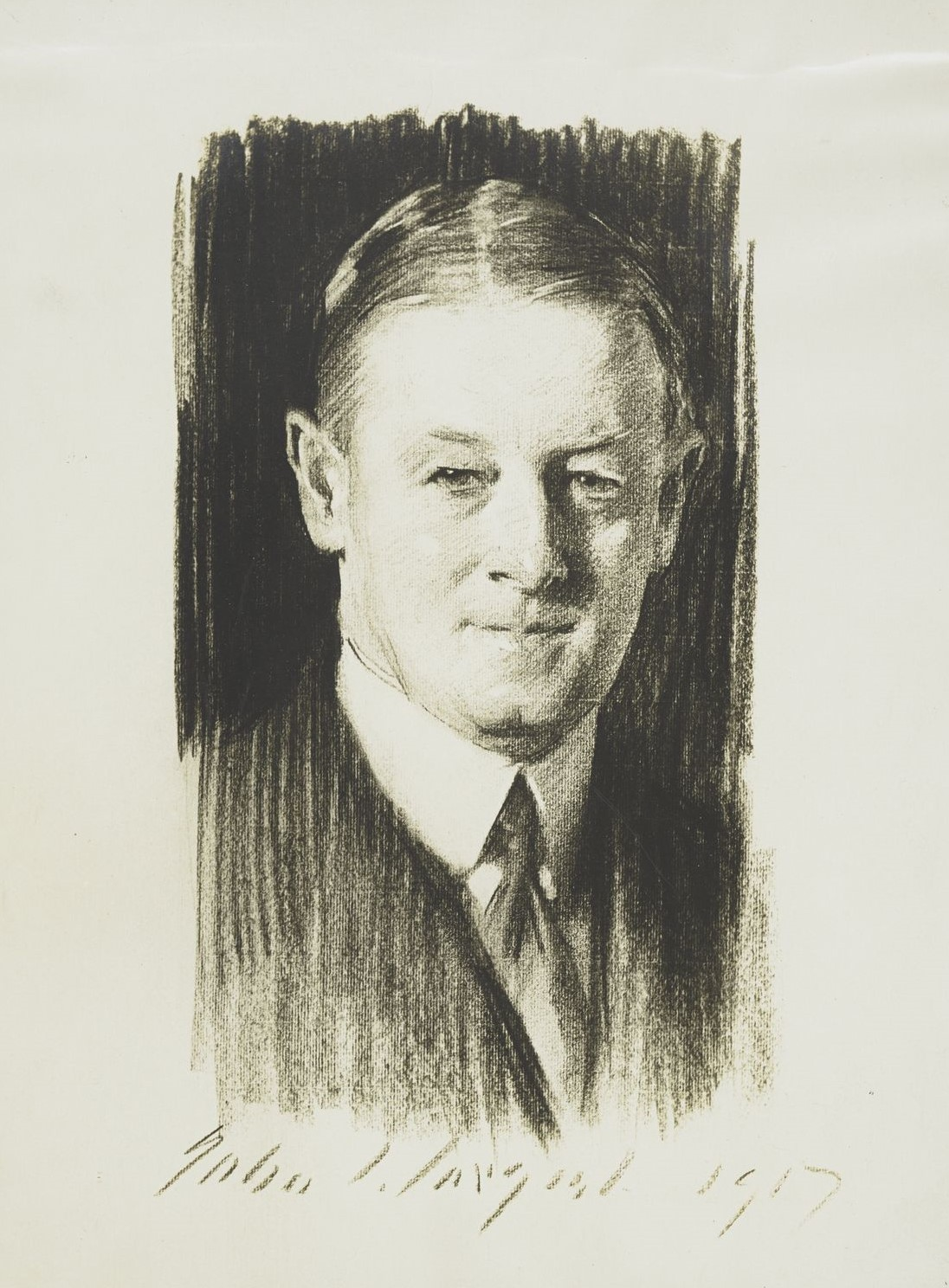
- Portrait of Webster by John Singer Sargent
- Born: August 26, 1867; Roxbury, Massachusetts, US
- Died: May 10, 1950 (aged 82); Chestnut Hill, Massachusetts, US
- Resting place: Mount Auburn Cemetery, Cambridge, Massachusetts
- Education: Massachusetts Institute of Technology (1888)
- Occupations: Electrical engineer, businessman
- Years active: 1890-1941
- Board member of: Stone & Webster, Consolidated Investment Trust, United Fruit Company, Pacific Mills, Wilmington & Franklin Coal Company, Tampa Electric Company, Ames Shovel & Tool Company
- Spouse: Jane Depeyster Hovey
- Children: 3

Edwin Sibley Webster (August 26, 1867 – May 10, 1950) was an American electrical engineer and graduate from the Massachusetts Institute of Technology. He co-founded Stone & Webster with his friend Charles A. Stone. He was president and vice-chairman of the company for many years, becoming chairman on the death of his partner in 1941.

Stone & Webster built their business from a base at Stoughton, Massachusetts into a multi-faceted engineering services company that provided engineering, construction, environmental, and plant operation and maintenance services. They became involved with power generation projects, starting with hydroelectric plants of the late 19th-century that led to building and operating electric streetcar systems in a number of cities across the United States.

As well as industrial plants, they built the 50-storey General Electric Building in New York City, the Cathedral of Learning at the University of Pittsburgh, a landmark now listed in the National Register of Historic Places, as well as buildings for Massachusetts Institute of Technology. Stone & Webster was the prime contractor for the electromagnetic separation plant for the Manhattan Project at Oak Ridge, Tennessee.

As a governor appointed chairman of the Commission on Administration and Expenditures, in January 1922, he submitted the commission's Report on State Administration and Expenditures.
