= Nooksack Falls =

Waterfall in Washington (state), United States

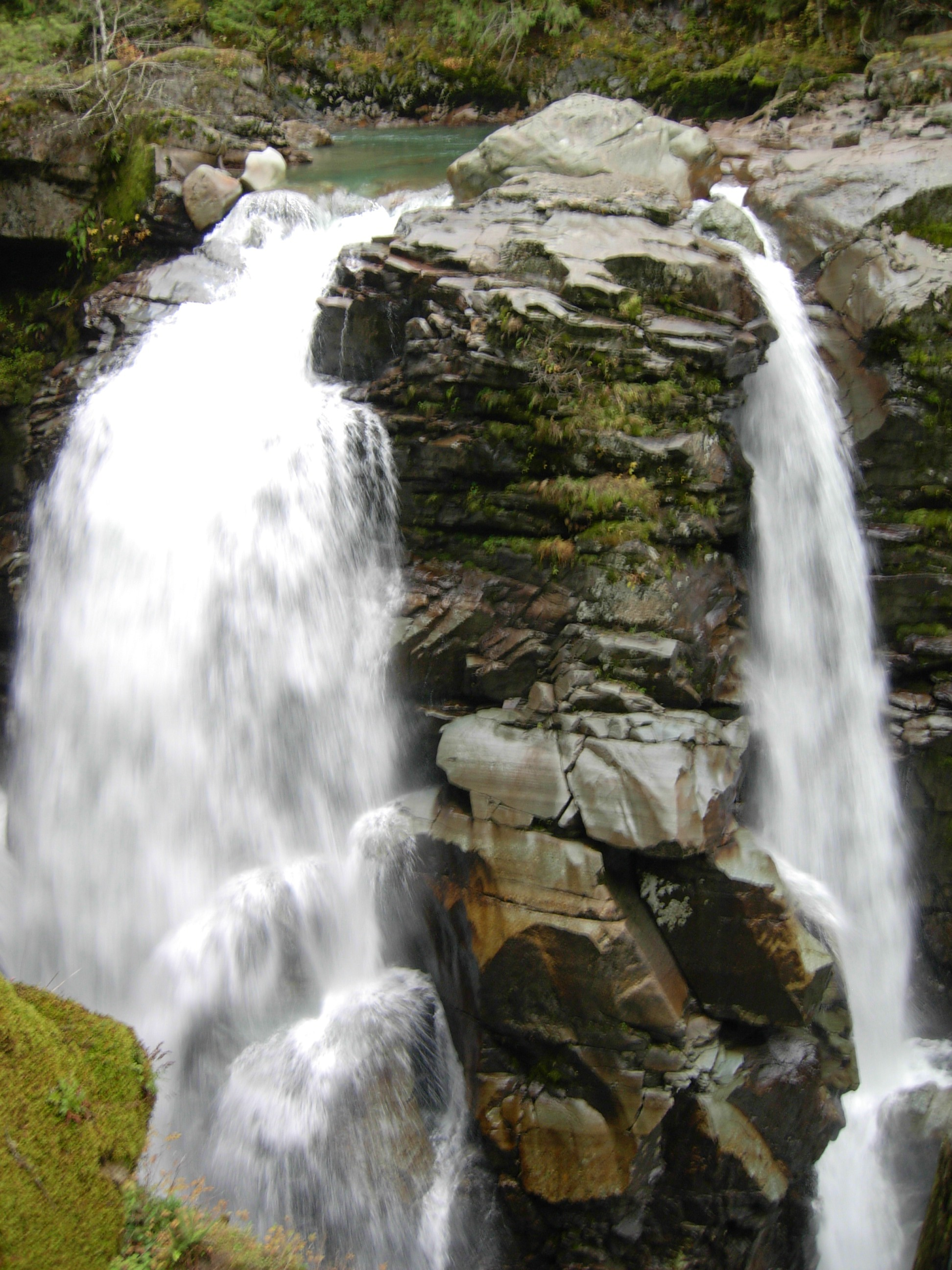
- Interactive map of Nooksack Falls
- Location: Mount Baker National Forest, Whatcom County, Washington, United States
- Coordinates: 48°54′19″N 121°48′32″W
- Type: Segmented
- Total height: 88 feet (27 m)
- Number of drops: 1
- Longest drop: 88 feet (27 m)
- Total width: 30 feet (9.1 m)
- Watercourse: North Fork Nooksack River

Nooksack Falls is a waterfall along the North Fork of the Nooksack River in Whatcom County, Washington. The water flows through a narrow valley and drops freely 88 feet into a deep rocky river canyon. The falls are viewable from the forested cover near the cliffs edge. The falls are a short 2/3 of a mile drive off the Mount Baker Highway (State Route 542). The falls were featured in the hunting scene of the movie The Deer Hunter.

== History ==
Throughout the late 19th century, significant mineral discoveries were made in eastern Whatcom County and in particular the Nooksack Falls region. The richest and most significant strike was the Lone Jack Claim of 1897. Before the mine closed in 1924, approximately $500,000 worth of gold was excavated. Due to the success of the Lone Jack Claim, the area became known as the Mount Baker Mining District and produced over 5,000 claims between 1890 and 1937. One of the claims, known as the Great Excelsior Mine, was located ten miles (16 km) southwest of the Lone Jack Mine and only one mile (1.6 km) from the Nooksack Falls Powerplant. In 1902, the Excelsior Claim erected a 20-stamp mill to crush the ore and a water powered turbine provided the power. In 1914, when the Excelsior Mill was rebuilt, a power line was extended from the Nooksack Falls plant to provide electricity to the mill.
